= List of bank mergers in the United States =

This is a partial list of major banking company mergers in the United States.

== Table ==
Year merger closed	Acquirer	Acquired bank	Merged entity	Transaction value	Transaction adjusted	Ultimate successor
1900	North American Trust Company	International Banking and Trust Company	North American Trust Company			JPMorgan Chase
1901	Berks County Trust Company	Schuylkill Valley Bank	Berks County Trust Company			Wells Fargo
1903	First National Bank of Boston	Massachusetts Bank	First National Bank of Boston (later Bank of Boston)			Bank of America
1905	Trust Company of America	City Trust, North American Trust Company	Trust Company of America			JPMorgan Chase
1909	Consolidated National Bank	Oriental Bank	National Reserve Bank			JPMorgan Chase
1911	Chatham National Bank	Phenix National Bank	Chatham and Phenix National Bank			JPMorgan Chase
1912	Wilmington Trust	National Bank of Wilmington and Brandywine	Wilmington Trust			M&T Bank
1912	Wilmington Trust	First National Bank	Wilmington Trust			M&T Bank
1914	Mutual Alliance Trust Company	National Reserve Bank	Mutual Alliance Trust Company			JPMorgan Chase
1915	Chatham and Phenix National Bank	Mutual Alliance Trust Company	Chatham and Phenix National Bank			JPMorgan Chase
1923	Bank of North America	Commercial Trust Company	Bank of North America and Trust Company			Wells Fargo
1926	Fidelity Trust Company	Philadelphia Trust Company	Fidelity-Philadelphia Trust Company			Wells Fargo
1929	Security Trust Company	National Bank of Delaware	Security Trust Company			PNC Financial Services
1929	Colonial Trust Company	Northeastern Trust Company	Colonial-Northeastern Trust Company			Wells Fargo
1929	Pennsylvania Company for Insurances on Lives and Granting Annuities	Bank of North America and Trust Company	The Pennsylvania Company for Insurances on Lives and Granting Annuities Later: The Pennsylvania Company for Banking and Trust,			Wells Fargo
1930	Chase National Bank	Equitable Trust Company of NY	Chase National Bank			JPMorgan Chase
1930	Chase National Bank	Interstate Trust Company	Chase National Bank			JPMorgan Chase
1931	Straus National Bank and Trust Company	Continental Bank and Trust Company	Continental Bank and Trust Company			JPMorgan Chase
1932	Manufacturers Trust Company	Chatham Phenix National Bank and Trust Company of New York	Manufacturers Trust Company			JPMorgan Chase
1932	Berks County Trust Company	Colonial-Northeastern Trust Company	Berks County Trust Company (1964 as American Bank and Trust Co or American Bankcorp)			Wells Fargo
1941	Berks County Trust Company	Union National Bank (Pennsylvania)	Berks County Trust Company (1964 as American Bank and Trust Co or American Bankcorp)			Wells Fargo
1943	Wilmington Trust	Union National Bank	Wilmington Trust			M&T Bank
1948	Chemical Bank & Trust Company	Continental Bank and Trust Company	Chemical Bank & Trust Company			JPMorgan Chase
1951	Chemical Bank & Trust Company	National Safety Bank & Trust Company of NY	Chemical Bank & Trust Company			JPMorgan Chase
1952	Equitable Trust Company	Security Trust Company	Equitable Security Trust Company			PNC Financial Services
1952	County Trust Company of White Plains, N.Y.	Mount Vernon Trust Company	County Trust Company			BNY
1954	Chemical Bank & Trust Company	Corn Exchange Bank & Trust Company	Chemical Corn Exchange Bank			JPMorgan Chase
1955	Pennsylvania Company for Banking and Trust	First National Bank	First Pennsylvania Banking and Trust Company			Wells Fargo
1955	National City Bank of New York	First National Bank of New York	First National City Bank			Citigroup
1955	The Manhattan Company	Chase National Bank	Chase Manhattan Bank			JPMorgan Chase
1955	Bankers Trust	Public National Bank & Trust Co.	Bankers Trust			Deutsche Bank
1956	Citizens and Southern National Bank of South Carolina	Growers Bank and Trust	Citizens and Southern National Bank of South Carolina			Bank of America
1956	Fidelity-Philadelphia Trust Company	Farmers National Bank of Bucks County	Fidelity-Philadelphia Trust Company			Wells Fargo
1956	Fidelity-Philadelphia Trust Company	Roosevelt Bank	Fidelity-Philadelphia Trust Company			Wells Fargo
1957	Commercial National Bank	American Trust Co.	American Commercial Bank			Bank of America
1957	Chase Manhattan Bank	Staten Island National Bank & Trust Co. of NY	Chase Manhattan Bank			JPMorgan Chase
1959	Chase Manhattan Bank	Clinton Trust Company	Chase Manhattan Bank			JPMorgan Chase
1959	Chemical Corn Exchange Bank	New York Trust Company	Chemical Bank New York Trust Company			JPMorgan Chase
1961	J. P. Morgan & Co.	Guaranty Trust Co. of NY	Morgan Guaranty Trust Co. of NY			JPMorgan Chase
1960	American Commercial Bank	Security National Bank	North Carolina National Bank			Bank of America
1961	Manufacturers Trust Company	Hanover Bank	Manufacturers Hanover Corporation			JPMorgan Chase
1963	Chemical Bank New York Trust Company	Bank of Rockville Centre Trust Company	Chemical Bank New York Trust Company			JPMorgan Chase
1940s-1960s	Berks County Trust Company	Wyomissing Valley Bank, Temple State Bank, Mount Penn Trust Company, Reamstown Exchange Bank, Schuylkill Trust Company	Berks County Trust Company (1964 as American Bank and Trust Co or American Bankcorp)			Wells Fargo
1964	National Bank of Commerce	Texas National Bank	Texas National Bank of Commerce Houston (Later, Texas Commerce Bank)			JPMorgan Chase
1964	Chemical Bank New York Trust Company	First National Bank of Mount Vernon	Chemical Bank New York Trust Company			JPMorgan Chase
1964	Chemical Bank New York Trust Company	Bensonhurst National Bank of Brooklyn	Chemical Bank New York Trust Company			JPMorgan Chase
1964	County Trust Company of White Plains, N.Y.	Peoples Bank of Rockland County	County Trust Company of White Plains, N.Y.			BNY
1975	Chemical Bank	Security National Bank	Chemical Bank			JPMorgan Chase
1975	Bank of New York	County Trust Company of White Plans, New York	Bank of New York			BNY
1981	First American Bank Corporation	Northern States Bancorporation	First American Bank Corporation	$30 million	$106.2 million	PNC Financial Services
1983	Mellon National Corporation	Girard Bank	Mellon National Corporation			BNY
1983	BankAmerica	Seafirst Bank	BankAmerica (Seafirst banks operated as Seafirst until 1998)			Bank of America
1983	American Bankcorp (changed name from Berks County Trust Company to American Bank and Trust Co. 1964)	Central-Penn National Corporation (Central-Penn Bank)	Meridian Bancorp, Incorporated			Wells Fargo
1984	Chase Manhattan Bank	Lincoln First Bank	Chase Manhattan Bank (Chase Lincoln First until 1993)			JPMorgan Chase
1984	NBD Bancorp	Pontiac State Bank	NBD Bancorp	$65 million	$201.4 million	JPMorgan Chase
1985	Bank of Boston	Colonial Bank	Bank of Boston			Bank of America
1985	Bank of Boston	Rhode Island Hospital Trust National Bank	Bank of Boston			Bank of America
1985	Bank of New England Corp.	The Connecticut Bank and Trust Co.	Bank of New England Corp.			Bank of America
1985	Citizens and Southern Georgia Corporation	Citizens and Southern National Bank of South Carolina	Citizens & Southern National Bank			Bank of America
1985	Trust Company of Georgia	SunBank	SunTrust			Truist
1985	Signet Banking Corporation	Union Trust Bancorp	Signet Banking Corporation			Wells Fargo
1986	Signet Banking Corporation	Security National Corp.	Signet Banking Corporation			Wells Fargo
1986	Sovran Financial Corporation	Suburban Bank	Sovran Financial Corporation			Bank of America
1985	SunTrust	Third National Corporation	SunTrust			Truist
1986	NBD Bancorp	Peoples Bank of Port Huron	NBD Bancorp	$22 million	$64.6 million	JPMorgan Chase
1986	NBD Bancorp	Midwest Commerce Corporation	NBD Bancorp	$61 million	$179.2 million	JPMorgan Chase
1986	NBD Bancorp	Union Bancorp	NBD Bancorp	$120 million	$352.5 million	JPMorgan Chase
1986	NBD Bancorp	Omnibank Corporation	NBD Bancorp	$85 million	$249.7 million	JPMorgan Chase
1986	Security Pacific Bank	The Arizona Bank	Security Pacific Bank			Bank of America
1986	Wells Fargo	Crocker National Bank	Wells Fargo (combined California bank uses Crocker's charter)			Wells Fargo
1987	Chemical Bank	Texas Commerce Bank	Chemical Bank (TX banks continued to operate as Texas Commerce)	$1.2 billion	$3.4 billion	JPMorgan Chase
1987	NBD Bancorp	USAmeribancs	NBD Bancorp	$250 million	$708.5 million	JPMorgan Chase
1987	Fleet Financial Group	Norstar Bank	Fleet/Norstar Financial Group	$1.3 billion	$3.7 billion	Bank of America
1987	First Fidelity Bank	The Fidelity Bank (Fidelcor)	First Fidelity Bank	$1.34 billion; largest ever at the time	$3.8 billion	Wells Fargo
1987	PNC Financial Corporation	Central Bancorp.	PNC Financial Corporation	Nearly $700 million	Nearly $2 billion	PNC Financial Services
1987	RepublicBank Corp.	Interfirst Corp.	First Republic Bank Corporation			Bank of America
1987	Security Pacific Bank	Rainier Bancorp	Security Pacific Bank (banks in Pacific NW continued to operate as Rainier)	$1.15 billion	$3.3 billion	Bank of America
1987	Sovran Financial Corporation	Commerce Union Bank	Sovran Financial Corporation			Bank of America
1987	NBD Bancorp	State National Corporation	NBD Bancorp	$103 million	$291.9 million	JPMorgan Chase
1987	U.S. Bancorp of Oregon	Peoples National Bank of Washington	U.S. Bancorp of Oregon			U.S. Bancorp
1987	First Union	Atlantic National Bank of Florida	First Union			Wells Fargo
1988	Bank of New York	Irving Trust Company	Bank of New York			BNY
1988	Shawmut Bank	Hartford National Corp.	Shawmut Bank			Bank of America
1988	Shawmut Bank	Arlington Trust Co.	Shawmut Bank			Bank of America
1988	NBD Bancorp	Charter Bank Group	NBD Bancorp	$65 million	$176.9 million	JPMorgan Chase
1988	First Bank System	Central Bank of Denver	First Bank System (Colo. banks never became First Bank due to name conflict)			U.S. Bancorp
1988	Wells Fargo	Barclays Bank of California, a subsidiary of Barclays	Wells Fargo			Wells Fargo
1988	Security Pacific Bank	The Hibernia Bank	Security Pacific Bank			Bank of America
1988	Credit Suisse	The First Boston Corporation	Credit Suisse First Boston			UBS
1988	North Carolina National Bank	First Republic Bank Corporation	North Carolina National Bank			Bank of America
1989	PNC Financial Corporation	Bank of Delaware Corporation	PNC Financial Corporation			PNC Financial Services
1989	Boatmen's Bancshares	Centerre Bank	Boatmen's Bancshares			Bank of America
1989	Security Pacific Bank	Nevada National Bancorporation	Security Pacific Bank			Bank of America
1989	Union Planters Bank	Magna Bank (Missouri)	Union Planters Bank			Regions Financial Corporation
1990	CoreStates Financial Corporation	First Pennsylvania Banking and Trust Company (Direct successor of the Bank of North America, the first bank in the United States)	CoreStates Financial Corporation			Wells Fargo
1990	First Union	Florida National Bank	First Union			Wells Fargo
1990	Citizens & Southern National Bank	Sovran Financial Corporation	C&S/Sovran Corporation	$4.7 billion	$11.6 billion	Bank of America
1991	Fleet/Norstar Financial Group	Bank of New England	Fleet/Norstar Financial Group			Bank of America
1991	NBD Bancorp	FNW Bancorp	NBD Bancorp	$205 million	$484.6 million	JPMorgan Chase
1991	NBD Bancorp	Gainer Corp	NBD Bancorp	$134 million	$316.7 million	JPMorgan Chase
1991	North Carolina National Bank	C&S/Sovran Corporation	NationsBank	$4.3 billion	$10.2 billion	Bank of America
1991	Norwest Corporation	United Bank of Denver	Norwest Corporation			Wells Fargo
1991	Wachovia	The South Carolina National Bank	Wachovia			Wells Fargo
1991	First Union	Southeast Banking Corporation	First Union			Wells Fargo
1991	NBD Bancorp	Summcorp	NBD Bancorp	$323 million	$763.5 million	JPMorgan Chase
1991	Society National Bank	Ameritrust Corporation	Society National Bank			KeyBank
1991	Signet Banking Corporation	Madison National Bank	Signet Banking Corporation			Wells Fargo
1991	First Fidelity Bank	Atlantic Financial	First Fidelity Bank	$991 million	$2.3 billion	Wells Fargo
1992	BankAmerica	Security Pacific Bank	BankAmerica	$5 billion	$11.5 billion	Bank of America
1992	KeyBank	Puget Sound National Bank	KeyBank			KeyBank
1992	Barnett Bank	First Florida Bank	Barnett Bank			Bank of America
1992	Comerica	Manufacturers Bank	Comerica			Fifth Third Bank
1992	NBD Bancorp	INB Financial Corp.	NBD Bancorp	$876 million	$2 billion	JPMorgan Chase
1992	Chemical Bank	Manufacturers Hanover Corporation	Chemical Bank	$1.9 billion	$4.4 billion	JPMorgan Chase
1992	First Fidelity Bank	Howard Savings Bank	First Fidelity Bank			Wells Fargo
1993	First Bank System	Colorado National Bank	First Bank System (CNB remained unchanged until after merger with U.S. Bancorp)			U.S. Bancorp
1993	Banc One Corporation	Valley National Bank of Arizona	Banc One Corporation			JPMorgan Chase
1993	Bank of Boston	South Shore Bank, Mechanics Bank, First Agricultural	Bank of Boston			Bank of America
1993	First Union	Dominion Bank	First Union			Wells Fargo
1993	First Union	First American Bankcorp	First Union			Wells Fargo
1993	NationsBank	Maryland National Bank	NationsBank			Bank of America
1993	NationsBank	American Security Bank	NationsBank			Bank of America
1994	Society National Bank	KeyBank	KeyBank	$7.8 billion	$16.9 billion	KeyBank
1994	Harris Bank	Suburban Bancorp	Harris Bank	$246 million	$534.4 million	BMO Bank
1994	Signet Banking Corporation	Pioneer Financial Corp.	Signet Banking Corporation			Wells Fargo
1994	NBD Bancorp	AmeriFed Financial	NBD Bancorp	$149 million	$323.7 million	JPMorgan Chase
1994	BankAmerica	Continental Illinois National Bank	BankAmerica			Bank of America
1994	First Fidelity Bank	Bank of Baltimore	First Fidelity Bank			Wells Fargo
1995	NBD Bancorp	Deerbank Corp.	NBD Bancorp	$120 million	$253.5 million	JPMorgan Chase
1995	NBD Bancorp	First Chicago Bank	First Chicago NBD Corporation	$5.3 billion	$11.2 billion	JPMorgan Chase
1995	BB&T	Southern National Bank	BB&T	$2.2 billion	$4.6 billion	Truist
1995	Fleet Financial Group	Shawmut Bank	Fleet Financial Group	$3.7 billion	$7.8 billion	Bank of America
1995	First Union	First Fidelity Bank	First Union			Wells Fargo
1996	Wells Fargo	First Interstate Bancorp	Wells Fargo	$11.3 billion	$23.2 billion	Wells Fargo
1996	Union Bank	Bank of California	Union Bank of California	$993 million	$2 billion	U.S. Bancorp
1996	Chemical Bank	Chase Manhattan Bank	Chase Manhattan Bank	$10 billion	$20.5 billion	JPMorgan Chase
1996	CoreStates Financial Corporation	Meridian Bancorp	CoreStates Financial Corporation	$3.2 billion	$6.6 billion	Wells Fargo
1996	Bank of Boston	BayBank	BankBoston	$2 billion	$4.1 billion	Bank of America
1996	First Union	First Fidelity Bank	First Union			Wells Fargo
1996	First Union	Center Financial Corporation (CenterBank)	First Union			Wells Fargo
1996	Fleet Financial Group	National Westminster Bank USA	Fleet Financial Group			Bank of America
1996	Crestar Bank	Citizens Bancorp (Laurel, MD)	Crestar Bank			Truist
1997	First Nationwide Bank	California Federal Bank	California Federal Bank (1st Nationwide rebranded as "Cal Fed.")	$1.2 billion	$2.4 billion	Citigroup
1997	NationsBank	Boatmen's Bancshares	NationsBank	$9.6 billion	$19.3 billion	Bank of America
1997	National City Corp.	First of America Bank	National City Corp.	$7.1 billion	$14.2 billion	PNC Financial Services
1997	First Union	Signet Banking Corporation	First Union			Wells Fargo
1997	First Bank System	U.S. Bancorp of Oregon	U.S. Bancorp	$9 billion	$18.1 billion	U.S. Bancorp
1997	BB&T	United Carolina Bank	BB&T	$1.25 billion	$2.5 billion	Truist
1997	Huntington Bancshares	First Michigan Bank Corporation	Huntington Bancshares	$897 million	$1.8 billion	Huntington Bancshares
1997	Washington Mutual	Great Western Bank	Washington Mutual	$6.8 billion	$13.6 billion	JPMorgan Chase
1997	Banc One Corporation	First USA	Banc One Corporation	$7.9 billion	$15.8 billion	JPMorgan Chase
1998	American National Bank of Texas	The First National Bank of Wills Point	American National Bank of Texas			American National Bank of Texas
1998	Astoria Bank	Long Island Savings Bank	Astoria Bank	$1.8 billion	$3.6 billion	Santander Bank
1998	NationsBank	Barnett Bank	NationsBank	$15.5 billion	$30.6 billion	Bank of America
1998	First Union	CoreStates Financial Corporation (Including predecessor Bank of North America, the first bank in the United States)	First Union	$17.1 billion	$33.8 billion	Wells Fargo
1998	NationsBank	BankAmerica	Bank of America	$62 billion	$122.5 billion	Bank of America
1998	Golden State Bancorp	California Federal Bank	Golden State Bancorp	$2.5 billion	$4.9 billion	Citigroup
1998	Norwest Corporation	Wells Fargo	Wells Fargo	$32 billion	$63.2 billion	Wells Fargo
1998	Star Banc Corporation	Firstar Corporation	Firstar Corporation	$7.3 billion	$14.4 billion	U.S. Bancorp
1998	Banc One Corporation	First Chicago NBD Corporation	Bank One Corporation	$30 billion	$59.3 billion	JPMorgan Chase
1998	Bank One Corporation	First Commerce Corporation	Bank One Corporation	$3.5 billion	$6.9 billion	JPMorgan Chase
1998	Travelers Group	Citicorp	Citigroup	$140 billion	$276.5 billion	Citigroup
1998	SunTrust	Crestar Bank	SunTrust			Truist
1998	Washington Mutual	H.F. Ahmanson & Co.	Washington Mutual			JPMorgan Chase
1999	American National Bank of Texas	The Bank of Van Zandt	American National Bank of Texas			American National Bank of Texas
1999	Fleet Financial Group	BankBoston	FleetBoston Financial	$16 billion	$30.9 billion	Bank of America
1999	Deutsche Bank	Bankers Trust	Deutsche Bank			Deutsche Bank
1999	HSBC Holdings plc	Republic New York Corporation	HSBC Bank USA			HSBC Bank USA
1999	Firstar Corporation	Mercantile Bancorporation	Firstar Corporation	$10.6 billion	$20.5 billion	U.S. Bancorp
1999	AmSouth Bancorporation	First American National Bank	AmSouth Bancorporation	$6.3 billion	$12.2 billion	Regions Financial Corporation
2000	People's Heritage Financial Group	Banknorth Group	Banknorth Group	$722.6 million	$1.4 billion	TD Bank
2000	Wells Fargo	National Bank of Alaska	Wells Fargo	$907 million	$1.7 billion	Wells Fargo
2000	Wells Fargo	First Security Corporation	Wells Fargo			Wells Fargo
2000	National Commerce Bancorporation	CCB Financial Corporation	National Commerce Financial Corporation	$1.94 billion	$3.6 billion	Truist
2000	Chase Manhattan Bank	J.P. Morgan & Co.	JPMorgan Chase	$30 billion	$56.1 billion	JPMorgan Chase
2000	UBS	Paine Webber	UBS			UBS
2000	BB&T	One Valley Bancorp	BB&T	$1.2 billion	$2.2 billion	Truist
2001	Washington Mutual	Bank United Corporation	Washington Mutual	$1.5 billion	$2.7 billion	JPMorgan Chase
2001	Firstar Corporation	U.S. Bancorp	U.S. Bancorp	$21 billion	$38.2 billion	U.S. Bancorp
2001	FleetBoston Financial	Summit Bancorp	FleetBoston Financial	$7 billion	$12.7 billion	Bank of America
2001	Royal Bank of Canada	Centura Bank	RBC Centura Bank	$2.3 billion	$4.2 billion	PNC Financial Services
2001	Fifth Third Bank	Old Kent Financial Corporation	Fifth Third Bank			Fifth Third Bank
2001	Standard Federal Bank	Michigan National Bank	Standard Federal Bank			Bank of America
2001	First Union	Wachovia	Wachovia (Adopted the acquired company's name)	$13.4 billion	$24.4 billion	Wells Fargo
2002	Citigroup	Golden State Bancorp	Citigroup	$5.8 billion	$10.4 billion	Citigroup
2002	Washington Mutual	Dime Bancorp	Washington Mutual			JPMorgan Chase
2002	HSBC Holdings plc	Household International	HSBC Bank USA			HSBC Bank USA
2003	BB&T	1st Virginia Bank	BB&T			Truist
2003	M&T Bank	Allfirst Bank	M&T Bank			M&T Bank
2003	New York Community Bank	Roslyn Bancorp	New York Community Bank	$1.58 billion	$2.8 billion	Flagstar Bank
2004	New Haven Savings Bank	Savings Bank of Manchester, Tolland Bank	NewAlliance Bank			NewAlliance Bank
2004	North Fork Bank	The Trust Company of New Jersey	North Fork Bank	$726 million	$1.2 billion	Capital One
2004	Bank of America	FleetBoston Financial	Bank of America	$47 billion	$80.1 billion	Bank of America
2004	JPMorgan Chase	Bank One Corporation	JPMorgan Chase	$58 billion	$98.9 billion	JPMorgan Chase
2004	Banco Popular	Quaker City Bank	Banco Popular			Banco Popular
2004	Regions Financial Corporation	Union Planters Bank	Regions Financial Corporation	$5.9 billion	$10.1 billion	Regions Financial Corporation
2004	SunTrust	National Commerce Financial Corporation	SunTrust	$6.98 billion	$11.9 billion	Truist
2004	Citizens Financial Group	Charter One Financial	Citizens Financial Group	$10.5 billion	$17.9 billion	Citizens Financial Group
2004	Sovereign Bank	Seacoast Financial Services Corporation	Sovereign Bank	$1.1 billion	$1.9 billion	Santander Bank
2004	Wachovia	SouthTrust	Wachovia	$14.3 billion	$24.4 billion	Wells Fargo
2005	Sovereign Bank	Waypoint Bank	Sovereign Bank	$980 million	$1.6 billion	Santander Bank
2005	PNC Financial Services	Riggs Bank	PNC Financial Services	$0.78 billion	$1.3 billion	PNC Financial Services
2005	Capital One	Hibernia National Bank	Capital One	$4.9 billion	$8.1 billion	Capital One
2005	Bank of America	MBNA Corporation	Bank of America Card Services	$35 billion	$57.7 billion	Bank of America
2006	Wachovia	Westcorp (holding company for WFS Financial Inc and Western Financial Bank)	Wachovia	$3.91 billion	$6.2 billion	Wells Fargo
2006	Huntington Bancshares	Unizan Financial Corporation	Huntington Bancshares	$587 million	$937.5 million	Huntington Bancshares
2006	NewAlliance Bank	Cornerstone Bank	NewAlliance Bank			NewAlliance Bank
2006	Capital One	North Fork Bank	Capital One	$13.2 billion	$21.1 billion	Capital One
2006	Wachovia	Golden West Financial	Wachovia	$25 billion	$39.9 billion	Wells Fargo
2006	Sovereign Bank	Independence Community Bank	Sovereign Bank	$3.6 billion	$5.7 billion	Santander Bank
2006	Regions Financial Corporation	AmSouth Bancorporation	Regions Financial Corporation	$10 billion	$16 billion	Regions Financial Corporation
2007	Bank of America	U.S. Trust Corporation	Bank of America Private Bank	$3.3 billion	$5.1 billion	Bank of America
2007	Citizens Banking Corporation	Republic Bancorp	Citizens Republic Bancorp	$1.048 billion	$1.6 billion	Huntington Bancshares
2007	Banco Bilbao Vizcaya Argentaria	Compass Bancshares	BBVA Compass	$9.8 billion	$15.2 billion	PNC Financial Services
2007	Bank of America	LaSalle Bank	Bank of America	$21 billion	$32.6 billion	Bank of America
2007	State Street Corporation	Investors Financial Services Corporation	State Street Corporation	$4.2 billion	$6.5 billion	State Street Corporation
2007	Bank of New York	Mellon Financial Corporation	Bank of New York Mellon	$18.3 billion	$28.4 billion	BNY
2007	Huntington Bancshares	Sky Financial Group	Huntington Bancshares	$3.6 billion	$5.6 billion	Huntington Bancshares
2007	Wachovia	A. G. Edwards	Wachovia Securities	$6.8 billion	$10.6 billion	Wells Fargo
2007	M&T Bank	Partners Trust Financial Group	M&T Bank			M&T Bank
2008	People's United Financial	Chittenden Corporation	People's United Financial	$1.9 billion	$2.8 billion	M&T Bank
2008	RBC Bank USA	Alabama National BanCorporation	RBC Bank USA	$1.6 billion	$2.4 billion	PNC Financial Services
2008	American National Bank of Texas	Citizens National Bank	American National Bank of Texas			American National Bank of Texas
2008	American National Bank of Texas	Dallas National Bank	American National Bank of Texas			American National Bank of Texas
2008	TD Banknorth	Commerce Bancorp	TD Bank	$8.5 billion	$12.7 billion	TD Bank
2008	JPMorgan Chase	Bear Stearns	JPMorgan Chase	$236 million	$352.9 million	JPMorgan Chase
2008	JPMorgan Chase	Washington Mutual	JPMorgan Chase	$1.9 billion	$2.8 billion	JPMorgan Chase
2008	Fifth Third Bank	First Charter Bank	Fifth Third Bank	$1.1 billion	$1.6 billion	Fifth Third Bank
2008	U.S. Bancorp	Downey Savings and Loan	U.S. Bancorp			U.S. Bancorp
2008	Wells Fargo	Wachovia	Wells Fargo	$15.1 billion	$22.6 billion	Wells Fargo
2008	PNC Financial Services	National City Corp.	PNC Financial Services	$5.08 billion	$7.6 billion	PNC Financial Services
2008	Bank of America	Merrill Lynch	Merrill	$50 billion	$74.8 billion	Bank of America
2009	M&T Bank	Provident Bank of Maryland	M&T Bank			M&T Bank
2009	Capital One	Chevy Chase Bank	Capital One	$520 million	$780.4 million	Capital One
2009	M&T Bank	Bradford Bank	M&T Bank			M&T Bank
2009	BB&T	Colonial Bancgroup	BB&T			Truist
2009	New York Community Bank	AmTrust Bank	New York Community Bank			Flagstar Bank
2010	TD Bank	South Financial Group	TD Bank	$191 million	$282 million	TD Bank
2011	M&T Bank	Wilmington Trust	M&T Bank			M&T Bank
2011	Hancock Holding Company	Whitney Holding Corporation	Hancock Holding Company	$1.4 billion	$2 billion	Hancock Whitney
2011	Harris Bank	Marshall & Ilsley	BMO Harris Bank	$4.1 billion	$5.9 billion	BMO Bank
2011	Comerica	Sterling Bank	Comerica	$1.03 billion	$1.5 billion	Fifth Third Bank
2012	Capital One	ING Direct USA	Capital One	$9 billion	$12.6 billion	Capital One
2012	PNC Financial Services	RBC Bank USA	PNC Financial Services	$3.45 billion	$4.8 billion	PNC Financial Services
2012	BB&T	BankAtlantic	BB&T	$301 million	$422.1 million	Truist
2013	NBT Bank	Alliance Bank	NBT Bank			NBT Bank
2013	FirstMerit Corporation	Citizens Republic Bancorp	FirstMerit Corporation	$912 million	$1.3 billion	Huntington Bancshares
2013	Provident New York Bancorp	Sterling Bancorp	Sterling Bancorp	$344 million	$475.5 million	Santander Bank
2014	Pacific Western Bank	CapitalSource	Pacific Western Bank	$2.29 billion	$3.1 billion	Banc of California
2014	Old National Bank	United Bank & Trust	Old National Bank	$173 million	$235.3 million	Old National Bank
2015	First Citizens BancShares	First Citizens Bancorporation	First Citizens BancShares	$676 million	$918.2 million	First Citizens BancShares
2015	Sterling Bancorp	Hudson Valley Bank	Sterling Bancorp	$539 million	$732.1 billion	Santander Bank
2015	BB&T	Susquehanna Bank	BB&T	$2.5 billion	$3.4 billion	Truist
2015	Pacific Western Bank	Square 1 Bank	Pacific Western Bank	$894 million	$1.2 billion	Banc of California
2015	M&T Bank	Hudson City Bancorp	M&T Bank	$3.7 billion	$5 billion	M&T Bank
2015	Royal Bank of Canada	City National Bank	City National Bank	$5.4 billion	$7.3 billion	City National Bank
2016	BB&T	National Penn	BB&T	$1.8 billion	$2.4 billion	Truist
2016	Huntington Bancshares	FirstMerit Corporation	Huntington Bancshares	$3.4 billion	$4.6 billion	Huntington Bancshares
2016	KeyBank	First Niagara Bank	KeyBank	$4.1 billion	$5.5 billion	KeyBank
2017	FNB Corporation	Yadkin Financial	FNB Corporation	$1.4 billion	$1.8 billion	FNB Corporation
2017	Canadian Imperial Bank of Commerce	The PrivateBank	CIBC Bank USA	$17.7 billion	$23.2 billion	CIBC Bank USA
2017	Pinnacle Financial Partners	BNC Bank	Pinnacle Financial Partners	$1.9 billion	$2.5 billion	Pinnacle Financial Partners
2017	Sterling Bancorp	Astoria Bank	Sterling Bancorp	$2.2 billion	$2.9 billion	Santander Bank
2017	First Horizon National Corporation	Capital Bank Financial	First Horizon National Corporation	$2.81 billion	$3.7 billion	First Horizon Corporation
2018	American National Bank of Texas	First State Bank	American National Bank of Texas			American National Bank of Texas
2019	Synovus	Florida Community Bank	Synovus	$2.9 billion	$3.7 billion	Pinnacle Financial Partners
2019	Chemical Financial Corporation	TCF Financial Corporation	TCF Financial Corporation	$3.6 billion	$4.5 billion	Huntington Bancshares
2019	Fifth Third Bank	MB Financial	Fifth Third Bank	$4.7 billion	$5.9 billion	Fifth Third Bank
2019	BB&T	SunTrust	Truist	$66 billion	$83.1 billion	Truist
2020	First Horizon National Corporation	IberiaBank	First Horizon National Corporation	$3.9 billion	$4.9 billion	First Horizon Corporation
2020	United Bank	CresCom Bank	United Bank	$1.1 billion	$1.4 billion	United Bank
2020	CenterState Bank	South State Bank	SouthState Bank	$3 billion	$3.7 billion	SouthState Bank
2021	Huntington Bancshares	TCF Financial Corporation	Huntington Bancshares	$6 billion	$7.1 billion	Huntington Bancshares
2021	PNC Financial Services	BBVA USA	PNC Financial Services	$11.6 billion	$13.8 billion	PNC Financial Services
2021	BancorpSouth	Cadence Bank	Cadence Bank	$2.8 billion	$3.3 billion	Huntington Bancshares
2022	Webster Bank	Sterling Bancorp	Webster Bank	$5 billion	$5.5 billion	Santander Bank
2022	First Citizens BancShares	CIT Group	First Citizens BancShares	$2.2 billion	$2.4 billion	First Citizens BancShares
2022	Old National Bank	First Midwest Bancorp	Old National Bank	$6.5 billion	$7.2 billion	Old National Bank
2022	First Interstate BancSystem	Great Western Bank	First Interstate BancSystem	$2 billion	$2.2 billion	First Interstate BancSystem
2022	M&T Bank	People's United Financial	M&T Bank	$8.3 billion	$9.1 billion	M&T Bank
2022	Citizens Financial Group	Investors Bank	Citizens Financial Group	$3.5 billion	$3.9 billion	Citizens Financial Group
2022	New York Community Bank	Flagstar Bank	Flagstar Bank	$2.6 billion	$2.9 billion	Flagstar Bank
2022	U.S. Bancorp	MUFG Union Bank	U.S. Bancorp	$8 billion	$8.8 billion	U.S. Bancorp
2023	BMO Harris Bank	Bank of the West	BMO Bank	$16 billion	$16.9 billion	BMO Bank
2023	Columbia Bank	Umpqua Holdings Corporation	Columbia Bank	$5 billion	$5.3 billion	Columbia Bank
2023	Toronto-Dominion Bank	Cowen	TD Cowen	$1.3 billion	$1.4 billion	Toronto-Dominion Bank
2023	First Citizens BancShares	Silicon Valley Bank	First Citizens BancShares	$16.5 billion	$17.4 billion	First Citizens BancShares
2023	Flagstar Bank	Signature Bank	Flagstar Bank	$2.7 billion	$2.9 billion	Flagstar Bank
2023	JPMorgan Chase	First Republic Bank	JPMorgan Chase	$10.6 billion	$11.2 billion	JPMorgan Chase
2023	Banc of California	Pacific Western Bank	Banc of California	$1.04 billion	$1.1 billion	Banc of California
2024	Old National Bank	CapStar Bank	Old National Bank	$344 million	$353 million	Old National Bank
2025	SouthState Bank	Independent Bank Group	SouthState Bank	$2 billion	$2 billion	SouthState Bank
2025	UMB Financial Corporation	Heartland Financial	UMB Financial Corporation	$2 billion	$2 billion	UMB Financial Corporation
2025	Atlantic Union Bank	Sandy Spring Bank	Atlantic Union Bank	$1.6 billion	$1.6 billion	Atlantic Union Bank
2025	Renasant Bank	The First Bank	Renasant Bank	$1.2 billion	$1.2 billion	Renasant Bank
2025	Old National Bank	Bremer Bank	Old National Bank	$1.4 billion	$1.4 billion	Old National Bank
2025	Capital One	Discover Financial	Capital One	$35.3 billion	$35.3 billion	Capital One
2025	Columbia Bank	Pacific Premier Bancorp	Columbia Bank	$2 billion	$2 billion	Columbia Bank
2025	Berkshire Hills Bancorp	Brookline Bancorp	Beacon Financial Corporation	$1.1 billion	$1.1 billion	Beacon Financial Corporation
2025	Huntington Bancshares	Veritex Community Bank	Huntington Bancshares	$1.9 billion	$1.9 billion	Huntington Bancshares
2026	Pinnacle Financial Partners	Synovus	Pinnacle Financial Partners	$8.6 billion	$8.6 billion	Pinnacle Financial Partners
2026	PNC Financial Services	FirstBank Holding Co	PNC Financial Services	$4.1 billion	$4.1 billion	PNC Financial Services
2026	Fifth Third Bank	Comerica	Fifth Third Bank	$10.9 billion	$10.9 billion	Fifth Third Bank
2026	Huntington Bancshares	Cadence Bank	Huntington Bancshares	$7.4 billion	$7.4 billion	Huntington Bancshares
2026	Santander Bank	Webster Bank	Santander Bank	$12.3 billion	$12.3 billion	Santander Bank

== Mergers chart ==
Chart of U.S. bank mergers

This 2012 chart shows some of the mergers noted above. Solid arrows point from the acquiring bank to the acquired one. The lines are labeled with the year of the deal and color-coded from blue (older) to red (newer). Dotted arrows point to the final merged entity.
