= New York Institute of Technology School of Management =

Business school

NYIT School of Management
- Type: Private
- Established: 1955
- Affiliations: New York Institute of Technology
- President: Jerry Balentine, D.O.
- Dean: Jaishankar Ganesh Ph.D., M.B.A.
- Location: 40.769747°N 73.982505°W
- Campus: Urban/Suburban
- Website: www.nyit.edu/management

The New York Institute of Technology School of Management (also known as NYITSOM) is the business school of the New York Institute of Technology. The NYIT School of Management offers graduate degrees, including Master of Business Administration degree (M.B.A.) and Master of Science degree in Risk Management (M.S.R.M.) among others. The school also offers many undergraduate degrees, including in business administration, management, finance, and marketing at its campuses in United States, Canada, and China. The School of Management also collaborates with multiple colleges and universities worldwide, offering joint programs, dual degrees, summer study programs, study abroad options, and faculty and student exchange.

The NYIT School of Management is led by Dean Jaishankar Ganesh, Ph.D., MBA (89). All domestic and global campuses of New York Institute of Technology School of Management are accredited by the Association to Advance Collegiate Schools of Business (AACSB)

In 2015, NYIT's MBA program was ranked #1 in the United States in terms of salary-to-debt ratio. According to the survey by SoFi, graduates of NYIT's MBA program make an average of $126,068 per year, and have an average debt of $50,308.

== History ==
NYIT School of Management was founded in 1955. 1970 was the year that NYIT was accredited by the Middle States Association of Colleges and Secondary Schools, the regional body that oversees educational standards. That year, NYIT also launched its first master's program, a Master of Business Administration. In February 2015, NYIT's School of Management academic programs at all campuses received accreditation from the AACSB (Association to Advance Collegiate Schools of Business).

== Campus ==
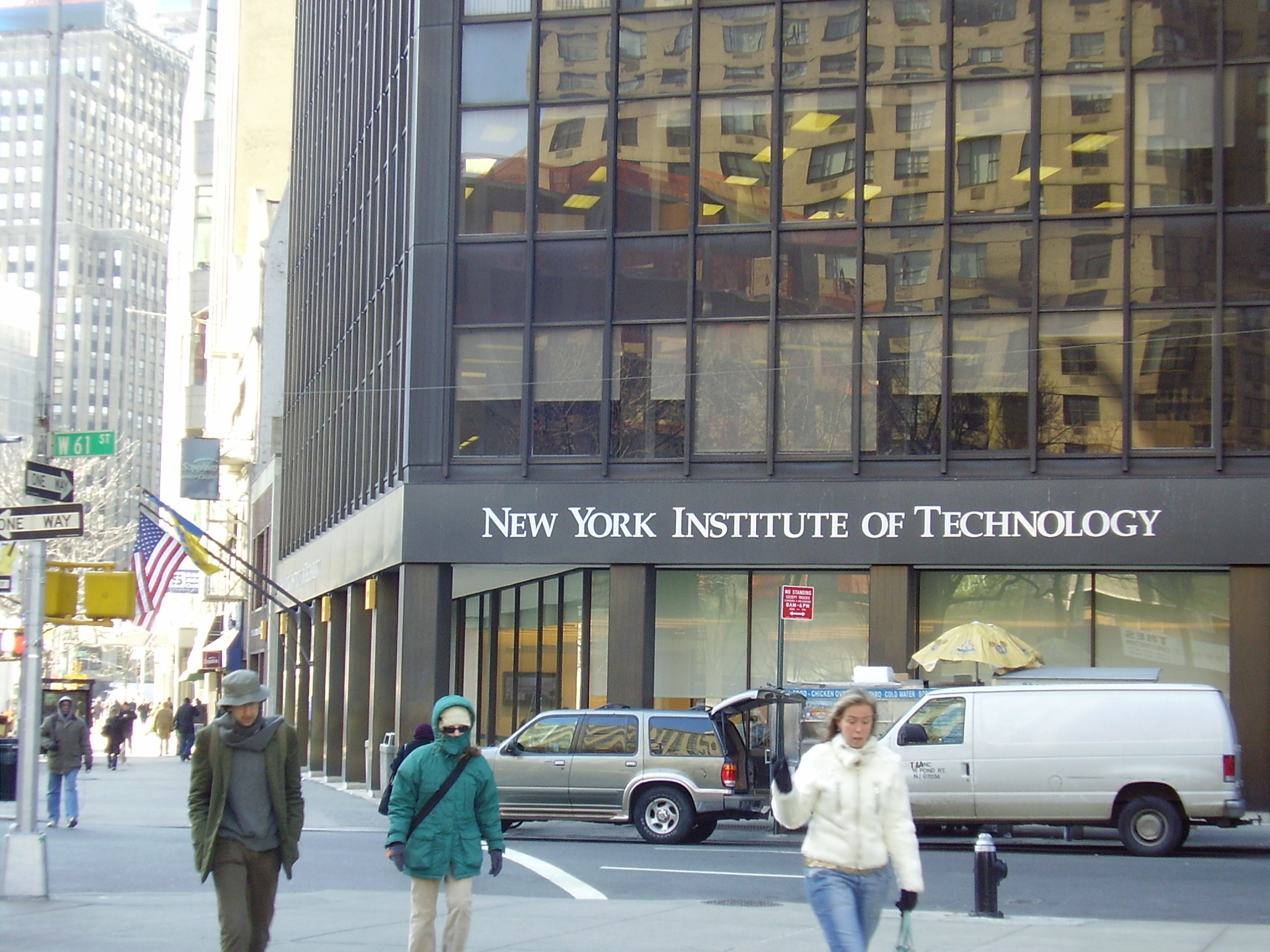
A building of New York Institute of Technology on its Manhattan campus

NYIT's School of Management is located on two of NYIT's New York campuses, in Old Westbury and Manhattan. NYIT's School of Management is also located in Canada (Vancouver), China (Nanchang), China (Nanjing), China (Shanghai) and China (Beijing).

== Academics ==
New York Institute of Technology is chartered by the board of regents of the University of the State of New York.

The NYIT School of Management offers graduate degrees, including Master of Business Administration degree (M.B.A.) and Master of Science degree in Risk Management (M.S.R.M), among others. The school also offers many undergraduate degrees, including in business administration, finance, management, and marketing at its overseas campuses in United States, Canada, and China. The School of Management also collaborates with multiple colleges and universities worldwide, offering joint programs, dual degrees, summer study programs, study abroad options, and faculty and student exchange.

== The Corporate M.B.A. Program ==
NYIT offers executive M.B.A. (E.M.B.A.) programs to senior Chinese business managers in partnership with Tsinghua University, Jinan University, Renmin University of China, and Xiamen University. The students, after a successful completion of the program, will receive an E.M.B.A. degree from NYIT, in addition to a Business Administration Certificate from the NYIT's partner Institute through which the student come to attend the NYIT program.

== Facilities ==
New York Institute of Technology School of Management has state-of-the-art computer rooms and technology-based learning facilities, as well as several on‑campus business incubators.

== Research centers ==
Research centers at New York Institute of Technology School of Management include:

- Entrepreneurial Studies
- Hospitality Management
- Human Resource Studies
- International Business Studies
- Risk Management

== In Reality: Lessons from Leaders and Entrepreneurs podcast ==
The School of Management podcast hosted by John Rebecchi (M.BA. ’83), Ph.D., interviews guests with varied backgrounds and experience. In each episode, the guests offer perspectives on problem solving, decision making, and how to confront the challenges of starting and running a business.

== Admissions ==
Admission to the NYIT School of Management considers factors such as academic record, standardized test scores, accomplishments outside of the classroom, recommendations, and essays. For graduate admission, a baccalaureate degree from an accredited college with a minimum 3.0/4.0 GPA is required. The acceptance rate was 65% to the graduate programs as of 2015.

== Student life ==
NYIT School of Management has over 50 active student clubs.

== Notable alumni ==
- Monte N. Redman, president and chief executive officer and a member of the board of directors of Astoria Financial Corporation and its subsidiary Astoria Bank.
- Richard J. Daly, former CEO, Broadridge Financial Solutions.
