= Fidelity Bank =

Fidelity Bank may refer to the following commercial banks:

- Fidelity Bank Ghana
- Fidelity Bank Nigeria
- FidelityBank, full name Fidelity Commercial Bank Limited, Kenya

== See also ==
- First Fidelity Bank, Oklahoma City
- Fidelity Investments, a financial services firm based in Boston, Massachusetts
- Fidelity Trust Company, a former bank in Philadelphia, Pennsylvania
