= Nathaniel Brown =

Nathaniel Brown may refer to:

- Nathaniel Brown Palmer (1799–1877), American explorer, sailing captain, and ship designer
- Nathaniel Brown (actor) (born 1988), American actor and director
- Nathaniel Brown (footballer) (born 2003), German footballer
- Nat Brown (born 1981), English footballer

== See also ==
- Nathaniel B. Browne (1819–1875), American lawyer, financier, and government official
