= BHG Financial =

American financial services company

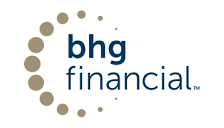
- Formerly: Bankers Healthcare Group
- Type: Privately held company
- Industry: Financial services
- Founded: 2001; 25 years ago
- Founders: Albert Crawford, Eric Castro, and Bobby Castro
- Headquarters: Davie, Florida, United States
- Area served: United States
- Key people: Albert Crawford (CEO & Chairman of the Board), Harold Carpenter (CFO, Pinnacle Bank), Jim Crawford (EVP)
- Website: bhgfinancial.com

BHG Financial (formerly Bankers Healthcare Group) is an American company headquartered in Fort Lauderdale, Florida and Syracuse, New York. BHG was founded in 2001 and initially provided loans to medical professionals before expanding its services to other licensed professionals, offering personal loans for debt consolidation. BHG Financial is partially owned by Pinnacle Bank, a subsidiary of Pinnacle Financial Partners.

== History ==
BHG Financial was co-founded by Al Crawford, Eric Castro, and Bobby Castro, as Bankers Healthcare Group in Davie, Florida with an initial capital of $25,000. Al Crawford is the CEO and chairman. Crawford started his career at the New York Futures Exchange (NYFE) in 1984 and later joined an investment banking firm specializing in securitizations.

BHG Financial originally started out lending to professionals in the medical industry. The company's first customer was a doctor who needed $100,000 in working capital after purchasing a second practice.

In February 2015, Pinnacle Bank, a subsidiary of Pinnacle Financial Partners, an American commercial banking firm headquartered in Nashville, Tennessee, acquired a 30% stake in the company for $75 million, and in 2016, they acquired an additional 19% for $114 million.

By 2018, BHG Financial's revenue grew to approximately $216 million. The company expanded into small business lending with a new license to offer SBA loans in 2018.

It was announced in August 2019 that Dan McSherry would lead the company's corporate finance and investor relations as chief financial officer (CFO) at the Syracuse headquarters, replacing Ed Durant. McSherry initially joined the company in 2013 and previously held roles at Lockheed Martin Corp., UBS Financial, and Charles Schwab Corporation.

The company reported that it has originated more than $17 billion in loans. In 2020, the company expanded into the Asset-Backed Securities (ABS) market and completed six transactions. Since then, it has completed 11 transactions.

In 2022, BHG Financial moved its headquarters to The Main Las Olas office on Las Olas Boulevard in Fort Lauderdale, Florida.

In 2024, the company appointed Tyler Crawford as its first President.

In August 2025, BHG Financial completed a $500 million ABS transaction, the largest ABS transaction for the company to date.

== Recognition ==
BHG Financial has been named by Fortune magazine as a Great Place to Work consecutively since 2016, ranking as a top company in the magazine's Best Workplaces Lists for millennials, women, financial services, and medium-sized companies.

In 2020, it was listed by Airzent and Best Companies Group as one of the country's best financial technology companies to work for. In February 2022, the South Florida Business Journal also named BHG Financial to its Best Places to Work list. BHG Financial received a Cigna Gold Healthy Workforce Designation in 2024.

BHG Financial was named to Fortune's 2026 Best Workplaces in Financial Services and Insurance list.

In 2026, CEO and Co-Founder Al Crawford was ranked No.19 on Glassdoor's Top 50 CEOs list.
