= Mount Vernon Trust Company =

Historic bank building in New York, U.S.

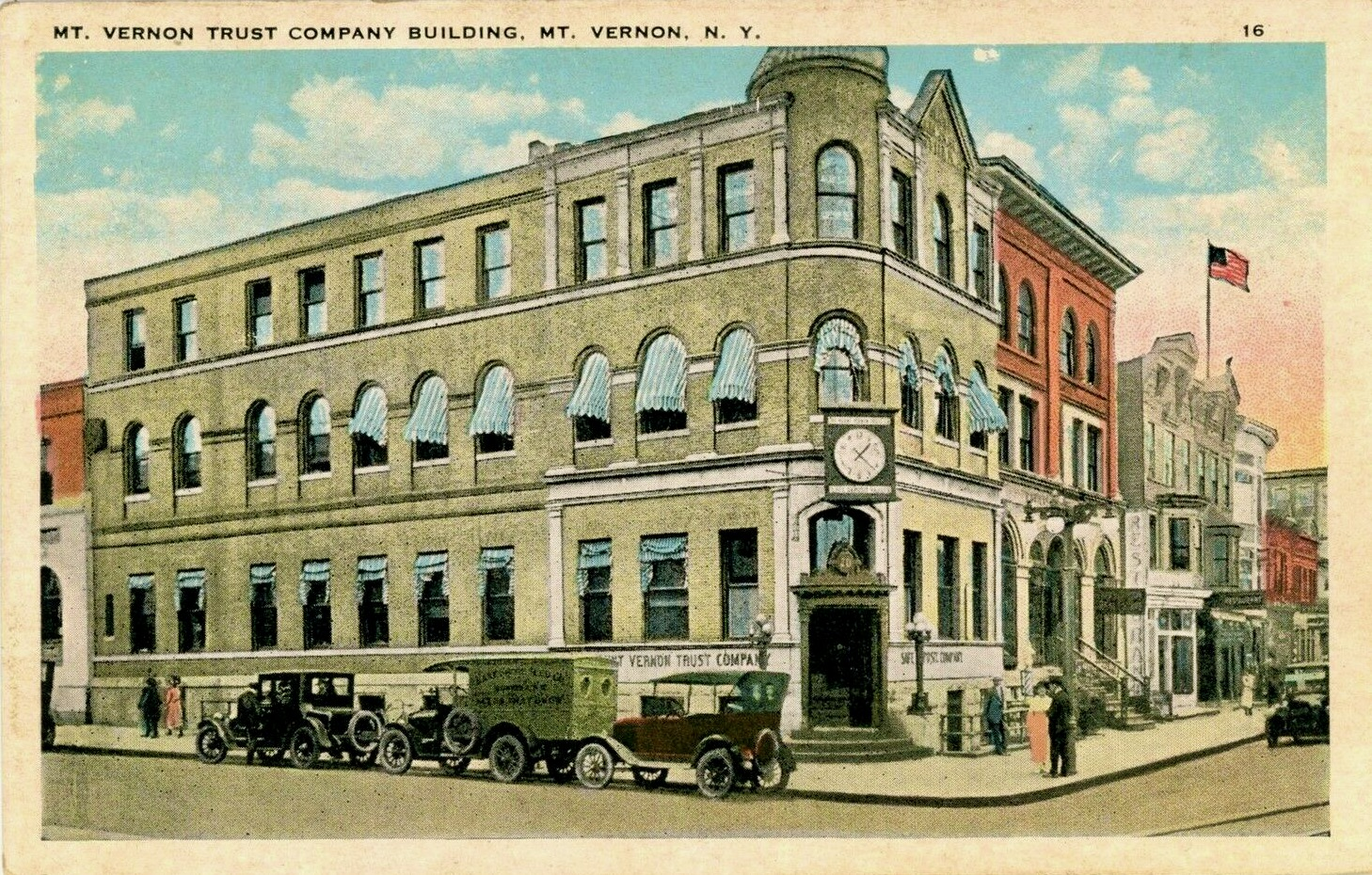
- Mt Vernon Trust Co. Building.
- Industry: Bank trust company
- Founded: 1903
- Founder: A. A. Lisman, Dr. Archibald M. Campbell, John T. Wintjen, and Mark D. Stiles
- Fate: Acquired on March 28, 1952
- Successor: County Trust Company
- Headquarters: 20 East First Street, Mount Vernon, New York
- Key people: Dr. Archibald M. Campbell (chairman, CEO); Mark D. Stiles (president)
- Products: Financial services
- Total assets: $1,500,000

The Mount Vernon Trust Company, was a bank that operated in Mount Vernon, New York from 1903 until its acquisition by County Trust Company in 1952. It was chartered as a bank on March 5, 1903, and was largest commercial bank in Westchester County, New York.

== History ==
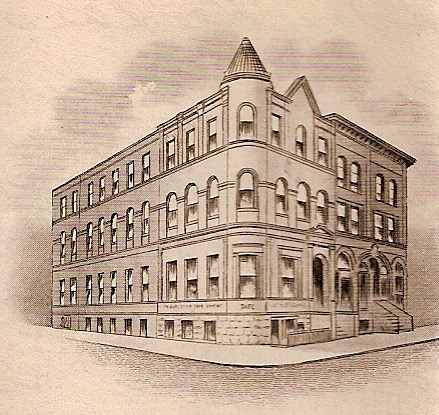
Mt Vernon Trust Co. Logo.

On December 25, 1902, the Bank of Mount Vernon was sold to businessmen including A. A. Lisman, Dr. Archibald M. Campbell, John T. Wintjen, and Mark D. Stiles. The price paid for the stock was $705 a share. The name of the bank changed to operate as a trust company and became the Mount Vernon Trust Company. It was opened for business on May 31, 1903, in the same building as the old Bank of Mount Vernon was in, on First Street and Third Avenue. The building was built by Dawson Archer.

The directors were: J. E. Borne, Charles H. Fancher, J. M. Donald, F. T. Martin, S. H. Voorchies, A. A. Lisman, Samuel Well, A. Murray Young, George R. Dyer and a number of businessman from Mount Vernon. By April 1, 1903, Campbell became president, Lisman became vice-president, Jesse Lantz, 2nd vice-president, and Daniel M. Hopping, secretary & treasurer. On October 1, 1904, deposits of the Trust Company had grown to $1,162,000. They declared a quarterly dividend of 1% to stockholders of record on November 1, 1904.

In 1928, the bank building on First Street and Third Avenue was rebuilt by A. F. Barbaresi and Son. The opening on June 16, 1928, was attended by thousands of people. Mark D. Stiles, president of the Trust Company, presented a gold watch and chain to Anthony Pizzarello, superintendent of construction, as an appreciation for his services. The new building cost over $500,000. The bank had two branches to serve the east and west sections of the city.

On July 18, 1930, the American National Bank and Trust Company merged with the Mount Vernon Trust Company. The merger raised the capital of the Mount Vernon Trust Co. to $1,500,000 from $1,000,000. Resources of the new bank were $31,250.283, making it the largest commercial bank in Westchester County, New York. Mark D. Stiles, was president of the bank and Archibald M. Campbell was chairman. The Mount Vernon Trust Company's first president for 21 years and chairman of the board of directors, Archibald M. Campbell died on August 31, 1930, in Westchester, New York.

On March 28, 1952, stockholders of the County Trust Company of White Plains, New York, approved the merger of the Mount Vernon Trust Co. with County Trust Co., which became effective on April 1. Fred E. Goldman was president of the Mount Vernon Trust company, and he became senior Vice-President of the merged banks. After the merger, resources of the County Trust Co. were $200 million. A quarterly dividend of 50 cents a share was declared effective April 15. In November 1953, County Trust Co. sold the former Mount Vernon Trust Co., building at First Street and Third Avenue to the Dutchess Owners Inc., of White Plains, New York.

== See also ==
- List of bank mergers in the United States
