= Monte N. Redman =

- Born: 1951 (age 74–75); New York City, United States
- Education: New York Institute of Technology (1977)
- Occupation: Banker
- Known for: Former CEO of Astoria Bank

Monte N. Redman is an American banker that was the director of Sterling Bancorp as well as the charitable organization the Tourette Association of America. Redman joined Astoria Bank in 1977 and worked his way up to becoming the president and chief executive officer of Astoria Bank and Astoria Financial Corporation before they was acquired by Sterling Bancorp. He was also a board member of the New York Bankers Association.

== Early life and education ==
Redman graduated magna cum laude from New York Institute of Technology with a Bachelor of Science in accounting in 1977.

== Career ==
Redman began working for Astoria Bank after graduating in 1977. Two years later in 1979, he was appointed assistant controller of the bank. In 1985, he was appointed vice president and investment officer. Three years later in 1989, he was promoted to senior vice president, treasurer, and chief financial officer. In 1997, he was appointed executive vice president.

In June 2011, Redman was appointed as a director, president, and chief executive officer of Astoria Financial Corporation, the holding company for Astoria Bank before it was acquired by Sterling Bancorp. He continued as director of Sterling Bancorp after the acquisition.

He is also a board member of the New York Bankers Association.

== Other interests and recognition ==
In 2005, he was elected chairman of the Tourette Association of America.

In May 2011, Redman was honored by the Queens Botanical Garden in New York.
