= National Bank of Delaware =

Bank headquartered in Wilmington, DE

The National Bank of Delaware (founded as the Bank of Delaware) was the first bank chartered in the U.S. state of Delaware. Based in Wilmington, the bank operated independently from 1795 to 1929, when it was merged into the Security Trust Company, also of Wilmington.

== History ==
=== Independent operation ===
The bank was formally organized on June 1, 1795, and received its charter on February 9, 1796, from the Delaware General Assembly with capital stock of $100,000. With Joseph Tatnall as president and John Hayes as cashier, it opened at Fourth and Market Streets on August 17. In 1816, the bank moved to a new building on the east corner of Sixth and Market Streets. The bank was issued a new charter in 1820, and doubled its stock's par value by 1850.

On July 16, 1865, it received a national charter under the National Banking Act, and was renamed the National Bank of Delaware at Wilmington, with capital of $110,000. The charter was extended in 1885.

For 127 years, the bank served an account of the E.I. Du Pont de Nemours company.

In 1929, the bank merged with Security Trust Company (1885-1954). The bank was then the nation's fourth-oldest, after the Bank of North America (Philadelphia, 1784), Bank of Massachusetts (Boston, 1782), Bank of New York (New York, 1784), and Bank of Baltimore (Baltimore, 1795)).

=== Post-merger ===
In 1952, Security Trust Company merged with Equitable Trust Company, also of Wilmington, to become the Equitable Security Trust Company. In 1958, the company revived the name "Bank of Delaware".

In 1989, the bank's holding company, Bank of Delaware Corporation, was acquired by PNC Financial Corp. for $230 million in stock ($597,382,550 today). The Bank of Delaware held $1.8 billion in assets; PNC, then the nation's 12th-largest bank, held $36.6 billion.

== See also ==
- List of bank mergers in the United States
