= Symphony Place =

Office and retail building in Tennessee, United States

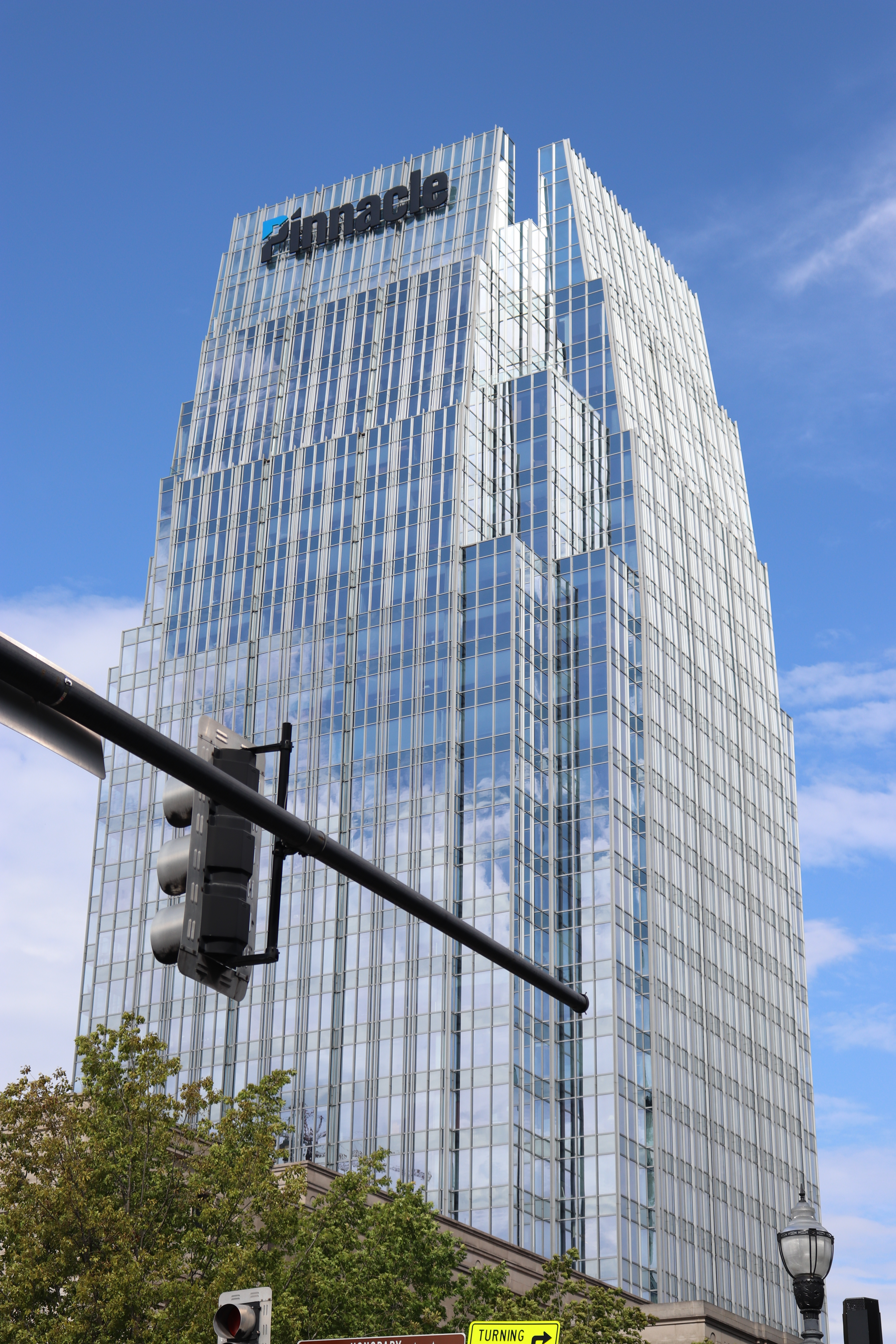
- October 2019 from Fourth Avenue South
- Interactive map of the Symphony Place area

General information
- Type: Office/retail
- Location: 150 Third Avenue South; Nashville, Tennessee; United States
- Coordinates: 36.1602°N 86.7747°W
- Construction started: July 2007
- Completed: 2009
- Opening: February 10, 2010
- Cost: US$170 million

Height
- Roof: 417 feet (127 m)

Technical details
- Floor count: 29
- Floor area: 519,994 square feet (48,309.0 m^{2})
- Lifts/elevators: 11

Design and construction
- Architects: Pickard Chilton, Everton Oglesby Architects
- Developer: Barry Real Estate
- Main contractor: Brasfield & Gorrie

Symphony Place is a 29-story, office and retail skyscraper located in Nashville, Tennessee, in the city's SoBro (South of Broadway) district. Located adjacent to the Schermerhorn Symphony Center, the building officially opened on February 10, 2010. The building includes 520,000 square feet (48,000 m^{2}) of Class A office space and 23,000 square feet (2,100 m^{2}) of retail space.

Symphony Place was home to Nashville-based Pinnacle Financial Partners, as well as several law firms. It is the first office tower in downtown Nashville to gain Gold LEED Certification due to its energy-efficient design. The building features a one-acre green roof terrace garden over the parking garage and other environmentally friendly amenities.

The tower was designed by Pickard Chilton of New Haven, Connecticut, and Everton Oglesby of Nashville. According to architect Jon Pickard, the tower's exterior design "takes its inspiration from the timeless design of classic skyscrapers."

On June 17, 2021, Pinnacle announced plans to move to a new headquarters building, and in 2025, their new headquarters opened in Nashville Yards. Since then, the sign on top of the existing building has been removed.

== See also ==
- List of tallest buildings in Nashville
