= Park Sterling Bank =

- Type: Public company
- Traded as: Previously Nasdaq: PSTB
- Industry: Financial services
- Founded: 2006
- Defunct: November 30, 2017
- Fate: Acquired by South State Bank
- Successor: South State Bank
- Headquarters: Charlotte, North Carolina, United States
- Area served: North Carolina, South Carolina, Virginia and Georgia
- Products: Banking services
- Parent: Park Sterling Corp.

Park Sterling Bank, was a bank based in Charlotte, North Carolina. It had $3.3 billion in assets and branches in North Carolina and South Carolina, Virginia and Georgia. The parent company was Park Sterling Corp. (Nasdaq: PSTB). A merger with South State Bank was completed November 30, 2017.

== History ==
=== Early history ===
Park Sterling Bank began with $45 million in capital in October 2006, one of several community banks in Charlotte, North Carolina. Bryan Kennedy, formerly of Regions Financial Corporation, was chairman. By April 2007 the bank announced plans to open a loan production office in Wilmington, North Carolina.

On August 2, 2010, Park Sterling announced federal approval for the bank's plan to buy troubled, but not failed, banks with $300 million to $2 billion in assets, and to open new branches. New CEO Jim Cherry, formerly of Wachovia, later said the bank planned to have assets of $8 to $10 billion, with branches in the Carolinas and Virginia. Also, Kennedy was staying on as president, and Bud Baker of Wachovia would be chairman. On August 13, the bank held its initial public offering, expected to raise $150 million. This would give the bank $600 million in assets, making it the second-largest bank based in Charlotte.

On March 31, 2011, Park Sterling Corp. announced its first acquisition, Community Capital Corp. of Greenwood, South Carolina, in a deal worth $32.4 million. Community Capital's 18 South Carolina branches, which would continue using the Capital Bank name, would give Park Sterling a total of 21 branches. Community Capital CEO Bill Stevens would become the CEO for South Carolina. The deal closed in the fourth quarter and gave the bank $1.2 billion in assets.

=== Citizens South ===
On May 14, 2012, Park Sterling Corp. announced it was buying Citizens South Banking Corp. of Gastonia, North Carolina, in a deal valued at $77.4 million. Citizens South began as Gastonia Mutual Building and Loan Association in 1904 and was "Gaston County's oldest community bank". Because of its policy of only lending locally, the bank was the only financial institution in Gaston County, North Carolina, to survive The Great Depression. President Kim Price joined the bank in 1997 in preparation for its transition from savings and loan to full-service bank. The bank went public in 1998 with the name Gaston Federal Bank. The parent company became Gaston Bancorp.

On July 16, 2001, the purchase of Salisbury, North Carolina–based CitizensBank was announced. The $38 million deal gave Gaston Bancorp $470 million in assets and added three branches for a total of nine. The new name Citizens South was announced in January 2002. Citizens South opened a $5.5 million 24,000 square feet (2,200 m^{2}) headquarters in June 2004, a "Georgian-style, white-columned brick building" which was nicknamed "Taj Ma-Hoyle" after board chairman David Hoyle.

In a deal completed October 31, 2005, Citizens South bought Trinity Bank, a community bank started in 1999 in Monroe, North Carolina, with three offices in Union County. The deal gave Citizens South $684 million in assets and made it the Charlotte area's eighth-largest bank.

In June 2007, Citizens South had 14 locations in North Carolina when it broke ground on its first full-service South Carolina office in Rock Hill, where it already had a loan production office. Citizens South also bought two failed north Georgia banks in deals made with the Federal Deposit Insurance Corporation. In 2010, taking over Bank of Hiawassee (which also operated as Bank of Blairsville and Bank of Blue Ridge) added $294 million in assets, for a total of $1.1 billion, and five branches for a total of 21 locations. On April 15, 2011, New Horizons Bank, with one location in East Elijay, failed and Citizens South took over.

The Citizens South deal gave Park Sterling $2.2 billion in assets, $1.7 billion in deposits, and 45 branches. An operations center would remain in Gastonia after the deal closed in October, and Citizens South CEO Kim Price would become Park Sterling vice chairman.

=== Other deals ===
On May 1, 2014, Park Sterling completed a $6.5 million deal with Provident Community Bank of Rock Hill, South Carolina.

On October 1, 2015, Park Sterling Corp. announced the purchase of First Capital Bancorp. of Glen Allen, Virginia, a deal valued at $82.5 million.

=== Acquisition by South State ===
On April 27, 2017, Park Sterling agreed to be acquired by South State Corp. of Columbia, South Carolina, the largest bank based in South Carolina, for $690.8 million. The deal was completed November 30, 2017 with signs changed in April 2018. South State added 43 branches, five in Georgia, 23 in South Carolina, 17 in North Carolina and eight in Virginia, for a total of 165. It has $14.5 billion in assets.
