= Berks County Trust Company building =

- Berks County Trust Company
- U.S. National Register of Historic Places
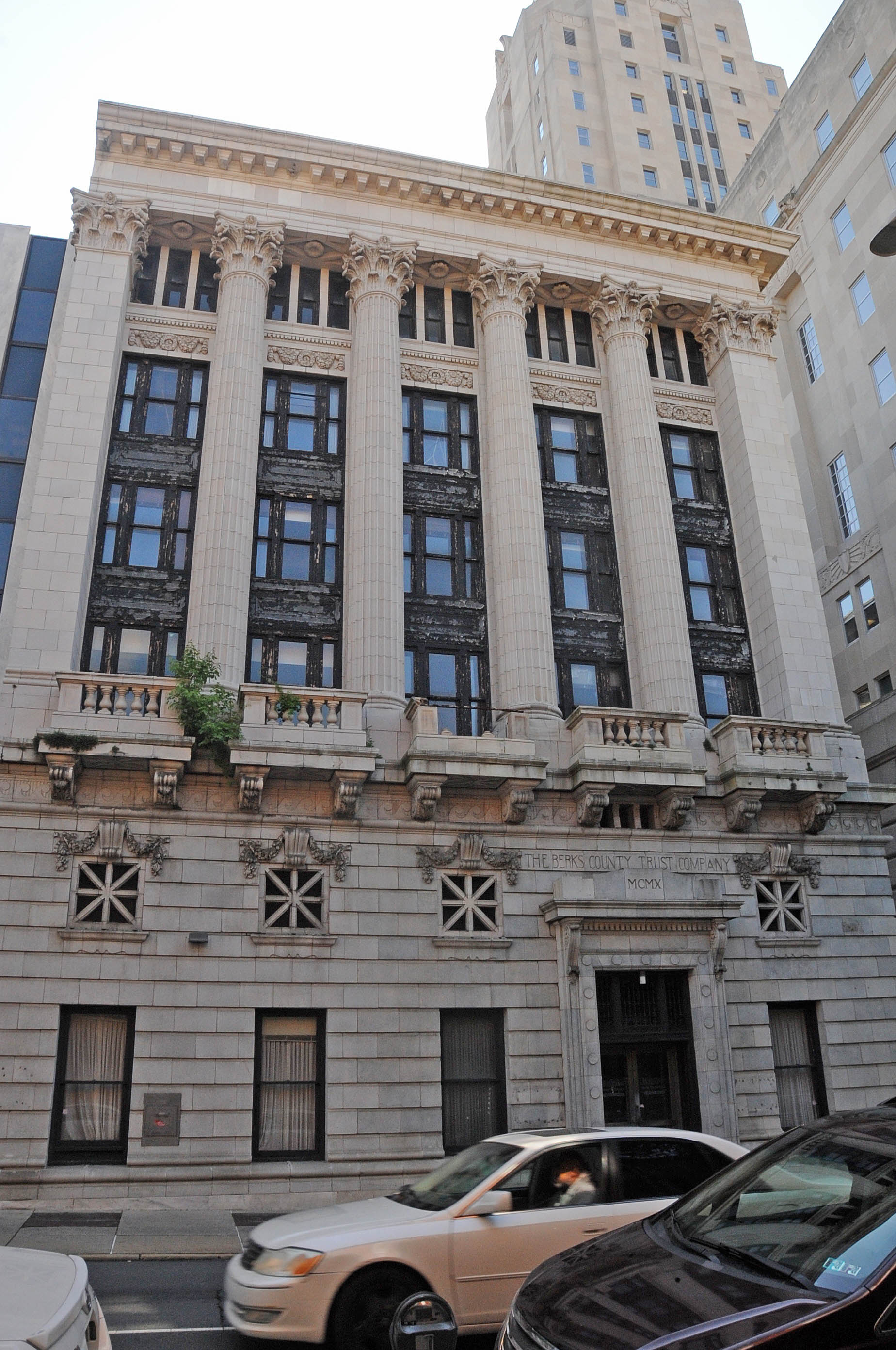
- The building in 2019
- Location: 35 N. 6th St. Reading, Pennsylvania 19601
- Coordinates: 40°20′11″N 75°55′33″W
- Built: 1909
- Architectural style: Neo-Classical
- NRHP reference No.: 100003455
- Added to NRHP: February 27, 2019

The Berks County Trust Company is a historic building in downtown Reading, Pennsylvania. Originally constructed in 1909, the six-story building was home to a bank known as the Berks County Trust Company and was the second largest bank branch in Berks County. The building still contains the original 1909 bank vault from the York Safe and Lock Company used by the building's eponymous bank. The building had additions built onto it in 1923, 1964 and 1984.

The building was later used to house the Meridian Bancorp Inc., which controlled 36 percent of the Berks County banking market and $11.8 billion in assets across the region at the start of the 1990s. However, leading into the turn of the century, the local economy of Reading began to decline and Meridian Bancorp began adding millions of dollars into its bad-debt reserves, in addition to selling its credit card, indirect auto-loan and title-insurance businesses. The building was vacated in the early 2010s, likely due to a greater amount of financial difficulties stemming from the Great Recession which greatly impacted the already economically declining city.

The building was purchased in 2018 by the Shuman Development Group with approval from the Reading City Council. The organization began a major renovation and restoration project that was overseen by the National Park Service. In 2021, the restoration project received a $250,000 tax credit allocation and $11,000,000 in estimated construction expenditures from the Pennsylvania Department of Community and Economic Development and the Pennsylvania Historical & Museum Commission. The restoration project seeks to convert the building into an office building with a food court in the main banking hall.

The building was listed on the National Register of Historic Places on February 27, 2019.
