= BNC Bank =

Defunct American bank

- Formerly: Bank of North Carolina (1991–2016)
- Type: Public
- Traded as: Nasdaq: BNCN
- Industry: Banking
- Founded: December 3, 1991; 34 years ago
- Defunct: June 1, 2017; 9 years ago (as an independent bank); September 25, 2017; 9 years ago (as a brand)
- Fate: Acquired by Pinnacle Financial Partners
- Successor: Pinnacle Bank
- Headquarters: Thomasville, North Carolina (1991–2007); High Point, North Carolina (2007–2017)
- Number of locations: 81 (2017)
- Areas served: North Carolina, South Carolina, Virginia
- Key people: Rick Callicutt (President & CEO); David Spencer (Executive Vice President & CFO)
- Products: commercial banking, trust services, financial planning
- Services: Finance, Investments, and Insurance
- Revenue: US$58.74 million (Q1 2017)
- Net income: US$14.43 million (Q1 2017)
- Total assets: US$7.57 billion (Q1 2017)
- Total equity: US$905.59 million (Q1 2017)
- Parent: BNC Bancorp (2002–2017); Pinnacle Financial Partners (2017)

BNC Bank was a bank based in High Point, North Carolina, United States. In 2014 its parent company BNC Bancorp (Nasdaq: BNCN) had $4.05 billion in assets, 38 branches in North Carolina and 13 in South Carolina. Its latest acquisition gave BNC $6.8 billion in assets and 87 branches, 48 in North Carolina, 29 in South Carolina nine in Virginia, and one in Haiti. Pinnacle Financial Partners of Nashville, Tennessee took over BNC Bancorp as of June 16, 2017 with BNC branches changing to Pinnacle on September 25, 2017.

== History ==
The bank opened in Thomasville, North Carolina on December 3, 1991 (as Bank of North Carolina) in a temporary location in a trailer, moving to its permanent home in Fall 1992.

On December 29, 2001, the Bank of North Carolina and Kernersville-based Independence Bank announced their merger. Bank of North Carolina had $211 million in assets and $171 million in deposits, and Independence Bank had assets of $59 million and deposits of $52 million.

On August 1, 2003, BNC Bancorp began trading on NASDAQ. At the time it had added branches in Archdale, Lexington and Oak Ridge.

After fifteen years of operation, BNC had expanded to 14 branches and $1 billion in assets, doubling its size in 30 months. It was the ninth community bank in the Piedmont Triad to reach that milestone. A 15,000-square foot administrative office was planned in High Point. Only one of the Harrisburg branches had opened. The move to High Point happened in 2007.

In May 2011, the U.S. Patent and Trademark Office approved a trademark for BNC Bank, after having used a BNC mark since 1995.

On September 7, 2012, BNC announced plans to move from its 10,000-square-foot Eastchester Drive headquarters to 22,500 square feet in Premier Center. The company planned to keep a portion of its existing space and move some operations from Thomasville.

During the first quarter of 2014 BNC opened branches in Raleigh, North Carolina and Greenville, South Carolina. This is in addition to buying 11 banks since 2010.

As Bank of North Carolina, BNC used the name BNC Bank in South Carolina and Virginia, and the bank had planned to change to BNC Bank everywhere. However, BNCCORP of North Dakota, which operated as BNC National Bank, protested this change. BNCCORP had filed for BNC Bank trademarks and sent BNC a warning letter in late 2014. BNC protested the trademark request, and BNCCORP sued BNC in September 2015 in federal court, at which time BNC countersued. The BNCCORP suit was dismissed in December 2015 with prejudice. In June 2016, a federal judge denied a restraining order and injunction by BNCCORP. On November 1, 2016, Bank of North Carolina rebranded to BNC Bank across their entire footprint. This included a new logo with a flying cardinal which represented "momentum, vision and growth".

On January 22, 2017, Nashville, Tennessee-based Pinnacle Financial Partners, parent company of Pinnacle Bank, announced it was acquiring BNC Bank. The deal completed June 16, 2017 gives Pinnacle operations in four states. At this time, the BNCCORP suit was dismissed without prejudice. BNC Bancorp changed its name to Pinnacle on September 25, 2017.

== Acquisitions ==
In a $36 million deal announced February 6, 2006, BNC Bancorp purchased SterlingSouth Bank & Trust of Greensboro, started in 2000, with assets of $148 million, two Greensboro branches and plans for a third. BNC had also opened a branch in High Point and a loan office in Winston-Salem. The deal would give BNC Bancorp ten branches and about $743 million in assets. In addition, BNC planned one branch in Welcome and two branches in Harrisburg outside Charlotte.

Other acquisitions included Regent Bank in Greenville, South Carolina, and KeySource Commercial Bank in Durham. BNC also bought two branches of The Bank of Hampton Roads in the Triangle.

On April 9, 2010, Myrtle Beach, South Carolina-based Beach First National Bank was the first South Carolina bank to fail in over ten years. It was started in 1996 and had seven branches in the Grand Strand area and in Hilton Head, and $585.1 million in assets and $516 million in deposits. On April 12, 2010, in a deal arranged by the FDIC, Beach First branches reopened as Bank of North Carolina, giving the bank its first operations in South Carolina.

Blue Ridge Savings Bank of Asheville, started in 1978, had 10 branches including one in South Carolina when it was closed October 14, 2011 by the state's commissioner of banks, with "essentially all" its $160.1 million in assets sold to BNC, which assumed $158.7 million in deposits. It was the fourth state-chartered bank to fail since 1991. In April 2012, BNC opened a Charlotte branch on Carmel Road. In a $35 million deal announced June 4, 2012, BNC Bancorp announced the purchase of First Trust Bank of Charlotte, adding three branches and $374 million in deposits for a total of $589 million in Charlotte-area deposits.

On June 8, 2012, BNC took over the failed Carolina Federal Savings Bank of Charleston, South Carolina.

On May 31, 2013, BNC announced a $10.4 million deal to buy Randolph Bank & Trust, an institution with $302 million in assets, three branches in Asheboro, and one branch each in Burlington, Mebane, and Randleman.

On December 18, 2013 BNC announced two deals. The $24.2 million purchase of Community First Financial Group, Inc., parent company of Harrington Bank of Chapel Hill, started in 1999, would add 3 branches and $228.5 million in assets. The $23.7 million purchase of South Street Financial Corp, doing business as Home Savings Bank, would add four locations in Albemarle and Stanly County, and $274.1 million in assets. The Albemarle bank was over 100 years old and would likely consolidate some branches. The deals would give BNC over $3.4 billion in assets and 40 branches. The South street purchase was completed April 1, and the Community First purchase was completed June 2, 2014.

On November 17, 2014 BNC announced its first acquisition in Virginia, Valley Financial Corporation of Roanoke, started in 1995. The $101.3 million deal, the bank's largest yet, would add nine branches in Roanoke and Salem, $857 million in assets (21 percent of BNC's assets before the deal), and $682 million in deposits. The deal was completed July 1, 2015.

On December 1, 2014 BNC announced the completion of a $50.6 million stock deal to buy Harbor Bank Group Inc. of Charleston, South Carolina, started in 2006. BNC would add $325 million in assets, $267 million in deposits and four branches, three in Charleston and one in Mount Pleasant, South Carolina, along with mortgage offices in Mount Pleasant, Greenville, South Carolina and Hilton Head Island. BNC would have the ninth-largest share of the Charleston market.

On August 14, 2015, BNC said it was buying Southcoast Financial Corp. of Mount Pleasant, South Carolina in a $95.5 million deal which would add $506 million in assets, putting the bank over $6 billion when the deal was completed, and giving BNC the number 5 ranking in the Charleston area.

On October 19, 2015, BNC completed its purchase of 7 CertusBank branches with $284 million in deposits, giving the bank 19 branches in South Carolina.

On November 1, 2016, BNC completed its largest deal ever, the $141.3 million purchase of High Point Bank & Trust, started in 1905, with $795 million in assets. Three branches were to close and move their operations to nearby locations.
