= NewAlliance Bank =

NewAlliance Bancshares
- Company type: Public (NYSE: NAL)
- Industry: Finance and Insurance
- Founded: New Haven Savings Bank (NHSB) 1838; Savings Bank of Manchester (SBM) 1895; Merger of NHSB, SBM & Tolland Bank 2004
- Defunct: April 15, 2011
- Successor: First Niagara Bank
- Headquarters: New Haven, Connecticut, United States
- Key people: Peyton R. Patterson, Chairman, & CEO; C. Gene Kirby, President; Glenn I. MacInnes, EVP and CFO
- Products: Banking
- Revenue: (▲$46.4M FY 2009)
- Website: www.newalliancebank.com

NewAlliance Bancshares, doing business as NewAlliance Bank, was the second largest Connecticut-based savings bank. It was formed in 2004 through the union of The Savings Bank of Manchester, New Haven Savings Bank, and Tolland Bank.

First Niagara Bank announced its acquisition of NewAlliance in August 2010.

== History ==
NewAlliance Bank has its roots dating back to 1838 when it was chartered with the formation of New Haven Savings Bank. It expanded as NewAlliance Bank in 2004 through the union of The Savings Bank of Manchester (Connecticut Bancshares, Inc.), New Haven Savings Bank and Tolland Bank (Alliance Bancorp of New England). NewAlliance Bank has seen consistent growth since its formation. Following are list of happenings:

- In July 2005, acquired Trust Company of Connecticut
- In January 2006, acquired Cornerstone Bank (Cornerstone Bancorp, Inc.)
- In January 2007, Westbank (Park West Bank & Trust Co.), a bank based in West Springfield, Massachusetts, became part of the company.
- In April 2011, New Alliance merged into First Niagara Bank. In 2016 Keybank acquired First Niagara

== Company ==
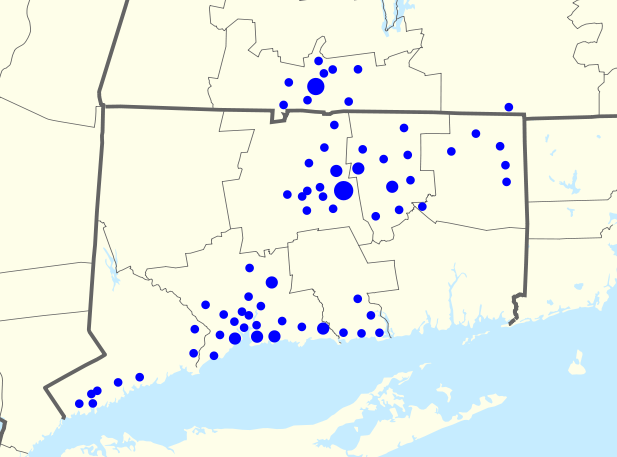
Map of NewAlliance branches.

- NewAlliance Bancshares, Inc. formed in 2003, listed on NYSE in 2004 under the symbol "NAL"
- Trust Company of Connecticut, a division of NewAlliance Bank, acquired by NewAlliance in July 2005, offers investment management, as well as trust and estate planning and has over $1.4 billion in assets under management, tripling the Bank's trust assets under management.
- NewAlliance Investments, Inc., member of Financial Industry Regulatory Authority (FINRA) and Securities Investor Protection Corporation (SIPC), a wholly owned subsidiary of NewAlliance Bancshares, Inc., offers investment and insurance products to individuals and businesses

=== Quick facts ===
Stats as of December 31, 2009:

- Total Deposits: $5.0 billion
- Total Assets: $8.4 billion
- Branches: 87
- ATMs: over 100
- Geographic Reach: Connecticut and Western Massachusetts
- Rank Among New England–based Banks: 4th largest
- Rank Among Connecticut-based Banks: 3rd largest
