= American National Bank of Texas =

Community bank in Texas (US state)

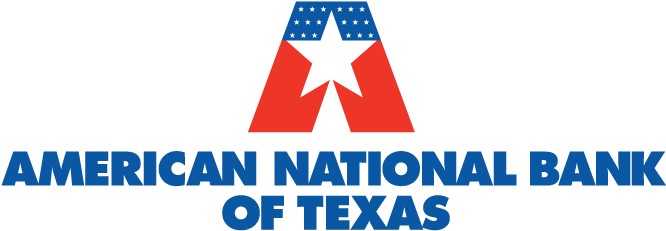
- Type: Private
- Industry: Banking; Financial Services
- Founded: 1875; 151 years ago
- Headquarters: Terrell, Texas, United States
- Area served: North Texas
- Key people: Robert A. Hulsey; (CEO); Chris Cronin; (President & COO)
- Products: Personal Banking; Mortgage Lending; Business Banking; Commercial Lending; Treasury Management; Wealth Management; Trust Services
- Website: www.anbtx.com/

American National Bank of Texas (ANBTX) is an independently owned community bank with 27 branches in North Texas, providing personal and business banking services. It also offers asset management, financial planning, investment services, and trust and estate services through ANBTX Wealth Management.

Founded in 1875, ANBTX reports over $5.5 billion in total assets as of June 30, 2026, ranking as the 9th largest bank based in North Texas and the 17th largest bank based in Texas overall. It is a member of the Federal Deposit Insurance Corporation (FDIC), and participates in the Deposit Insurance Fund (DIF).

Headquartered in Terrell, Texas, the bank has locations in Collin, Dallas, Hunt, Johnson, Kaufman, Rockwall, Tarrant, and Van Zandt counties. Robert A. Hulsey has been president and CEO of ANBTX since 1989.

== Charter ==
Formerly named American National Bank of Terrell, the bank’s current charter dates to July 1, 1981, as a commercial bank, with a federal charter supervised by the Office of the Comptroller of the Currency (OCC).

== History and predecessors ==
The predecessor of American National Bank of Texas—Waters, Bivens & Corley—was the first bank founded in Terrell, Texas on November 22, 1875. The bank’s building was destroyed by a fire in 1882, but bank records and securities were protected in the bank’s vault. The bank relocated to Moore Avenue in Terrell; today that location houses the Terrell banking center for ANBTX. After some early partners joined and left the bank, the bank merged with Harris Bank and renamed itself Harris National Bank in 1895. In 1903, the bank changed its name to the American National Bank of Terrell. In 1930, the American National Bank of Terrell merged with federally chartered local bank First National Bank. In 1995, American National Bank of Terrell changed its name to its current name, American National Bank of Texas.

== Major acquisitions ==
Independent Bank - East: In 1989, American National Bank of Texas acquired Independent Bank - East, located in Rockwall, Texas. Independent Bank-East had $36.9 million in total assets at the time of the acquisition.

First State Bank of Crandall: In 1990, American National Bank of Texas acquired First State Bank of Crandall, located in Crandall, Texas. First State Bank of Crandall had $16.1 million in total assets at the time of the acquisition.

First National Bank of Allen: In 1994, American National Bank of Texas acquired First National Bank of Allen, located in Allen, Texas. First National Bank of Allen had $40.9 million in total assets at the time of the acquisition.

The First National Bank of Wills Point: In 1998, American National Bank of Texas acquired The First National Bank of Wills Point, located in Wills Point, Texas. The First National Bank of Wills Point had $29.3 million in total assets at the time of the acquisition, and increased ANBTX total assets to more than $594.6 million.

The Bank of Van Zandt: In 1999, American National Bank of Texas acquired The Bank of Van Zandt, located in Canton, Texas. The Bank of Van Zandt had $66.5 million in total assets at the time of the acquisition, and increased ANBTX total assets to more than $734.6 million.

Benchmark Bank Branches: In 2002, American National Bank of Texas purchased six branch locations from Benchmark Bank in Greenville, Lone Oak, Quinlan, Royse City, and West Tawakoni, Texas.

Sleeper, Sewell & Company: In 2006, American National Bank of Texas acquired Dallas, Texas-based insurance agency, Sleeper, Sewell & Company. It was operated as a division of ANBTX Insurance Services, a wholly-owned subsidiary of ANBTX.

Citizens National Bank: In 2008, American National Bank of Texas acquired Citizens National Bank and its holding company, Bryant-Irvin Bancshares, located in Fort Worth, Texas. Citizens National Bank based had $139.6 million in total assets at the time of the acquisition, and increased ANBTX total assets to more than $1.7 billion.

Dallas National Bank: In 2008, American National Bank of Texas acquired Dallas National Bank and its holding company, DNB Bancshares, located in Dallas, Texas. Dallas National Bank had $98.1 million in total assets at the time of the acquisition.

First State Bank: In 2018, American National Bank of Texas acquired First State Bank and its holding company, G-6 Corporation, located in Mesquite, Texas. First State Bank had $195.8 million in total assets at the time of the acquisition, and increased ANBTX total assets to more than $3 billion.

== Media recognition ==
The Dallas Morning News named American National Bank of Texas to its annual “Top Workplaces” list in 2009 and again continuously from 2011 to 2026. ANBTX has achieved this significant recognition as a top employer in the Dallas-Fort Worth Metroplex 17 times overall. The newspaper conducts employee surveys, studies employee turnover rates and uses other statistical measures to compile its annual list.

In 2012, ANBTX was named as one of the “Top 10 Best Companies for Employee Financial Security” by Principal Financial Services. An independent panel from the employee benefits and human resources industries judged entries and selected the 10 companies for the award, working with the public opinion and market research firm of Mathew Greenwald & Associates.

== Timeline ==
- November 22, 1875: Began operating as Waters, Bivens & Corley in Terrell, TX
- 1878: Changed name to Holt, Bivens & Corley
- 1882: Changed name to Bivens & Corley
- January 3, 1887: Merged with The Harris Bank in Terrell, TX; changed name to The Harris Bank
- March 19, 1895: Changed name to The Harris National Bank
- January 13, 1903: Changed name to The American National Bank of Terrell
- 1913: Walter P. Allen named President
- 1926: Began offering trust and investment services
- February 24, 1930: Merged with The First National Bank of Terrell (TX)
- 1944: Bennett (Ben) L. Gill, Jr. named President
- 1967: Riter C. Hulsey named President
- March 13, 1989: Opened 2nd banking center, located in Forney, TX
- October 17, 1989: Robert A. Hulsey named President and CEO
- June 30, 1989: Acquired Independent Bank - East in Rockwall, TX
- April 19, 1990: Acquired First State Bank of Crandall (TX)
- July 8, 1991: Opened 6th banking center, located in Kaufman, TX
- September 19, 1994: Acquired First National Bank of Allen (TX)
- September 30, 1994: Surpassed $300 million in total assets
- January 4, 1995: Opened 8th banking center, located in Seagoville, TX
- February 1, 1995: Changed name to The American National Bank of Texas (ANBTX)
- May 16, 1996: Opened 9th banking center, located in Rowlett, TX
- June 30, 1996: Surpassed $400 million in total assets
- January 24, 1997: Purchased two branches from Bank of America in Greenville and Wills Point, TX
- March 31, 1997: Surpassed $500 million in total assets
- January 1, 1998: Acquired The First National Bank of Wills Point (TX)
- March 31, 1998: Surpassed $600 million in total assets
- June 1, 1999: Acquired The Bank of Van Zandt in Canton, TX
- June 30, 1999: Surpassed $700 million in total assets
- 2000: Launched anbtx.com
- March 5, 2001: Opened 14th banking center, located in Plano, TX
- September 30, 2001: Surpassed $800 million in total assets
- December 31, 2001: Surpassed $900 million in total assets
- January 18, 2002: Purchased two branches from Jefferson Heritage Bank in Rockwall and Rowlett, TX
- May 28, 2002: Purchased six branches from Benchmark Bank in Greenville, Lone Oak, Quinlan, Royse City, and West Tawakoni, TX
- September 30, 2002: Surpassed $1 billion in total assets
- December 15, 2004: Opened 18th banking center, located in Sachse, TX
- February 2, 2005: Opened 19th banking center, located in McKinney, TX
- October 17, 2005: Opened 20th banking center, located in Dallas, TX
- January 4, 2006: ANBTX Insurance, a wholly-owned subsidiary, acquired Sleeper, Sewell & Company
- August 7, 2006: Opened 21st banking center, located in Burleson, TX
- February 22, 2008: Acquired Citizens National Bank in Fort Worth, TX
- June 6, 2008: Acquired Dallas National Bank in Dallas, TX
- December 31, 2008: Surpassed $2 billion in total assets
- 2009, 2011–2026: Named "Top Workplaces" by The Dallas Morning News
- May 28, 2013: Opened 26th banking center, located in Hurst, TX
- November 12, 2013: Sleeper Sewell Insurance Services, a division of ANBTX Insurance Services, acquired Planned Benefits Services
- November 6, 2017: Opened loan production office, located in Frisco, TX
- September 7, 2018: Acquired First State Bank in Mesquite, TX
- September 30, 2018: Surpassed $3 billion in total assets
- November 6, 2018: Divested ANBTX Insurance Services, a wholly-owned subsidiary, to DMS Insurance Holdings
- September 30, 2020: Surpassed $4 billion in total assets
- December 31, 2021: Surpassed $5 billion in total assets
- December 31, 2023: Surpassed $6 billion in total assets
- December 10, 2024: Opened 2nd loan production office, located in South Dallas
- 2025: Celebrated 150th anniversary
- December 1, 2025: Opened 28th banking center, located in Heath, TX
- December 4, 2025: Opened wealth management office, located in Richardson, TX
- December 18, 2025: Chris Cronin named President

== Locations ==
As of June 2026, American National Bank of Texas reported having offices in the following North Texas locations:

- Allen, Texas
- Burleson, Texas
- Canton, Texas
- Crandall, Texas
- Dallas, Texas
- Forney, Texas
- Fort Worth, Texas
- Frisco, Texas
- Greenville, Texas
- Heath, Texas
- Hurst, Texas
- Kaufman, Texas
- Mansfield, Texas
- McKinney, Texas
- Mesquite, Texas
- Plano, Texas
- Quinlan, Texas
- Richardson, Texas
- Rockwall, Texas
- Rowlett, Texas
- Royse City, Texas
- Sachse, Texas
- Seagoville, Texas
- Terrell, Texas
- Wills Point, Texas
- Wylie, Texas
