= RBC Bank =

Former bank in the southeastern United States

RBC Bank (Georgia), N.A.
- Trade name: RBC Bank
- Company type: Subsidiary
- Industry: Bank (federally chartered)
- Founded: March 5, 2012; 14 years ago
- Area served: United States
- Parent: Royal Bank of Canada
- Website: www.rbcbank.com

RBC Bank is the trading name of RBC Bank (Georgia), N.A., the United States–based retail banking division of the Royal Bank of Canada (RBC) which is targeted toward Canadian snowbirds, expatriates, and frequent tourists. Despite its limited reach, RBC Bank is a federally chartered bank, thus its trading name bears "N.A." letters.

The brand name was originally used by RBC Bank USA (formerly RBC Centura), formed in 2001 when RBC acquired the Rocky Mount, North Carolina–based Centura Bank. In 2012, RBC Bank USA's banking division for American clients was sold to PNC Financial Services while RBC's cross-border banking services for Canadians were transferred to the newly incorporated RBC Bank (Georgia), N.A. subsidiary. RBC then acquired Los Angeles–based City National Bank in 2015 to serve American clients.

== 2001-2012: RBC Bank USA ==
RBC Bank USA
- Formerly: RBC Centura (2001-2008)
- Company type: Subsidiary
- Industry: Bank
- Predecessor: Centura Bank
- Founded: June 5, 2001 as RBC Centura
- Defunct: March 5, 2012; 14 years ago
- Fate: US customer division sold to PNC Financial Services
- Headquarters: RBC Plaza, Raleigh, North Carolina, United States
- Area served: Southeastern United States
- Services: Retail banking
- Parent: Royal Bank of Canada
- Website: Archived RBC Bank USA website

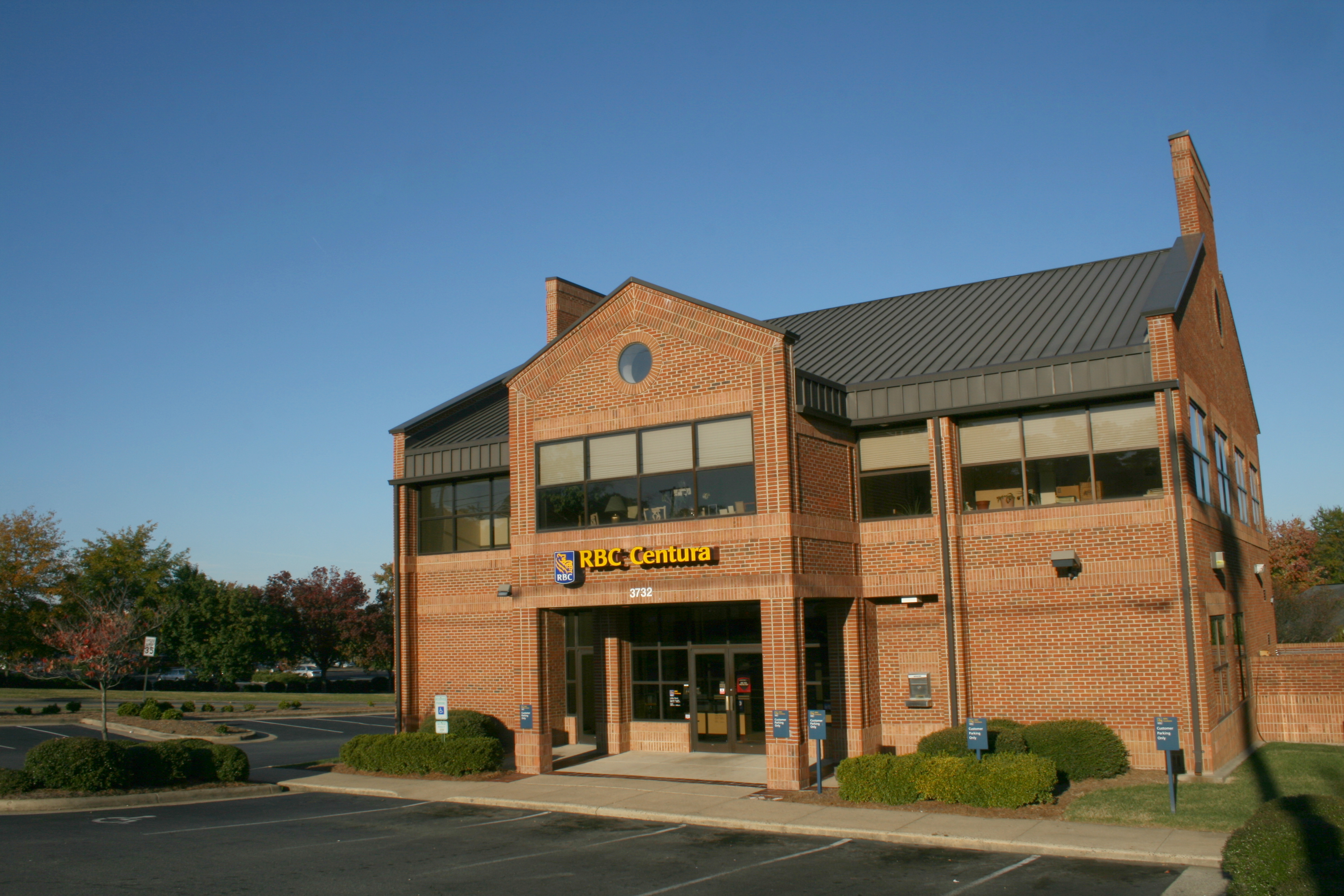
An RBC Centura branch in Durham, North Carolina (2008).

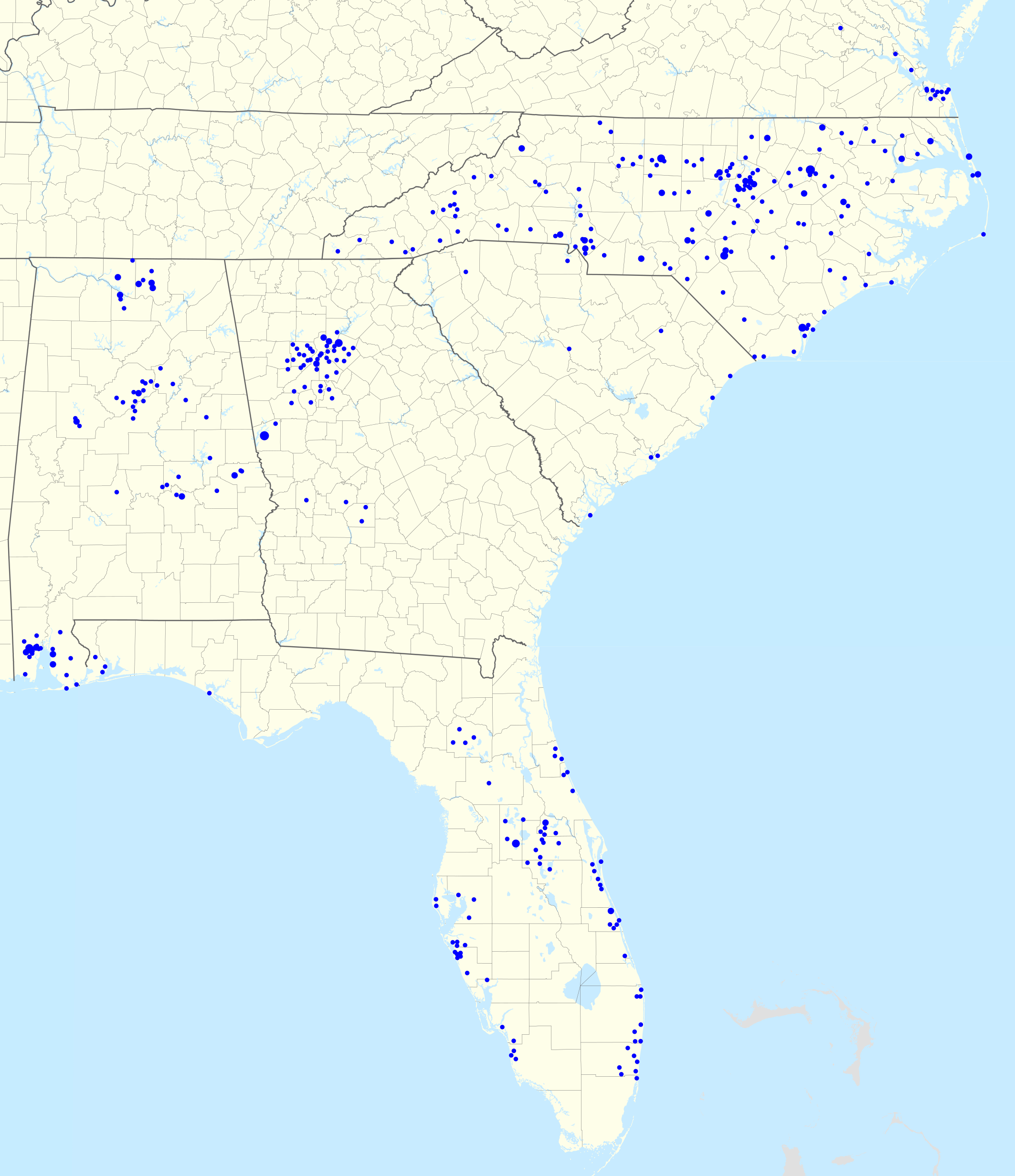
Locations of RBC Bank USA branches in July 2011

On November 2, 1990, Peoples Bancorp and Planters Corp., of Rocky Mount, North Carolina, merged to form Centura Bank. In June 2001, Royal Bank of Canada acquired Centura Banks and rebranded them as RBC Centura. RBC announced on January 17, 2008, that it would abandon the "Centura" brand in April 2008 and the unit would operate as RBC Bank. Over 1000 employees continued to work in Rocky Mount as of 2011, in such areas as information technology and mortgage processing.

=== Acquisitions ===
RBC Centura purchased Tucker Federal Bank parent company Eagle Bancshares in 2002, giving it a more substantial customer base in the Atlanta area after its 1998 purchase of Security First Network Bank which had only one office. The bank merged with Flag Bank, increasing its presence in Georgia. RBC continued to grow in the Southeast after acquiring 39 branches of Birmingham, Alabama-based AmSouth Bank on March 9, 2007. Previously, RBC Centura had no locations in Alabama.

RBC's footprint in Alabama, Georgia, and Florida expanded significantly after its acquisition of Alabama National BanCorporation (ANB). RBC received U.S. approval February 5, 2008, and on April 14, 51 branches re-opened as RBC Bank. The remaining branches re-opened by June 2008. ANB operated in three states through eleven different subsidiaries.

=== RBC presence in Raleigh, NC ===
Construction of the RBC Plaza, now PNC Plaza, in 2008, was not the first major move by RBC to become a major part of the community in Raleigh, NC. In 2002, RBC purchased the naming rights for the Raleigh Entertainment & Sports Arena, home to the Carolina Hurricanes of the National Hockey League and North Carolina State University basketball. The arena became the RBC Center, with a 20-year lease at a cost of $80 million. In June 2006, the RBC Center hosted the NHL's Stanley Cup Finals, and on June 19, 2006, the Carolina Hurricanes defeated the Edmonton Oilers in the arena to win the Stanley Cup.

PNC acquired the naming rights with the purchase of RBC, and the name changed to PNC Arena on March 15, 2012.

At the time PNC acquired RBC, it had a total of 5,000 employees with 500 located in the Raleigh area.

=== Dunmore Homes controversy ===
In November 2007, RBC Centura was involved in the "Dunmore Homes" project in Sacramento, California, that stopped all construction on August 8, 2007, due to liquidity issues with the home builder. The company was subsequently sold to a mortgage loan officer for $500 and quickly incorporated in New York. The company filed for bankruptcy in Manhattan. After details of the sale became known to RBC Centura Bank, a major Dunmore Homes creditor, the bank sued on November 7. The company alleged in a lawsuit filed in Fresno County that the sale of all the assets for a mere $500 was not adequate and was done to "hinder, delay and defraud the creditors," including RBC.

RBC financed four Dunmore projects from Bakersfield to Yuba City. It loaned Dunmore Homes a total of $105 million and, according to an affidavit by a Dunmore Homes official, is still owed $39 million. As collateral, it has secured claims against those projects. But the company says the value of a Fresno project is less than the outstanding loan balance. Nine major lenders, including RBC, are owed a combined total of $196 million on Dunmore Homes' 26 new-home communities, according to the builder.

=== Sale to PNC ===
On June 19, 2011, PNC Financial Services agreed to buy RBC Bank USA from Royal Bank of Canada for $3.45 billion. The sale of RBC Bank closed in March 2012. Upon acquisition, all RBC Bank branches were rebranded as PNC branches and the RBC Bank brand became dormant for US customers.

RBC Insurance, RBC Wealth Management and RBC Investing remained subsidiaries of RBC.

RBC later returned to offering retail banking services to American customers with its acquisition of Los Angeles–based City National Bank in 2015.
