= Fidelity Trust Company =

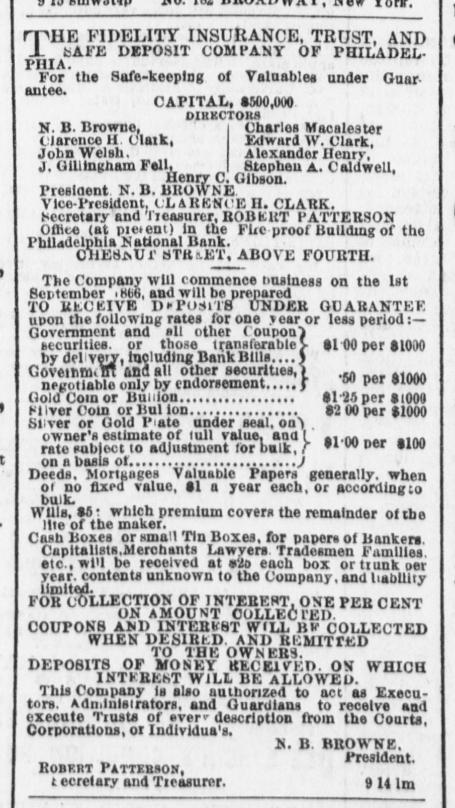
An 1866 advertisement for the Fidelity Insurance, Trust, & Safe Deposit Company in the Evening Telegraph, a Philadelphia newspaper.

Fidelity Trust Company was a bank in Philadelphia, Pennsylvania. Founded in 1866 as Fidelity Insurance, Trust, & Safe Deposit Company, the bank was later renamed Fidelity Trust Company, Fidelity-Philadelphia Trust Company, The Fidelity Bank, and Fidelity Bank, National Association. It was absorbed in 1988 in the biggest U.S. bank merger up to that point, and is today part of Wells Fargo.

== History ==
It was founded in 1866 by financier Clarence H. Clark (1833–1906) and several partners as the Fidelity Insurance, Trust, & Safe Deposit Company with initial capital of $250,000. Besides selling insurance and transacting trust business, the company was the second U.S. bank to offer safe deposit services. The bank was located at Broad and Walnut Streets in Philadelphia. The Chestnut Street building was designed by G. W. & W. D. Hewitt - Architects, Frederick S. Holmes - Vault Engineer, and Damon Safe & Iron Works Co. - Vault Builder.

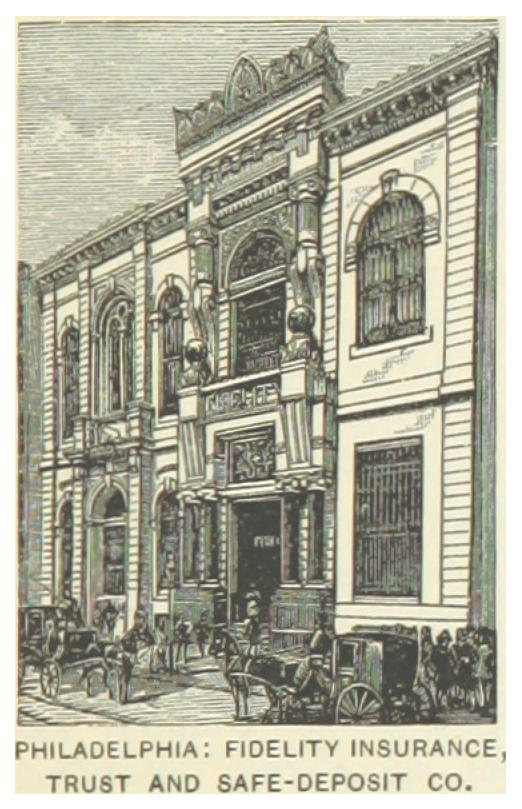
1891 drawing of the company's building on Chestnut Street

Clark served as the bank's first president, followed by Nathaniel B. Browne, Stephen Caldwell, John B. Gest (1824–1907), Rudolph Ellis (1837-1915, served as FTC president 1900–1915), and William P. Gest (1861-1939, served 1919(?)–1926).

Renamed the Fidelity Trust Company in 1886, it had by 1921 achieved "a foremost place among the trust companies of the country." It was reported to hold more than $255 million in trust funds and $829 million in corporate trusts.

In the early years of the 20th century, Fidelity underwrote International Mercantile Marine, the parent company of the White Star Line. The 1912 sinking of RMS Titanic caused large losses at Fidelity and forced layoffs. One of the Titanic survivors, Thomas D.M. Cardeza, was a grandson of Fidelity co-founder Thomas Drake and would go on to be a director of the company from 1922 to 1951.

In 1926, the bank merged with the Philadelphia Trust Company, established in 1869, to become the Fidelity-Philadelphia Trust Company.

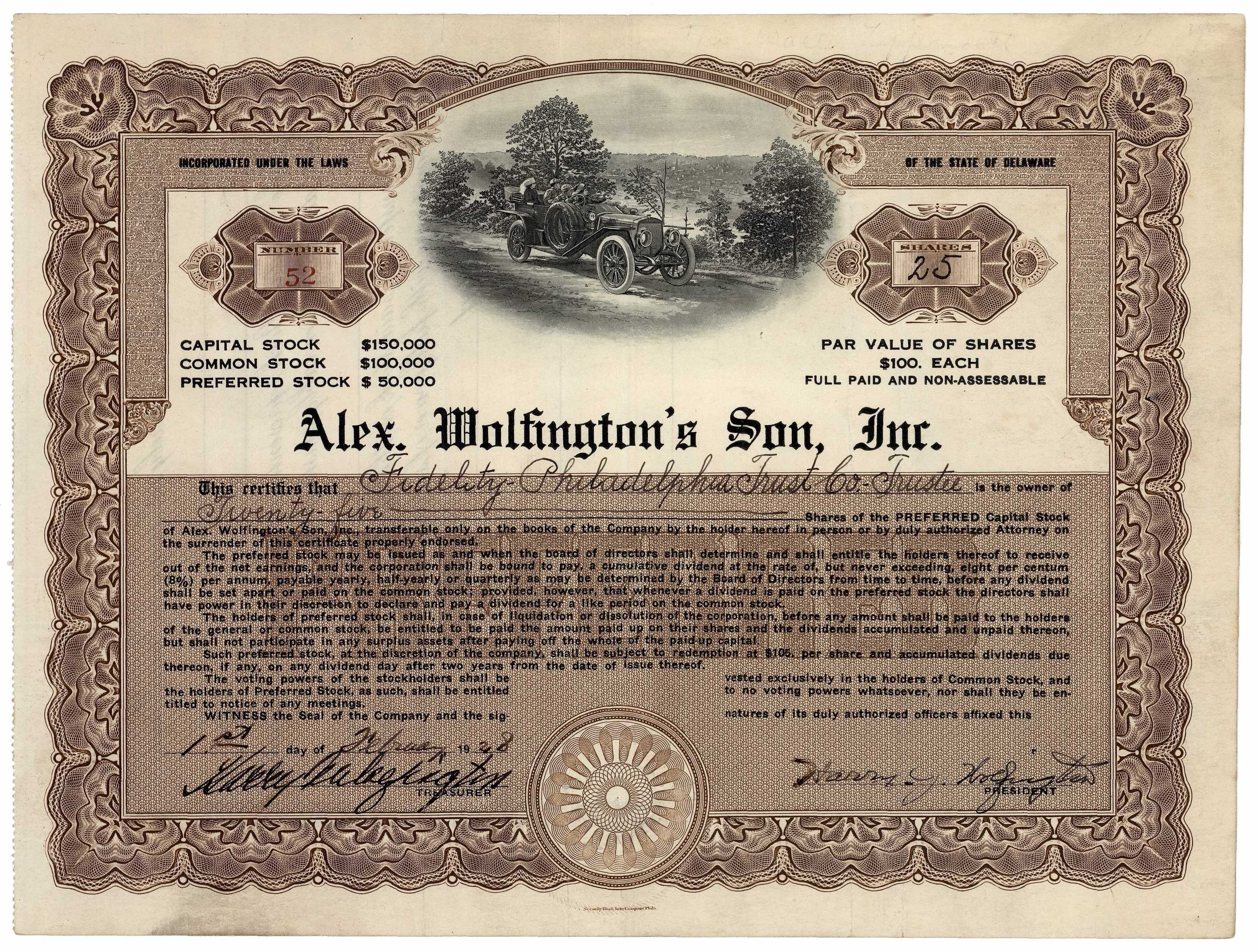
1928 was the Fidelity-Philadelphia Trust Company the trustee of shares from the Alex. Wolfington's Son, Inc.

In 1928, the bank erected a 29-story headquarters building at 123-151 South Broad Street in Philadelphia. Called the Fidelity-Philadelphia Trust Company Building, it is today listed on the National Register of Historic Places. This building portrayed the headquarters of Duke & Duke in the film Trading Places.

From 1950 to 1966, the bank's president was Howard C. Petersen (1911-1996), who went on to be its CEO until 1975 and chairman until 1978.

In 1956, the bank acquired Farmers National Bank of Bucks County and Roosevelt Bank

In April 1967, the bank was renamed The Fidelity Bank. In 1970, the bank's headquarters moved to 1200 East Lancaster Avenue in Rosemont, Pennsylvania.

From 1971 to 1978, the bank's president was Samuel H. Ballam Jr. (1919-2003), a 42-year employee of the bank.

In 1984, the bank was renamed Fidelity Bank, National Association and its headquarters moved to 2 County View Road in Rosemont. In 1985, the headquarters moved to 14 Great Valley Parkway in Malvern, Pennsylvania, and in 1990, back to the original location at Broad and Walnut Streets in Philadelphia.

In the 1970s, the company established a holding company named Fidelcor to operate Fidelity Bank as its main subsidiary.

== Post-independence ==
In 1988, Fidelcor was merged into First Fidelity, a growing New Jersey bank. The $1.34 billion deal, the largest bank merger up to that time, turned First Fidelity into a regional powerhouse and one of the nation's 25 largest banks.

In 1996, First Fidelity was absorbed into First Union, which in 2001 merged with Wachovia, which was acquired by Wells Fargo in 2008.

== See also ==
- List of bank mergers in the United States
