= Atlantic Union Bank =

American financial institution

Atlantic Union Bankshares Corporation
- The bank's logo
- Formerly: Union Bank and Trust Company (1902–2010); First Market Bank (1997–2010); Union First Market Bank (2010–2015); Union Bank & Trust (2015–2019)
- Type: Public company
- Traded as: NYSE: AUB
- Industry: Financial services
- Predecessors: Union Bank and Trust Company; First Market Bank, FSB
- Founded: 1902; 124 years ago (as Union Bank And Trust Company); November 4, 1997; 28 years ago (as First Market Bank); March 20, 2010; 16 years ago (as Union First Market Bank)
- Headquarters: Bowling Green, Virginia (1902–2010); Richmond, Virginia (1997–Present),
- Number of locations: 190 branches (2026)
- Areas served: Virginia; Maryland; North Carolina
- Key people: Ronald L. Tillett (chairperson); John C. Asbury (CEO); Maria Tedesco (President and COO)
- Products: Checking accounts, saving accounts, credit cards, loans
- Revenue: ▲US$1.345 billion (2024)
- Net income: ▲US$2.89 billion (2024)
- Total assets: ▲US$24.585 billion (2024)
- Total equity: ▲US$3.142 billion (2024)
- Number of employees: 2,125 (2024)
- Website: www.atlanticunionbank.com

Atlantic Union Bankshares Corporation is a bank holding company based in Richmond, Virginia and is the parent company of Atlantic Union Bank, a regional bank. It operates 190 branches in Virginia, Maryland, and North Carolina and is the largest bank headquartered in Virginia. It is on the list of largest banks in the United States.

It offers loans for automobiles, commercial real estate, construction, and housing as well as equipment financing and insurance products.

== History ==
The company traces it roots to Union Bank and Trust Company, founded in 1902 in Bowling Green, Virginia. In February 2010, the company merged with First Market Bank, FSB, and changed its name to Union First Market Bank (UFMB).

In June 2010, the company merged two affiliate banks, Northern Neck State and Rappahannock National, into UFMB.

UFMB acquired StellarOne Bank in 2014.

In 2015, UFMB rebranded to Union Bank & Trust (UB&T).

In December 2017, the bank acquired Xenith Bank.

In February 2019, the bank acquired Access National Corporation and its subsidiary, Middleburg Bank.

In May 2019, UB&T rebranded to Atlantic Union Bank to reflect geographic expansion.

In October 2019, the bank created a division focused on financing for commercial equipment.

In June 2022, the company sold its registered investment adviser subsidiary.

In January 2023, the company transferred its stock listing from the Nasdaq to the New York Stock Exchange.

In April 2024, the company acquired American National Bankshares Inc., based in Danville, which owned American National Bank and Trust Co. The acquisition expanded Atlantic Union Bank into Virginia's Southside, New River Valley, and the Roanoke metropolitan area, as well as North Carolina, particularly in the Piedmont Triad metropolitan region and Raleigh.

In April 2025, the company acquired Sandy Spring Bank.

In June 2025, the company sold $2 billion of commercial real estate loans to an affiliate of The Blackstone Group for low 90s as a percentage of par value.

== Naming rights and sponsorships ==
Atlantic Union Bank has naming rights for the Atlantic Union Bank Center, a multi-purpose arena on the James Madison University campus in Harrisonburg, Virginia as part of a ten-year name sponsorship agreement worth $2.25 million.

The bank also has naming rights for the Atlantic Union Bank Pavilion in Portsmouth.

The bank has sponsored Drumstick Dash, a 5K run in Roanoke. as well as the 10K Mini run for children in Richmond.

== Philanthropy ==
In December 2019, the bank donated a building acquired in the 1990s to the town of Bowling Green.

In May 2022, following the Russian invasion of Ukraine, the bank co-organized a fundraiser in support of Ukraine.

In 2023, the bank funded grants allowing community groups and non-profit organizations to hire summer interns.

== Controversy ==
In December 2023, the Consumer Financial Protection Bureau ordered Atlantic Union Bank to pay a total of $6.2 million for misleading and illegally enrolling thousands of customers in its checking account overdraft program by phone in violation of the Electronic Fund Transfer Act.
