= Straus National Bank and Trust Company =

Straus National Bank and Trust Company may refer to one of two former bank organizations:

- Straus National Bank and Trust Company (Chicago)
- Straus National Bank and Trust Company (New York)
