= Sandy Spring Bank =

Former American financial holding company

Sandy Spring Bancorp, Inc.
- Industry: Banking
- Founded: 1868; 158 years ago
- Defunct: April 1, 2025; 18 months ago
- Fate: Acquired by Atlantic Union Bank
- Headquarters: Olney, Maryland, U.S.
- Area served: Washington metropolitan area
- Key people: Daniel J. Schrider (president and CEO)
- Products: Financial services

Sandy Spring Bancorp, Inc. was a bank holding company headquartered in Olney, Maryland and operating in the Washington metropolitan area. In addition to banking services, the company offered commercial and personal lines of insurance, surety bonds, workers compensation insurance, and professional liability insurance protection as well as financial planning, wealth management, and asset management for high-net-worth individuals, businesses, and associations. In April 2025, the company was acquired by Atlantic Union Bank.

== History ==
In 1868, farmers who were Quakers founded Sandy Spring Bank to pool their savings to make home loans to their neighbors.

In December 1993, the bank acquired First Montgomery Bank.

In August 1996, the bank acquired Annapolis Bancshares for $17 million.

In December 2001, the company acquired Chesapeake Insurance Group of Annapolis and renamed it Sandy Spring Insurance Corp.

In February 2007, the bank acquired Potomac Bank of Virginia for $64.7 million.

In June 2007, the bank acquired County National Bank of Glen Burnie for $44.1 million.

During the 2008 financial crisis, the company received an investment of $82 million from the Troubled Asset Relief Program. The investment was repaid in December 2010, making Sandy Spring one of the first community banks in the Washington metropolitan area to repay its TARP investment.

In January 2009, Daniel J. Schrider was promoted to chief executive officer, succeeding Hunter R. Hollar. Schrider joined the company as a lender in 1989.

In May 2012, the bank acquired CommerceFirst Bank of Annapolis for $25.4 million.

In February 2016, the bank opened its first branch in the District of Columbia.

In August 2016, Sandy Spring Insurance acquired The Advantage Group.

In January 2018, the bank acquired WashingtonFirst Bankshares for $489 million, creating the largest community bank headquartered in the Washington metropolitan area.

In April 2020, the bank acquired Revere Bank of Maryland for $293 million.

In April 2025 Atlantic Union Bank acquired the company.
