= Centura Bank =

Former American bank

- Industry: Financial services
- Predecessors: Peoples Bancorp; Planters Bank
- Founded: 1990
- Defunct: 2001
- Fate: Acquired by Royal Bank of Canada
- Successor: RBC Centura (now PNC Financial Services)
- Headquarters: Rocky Mount, North Carolina, United States
- Area served: North Carolina and South Carolina
- Key people: Kel Landis, Frank Jolley
- Products: Banking services

Centura Bank was an American bank headquartered in Rocky Mount, North Carolina. It existed from 1990, when Peoples Bancorp and Planters Bank merged, to 2001, when the Royal Bank of Canada acquired the company and changed its name to RBC Centura.

== History ==
=== Peoples Bank ===
In 1918, the 22,000-square foot, five-story headquarters of Rocky Mount National Bank, the historic district's tallest building, was built in Rocky Mount. Frank Pierce Milburn was the architect. In 1934, the bank changed its name to People's Bank and Trust. The People's Building served as the bank's headquarters until the mid-1970s. It remained empty after the bank left until Selp-Help Ventures Fund bought the building in 2000 to convert to office space.

Robert L. Mauldin became chairman of Peoples Bancorp in 1984. When he first went to work for Peoples in 1969, it had 22 branches and $100 million.

Peoples Bancorp had $1.26 billion in assets when the bank announced its merger in 1990.

=== Planters Bank ===
Planters Bank started in 1899.

Archie W. McLean served as the president and chief executive of Planters from 1950 until 1971, when he became chairman. When he retired in 1974, Planters was the state's tenth largest bank.

In 1985, Planters had assets of $620 million and 52 locations in 19 communities in the eastern part of the state when it announced the $10.1 million acquisition of Bank of Pilot Mountain, with $50.9 million in assets and two locations.

In 1990, Planters had $1.17 billion in assets.

=== Centura Bank ===
A "merger of equals" created Centura Banks. Inc. in 1990. The name Centura came from Glenn Monigle & Associates Inc. of Denver, Colorado. When the two banks' chiefs, Dick Futrell of Planters and Mauldin of Peoples, announced the deal January 16, 1990, they said in a statement, "This is probably the most logical bank merger in North Carolina history." The merged banking company had $2.6 billion in assets and 116 branches and was the state's seventh-largest. Centura Bank had 102 branches; the holding company also owned Watauga Savings and Loan Association, Inc. in Boone, North Carolina and Mid-South Bank and Trust Company in Sanford, North Carolina. Over 700 employees worked in Rocky Mount. However, the two banks had very different cultures and the combination did not come easily. Planters was "old money" with "top down" decision making, while Peoples was "the town's common folk". Though Futrell led Centura, the merged bank had the Peoples culture. Completing the merger required some the sale of some branches. Unity Bank and Trust, started in 1989, bought eleven branches, giving the bank a total of twelve, and assets of $133 million.

In 1990, Centura had $178 million in market capitalization. This increased to $1.1 billion by 1997 when Mauldin retired. The bank had $6.3 billion in assets.

Futrell remained on the board of directors, and Mauldin became Centura chairman in 1993. Cecil Sewell Jr., Peoples Bancorp president starting in 1989 and later Centura's president, succeeded Mauldin as chairman in 1997. Centura used the former Planters headquarters, while the Poyner & Spruill law firm took over the 25-year-old 42,000-square-foot former Peoples building in 1991.

In 1991, Centura took over Watauga Savings, and Citizens Federal Savings and Loan in Rutherfordton, North Carolina. In 1992, Centura took over First Federal Savings Association in Raleigh, North Carolina. In 1993, Centura took over Orange Federal Savings Bank in Chapel Hill, North Carolina; Brevard Federal Savings and Loan Association in Brevard, North Carolina; Granite Savings Bank in Granite Falls, North Carolina; First American Federal Savings Bank in Greensboro, North Carolina; First Savings Bank in Forest City, North Carolina; First Charlotte Bank in Charlotte, North Carolina; Canton Savings Bank in Canton, North Carolina and Robeson Savings Bank in Lumberton, North Carolina.

In 1994, Centura took over Sewell's former home of Mid-South Bank.

In 1995, Centura took over Cleveland Federal Bank in Shelby, North Carolina and First Southern Savings Bank in Asheboro, North Carolina and First Commercial Bank in Asheville, North Carolina. In 1996 Centura took over First Community Bank in Gastonia, North Carolina and First South Bank in Burlington, North Carolina.

In 1998, Centura entered South Carolina for the first time by taking over Pee Dee State Bank in Timmonsville, South Carolina.

In 1999, Centura took over Scotland Savings Bank in Laurinburg, North Carolina. Also, already In Virginia, Centura added First Coastal Bank in Virginia Beach.

In 2000, Centura took over Triangle Bancorp in Raleigh and Bank of Mecklenburg in Charlotte.

On January 26, 2001, Canada's largest bank, Royal Bank of Canada, announced a $2.3 billion deal to acquire Centura, which had $11.5 billion in assets and 246 branches. The bank's name would change to RBC Centura, and the headquarters would remain in Rocky Mount. On February 24, 2012, PNC bought out RBC Centura bank.
