= Nathaniel B. Browne =

American lawyer

Nathaniel Borradaile Browne (1819-1875) was an American lawyer, financier, and government official in Philadelphia, Pennsylvania.

Born in Philadelphia, he helped found the Fidelity Trust Company in 1866 and worked on the 1876 Centennial Exposition in Fairmount Park. He represented a Philadelphia district in the Pennsylvania state legislature and was appointed Postmaster of Philadelphia on March 30, 1859.

His papers are today preserved at the University of Delaware in Newark, Delaware.
