= SouthState Bank =

American bank

SouthState Corporation
- Company type: Public
- Traded as: Nasdaq: SSB; S&P 400 component
- Industry: Banking
- Founded: June 30, 2000; 25 years ago as CenterState Bank
- Headquarters: Winter Haven, Florida, U.S.
- Number of locations: 371 branches
- Area served: South Carolina; North Carolina; Georgia; Alabama; Virginia; Florida; Colorado; Texas
- Key people: Robert R. Horger (chairman); John Corbett (CEO); Will Matthews (CFO)
- Services: Financial services
- Net income: ▲US$534.8 million (2024)
- Total assets: ▲US$46.4 billion (2024)
- Total equity: ▲US$5.9 billion (2024)
- Number of employees: 5,100 (2024)
- Website: southstatebank.com

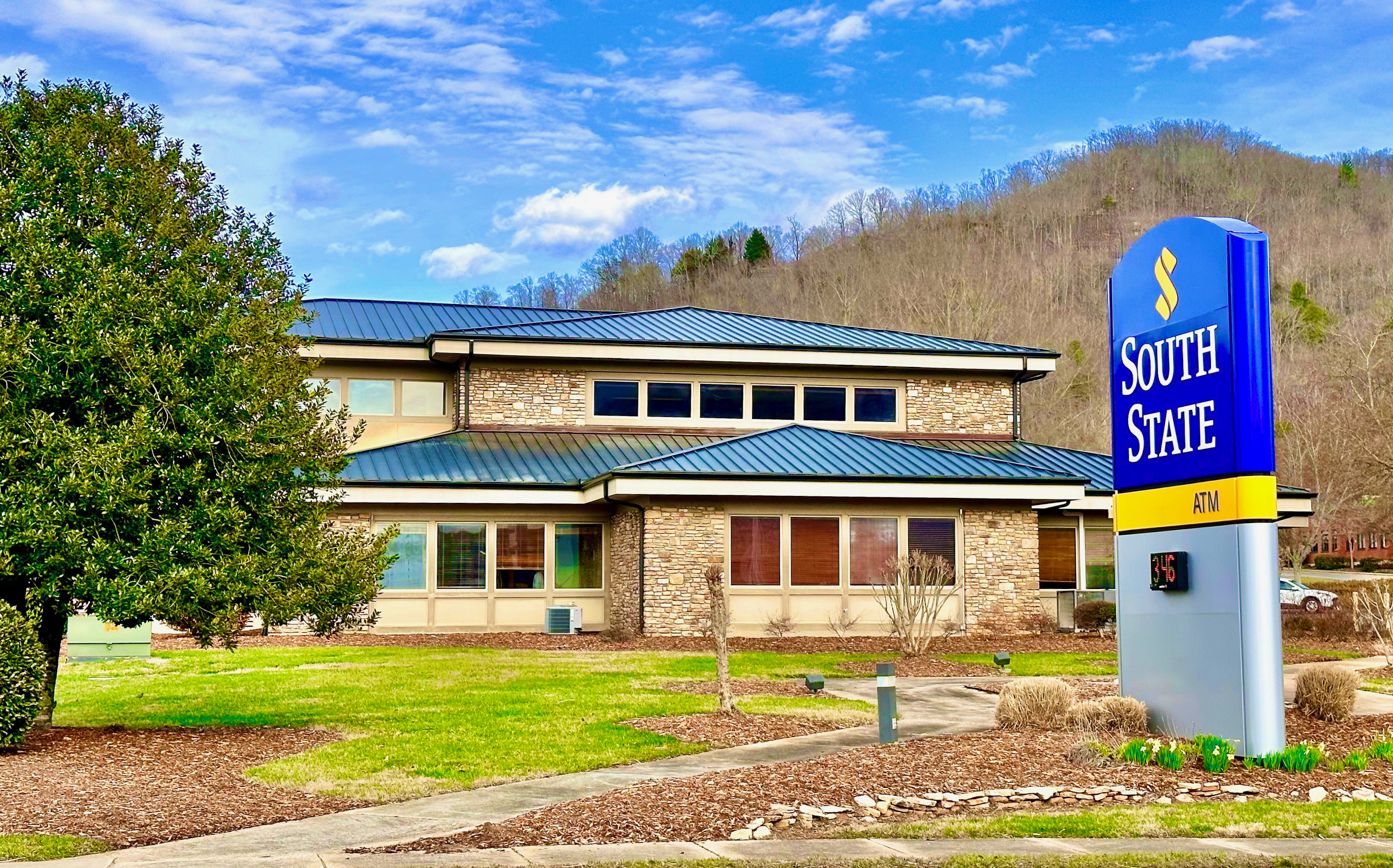
A SouthState Bank in Hiawassee, Georgia

SouthState Bank, based in Winter Haven, Florida, is an American bank and a subsidiary of SouthState Corporation, a bank holding company. As of May 26, 2025, the company had 371 branches in South Carolina, North Carolina, Georgia, Florida, Alabama, Virginia, Colorado and Texas.

First National Bank began in Orangeburg, South Carolina in 1933. In 2002, the bank changed its name to South Carolina Bank and Trust and moved its headquarters to Columbia, South Carolina. As of 2013, 240 people still worked in Orangeburg. SCBT added offices in the Greenville, South Carolina area as well. First National Corp. changed its name to SCBT Financial Corp. in 2003. The bank was South Carolina's fourth largest with $1 billion in assets.

On November 30, 2007, SCBT Financial Corp. completed its acquisition of TSB Financial Corporation and its bank The Scottish Bank, giving SCBT four Charlotte, North Carolina locations and a loan production office in Cornelius, North Carolina. The five locations changed their names to North Carolina Bank and Trust, or NCBT.

In 2013, SCBT Financial Corp. announced a merger with First Financial Holdings of Charleston, started in 1934, which had 66 Carolinas locations and was the third-largest financial institution with headquarters in South Carolina. SCBT had 82 locations in 19 counties in South Carolina, 10 counties in north Georgia, two counties on the Georgia coast and in Mecklenburg County in North Carolina. SCBT president and CEO Robert R. Hill Jr. would remain as CEO, and chair Robert R. Horger would be chair. First Financial president and CEO R. Wayne Hall would become president of the merged company, and First Financial chair Paula Harper Bethea would be vice chair.

The $447 million deal for First Financial was the biggest ever for SCBT Financial, which became the owner of five banks—SCBT; First Federal Bank of Charleston; NCBT of Charlotte, North Carolina; Community Bank & Trust of Cornelia, Georgia; and the Savannah Bank of coastal Georgia. In 2014, SCBT Financial became SouthState Corporation and in June 2014 SCBT became SouthState Bank and First Federal did the same in July. The merger added coastal South Carolina branches to the Midlands and Upstate and gave the bank $8 billion in assets. A former Kroger in North Charleston was converted and expanded in the 1980s for First Federal's back office operations, and it was large enough for the merged company, as other tenants moved out when the time came to do so. Also, in August, SouthState took over 13 Bank of America branches in areas it did not serve.

On January 4, 2017, SouthState announced completion of a deal valued at about $335 million for Augusta, Georgia-based Southeastern Bank Financial Corp., which gave SouthState nine Georgia Bank & Trust branches and three Southern Bank & Trust branches in South Carolina.

On April 27, 2017, SouthState Corp. agreed to acquire Park Sterling Corp. of Charlotte, North Carolina, for $690.8 million. The deal was completed November 30, 2017 with signs changed in April 2018. SouthState added 43 branches, five in Georgia, 23 in South Carolina, 17 in North Carolina and 8 in Virginia.

On June 8, 2020, SouthState completed a merger with CenterState Bank. The new bank will keep the SouthState name, but move its headquarters to Winter Haven, Florida. The combined bank has $34 billion in assets.

On May 20, 2024, SouthState Corporation agreed to acquire Independent Bank Group, based in McKinney, Texas for approximately $2 billion in an all-stock transaction. The transaction took effect on January 1, 2025, adding 92 branches in Texas and Colorado.
