= Pinnacle Financial Partners =

American bank

Pinnacle Financial Partners, Inc.

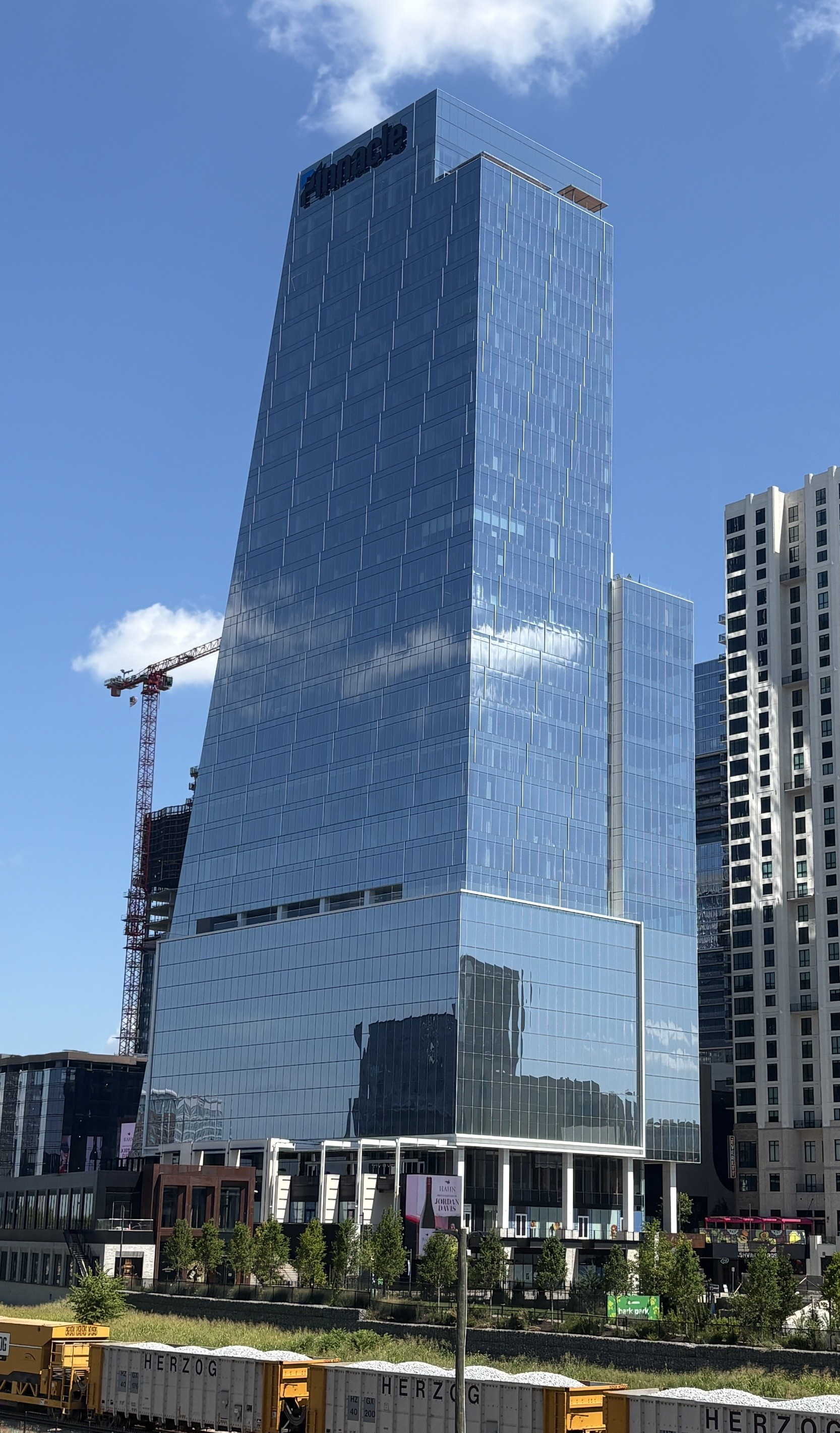
- The Pinnacle at Nashville Yards, the headquarters of Pinnacle Financial Partners in Nashville, Tennessee.
- Type: Public
- Traded as: Nasdaq: PNFP; S&P 400 component
- Industry: Financial services
- Founded: February 20, 2000; 26 years ago
- Founder: M. Terry Turner; Rob McCabe; Hugh Queener
- Headquarters: Nashville, Tennessee; The Pinnacle at Symphony Place (2010–2025); The Pinnacle at Nashville Yards (2025–Present)
- Number of locations: 379 (2026)
- Areas served: Tennessee, Kentucky, Maryland, Virginia, North Carolina, South Carolina, Georgia, Alabama, Florida
- Key people: Kevin Blair (President & CEO); M. Terry Turner (Chairman); Jamie Gregory (CFO); Rob McCabe (Vice Chairman & Chief Banking Officer)
- Revenue: ▲US$1,203 million (Q2 2026)
- Net income: ▲US$328 million (Q2 2026)
- Total assets: ▲US$129,055 million (Q2 2026)
- Total equity: ▲US$14,828 million (Q2 2026)
- Number of employees: 8,433 (Q2 2026)
- Website: pnfp.com

Pinnacle Financial Partners, Inc. is an American bank headquartered in Nashville, Tennessee operating in Tennessee, as well as in Kentucky, Maryland, Virginia, North Carolina, South Carolina, Georgia, Alabama, and Florida.

== History ==
The company was founded on February 20th, 2000, by twelve Nashville businessmen who wished to create a locally owned financial firm. In May 2002, the company went public on the NASDAQ with the symbol PNFP. Pinnacle gained naming rights for a new skyscraper in Downtown Nashville, The Pinnacle at Symphony Place, and the company leased 65,000 square feet (6,000 m^{2}) in the building, moving in during 2010.

On January 22, 2017, Pinnacle announced it was acquiring BNC Bank of High Point, North Carolina, which had branches in North Carolina, South Carolina and Virginia. The deal, worth $1.9 billion and completed June 16, 2017, gave Pinnacle operations in four states.

Pinnacle Financial Partners currently (as of December 31, 2017) has approximately US$22.2 billion in assets and has 115 offices.

As of December 31, 2022, Pinnacle Financial Partners operated 114 offices, including 48 in Tennessee, 37 in North Carolina, 23 in South Carolina, 10 in Virginia, 3 in Georgia and 2 in Alabama.

On June 17, 2021, Pinnacle announced its headquarters would move to four floors of a 37-story tower in Nashville Yards, and that the bank's name would appear on top of the building.

On July 25, 2025, Pinnacle announced its intent to merge with Synovus in an $8.6 billion all-stock deal, thus creating the 28th largest lender in the US, with $116 billion in assets; the transaction was completed January 2, 2026, with the Synovus name to be used until 2027, when all branches will take the Pinnacle name.

== Programs ==
=== Shared Equity Program ===
In 1996, the Housing Fund was created; they are a group that assists first time homebuyers in putting a down payment on their homes. On July 21, 2021, Pinnacle Financial Partners gave a $10 million investment towards their Shared Equity Program. This program provides low income individuals and families with the opportunities and means to buy their first home; by increasing homeownership to previously underserved and marginalized communities, there is a positive push towards increasing the accessibility and affordability of houses. The program is split into three parts: the homebuyers must be able to pay 1% of the price of the home, the program pays for 35%, and the loan from Pinnacle supplies the last 74%. As time goes on, the homeowners can steadily pay off the loan. This was somewhat modeled off of the concept of limited equity in order to build up the wealth for lower income people, allowing them to obtain access to opportunities that would result in an increase in wealth and prosperity.

This program has many similarities to a typical community land trust.
