= Astoria Bank =

Bank based in Long Island City, New York

Astoria Financial Corporation
- Industry: Financial services
- Founded: 1888; 138 years ago
- Defunct: October 2, 2017; 8 years ago
- Fate: Acquired by Sterling Bancorp
- Headquarters: Lake Success, New York
- Area served: New York metropolitan area
- Key people: Monte N. Redman, CEO; Ralph F. Palleschi, Chairman; Frank E. Fusco, CFO
- Revenue: ▲$0.454 billion (2016)
- Net income: ▼$0.071 billion (2016)
- Total assets: ▼$14.558 billion (2016)
- Total equity: ▲$1.714 billion (2016)
- Owner: Sterling Bancorp
- Number of employees: 1,328

Astoria Financial Corporation was a bank holding company based in Lake Success, New York. On October 2, 2017, the company was acquired by Sterling Bancorp.

As of December 31, 2016, the company's principal subsidiary, Astoria Bank, operated 88 locations.

== History ==
The bank was chartered by New York State in 1888. In 1936 the name was changed to Astoria Savings & Loan Association. In 1937, the bank received a federal charter and became Astoria Federal Savings & Loan Association.

In 1989, George L. Engelke, Jr. was named president and chief executive officer of the company. In 1993, Astoria Financial Corporation was created as part of the conversion from a mutual organization to a joint-stock company.

In the 1990s, the bank acquired a number of other banks in the New York area. In 1995, the bank acquired Fidelity New York Savings Bank for $160 million in cash. In 1997, the bank acquired Greater New York Savings Bank for $293 million in stock and cash. In 1998, the bank acquired Long Island Savings Bank for $1.8 billion.

In 2012, George L. Engelke, Jr. resigned as chairman.

In 2017, the bank was acquired by Sterling Bancorp. At the time of the merger, the two banks had a combined value of approximately $30 billion in assets, $20 billion in gross loans, and over $19 billion in deposits, and planned to operate under the Sterling Bancorp name.
