= Sterling Bancorp =

U.S. banking company

- Company type: Public company
- Traded as: NYSE: STL
- Industry: Financial services
- Founded: 1888
- Defunct: February 1, 2022
- Fate: Acquired by Webster Bank
- Headquarters: Montebello, New York, U.S.
- Area served: New York (state)
- Key people: Richard L. O'Toole (Chairman); Jack Kopnisky (President & CEO)
- Total assets: US$31.33 billion (December 31, 2018)

Sterling Bancorp was an American regional bank holding company that owned Sterling National Bank. It merged into Webster Bank in February 2022.

Prior to the Webster merger, Sterling National Bank provided a full range of banking and financial services to business owners, their families, and consumers, primarily in the greater New York metropolitan and Hudson Valley regions. Sterling Bancorp had assets of approximately $30 billion at October 2, 2017, following its acquisition of Astoria Financial Corp. Headquartered in Montebello, New York, Sterling Bancorp's shares were traded on the New York Stock Exchange.

== History ==
The bank was founded in 1888 under the name Provident Bank. It later became a subsidiary of Provident New York Bancorp.

On August 10, 2012, the company acquired Gotham Bank of New York, which enabled the company to expand into the New York City marketplace.

On October 31, 2013, the company acquired Sterling Bancorp through a merger. Provident changed its legal name to Sterling Bancorp and the name of its principal banking subsidiary to Sterling National Bank. The merger was intended to create a larger, more diversified company with a broader range of products and services for small-to-middle market commercial clients and consumers.

On June 30, 2015, Sterling completed the acquisition of Hudson Valley Holding Corp., which further expanded its presence in the greater New York Metropolitan region.

The company also made smaller acquisitions to add specialized products and services, most recently including Damian Services Corp., a payroll financing business (acquired March 2, 2015), and a factoring portfolio from First Capital Corp. (acquired May 18, 2015).

Its acquisition of Astoria Bank closed at the start of October 2017. On March 6, 2018, the company announced the acquisition of Advantage Funding Management.

On April 9, 2018, the FBI raided Michael D. Cohen’s law offices to seek communications with Sterling National Bank and any information about his loans from Sterling National Bank against his taxi business.

In October 2019, Sterling Bancorp's Sterling National Bank agreed to acquire a portfolio of middle market commercial equipment finance loans and leases from Santander Bank. As of September 2019, the balance of the loans and leases outstanding to be acquired was $843 million.

In April 2021, Webster Bank and Sterling Bancorp's Sterling National Bank agreed to an all stock merger in an all-stock deal worth about $10.3 billion. The merger was completed on February 1, 2022 and will keep the name Webster Bank.

== Differentiation ==
Prior to its acquisition by Webster, the company pursued a strategy of becoming a high-performing banking institution with a focus on serving small to middle market commercial businesses and affluent consumers. The bank believed this client segment is frequently underserved by larger bank competitors in its market area. Sterling employed a team-based strategy in which each client is served by a relationship team that provides a single point of contact for delivering the bank’s products and services and manages all aspects of the client relationship.
