= First Fidelity Bank =

American private bank in Oklahoma City

- Company type: Privately owned bank
- Founded: 1920
- Headquarters: Oklahoma City, Oklahoma, United States
- Key people: Lee R. Symcox (president)
- Total assets: $2 billion (2020)
- Website: www.ffb.com

First Fidelity Bank is an American retail bank and financial services corporation which was chartered in Oklahoma in 1920. The bank is a subsidiary of First Fidelity Bancorp, which was founded in 1982. The bank is co-owned by Lee R. Symcox, his wife Suzanne Symcox, Bill Cameron and his sister Lynda Cameron. The bank is headquartered in Oklahoma City, and has 29 branches in Oklahoma, Arizona and Colorado. As of 2020, First Fidelity Bank has $2 billion in total assets.

== History ==
First Fidelity Bank was founded in 1920 as the First State Bank of Norman. The bank was acquired in 1952 by the Symcox family. In 1981, the bank was chartered as Commercial Bank, National Association.

In 1992, First Fidelity Bank merged with City National Bank. The resulting bank, valued at $240 million, became Oklahoma's fifth largest bank at the time. In 2002, First Fidelity Bank expanded into Tulsa, and the bank opened its doors in Arizona in 2004. By 2006, First Fidelity Bank was ranked as the third largest bank in the Oklahoma City metropolitan area.

First Fidelity Bank continued to grow through a number of acquisitions between 2006 and 2013. The bank acquired Edmond Bank & Trust in 2006 and Western Security Bank in 2007. In 2010, First Fidelity Bank acquired $80 million in deposits from Home National Bank in Arizona. In 2013, First Fidelity Bank acquired Sunrise Bank of Arizona, adding its $202.2 million in total assets.

== Operations ==
First Fidelity Bank is a retail bank headquartered in Oklahoma City, which operates in Oklahoma, Arizona and Colorado. It is a subsidiary of First Fidelity Bancorp, which was founded in 1982. The bank offers checking, deposits, loans, mortgages, insurance, investments and pensions, and as of 2014, it has 30 branch locations. As of 2020, the bank holds more than $2 billion in assets.

The bank was one of the first banks in the United States to launch a mobile deposit application, which it released in 2012. In 2014, the bank announced its intention to partner with Apple Pay.

== Corporate ==
First Fidelity Bank is privately held bank, whose owners comprise chairman Bill Cameron and his sister Lynda Cameron, in partnership with husband and wife Lee R. Symcox, the bank's president and chief executive officer, and Suzanne Symcox, executive vice president.

First Fidelity Bank became the jersey sponsor of United Soccer League professional men's team Oklahoma City Energy FC in its inaugural 2014 season.

== See also ==
- American Fidelity Assurance
