= List of East Carolina University alumni =

The Class of 1914 of then-East Carolina Teacher Training School, with 38 graduates

This list of East Carolina University alumni includes graduates, non-graduate former students and current students of East Carolina University. East Carolina alumni are generally known as Pirates.

The first class of 123 students entered ECTTS in 1909, and the first 16 graduates received their degrees in 1911. Since then, the institute has greatly expanded, with an enrollment of 17,728 undergraduates and 5,436 postgraduate students as of Spring 2007.

== Business ==
Name	Class year	Notability	References
John A. Allison IV	1995	Former chairman and CEO of BB&T	
Marc Basnight	1996	N.C. state senator; president pro tem; restaurant owner	
Mark Kemp	1983	Former editor of Discover Magazine; former vice president of Programming for MTV; author	
Kelly King	1970	Former CEO of BB&T	
James Maynard	1965	Founder of Golden Corral	
Linda McMahon	1969	Current United States Secretary of Education; 25th Administrator of the Small Business Administration; former president and CEO of WWE	
Vince McMahon	1968	Former chairman and CEO of WWE	

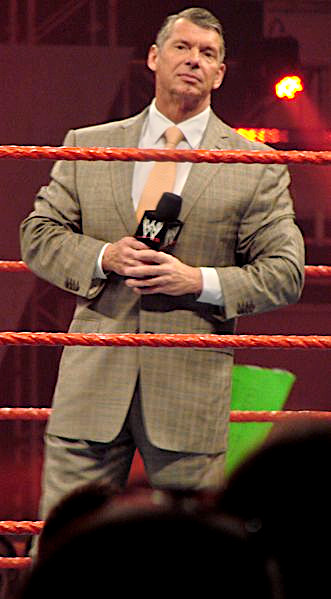
Vince McMahon

== Athletics ==
=== Administration ===
Name	Class year	Notability	References
Hal Baird	1971	Former head baseball coach, Auburn Tigers	
Erik Bakich	2000	Head baseball coach, University of Michigan	
Billy Godwin	1995	Former head baseball coach, East Carolina Pirates	
George Koonce	1999, 2006	Director of Athletics, University of Wisconsin–Milwaukee	
Ruffin McNeill	1980	Former head coach, East Carolina Pirates, current assistant head coach and defensive tackles coach at the University of Oklahoma	
Dave Odom	1969	Former head basketball coach, South Carolina Gamecocks, Wake Forest Demon Deacons, and East Carolina Pirates	
Jamie Reed	1982	Head athletic trainer, Texas Rangers	
Mike Sutton	1978	Former head men's basketball coach, Tennessee Tech Golden Eagles	
Kay Yow	1964	Former women's basketball program head coach, NC State Wolfpack	

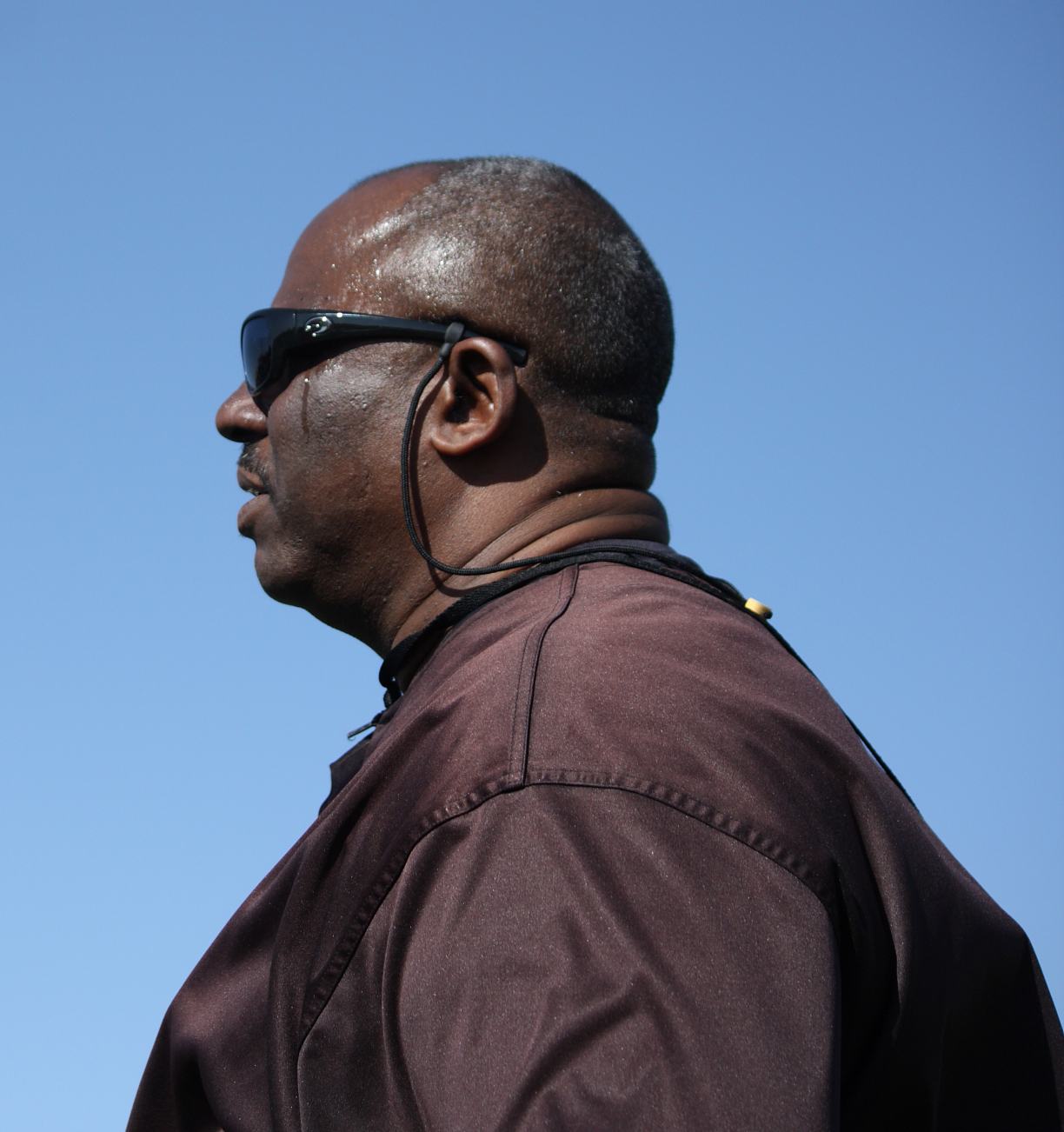
Ruffin McNeill

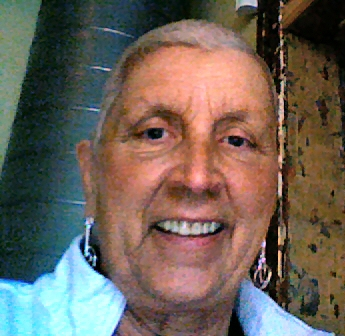
Kay Yow

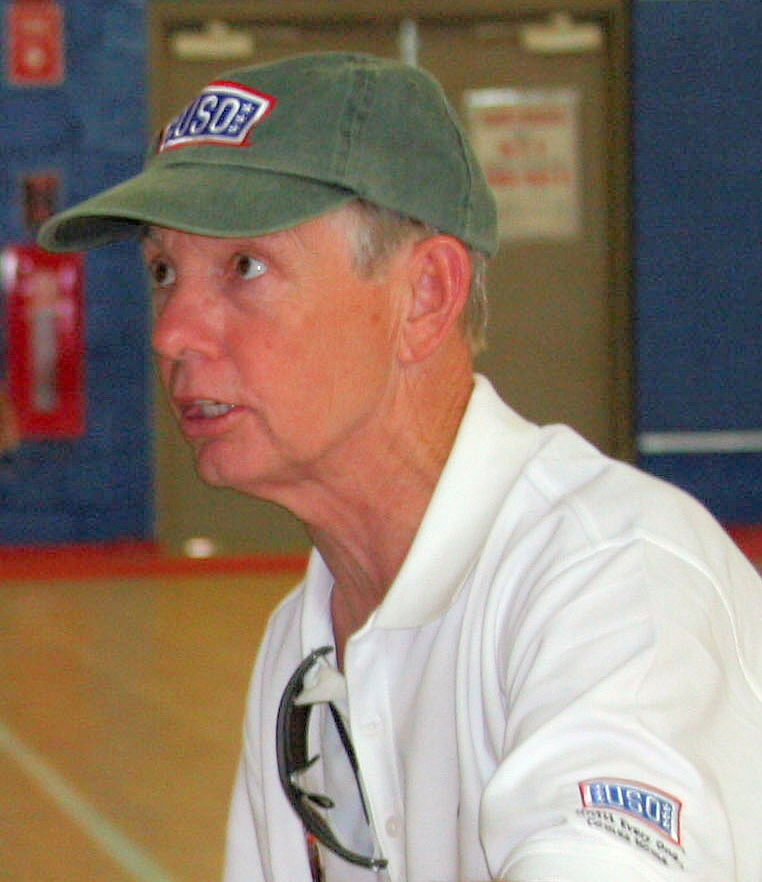
Dave Odom

=== American football ===
==== Athletes ====
Name	Class year	Position	Notability	Reference(s)
Reggie Branch	1984	Running back	NFL player	
Mic'hael Brooks	2013	Defensive tackle	NFL player, CFL All-Star	
DeVone Claybrooks	2001	Defensive tackle	NFL player, CFL All-Star	
Terrance Copper	2004	Wide receiver	NFL player	
Marcus Crandell	1997	Quarterback	NFL player	
Damane Duckett	2004	Defensive lineman	NFL player	
David Garrard	2001	Quarterback	NFL player, Pro Bowl selection	
Dan Gonzalez	1998	Quarterback	CFL player	
John Jett	1993	Punter	NFL player	
George Koonce	1992	Linebacker	NFL player	
Vonta Leach	2004	Fullback	NFL player, 3x All-Pro, 3x Pro Bowl selection	
Dwayne Ledford	1998	Offensive lineman	NFL player	
Vinson Smith	1988	Linebacker	NFL player	
Keith Stokes	2001	Wide receiver	NFL player, 2x CFL All-Star	

=== American soccer ===
Name	Class year	Notability	References
Clyde Simms	2003	Major League Soccer D.C. United player, 2005–2013	

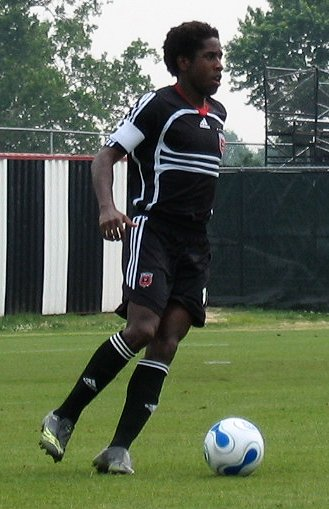
Clyde Simms

=== Baseball ===
Name	Class year	Notability	References
Butch Davis	1980	MLB outfielder 1983–1994	
Mike Hartley	1981	MLB pitcher 1984–1995	
Jerry Narron		MLB player 1979–1987, manager, and coach	
Johnny Narron		MLB coach	
Sam Narron	2002	MLB player 2004	
Chad Tracy	2001	MLB player 2004–2013	
Pat Watkins	1993	MLB outfielder 1997–1999	

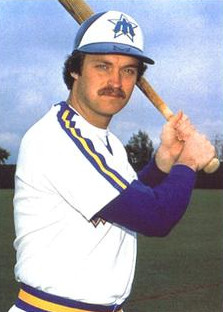
Jerry Narron

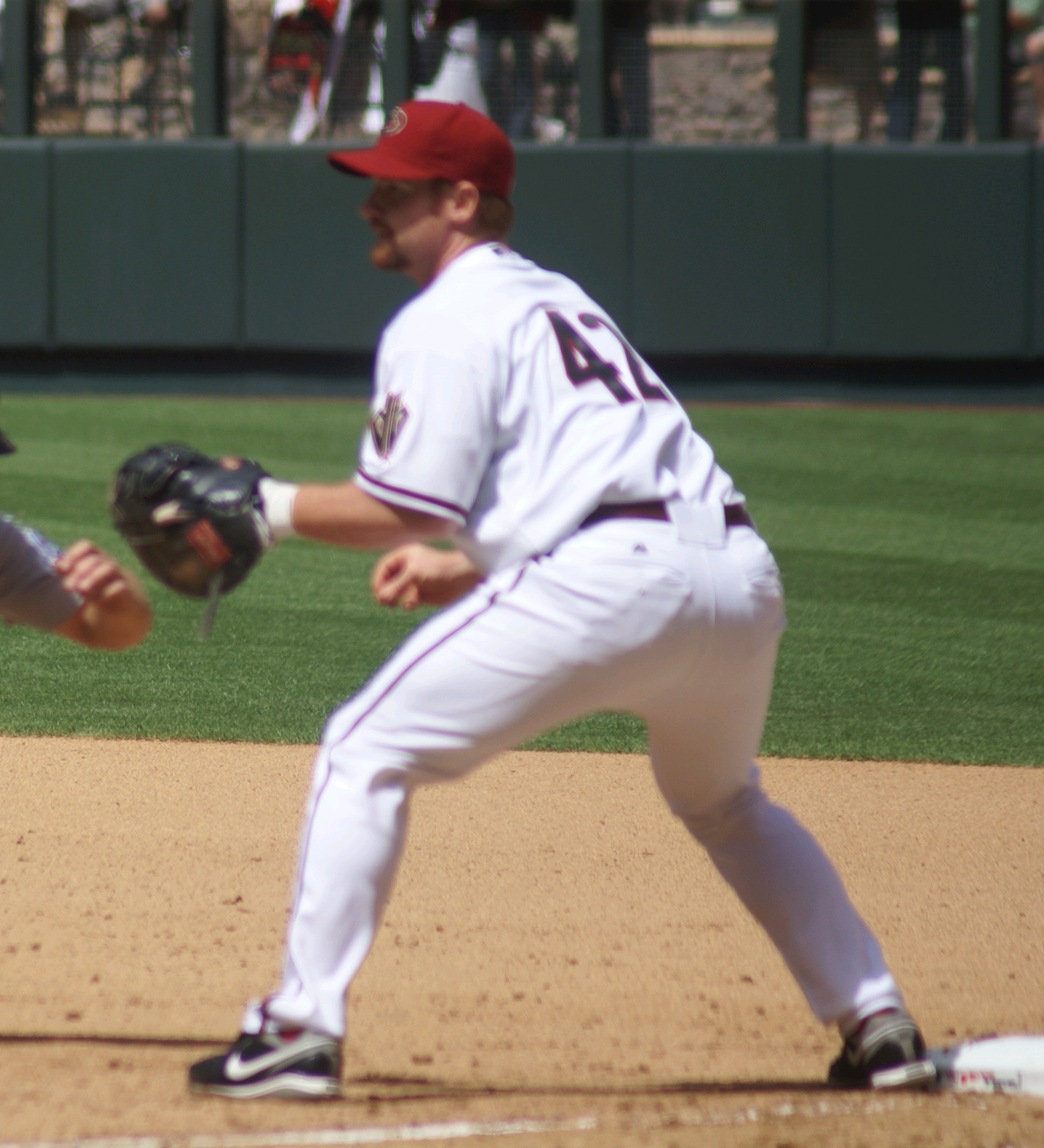
Chad Tracy

=== Basketball ===
Name	Class year	Notability	Reference(s)
Blue Edwards	1989	Former NBA, Utah Jazz forward	
Maurice Kemp		Basketball player in the Israeli Basketball Premier League	
Jonathan Kerner	1997	Former NBA, New Jersey Nets center	
Oliver Mack	1979	Former NBA, Los Angeles Lakers guard	
Bob McKillop	1969 (did not graduate)	Former NBA, Philadelphia 76ers; Davidson Wildcats head coach	

=== Olympics and Paralympics ===
Name	Class year	Notability	References
Héctor Cotto	2008, 2012	27th, 42nd in 110 m hurdles	
Lex Gillette	2007	Silver – 2008 Summer Paralympics – men's long jump – F11; silver – 2004 Summer Paralympics – men's long jump – F11	
LaShawn Merritt	2005	Gold – 2007 Osaka – 4x400 m relay; silver – 2007 Osaka – 400 m; gold – 2008 Beijing – 400 m; gold – 2008 Beijing – 4x400 m relay; gold – 2009 Berlin – 400 m; gold – 2009 Berlin – 4x400m relay	

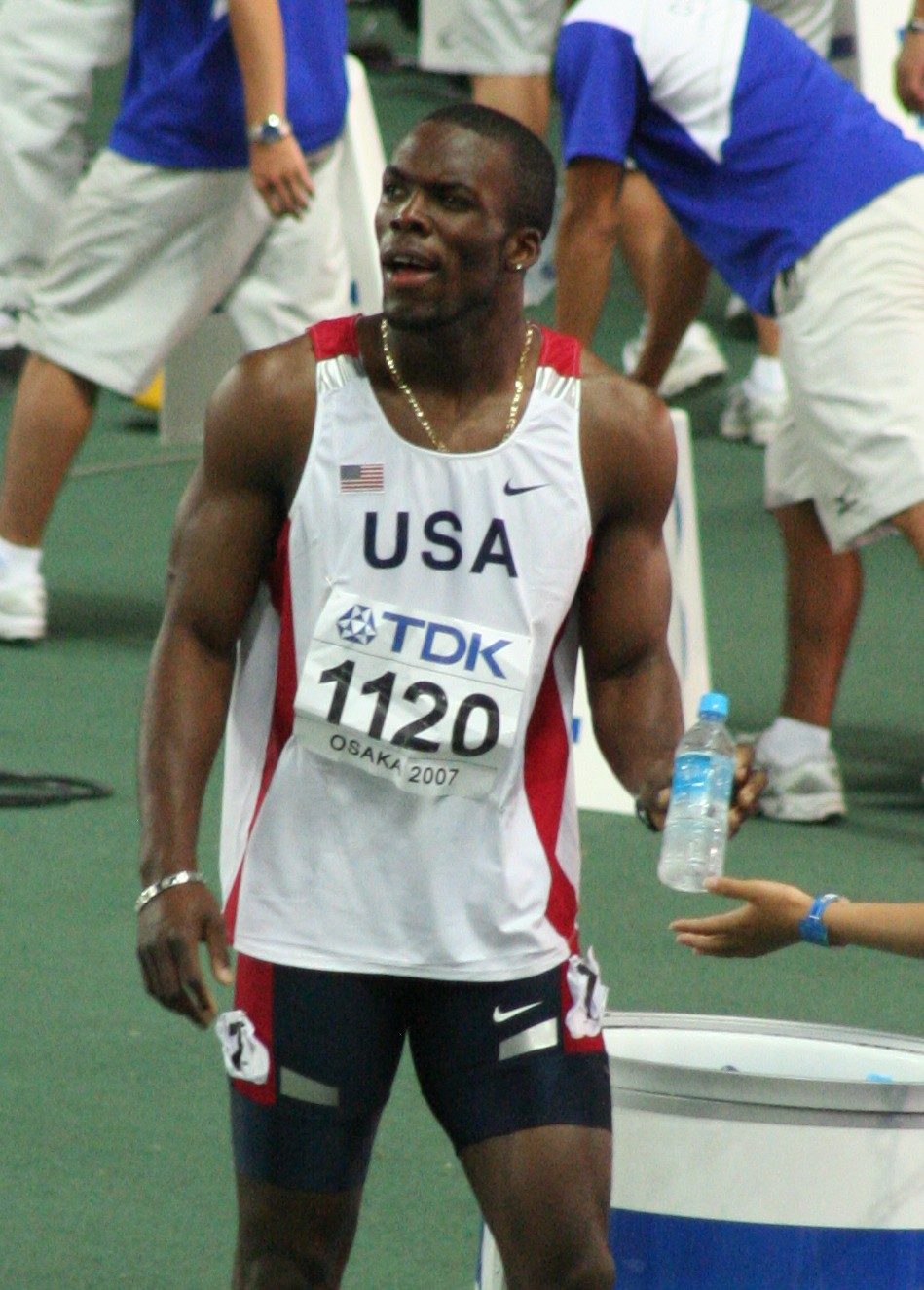
LaShawn Merritt

=== NASCAR ===
Name	Class year	Notability	References
Jeff Hammond	1970	Former NASCAR crew chief; current Fox Sports NASCAR commentator; former football player	

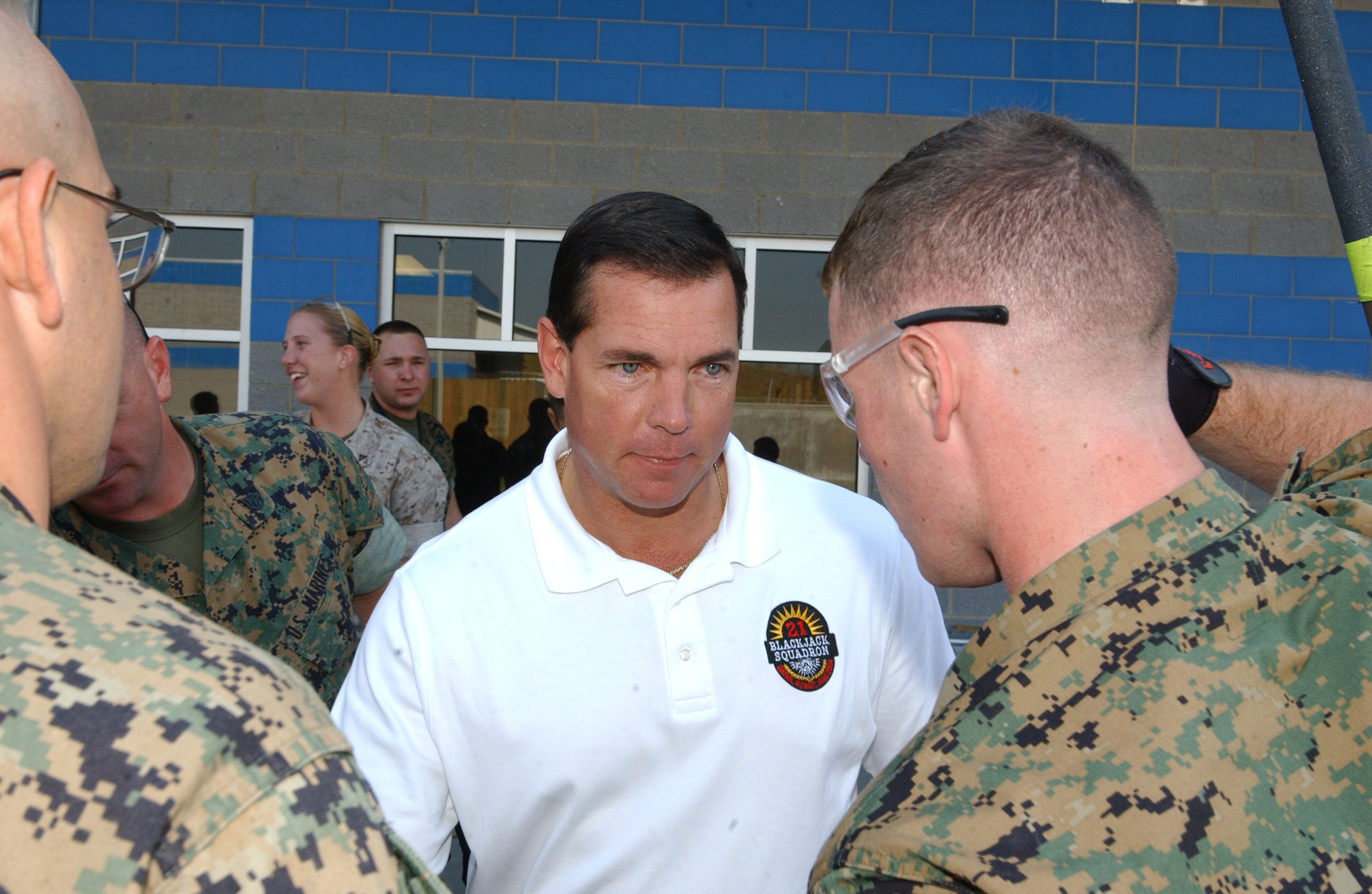
Jeff Hammond

== Humanities ==
=== Arts and entertainment ===
Name	Class year	Notability	References
Scott Avett	1999	Musician, The Avett Brothers	
Watson Brown		Photographer	
Sandra Bullock	1986	Actress, producer	
Constance Bumgarner Gee		Scholar, advocate of medical use of cannabis	
Carter Cruise	2013	DJ, producer, model, and pornographic actress	
Kristen Dalton	2010	Miss Universe 2009 (Top 10); Miss USA 2009; Miss North Carolina USA 2009	
Nia Franklin	2011	Miss America 2019; Miss New York 2018	
Beth Grant	1971	Actress	
Loonis McGlohon	1942	Composer, producer, arranger; Peabody Award winner, Grammy-nominated	
Maureen O'Boyle	n/a	News anchor	
Mary-Jean O'Doherty	2005	Opera singer	
Emily Procter	1991	Actress	
Dana Reason	2002	Miss North Carolina 2003	
Nina Repeta	1999	Actress	
Sonny Siaki	1998	Former NFL inside linebacker; Samoan professional wrestler	
Kevin Williamson	1987	Writer, producer, director, actor	

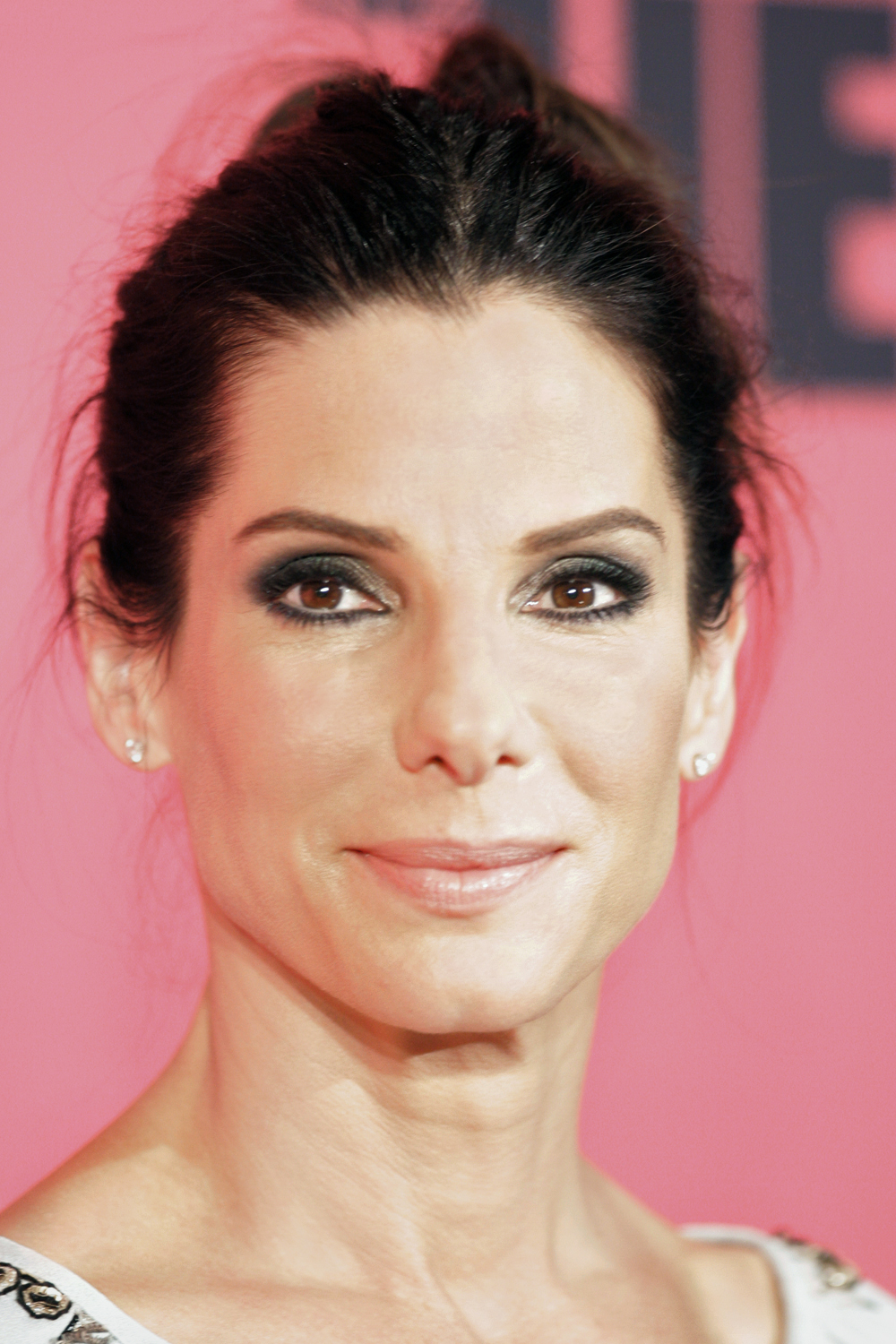
Sandra Bullock

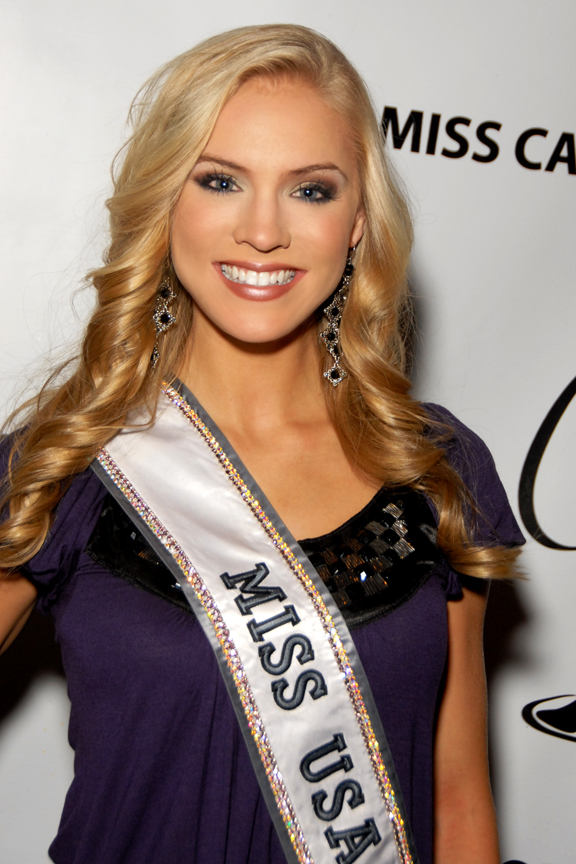
Kristen Dalton

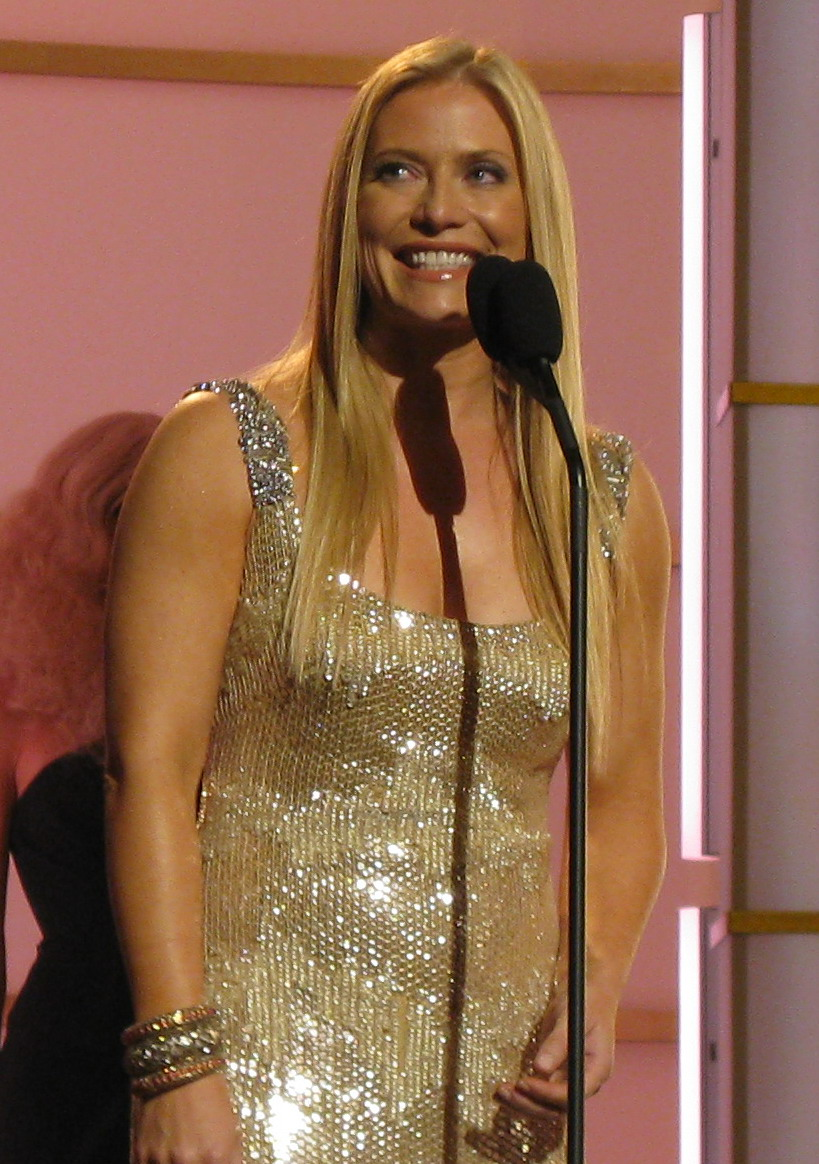
Emily Procter

=== Authors ===
Name	Class year	Notability	Reference(s)
Marshall Moore	1992	Author	
Luke Whisnant	1979	Author	

=== Emmy Award winners ===
Name	Class year	Notability	Reference(s)
John Beard	1980	Fox News anchor in Los Angeles, Emmy Award winner	
Velton Ray Bunch	1971	Composer, arranger, Emmy Award winner	

=== Politics ===
Name	Class year	Notability	References
Larry M. Bell	EdS 1983	Democratic Whip, North Carolina House of Representatives	
Harry Blevins	B.S.	Senator, Virginia Senate	
Don Davis	M.A., Ed.D.	Congressman, US House of Representatives from North Carolina's 1st congressional district; senator, North Carolina Senate; mayor, Snow Hill	
Jean Farmer-Butterfield	Bachelors	Majority whip, North Carolina House of Representatives	
Marvin W. Lucas	EdS	Representative, North Carolina House of Representatives	
Marian McLawhorn	B.S., B.A. 1967; M.L.S. 1988	Representative, North Carolina House of Representatives	
Robert Burren Morgan	1947	U.S. senator, North Carolina Attorney General	
Jean Rouse Preston	B.S. 1957, MEd 1973	Senator, North Carolina Senate	
Paul Stam	Attended, 1969–1970	Minority leader, North Carolina House of Representatives	
Bonner Lee Stiller	B.S. 1978	Representative, North Carolina House of Representatives	
Edith D. Warren	B.S. 1960; M.A. 1974	Representative, North Carolina House of Representatives	
Beth Wood	1984	Auditor of North Carolina	
Douglas Yongue	B.S. 1959, M.A. 1960	Representative, North Carolina House of Representatives	

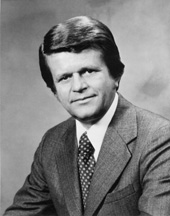
Robert Morgan

=== Public service ===
Name	Class year	Notability	Reference(s)
Ron Clark	1994	Author, Disney's 2005 Teacher of the Year	
William C. Harrison	1980 M.A.	Chairman and CEO of the North Carolina State Board of Education	

==== Military service ====
Name	Class year	Notability	References
Nate Bell	1977, current	Brigadier general; assistant adjutant general	
William M. Faulkner	1982	Brigadier general; commanding general, 3rd Marine Logistics Group	
Gary L. North	1976	General; commander, Pacific Air Forces; Air Component commander for U.S. Pacific Command; and executive director, Pacific Air Combat Operations Staff	

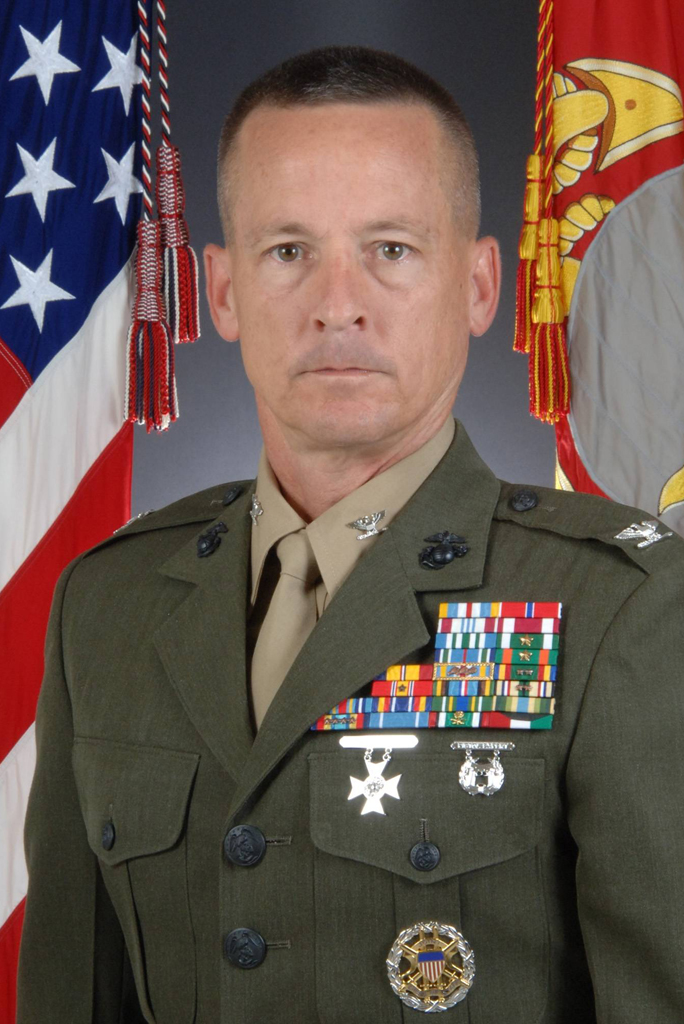
William M. Faulkner

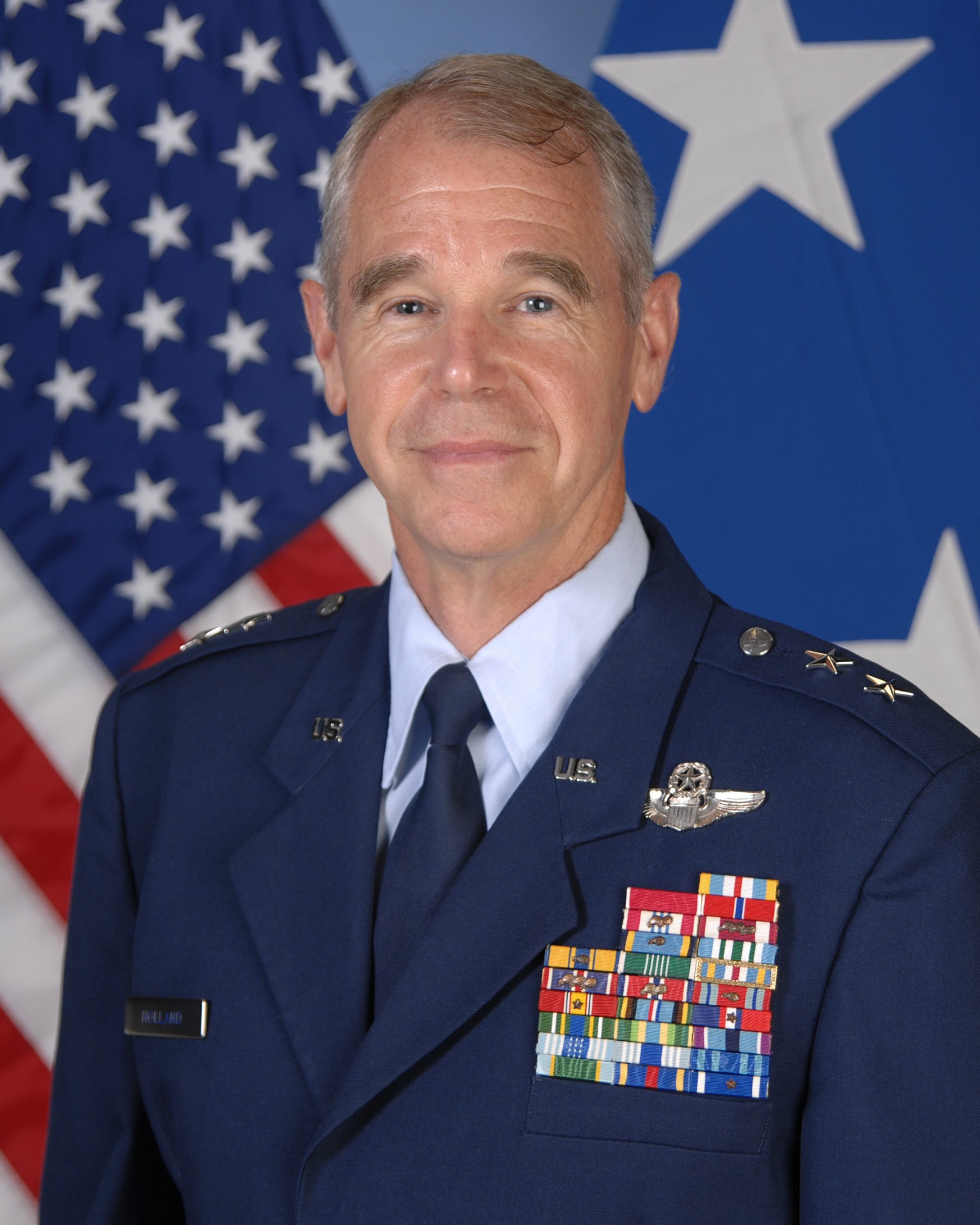
William L. Holland

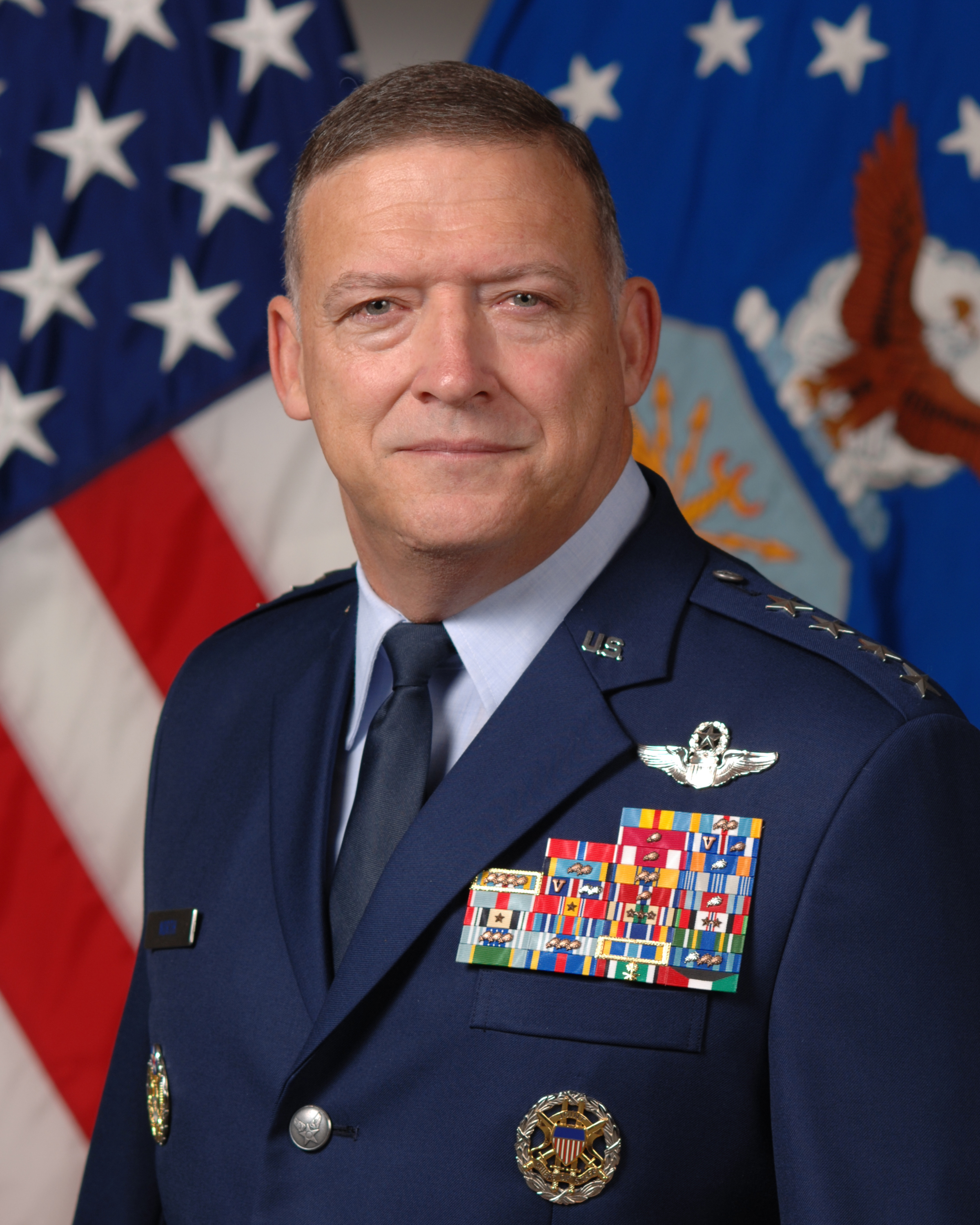
Gary L. North

=== Pulitzer Prize winners ===
Name	Class year	Notability	References
Rick Atkinson	1974	Pulitzer Prize winner – History, 2003, An Army at Dawn; Public Service, 1999; National Reporting, 1982	
Dan Neil	1982	Pulitzer Prize winner – Distinguished Criticism, 2004	
Sandra Mims Rowe	1970	Pulitzer Prize winner – Editorial Writing, 2006; Feature Writing, 2001 and 2002; Gold Medal for Public Service, 2001; Explanatory Reporting, 1999; New Reporting, 1985	

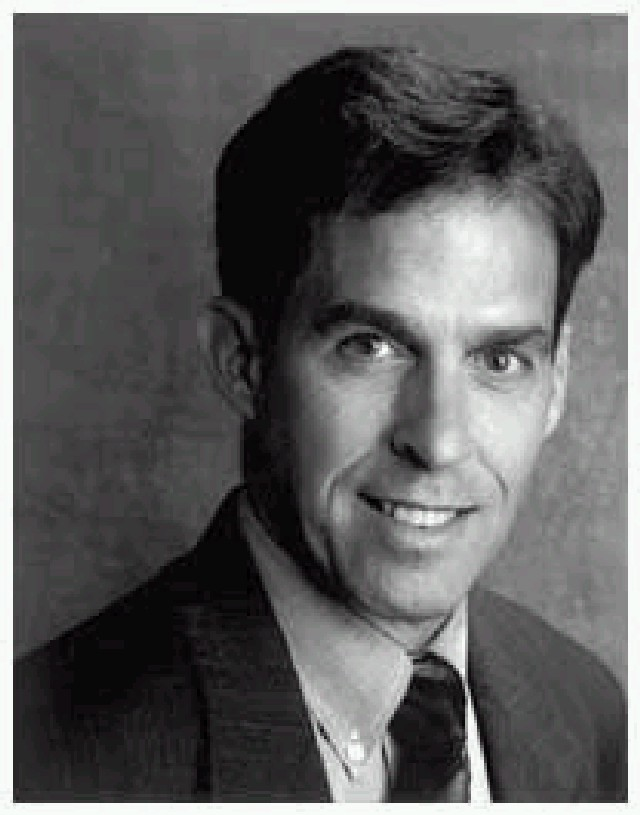
Rick Atkinson
