= Wachovia Center =

Wachovia Center may refer to:

- Wachovia Center (Philadelphia), now Xfinity Mobile Arena, an arena
- Wachovia Center (Tampa), now Wells Fargo Center, an office tower
- Wachovia Center (Winston-Salem), now 100 Main Street, a skyscraper
