= List of tallest buildings in Winston-Salem =

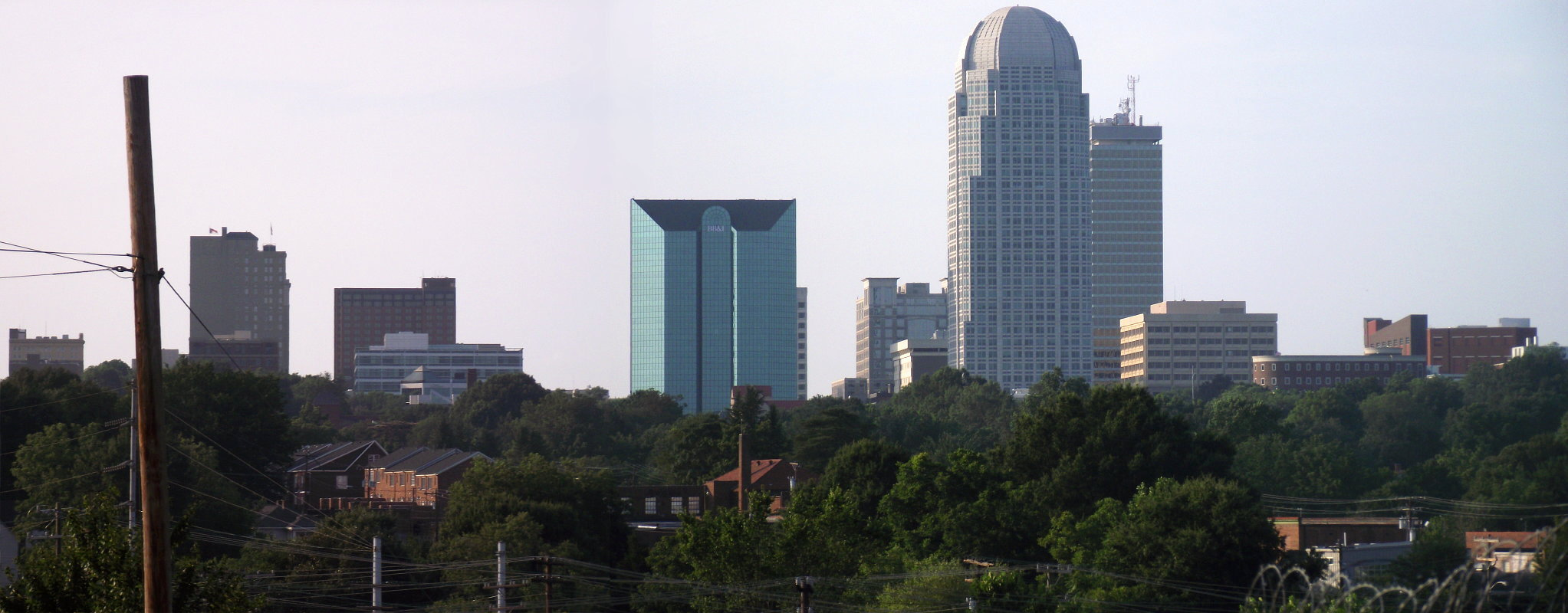
Skyline of Winston-Salem

Below is a list of the tallest buildings in Winston-Salem, North Carolina above 200 feet. The tallest building in Winston-Salem is 100 North Main Street. The second-tallest building was the tallest in Winston-Salem from 1966 to 1995 and the tallest building in North Carolina from 1966 to 1971, when Two Wells Fargo Center in Charlotte was constructed.

== Tallest buildings ==
Rank	Name	Image	Height ft / m	Floors	Year	Notes
1	100 North Main Street		460 / 140	34	1995	Tallest building in Winston-Salem since 1995, as well as the tallest in North Carolina outside of Charlotte and Raleigh The building contains 549,000 square feet (51,000 m^{2}) of space. It was 95% leased as of February 2012; tenants at the time included Wells Fargo, Deutsche Bank Securities, Morgan Stanley Smith Barney and Wake Forest Baptist Medical Center. In October 2018, WFC Property LLC of Oklahoma City purchased the building for $62 million.
2	Winston Tower		410 / 125	30	1966	Tallest building in Winston-Salem from 1966 to 1995. Tallest building in Winston-Salem constructed in the 1960s.
3	GMAC Tower		330 / 110.6	21	1980	
4	Reynolds Building		314 / 95.7	22	1929	Tallest building in Winston-Salem from 1929 to 1966.
5	BB&T Financial Center		273 / 83.2	21	1987	Office building.
6	RJR Plaza Building		269 / 82	12	1929	
7	Nissen Building		246 / 75	20	1927	Tallest building in Winston-Salem from 1927 to 1929.
8	Marriott Winston Plaza Hotel		237 / 72.2	19	1984	Tallest full-service hotel in Winston Salem
9	Liberty Plaza		230 / 70.1	14	1973	
10	Janeway Clinical Sciences Tower	Upload image	225 / 68.6	12	1989	
11	One West Fourth Street		211 / 64.3	13	2002	

== Timeline of tallest buildings ==
Name	Image	Height ft (m)	Floors	Years tallest
Nissen Building		246 / 75	20	1927–1929
Reynolds Building		314 / 95.7	22	1929–1966
Winston Tower		410 / 125	30	1966–1995
100 North Main Street		460 / 140	34	1995–present

== See also ==
- List of tallest buildings in North Carolina
- List of tallest buildings in Charlotte
- List of tallest buildings in Greensboro
- List of tallest buildings in Raleigh
- National Register of Historic Places listings in Forsyth County, North Carolina, which includes Nissen Building, 8 West Third Street, and perhaps more tall buildings of Winston-Salem.
