= Southern National Bank =

American banking company

Southern National Bank was a bank headquartered first in Lumberton, North Carolina and then in Winston-Salem, North Carolina. It joined with BB&T (now Truist) in 1995.

== History ==
In 1897, former North Carolina governor Angus MacLean and Judge Thomas A. McNeill started the Bank of Lumberton with $15,000. In 1955, MacLean's son Hector became president, and in 1959, The National Bank of Lumberton changed its name to Southern National.

In 1979, Carolina State Bank of Gastonia, started in 1971, became part of Southern National.

In 1982, Southern National took over Winston-Salem-based Forsyth Bank & Trust, led by Glenn Orr.

In 1985, Southern National had assets of $1.5 billion. With the purchase of a former Northwestern Bank branch in Hickory, which had to be sold after the First Union-Northwestern merger, Southern National had 99 branches in 26 counties.

In 1986, Southern National Corporation entered South Carolina with the $10 million purchase of Horry County National Bank of Loris. Later that year, Southern National announced the $5.6 million purchase of First Palmetto Bancshares Corp. of Columbia and the $9.75 million purchase of Capital Bank and Trust Co. of Belton. At the time, Southern National was North Carolina's seventh-largest banking company.

Also in 1986, Southern National sold its Southern National Mortgage Co. to NCNB for an estimated $7 million. Southern National had not intended to sell the business but NCNB made a good offer and the bank could use the money for its South Carolina purchases. NCNB had exited the mortgage business in 1981 to concentrate on interstate banking, though NCNB bought Bank of North Carolina in 1982 and sold that bank's mortgages to Southern National.

In May 1989, Southern National announced its purchase of Allied Bankshares Inc. of Thomson, Georgia. The $59 million deal fell apart but would have been the first acquisition of a Georgia bank by a mid-sized N.C. bank. Another failed deal in 1990 would have given Southern National $1 billion in South Carolina assets and 53 offices in the state. NBSC had $540 million in assets, while Southern National Corp. had $3.4 billion and was N.C.'s fifth largest bank holding company. NBSC shareholders objected to the $53 million deal.

In 1990, with Hector MacLean's retirement, Orr took over the top spot at Southern National Corporation. As the bank grew, it became more difficult to recruit qualified executives to a town of 19,000 people. Several cities were considered, and Edward Pleasants of Winston-Salem, a member of the bank's local board, began a campaign to move Southern National to his city.

Also in 1990, Southern National bought two savings and loans with combined assets of $223 million--Western Carolina Savings and Loan Association in Valdese and Mutual Federal Savings and Loan Association of Elkin.

In 1991, Southern National took over two failed savings and loans, Preferred Savings Bank of High Point and Southeastern Savings Bank of Charlotte. Also that year, Southern National announced its largest acquisition yet--Workmen's Federal Savings Bank of Mount Airy, with $260 million in assets.

In an unusual transaction in 1992, Southern National paid $3 million for $60 million in loans and $50 million in deposits of First Security Savings Bank of Pinehurst. The Resolution Trust Corporation, which had the duty of taking over failed savings and loans, had to obtain clearance for the sale from the Office of Thrift Supervision, because while its former parent First Federal Savings Association of Raleigh had failed in December 1990, First Security was healthy. Three of First Security's four branches closed and customers were sent to other Southern National branches. The deal made Southern National the number three bank by deposits in Moore County.

Early in 1993, Southern National completed its purchase of First Federal Savings Bank in Winston-Salem, putting Southern National behind only Wachovia in Forsyth County deposits. Southern National had $4.5 billion in assets, $3.9 billion of those in North Carolina, and was the state's sixth largest banking company. The company's North Carolina banking operations began moving to Winston-Salem, though Orr and the corporate headquarters stayed in Lumberton. One reason for the move was the 20-story, 239,000-square-foot (22,200 m^{2}) One Triad Park, which had 74,000 square feet (6,900 m^{2}) of space Southern National could move into immediately. One of the other contenders, Greensboro, would not have a new building ready, and the bank would need a temporary home. With Southern National taking 80,000 square feet (7,400 m^{2}) on eight floors, the building's name changed to Southern National Financial Center on May 3.

Also in 1993, Southern National announced the purchase of Goldsboro-based East Coast Federal Savings Bank, with $256 million in assets, which Orr called "one of the best savings banks in the state." The deal would make Southern National number one in deposits in Fayetteville, the state's fifth-largest banking market. In 1993, Southern National announced the acquisition of First Savings Bank, FSB, headquartered in Greenville, South Carolina. With just over $2 billion in assets, it was the third largest financial institution in South Carolina.

On August 1, 1994, BB&T and Southern National announced a "merger of equals". The merged bank would be called BB&T, though at first, the holding company was Southern National Corp. With $19 billion in assets, BB&T would have the most North Carolina deposits and branches of any bank. Orr and new BB&T chairman John Allison said the merger would likely prevent out-of-state banks from taking over. Orr retired once the merger was complete. The headquarters became BB&T Financial Center.

On May 19, 1997, Southern National Corp. changed its name to BB&T Corp. and its stock symbol SN to BBT.
