= John A. Allison IV =

American business executive (born 1948)

John Allison
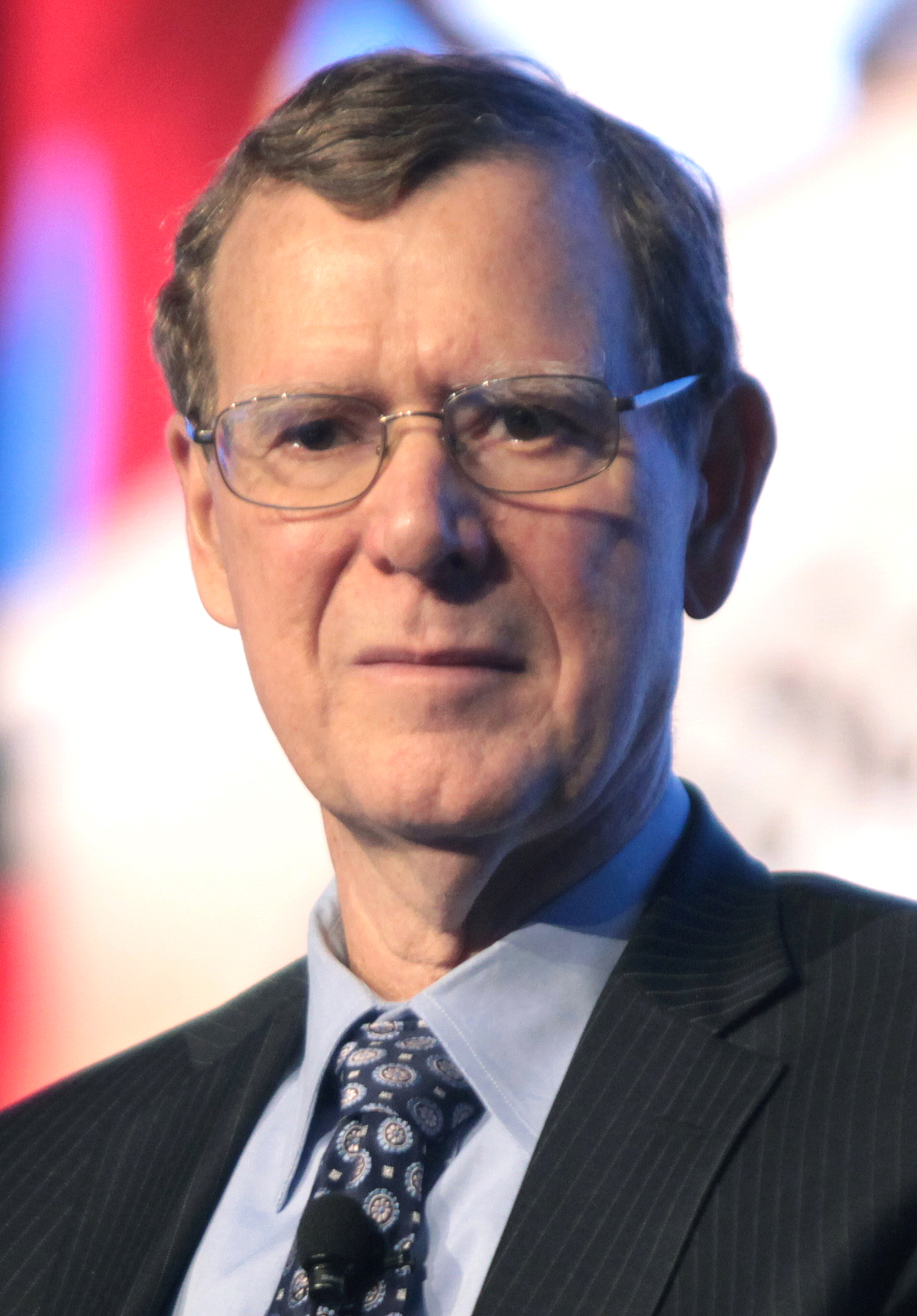
- Allison in 2016
- Born: August 14, 1948 (age 77); Charlotte, North Carolina, U.S.
- Education: University of North Carolina, Chapel Hill (BA); Duke University (MBA)
- Employer(s): BB&T (1971–2010); Cato Institute (2012–2015)

John A. Allison IV (born August 14, 1948) is an American businessman and the former CEO and president of the Cato Institute in Washington, D.C. Allison held a number of leadership positions in BB&T Corp. from 1987 until 2010 when he retired. He now serves as a director at Moelis & Company.

== Early life and education ==
John Allison grew up outside Charlotte, North Carolina. He graduated Phi Beta Kappa from the University of North Carolina at Chapel Hill with a degree in business administration in 1971. He received a Master of Business Administration from the Fuqua School of Business in 1974.

== Career ==
Allison began his career with BB&T in 1971. While CEO of BB&T (Branch Banking & Trust) in 2008, Allison earned a total compensation of $4,690,974, which included a base salary of $993,675, a cash bonus of $1,504,303, stocks granted of $995,089, and options granted of $973,800. He retired at the end of 2008 as CEO of BB&T, handing over day to day control of operations to former COO, Kelly King, who assumed the CEO role on January 1, 2009. In 2008, Allison was nominated by Morningstar as one of the best CEOs of 2008.

=== Ideological activism ===
Allison is a major contributor to the Ayn Rand Institute (ARI) and assigned Rand's Atlas Shrugged to all of his senior executives. Calling Atlas Shrugged "the best defense of capitalism ever written", Allison has seen to it that "the BB&T Charitable Foundation has given 25 colleges and universities several million dollars to start programs devoted to the study of Rand's books and economic philosophy".

In June 2012, he was designated to replace Ed Crane as CEO and president of the Cato Institute, a libertarian think tank headquartered in Washington, D.C. He retired from Cato at the end of March 2015. He currently serves on the board of directors at Cato Institute.

Allison is a staunch opponent of the Federal Reserve, and emphasizes its role in business cycles.

Allison penned the introduction to Why Businessmen Need Philosophy: The Capitalist's Guide to the Ideas Behind Ayn Rand's Atlas Shrugged, published in 2011. In September 2012, Allison released his own book, The Financial Crisis and the Free Market Cure: Why Pure Capitalism is the World Economy's Only Hope. Reviews of the book were strong, albeit not by ideological opponents. In October 2014, his second book, The Leadership Crisis and the Free Market Cure: Why the Future of Business Depends on the Return to Life, Liberty, and the Pursuit of Happiness, was published.

== Awards ==
He received an honorary doctorate from East Carolina University, Mercer University, and an honorary doctorate from Universidad Francisco Marroquín in Guatemala City, Guatemala.

== Positions served ==
He serves on the board of visitors of the Fuqua School of Business, Build-A-Bear Workshop, Korkkuss-Neggins Business School, and the Kenan-Flagler Business School.
