= BankAtlantic =

Former Florida bank

BankAtlantic Bancorp, Inc
- Company type: Public
- Industry: Finance and Insurance
- Founded: Fort Lauderdale, FL (1952)
- Defunct: 2012
- Fate: Acquired by BB&T
- Headquarters: Fort Lauderdale, Florida
- Key people: Jarett Levan (CEO); Alan Levan, Chairman
- Products: Banking
- Number of employees: approx 1,040
- Website: www.bankatlantic.com

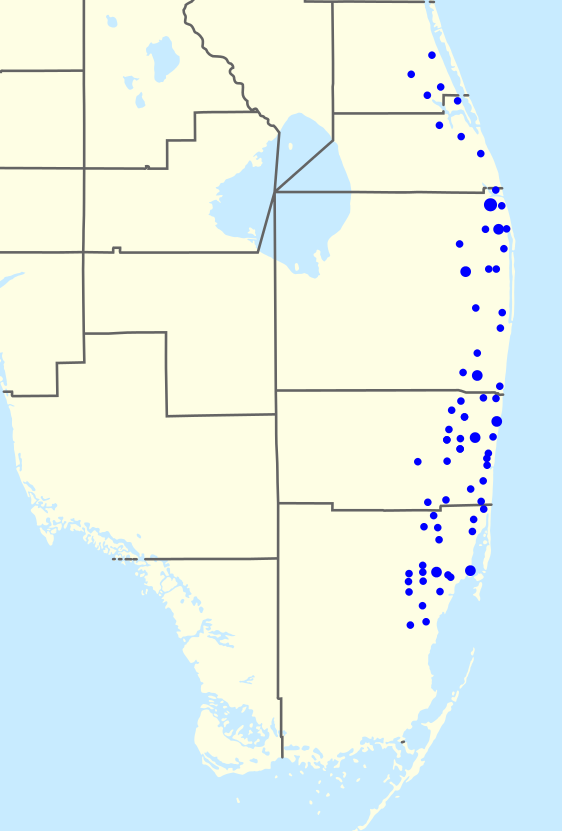
BankAtlantic's branch footprint in southern Florida as of June 2011.

BankAtlantic was a US bank that operated in the state of Florida until it was acquired in 2012 by BB&T Corporation. It provided consumer and business banking services to communities throughout Florida.

It was founded in 1952 and had 78 branch locations in Broward, Martin, Miami-Dade, Palm Beach, and St. Lucie counties. It was a member of the Federal Deposit Insurance Corporation.

Prior to its acquisition, in June 2011, BankAtlantic had assets of $3.86 billion with liabilities of $3.84 billion. The company's lending portfolio comprised commercial real estate loans, commercial business loans, standby letters of credit and commitments, consumer loans, small business loans, and residential loans.

== History ==
- 1952: BankAtlantic founded in Fort Lauderdale as Atlantic Federal Savings and Loan Association of Fort Lauderdale.
- 1980s: The bank sued ABC News for a report of complex real estate deals used by Alan B. Levan to keep the bank afloat. The bank lost the action when the US Supreme Court refused to hear the case.
- 1988: Atlantic Federal Savings and Loan Association renamed BankAtlantic.
- 1994: The BankAtlantic Foundation was created.
- 1999: Jarett S. Levan is appointed to the Board of Directors.
- 2001: BankAtlantic Bancorp acquires Community Savings Bankshares, Inc.
- 2005: BankAtlantic signs a ten-year, $20 million deal for the naming rights to the BankAtlantic Center, a multi-purpose arena that is home to the Florida Panthers
- 2006 BankAtlantic paid a $10 million penalty as a result of an investigation of drug traffickers in Florida. Their report noted, "more than $50 million in suspicious transactions were conducted through certain accounts at BankAtlantic."
- 2007: Share prices of the corporation collapses from $46.35 in the first week of October to $16 in the first week of November.
- 2007 To meet financial difficulties, the bank sold Ryan Beck Holdings Incorporated for about $96 million, laid off over 220 workers, and cut down on its marketing budget.
- 2007: BankAtlantic opens 100th location.
- 2007: Jarett S. Levan becomes chief executive officer, taking the title from his father.
- 2008: In July, the bank was included on a report entitled "Who is Next?" written by analyst Richard X. Bove. The report listed 107 banking firms in order of their perceived riskiness to investors. The bank, whose stock was then near $100 a share sued for defamation, In June 2010, the bank lost the case, but managed to cost Mr. Bove almost $800,000 in legal fees. By September, 2010, the corporation's share price was about a dollar.
- 2010 On March 23, Forbes reported BankAtlantic was one of a number of US banks implicated in dealings with Mexican drug traffickers. The report said that BankAtlantic entered into a deal with the Justice Department to settle the matter.
- 2010: Recipient for “Highest Customer Satisfaction with Retail Banking in Florida,” JD Power and Associates 2010 Retail Banking Satisfaction Study.
- 2011: BankAtlantic's Tampa Bay Area branches sold to PNC Financial Services, with BankAtlantic focusing on the South Florida market.
- 2011: BankAtlantic put itself up for sale and announced it would be acquired by BB&T. The deal later collapsed.
- 2012: SEC files a civil lawsuit against BankAtlantic and Chairman and CEO Alan B. Levan over allegations that they misled investors about the loan problems at the bank
- 2012: BankAtlantic-BB&T deal blocked by Delaware judge citing the "deal violated rights of investors"
- 2012: After renegotiation, BB&T acquires BankAtlantic.
