= Main Street Bank =

Main Street Banks, Inc.
- Industry: Banking
- Founded: 1901; 125 years ago
- Defunct: 2006; 20 years ago
- Fate: Acquired by BB&T
- Headquarters: Atlanta, Georgia
- Key people: Samuel B. Hay, III, CEO; David Brooks, CFO
- Revenue: ▲$0.144 billion (2005)
- Net income: ▲$0.029 billion (2005)
- Total assets: ▲$2.350 billion (2005)
- Total equity: ▲$0.295 billion (2005)
- Number of employees: 549

Main Street Banks was a bank based in Atlanta, Georgia. In 2006, it was acquired by BB&T. The bank operated 24 branches.

== History ==
The bank was founded in 1901 as The Bank of Covington.

In 1996, the bank was renamed Main Street Banks.

In December 2002, the company acquired First National Bank of Johns Creek for $26.2 million.

In May 2003, the company acquired First Colony Bancshares Inc. for $96 million.

In June 2004, the bank laid off 37 employees.

In June 2006, the bank was acquired by BB&T for $599 million in stock.
