= National Penn =

American financial services corporation

- Company type: Public
- Industry: Financial services
- Founded: 1874; 152 years ago
- Defunct: 2015; 11 years ago
- Fate: Acquired by BB&T
- Headquarters: Allentown, Pennsylvania, U.S.
- Area served: Pennsylvania, Maryland, New Jersey
- Key people: Scott Fainor (President & CEO); Michael J. Hughes (Senior EVP & CFO)
- Total assets: $9.6 billion (2015)

National Penn Bancshares, Inc. (referred to as National Penn or NatPenn) was an American financial services corporation, with assets (as of April 14, 2015) of approximately $9.6 billion. National Penn operations include a regional banking franchise operating primarily in three states with more than 130 branches, as well as online and mobile services. It also operated a trust company (National Penn Investors Trust Company) and a wealth management division (National Penn Wealth Management).

By assets, National Penn is the seventy-second largest bank in the United States, and the fifth largest bank headquartered in Pennsylvania. National Penn is based in Allentown. National Penn trades on NASDAQ under the symbol NPBC. In August 2015, it was announced National Penn had been acquired by BB&T.

== History ==
National Penn was founded in 1874 as The National Bank of Boyertown. The company went public in 1982, and changed its name to National Penn in 1993. The bank has completed twelve acquisitions since 1990, and terminated one. By 2015, National Penn had grown into 124 branches in Pennsylvania, New Jersey and Maryland, and the bank had $9.6 billion in assets.

In the spring of 2014, National Penn moved its headquarters to downtown Allentown, consolidating their facilities in one location. In August 2015, it was announced National Penn had been acquired by BB&T, which was expanding its presence in the mid-Atlantic states. National Penn CEO Scott Fainor said the deal was practical because BB&T could offer customers a wider range of products and services, such as deposit, loan and insurance offerings. Additionally, he said, new federal banking compliance rules would have cost National Penn millions of dollars annually. The merger is expected to close by mid-2016. BB&T seeks to achieve cost savings of about 30 percent of National Penn's non-interest expenses, totaling $65 million. As a result, job cuts are expected.

== Charitable efforts ==
National Penn donated a new police headquarters for the Boyertown Police Department in 2015.
