= BB&T Financial Center =

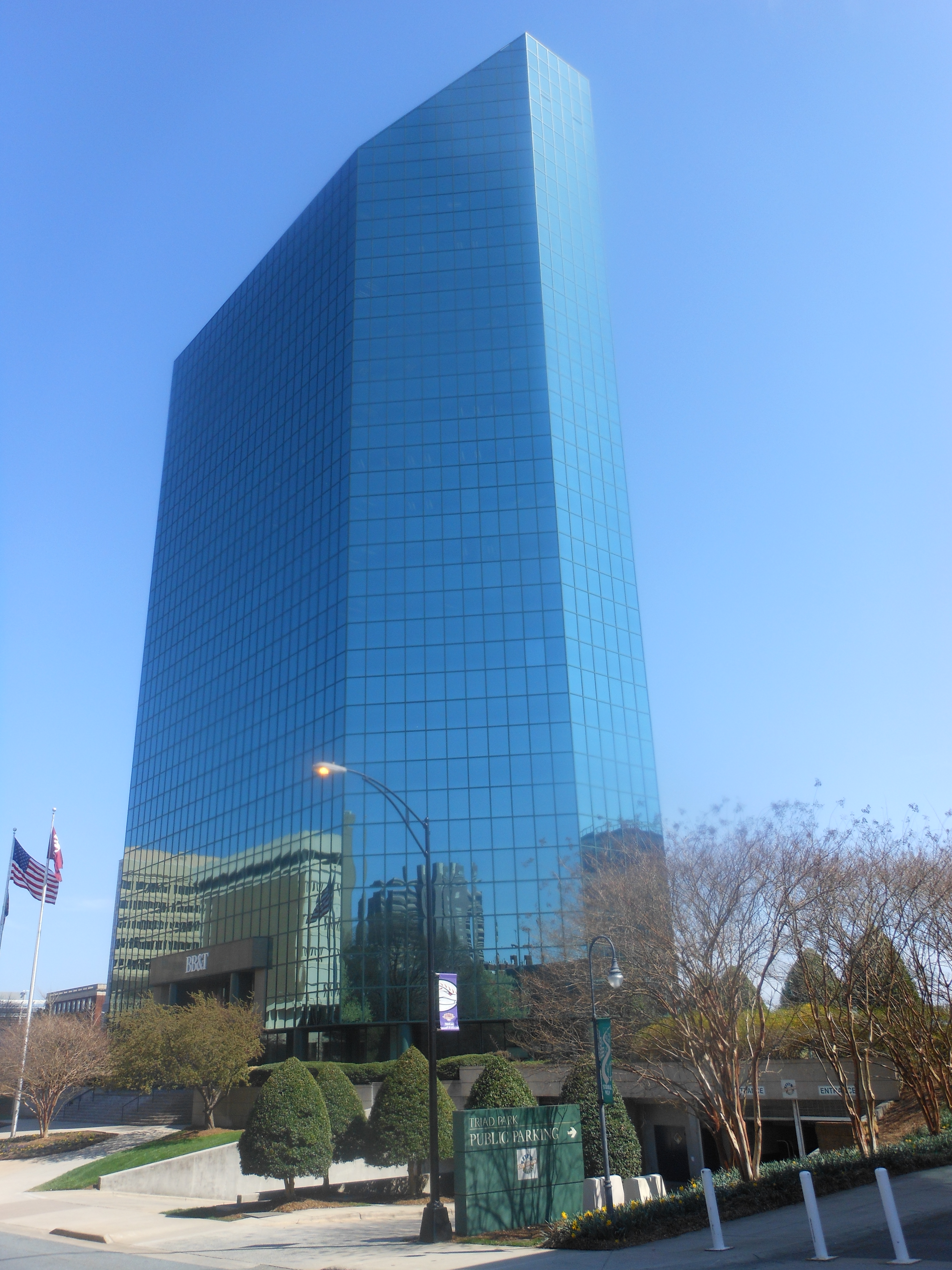
- BB&T Financial Center

- Location within North Carolina

General information
- Status: Completed
- Type: Office
- Location: 200 W. 2nd Street; Winston-Salem, North Carolina, United States
- Coordinates: 36.0956°N 80.2473°W
- Completed: 1987

Height
- Roof: 340 feet (100 m)
- Top floor: 264 feet (80 m)

Technical details
- Floor count: 21

Design and construction
- Architecture firm: Hammill-Walter Associates; Sherman Carter Barnhart (consulting)

BB&T Financial Center is a 340-foot (100 m) postmodern green glass and steel skyscraper at 200 West 2nd Street and is the 5th tallest building in Winston-Salem, Forsyth County, North Carolina, United States with 271,445 square feet (25,218.1 m^{2}) of space. It was completed in 1987 and has 21 floors. It served as the headquarters of BB&T from the merger of BB&T and Southern National Bank in 1995. The 19th floor has The Piedmont Club, with 13,232 square feet (1,229.3 m^{2}).

== History ==
One Triad Park was completed in 1987 at a cost of $24 million. Aetna Life Insurance Co. bought the building in 1991 for $10.1 million after foreclosure when previous owners could not pay a $26 million loan.

In the early 1990s, Southern National Bank was expanding and, although the headquarters stayed in Lumberton, North Carolina, the bank moved some operations to Winston-Salem. One Triad Park had 74,000 square feet (6,900 m^{2}) of space Southern National could move into immediately. In 1993, with Southern National taking 80,000 square feet (7,400 m^{2}) on eight floors, the building's name changed to Southern National Financial Center on May 3.

On August 1, 1994, BB&T and Southern National announced a "merger of equals". The merged bank would be called BB&T, though at first, the holding company remained Southern National. The headquarters became BB&T Financial Center. Southern National Corp. changed its name to BB&T Corp. in May 1997. Womble Carlyle Sandridge & Rice was another major tenant.

Parkway Properties Inc. of Jackson, Mississippi bought the building in 1996 for $25.5 million. Parkway sold the building to Cabot Investment Properties for $27 million in August 2003. Parkway Realty Services, a Parkway subsidiary, continued to manage the building. BB&T had 201,006 square feet (18,674.1 m^{2}) as of 2002, and the Class A building was 97.5 percent occupied.

In December 2011, Inland Private Capital Corp. of Oak Brook, Illinois bought BB&T Financial Center for $34.1 million. BB&T occupied 94 percent of the building, still considered Class A.

In late 2014, investors bought BB&T Financial Center for $60 million, the most anyone ever paid per square foot for office space in the city, and nearly $26 million more than the tax value at the time. As of April, 2022, the tax value on the building was $30.2 million, nearly $30 million below purchase price.

After BB&T became Truist Financial in 2019, the company moved its headquarters to Truist Center in Charlotte, leaving the community/retail hub in Winston-Salem. Except for a branch office, all Truist employees were moving to other locations in the city. It has been mostly empty ever since.

== Ownership ==
On October 18, 2018, one of the building's co-owners, Tyson "Ty" Rhame, was convicted by the Northern District of Georgia on 11 counts of mail and wire fraud conspiracy, and multiple counts of mail and wire fraud. The building has been a forfeiture target by the U.S. Government since March 2016, and a hearing was set for May 23, 2022 to determine the outcome.

At a September 2026 auction, the winning bid was $3.9 million. RealInsight, which took receivership in 2024, did not say who submitted the bid. Unless a major anchor tenant moved in, the building appeared likely to be mixed-use, a hotel, or residential.
