= Winston Tower =

Historic building in North Carolina, USA

- Wachovia Building
- U.S. National Register of Historic Places
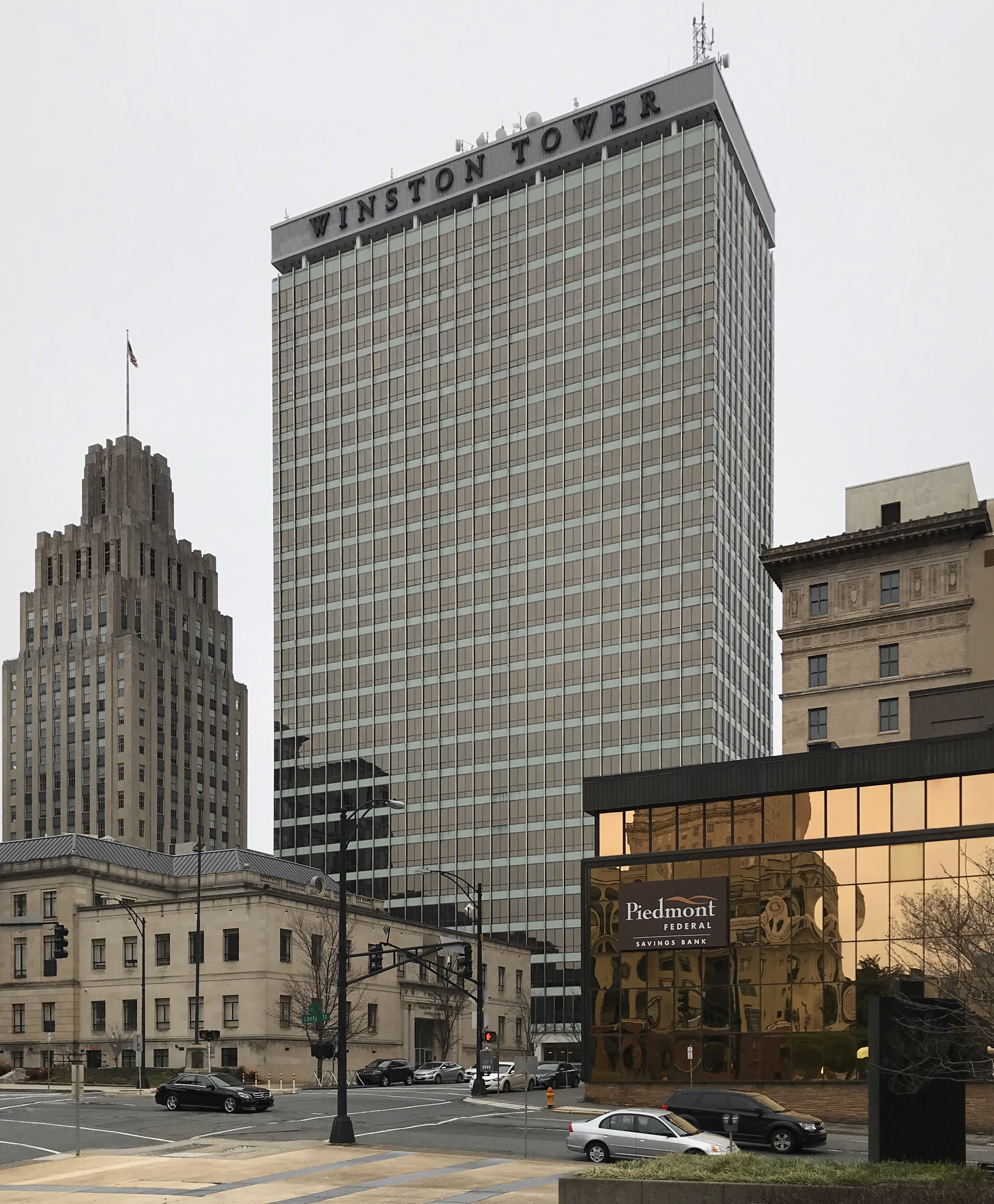
- Winston Tower, February 2020

- Location within North Carolina Location within the United States
- Location: 301 N. Main St., Winston-Salem, North Carolina
- Coordinates: 36°5′53″N 80°14′37″W
- Area: less than one acre
- Built: 1963
- Built by: C. P. Street Construction Company
- Architect: Cameron Assoc.; Cameron, Albert B., et al.
- Architectural style: International Style
- NRHP reference No.: 01000376
- Added to NRHP: April 19, 2001

The Winston Tower (formerly Wachovia Building) is a 410 ft (125 m) tall skyscraper in Winston-Salem, Forsyth County, North Carolina, completed in 1966 with 29 floors. It was the tallest building in North Carolina, succeeding the Reynolds Building in Winston-Salem, until it was passed by Charlotte's Jefferson First Union Tower in 1971.

It was listed on the National Register of Historic Places in 2001.

After a 2003 renovation in which all 6,033 windows were replaced with tinted glass to save energy, the building received its current name. It has 436,000 square feet (40,500 square meters) of office space. As of 2009, Winston Tower is the second-tallest office building in the city, behind 100 North Main Street; both have previously served as the corporate headquarters for Wachovia Bank.

On December 10, 2021, Truliant Federal Credit Union confirmed it had acquired naming rights to the tower. The name "Truliant" was scheduled to appear on the east and west sides at the top of the building in April 2022, to mark the credit union's 70th anniversary. The company plans "a small presence in the building."

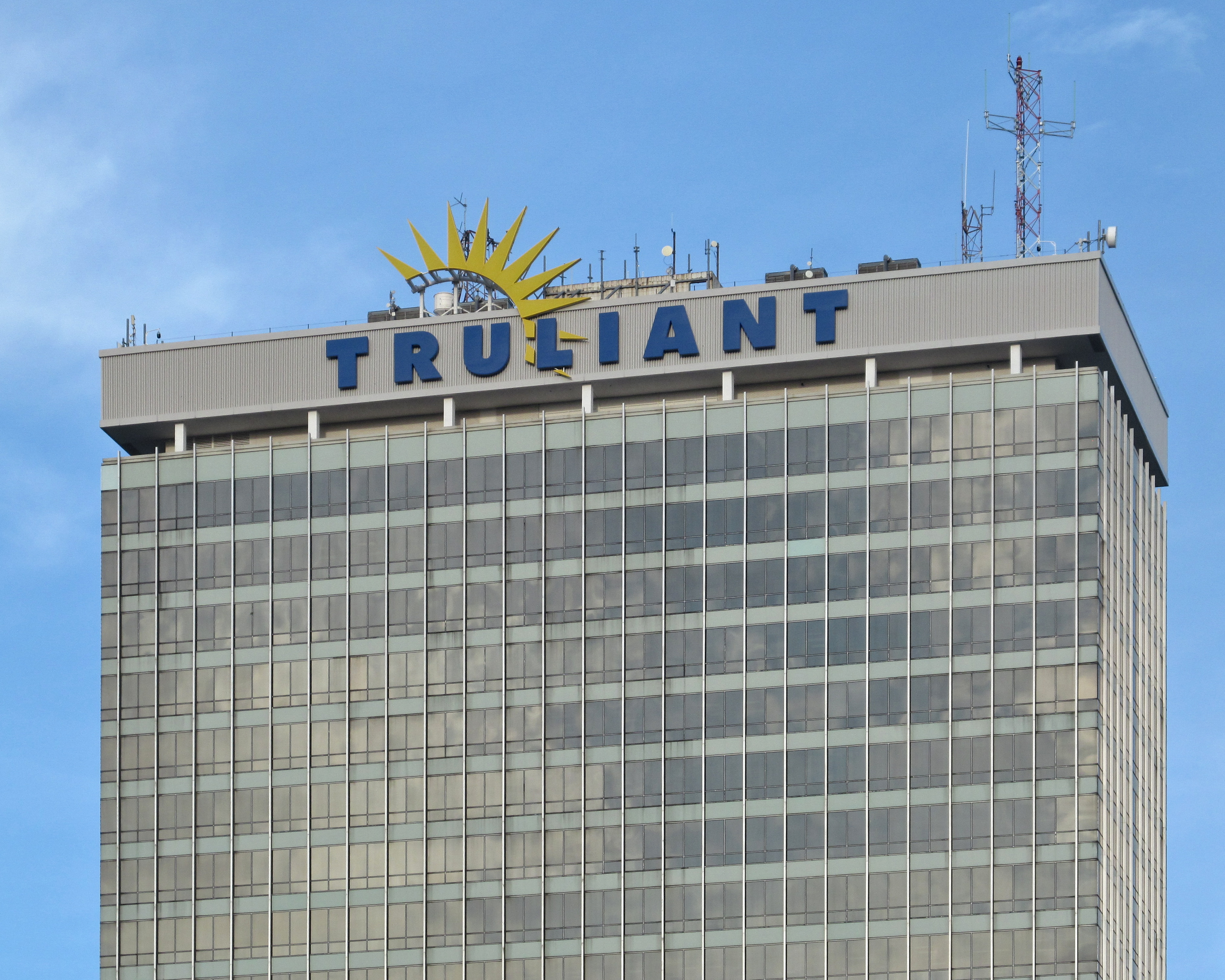
Top of the Winston Tower with Truliant sign

An August 17, 2022, Forsyth County Register of Deeds filing shows that Charlotte-based Winston Tower LLC had purchased the building for $14 million. The company's manager, Jason Tuttle, said 100,000 square feet of space was available and it would be marketed to companies formed in business incubators. Tuttle also said Truliant still planned to put its signs on the building. The company has begun filling that space with tenants, offering a handful of different floor plans. The letters were delayed and were scheduled to be put in place in July 2023.

== See also ==
- List of tallest buildings in Winston-Salem
- List of tallest buildings in North Carolina
