= 100 North Main Street =

Office building in Winston-Salem, North Carolina, U.S.

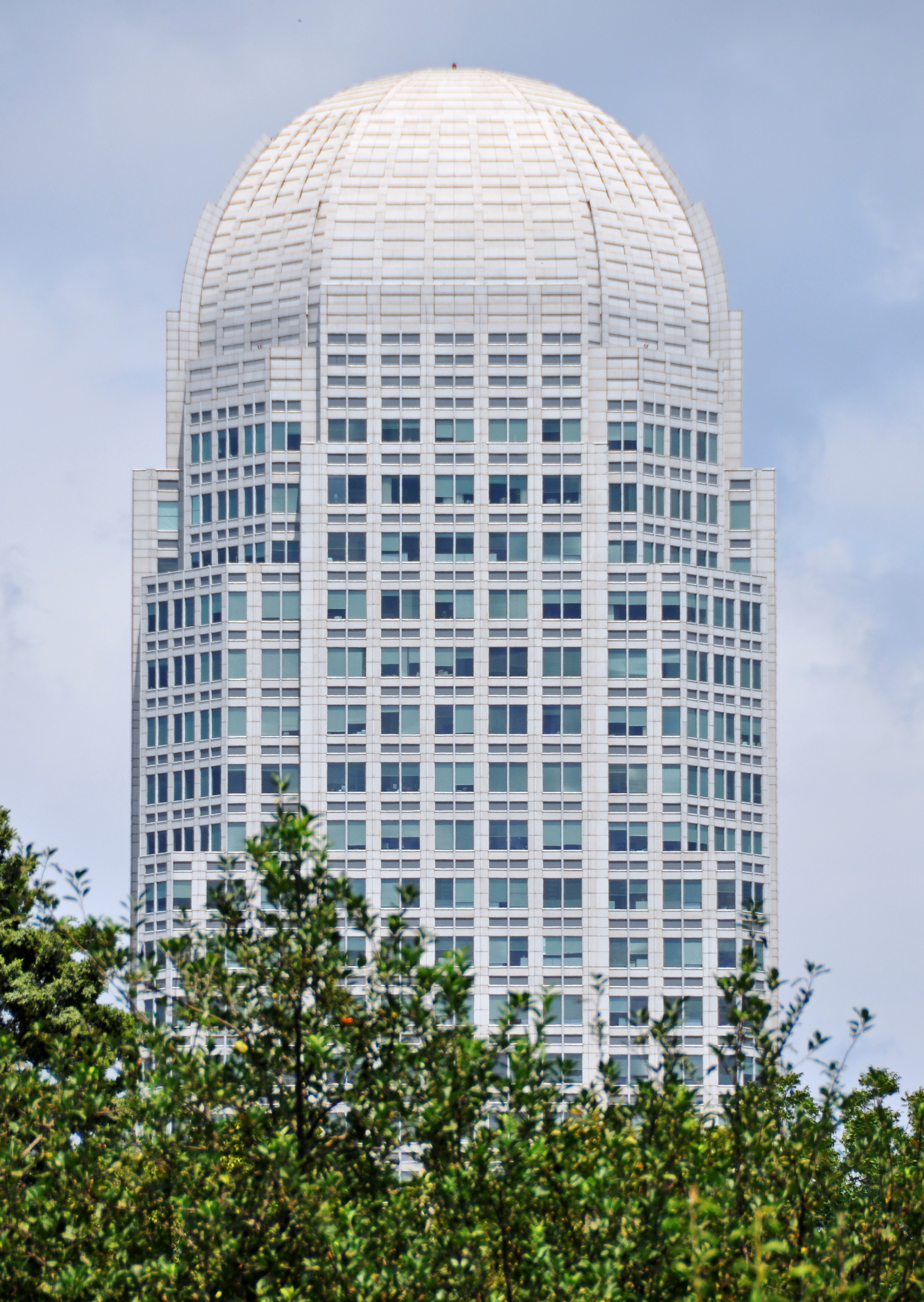
- 100 North Main Street in Winston-Salem, North Carolina

Record height
- Tallest in Winston-Salem since 1995^{[I]}
- Preceded by: Winston Tower

General information
- Type: Office
- Location: 100 N. Main Street; Winston-Salem, North Carolina, U.S.
- Coordinates: 36.095404°N 80.244085°W
- Completed: 1995
- Cost: $80,000,000
- Owner: WFC Property LLC

Height
- Roof: 140.21 m (460 ft)

Technical details
- Floor count: 34
- Floor area: 50,737 m^{2} (546,130 ft^{2})

Design and construction
- Architect: César Pelli
- Main contractor: Holder Construction Company

100 North Main Street, also known as Wells Fargo Center, (or known colloquially as the "Winston Wiener", "Phallus Palace" or "The Penis Building") is a postmodern, 460-foot (140 m), 34-floor office skyscraper in Winston-Salem, North Carolina, United States. Originally named Wachovia Center, the building served as the corporate headquarters of Wachovia bank from 1995, the year of the tower's erection, to 2001, the year the corporation merged with First Union and moved its headquarters to Charlotte, North Carolina. It is the tallest building in the Piedmont Triad region and was the tallest in the Carolinas outside Charlotte until 2008, when RBC Plaza (now PNC Plaza) was completed in Raleigh.

The building was designed by Petronas Towers architect César Pelli and features Moravian architectural themes, which are widely found in Winston-Salem. Notable aspects include the Moravian arch, which was used in the dome's design, and the Moravian star, which was used on the lobby's mosaics. Pelli said the tower design resembled a rosebud about to bloom. It is sheathed in Olympia white granite and is the only granite-domed skyscraper in the world. The granite comes from a single quarry in Sardinia. The dome rises 59 ft (18 m) and houses mechanical equipment. The gardens around the site were designed by Pelli's wife Diana Balmori, a landscape architect. Atlanta-based developer Taylor & Mathis managed the development.

== History ==
The building was erected for Wachovia bank to replace the nearby Wachovia Building (which was renamed Winston Tower) as the corporation's world headquarters. Wachovia Center, as the tower was originally named, surpassed Winston Tower as Winston-Salem's tallest building. The building was erected during a lull in skyscraper construction in the United States and was the tallest building erected in the entire country during the years of 1995 and 1996. The building remained Wachovia's corporate headquarters from its completion date in 1995 to 2001, when Wachovia merged with First Union. Once the merger was finalized, the corporation, which retained the Wachovia name, decided to locate its headquarters at One Wachovia Center in Charlotte, North Carolina. Wachovia subsequently sold Wachovia Center to American Financial Realty Trust in May 2004 for $39.6 million as part of a $546 million deal which included 150 bank properties. Wachovia bank continued to lease space in the tower, mostly for offices of its wealth management division.

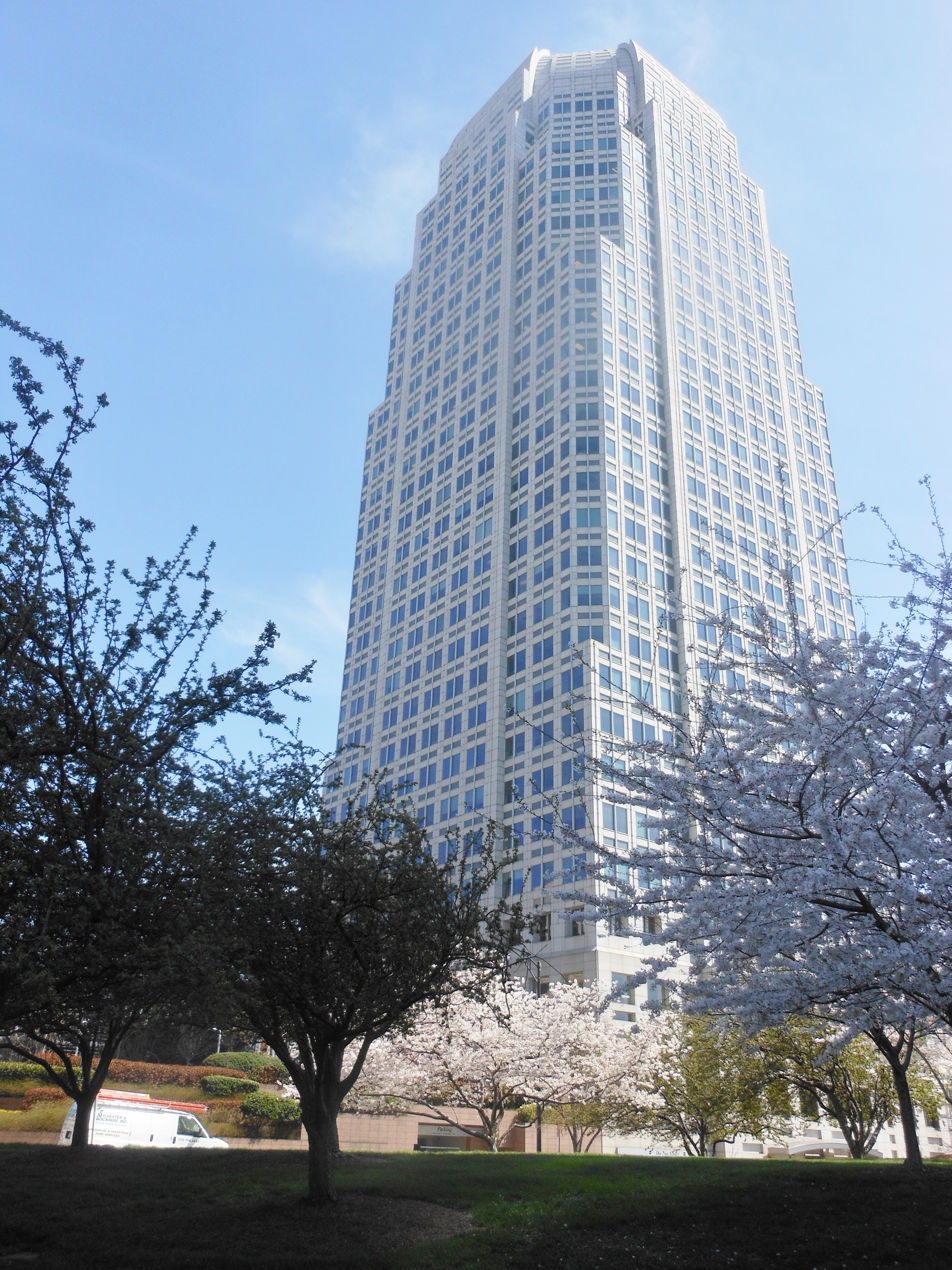
Wells Fargo Center and surrounding landscape

On April 1, 2008, American Financial was bought by Gramercy Capital, which assumed ownership of the building. Gramercy then sold the property to SL Winston-Salem LLC, on October 23, 2008, for $36 million.

Wachovia, which as of 2009 leased seventeen floors of 100 North Main Street, was purchased by Wells Fargo on December 31, 2008, and ceased to exist as a separate company in September 2011. It is uncertain whether Wells Fargo will elect to continue to lease space in the tower in near future, but Bobby Finch, 100 North Main Street's leasing handler, hoped "that the low cost of the lease will be attractive and compelling to Wells Fargo as it evaluates the Winston-Salem and Charlotte operations it is taking over from Wachovia."

Wells Fargo, whose lease continued another thirteen years, occupied 65 percent of the building. Other major tenants included Deutsche Bank Securities, Morgan Stanley Smith Barney, Wake Forest Baptist Medical Center and the U.S. Department of Veterans Affairs.

Linville Team Partners was contracted to lease vacant space, promoting the building as both the Wells Fargo Center, and 100 North Main Street, the building's formal address.

A filing posted October 15, 2018, showed that WFC Property LLC of Oklahoma City purchased the building for $62 million.

== See also ==
- List of tallest buildings in Winston-Salem
- List of tallest buildings in North Carolina
