= BB&T =

American financial company (1872–2019)

BB&T Corporation

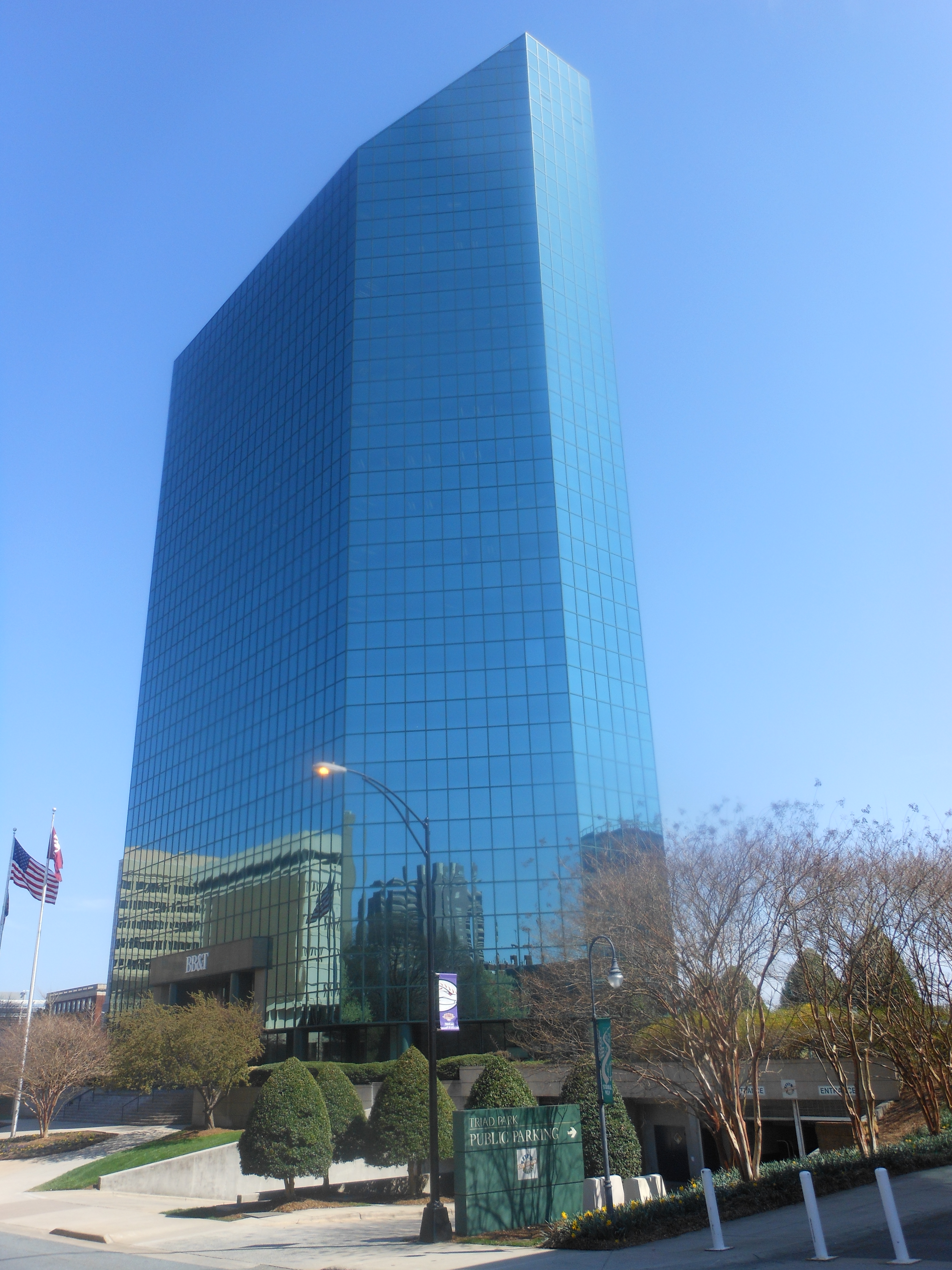
- The BB&T Financial Center, the former headquarters of BB&T.
- Type: Defunct
- Industry: Banking
- Founded: 1872; 154 years ago
- Founders: Alpheus Branch; Thomas Jefferson Hadley
- Defunct: December 6, 2019; 6 years ago (as an independent corporation); February 18, 2022; 4 years ago (as a brand)
- Fate: Merged with SunTrust to form Truist
- Successor: Truist
- Headquarters: Wilson, North Carolina (1872–1995); BB&T Financial Center; Winston-Salem, North Carolina (1995–2019)
- Number of locations: 1,791 branches (2019)
- Key people: Kelly King; Chairman and CEO
- Products: Commercial and Consumer banking Investment banking Insurance; Mortgage
- Website: Archived official website at the Wayback Machine (archive index)

BB&T Corporation (formerly the Branch Banking and Trust Company) was an American banking and financial services firms based in Winston-Salem, North Carolina. Founded in 1872, it grew to become one of the largest banks in the United States in the 20th century. In 2019, BB&T merged with Atlanta-based SunTrust to form Truist, which retains BB&T's stock price history and operates under BB&T's charter.

== History ==
=== Early History ===
In 1872, Alpheus Branch and Thomas Jefferson Hadley founded the Branch and Hadley merchant bank in their hometown of Wilson, North Carolina. After many transactions, mostly with local farmers, Branch bought out Hadley's shares in 1887 and renamed the company Branch and Company, Bankers. During that same year, the bank also moved to its new headquarters on Nash Street in downtown Wilson, North Carolina. Two years later, Branch, his father-in-law Gen. Joshua Barnes, Hadley, and three other men secured a charter from the North Carolina General Assembly to operate the Wilson Banking and Trust Company. After many more name changes, the company finally settled on the name Branch Banking and Trust Company. Branch remained an active member of the company until his death in 1893. The 1903 Branch Banking and Trust Company Building at Wilson was listed on the National Register of Historic Places in 1978.

BB&T sold Liberty Bonds during World War I and grew to have more than $4 million in assets by 1923. BB&T Insurance Services was added in 1922 and a mortgage division was added in 1923. Even though banks across the United States failed as a result of the 1929 Stock Market Crash, BB&T survived; it was the only one to do so in the town of Wilson. Up until 2008, the CEO was John A. Allison IV.

=== History of Southern National Bank ===
In 1897, the Bank of Lumberton was started by Angus Mclean in Lumberton, North Carolina, the predecessor of Southern National. The founding board members of the bank were Angus Mclean, Thomas McNeill, R. D. Caswell, C. B. Townsend, S. A. Edmund, R. L. Steele, W. L. F. Steel, T. C. Guthrie, and H. B. Jennings. The board was composed of members from Lumberton, Rockingham, North Carolina, and Bennettsville, South Carolina. Thomas McNeill was selected to be the bank's first president. He resigned a year later, when he was appointed as a judge. After McNeill resigned Mclean became president. Mclean did not simply view himself as a banker, he wanted to build companies that had a good return on their investment, created jobs, and benefited the communities they operated within. In 1955 Hector MacLean, Angus Mclean's son, was named president. The Bank of Lumberton changed its name to Southern National Bank in 1959.

In 1979, the Carolina State Bank of Gastonia, started in 1971, became part of Southern National. In 1982, Southern National took over Winston-Salem-based Forsyth Bank & Trust, led by Glenn Orr. In 1985, Southern National had assets of $1.5 billion. With the purchase of a former Northwestern Bank branch in Hickory, which had to be sold after the First Union-Northwestern merger, Southern National had 99 branches in 26 counties. In 1986, Southern National Corporation entered South Carolina with the $10 million purchase of Horry County National Bank of Loris. Later that year, Southern National announced the $5.6 million purchase of First Palmetto Bancshares Corp. of Columbia and the $9.75 million purchase of Capital Bank and Trust Co. of Belton. At the time, Southern National was North Carolina's seventh-largest banking company. Also in 1986, Southern National sold its Southern National Mortgage Co. to NCNB for an estimated $7 million. Southern National had not intended to sell the business but NCNB made a good offer, and the bank could use the money for its South Carolina purchases. NCNB had exited the mortgage business in 1981 to concentrate on interstate banking, though NCNB bought Bank of North Carolina in 1982 and sold that bank's mortgages to Southern National. In May 1989, Southern National announced its purchase of Allied Bankshares Inc. of Thomson, Georgia. The $59 million deal fell apart but would have been the first acquisition of a Georgia bank by a mid-sized N.C. bank. Another failed deal in 1990 would have given Southern National $1 billion in South Carolina assets and 53 offices in the state. NBSC had $540 million in assets, while Southern National Corp. had $3.4 billion and was N.C.'s fifth largest bank holding company. NBSC shareholders objected to the $53 million deal.

In 1990, Hector MacLean retired from the bank. During his presidency, the bank changed its name, grew from $3 million in assets to $3.3 billion, and grew to 148 branches. MacLean's successor was Glenn Orr. Early in 1993, Southern National completed its purchase of First Federal Savings Bank in Winston-Salem, putting Southern National behind only Wachovia in Forsyth County deposits. Southern National had $4.5 billion in assets, $3.9 billion of those in North Carolina, and was the state's sixth largest banking company. The company's North Carolina banking operations began moving to Winston-Salem, though Orr and the corporate headquarters stayed in Lumberton. One reason for the move was the 20-story, 239,000-square-foot (22,200 m^{2}) One Triad Park, which had 74,000 square feet (6,900 m^{2}) of space Southern National could move into immediately. One of the other contenders, Greensboro, would not have a new building ready, and the bank would need a temporary home. With Southern National taking 80,000 square feet (7,400 m^{2}) on eight floors, the building's name changed to Southern National Financial Center on May 3.

Also in 1993, Southern National announced the purchase of Goldsboro-based East Coast Federal Savings Bank, with $256 million in assets, which Orr called "one of the best savings banks in the state." The deal would make Southern National number one in deposits in Fayetteville, the state's fifth-largest banking market. In 1993, Southern National announced the acquisition of First Savings Bank, FSB, headquartered in Greenville, South Carolina. With just over $2 billion in assets, it was the third largest financial institution in South Carolina. Orr, along with BB&T Chairman John Allison, helped facilitate the Southern National BB&T merger.

=== Mergers with Southern National, United Carolina ===
In 1995, the bank merged with Southern National Bank, another bank with roots in the eastern part of the state. This gave BB&T 437 branches in 220 cities in the Carolinas and Virginia. The merged company became Southern National Corp., but all of its banking subsidiaries took the BB&T name. With $19 billion in assets, BB&T had the most North Carolina deposits and branches of any bank. Southern National head Glenn Orr and new BB&T chairman John Allison said the merger likely created a bank that would be too rich to be taken over by an out-of-state bank. Orr retired once the merger was complete. The headquarters became BB&T Financial Center in Winston-Salem, North Carolina. The holding company was initially named "Southern National Corp" but the BB&T name replaced "Southern National" everywhere from 1997.

In 1997, Southern National Corp. took over United Carolina Bank, another eastern North Carolina–based bank, in a $985 million deal announced in November 1996. UCB had $4.5 billion in assets. 400 employees worked in Whiteville but despite losing the headquarters, the town would eventually have 500 BB&T employees working at a 250-employee call center and other operations. Starting September 22, 1997, 91 UCB branches began the process of changing to BB&T, and 67 other branches of the two banks closed starting in October because they were close to other BB&T locations.

On May 19, 1997, Southern National Corporation changed its name to BB&T Corporation and its stock symbol SN to BBT.

=== Later Acquisitions ===
The bank continued to expand nationwide through the 1990s, purchasing Fidelity Financial Bankshares, First Financial of Petersburg, Maryland, Maryland Federal Bancorp, and Franklin Bancorporation. In 1998, BB&T acquired MainStreet Financial of Martinsville, Virginia, and Mason-Dixon Bancshares of Westminster, Maryland, and further expanded into Georgia and West Virginia after purchasing First Liberty of Macon, Georgia, and Matewan Bancshares.-

In 2000, BB&T purchased One Valley Bancorp, which was itself formed from a combination of community banks throughout West Virginia. This move gave BB&T the largest bank presence in West Virginia. In 2002, BB&T completed its acquisition of MidAmerica Bancorp of Louisville, Kentucky. (Bank of Louisville) and AREA Bancshares Corporation of Owensboro, Kentucky. In 2003, BB&T completed its acquisition of First Virginia Banks of Falls Church, Virginia. In 2005, the bank acquired Main Street Banks of metro Atlanta for $622 million. In 2006, the bank acquired Coastal Federal Bank, based in Myrtle Beach.

In late 2008, the bank accepted $3.1 billion in bailout money through the sale of preferred shares to the U.S. Treasury's Troubled Asset Relief Program. In June 2009, the bank repurchased the shares. In July 2008, the company acquired Puckett, Scheetz & Hogan. In December 2008, the company acquired J. Rolfe Davis. On August 14, 2009, the bank acquired Colonial Bank after its seizure by the FDIC. This acquisition added more than 340 branches in Alabama, Florida, Georgia, Nevada, and Texas, along with approximately $22 billion in assets. BB&T sold the Nevada branches to U.S. Bancorp in January 2010.

The company acquired Atlantic Risk Management. In November 2011, the company acquired Precept, an employee benefits consulting firm. In July 2012, the bank acquired BankAtlantic, and its $2.1 billion in loans and $3.3 billion in deposits. The company also began selling flood insurance online. In December 2013, the bank acquired 21 Citigroup branches in Texas for $36 million, adding $1.2 billion in deposits. In September 2014, the bank acquired 41 more Citigroup branches, adding $2.3 billion in deposits.

In June 2015, the bank acquired Bank of Kentucky for $363 million, which added $1.9 billion in assets and gave BB&T a presence in the Northern Kentucky-Cincinnati market and its first branches in Ohio. In August 2015, the bank acquired Susquehanna Bank for $2.5 billion, adding 240 branches and $18.7 billion in assets, and marking the bank's entry into Pennsylvania and New Jersey. In April 2016, the company acquired Swett & Crawford, a wholesale insurance broker. In April 2016, the bank acquired National Penn for $1.8 billion, which added 124 branches in Pennsylvania, New Jersey, and Maryland, $9.6 billion in assets, and $6.7 billion in deposits. On August 29, 2018, BB&T announced as many as 630 employees would move from its former corporate headquarters on West Nash Street in Wilson to a $35 million, 95,000-square-foot facility on Pine Street. On October 16, 2018, BB&T announced plan to move 500 employees into a 100,000-square-foot, $10 million building in Whiteville

== Insurance Services ==
BB&T has been in the insurance business since 1922. In the late '80s and early '90s the division was losing money. In 1990 Henry William and Wade Reece, a BB&T branch manager, met to discuss how to make the business profitable again. In 1995 the insurance services division made 6 acquisitions of insurance companies based across North Carolina. In July 1999 the insurance services division had acquired 24 insurance companies in North Carolina, 15 in Virginia, 3 in South Carolina, and 1 in Georgia. By 2010 BB&T's insurance division had grown to be the sixth largest broker in the US and the seventh largest in the world with $1 billion in annual revenue. The division has completed 60 mergers since 1999. In 2002 CRC was acquired, whose businesses include specialty and high risk clients. TAPCO and Southern Cross were also acquired and merged into CRC. In February 2008, the division acquired Burkey Risk Services. In April 2008 UnionBanc Insurance Services was acquired. In November 2009, the division acquired Oswald Trippe.

In September 2011 Liberty Benefit Insurance Services, an agency operating in California, was acquired. In February 2012, the division acquired the life insurance, property, and casualty insurance divisions of Crump Group. In March 2014, the Insurance Services division acquired Woodbury & Co., an insurance broker operating in the Carolinas. In April 2014 Caledonian Insurance Group was, a company which specialized in insurance brokerage services for the aviation industry. In April 2015, BB&T subsidiary CRC Insurance Services acquired the assets of Napco LLC, a broker of catastrophic commercial insurance. In the June 2015 acquisition of Bank of Kentucky part of the deal was also American Coastal Insurance which increased BB&T's ownership in AMRisc. In April 2018 the insurance service division announced it was purchasing Regions Insurance Group which was owned by Regions Financial Corporation and the purchase was completed in July 2018. The business was based in Memphis, Tennessee and had offices in 10 states. This acquisition significantly added the insurance division's retail and whole lines of business. The acquisition provided BB&T Insurance Services with 60,000 new clients in multiple states.

== Merger with SunTrust ==
On February 7, 2019, BB&T and Atlanta-based SunTrust announced a merger of equals to create the eighth-largest U.S. bank in the biggest bank deal since the 2008 financial crisis. The bank also announced the move of its headquarters to Charlotte, North Carolina, retaining significant operations in Winston-Salem. It was subsequently announced that the bank's headquarters for community banking will be in Winston-Salem, while Atlanta would be the hub for wholesale / retail banking.

On June 12, BB&T and SunTrust announced Truist Financial Corporation as the name for the merged company. This name resulted from research that included hiring Interbrand, seeking opinions of employees of both banks, and focus groups. The new name drew criticism from analysts and customers of both banks on social media. Five days later, Truliant Federal Credit Union of Winston-Salem filed suit claiming "trademark infringement", complaining of potential confusion between the two companies’ respective names, including Truliant products with "Tru" in their names. The parties agreed to dismiss claims on August 5, 2020, and the lawsuit was closed the next day.

The merger was completed at midnight December 6, 2019. BB&T CEO Kelly King retained the same position with the new company. Customers of both banks were given free access to all of Truist's ATMs free of charge. The merged bank will continue to operate under the BB&T and SunTrust names until the two banks' computer hardware, software and networking systems are streamlined, a process that could take as long as two years. Due to delays related to the COVID-19 pandemic, Truist announced in April 2021 that core conversion to combine the branches would be performed in early 2022. However, on the day the merger closed, SunTrust Bank merged into Branch Banking & Trust Company, forming Truist Bank as the merged company's legal banking entity.

On December 11, 2019, Truist officially exercised its option to purchase Hearst Tower in downtown Charlotte from Cousins Properties. Truist moved its corporate headquarters to Hearst Tower, which was renamed Truist Center. Truist had taken over 550,000 square feet (51,000 m^{2}) of 965,000 square feet (89,700 m^{2}) total. The deal was completed on March 31, 2020; however, due to the COVID-19 pandemic, further actions were delayed.

Truist unveiled its logo in January 2020, with two Ts representing touch and technology, and a shade of purple combining the blue of SunTrust and the burgundy of BB&T. In November 2020, the bank used helicopters to lift up four signs to the top of the former Hearst Tower. The "Truist" wordmark appears on the North Tryon Street and North College Street sides of the building, while the other two sides displayed the Truist logo. This signage has caused a lot controversy, even leading the building's original architect to refer to the signage as vandalism.

In February 2020, Truist launched a nonprofit foundation called the Truist Foundation.

In March 2020, Truist announced it would vacate BB&T Financial Center, its former headquarters building in Winston-Salem, except for a branch office and would move employees in its community/retail hub to other locations in the city, including the Park Building on Cherry Street and two locations on Stratford Road.

== Controversies ==
In 2020, Truist Financial acknowledged and apologized for the company's historic connections to slavery. Kelly King, chairman and chief executive of Truist, issued an employee memo addressing BB&T's slavery ties, but did not mention BB&T's founders Alpheus Branch and Thomas Hadley by name. Prior to the Civil War, Alpheus Branch's father Samuel owned 58 slaves. Thomas Hadley's father owned 37 slaves. The memo stated that "we must consider our own past and acknowledge the role our heritage companies played over 100 years ago to perpetuate the atrocity of slavery and the repression of enslaved people, leading to systemic disadvantages their descendants have endured for generations...We deeply regret and denounce these shameful aspects of our history, both known and unknown." According to the book "Genealogy of American Finance", the economic roots of BB&T can be traced back to 1805, even though BB&T was founded in 1872, nearly a decade after slavery was abolished. Both founders of the bank served in the Confederate Army.

== Naming Rights ==
BB&T had naming rights for various sports venues.

- Truist Financial § Naming rights lists those which changed from "BB&T" to "Truist" after the 2020 merger
- BB&T Center was the 2012–2021 name for what is now Amerant Bank Arena, home of the Florida Panthers hockey team

== Buildings and Branches ==
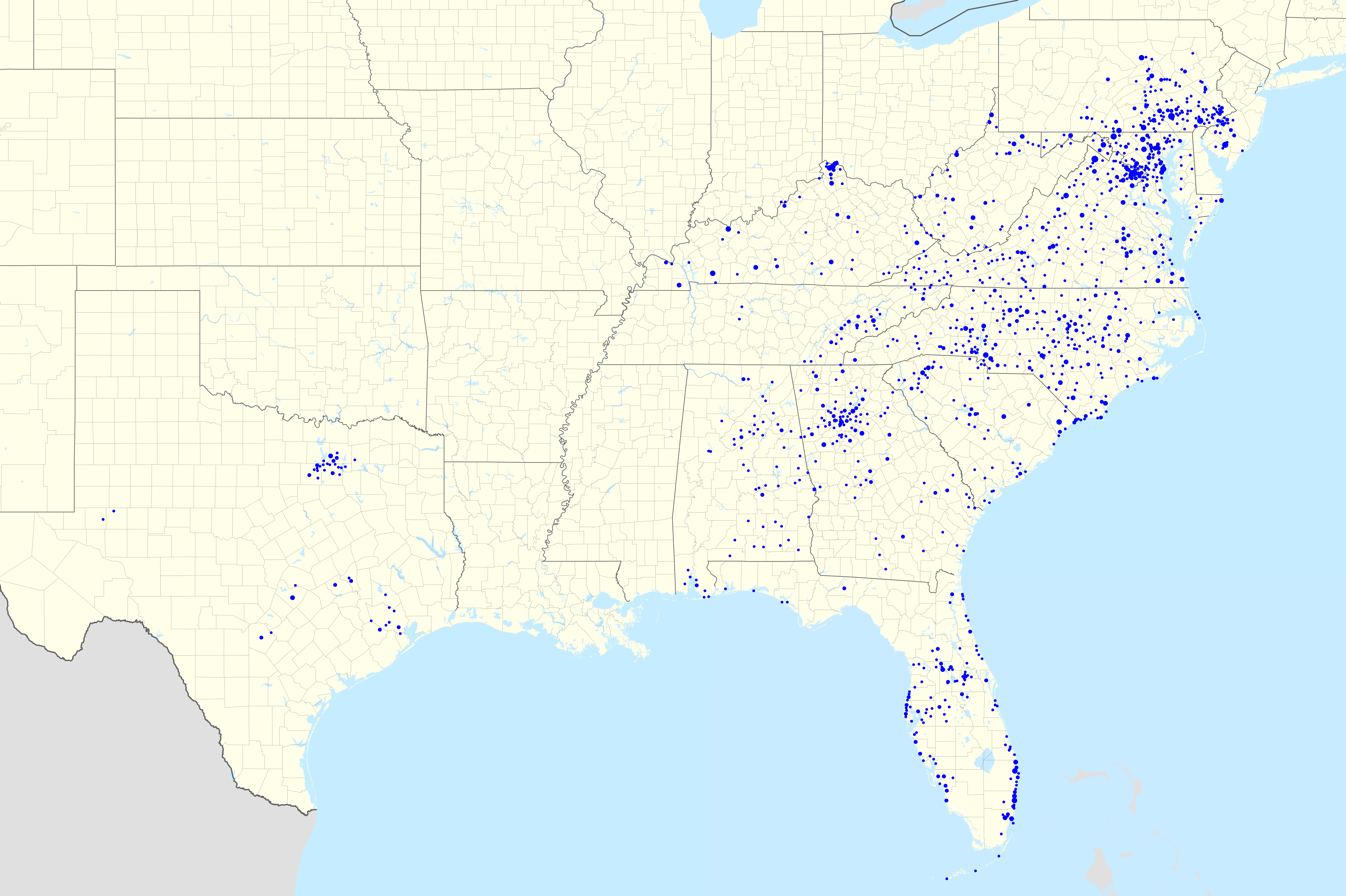
BB&T footprint as of August 2015.

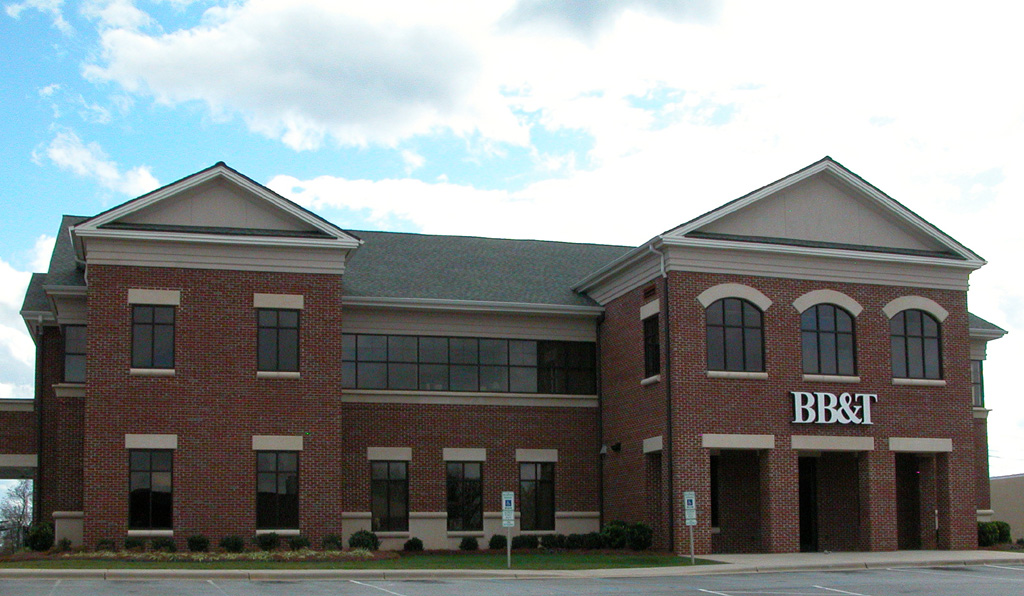
Typical branch office in Lexington, North Carolina

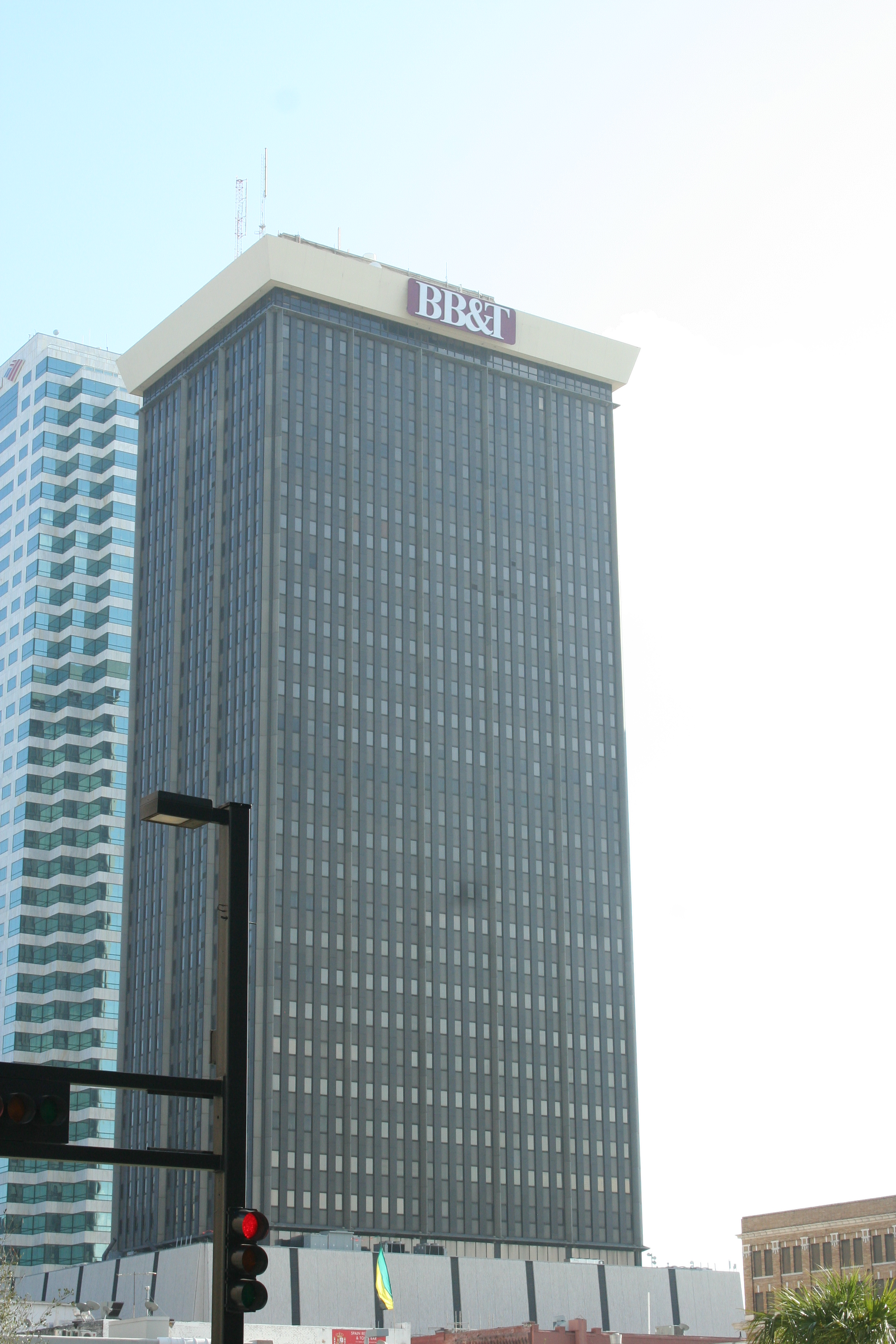
Office building in downtown Tampa, Florida

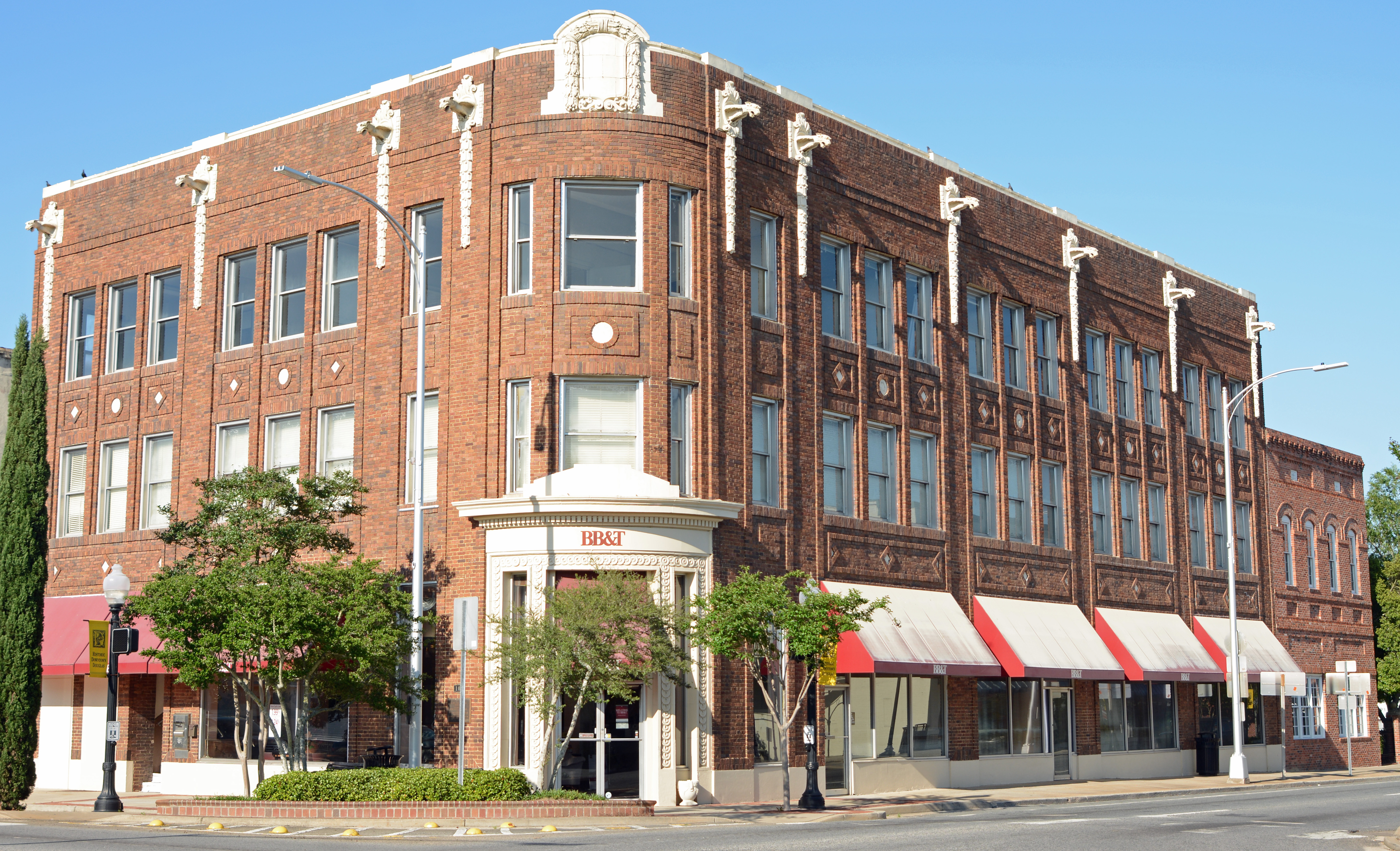
A typical branch in Douglas, Georgia

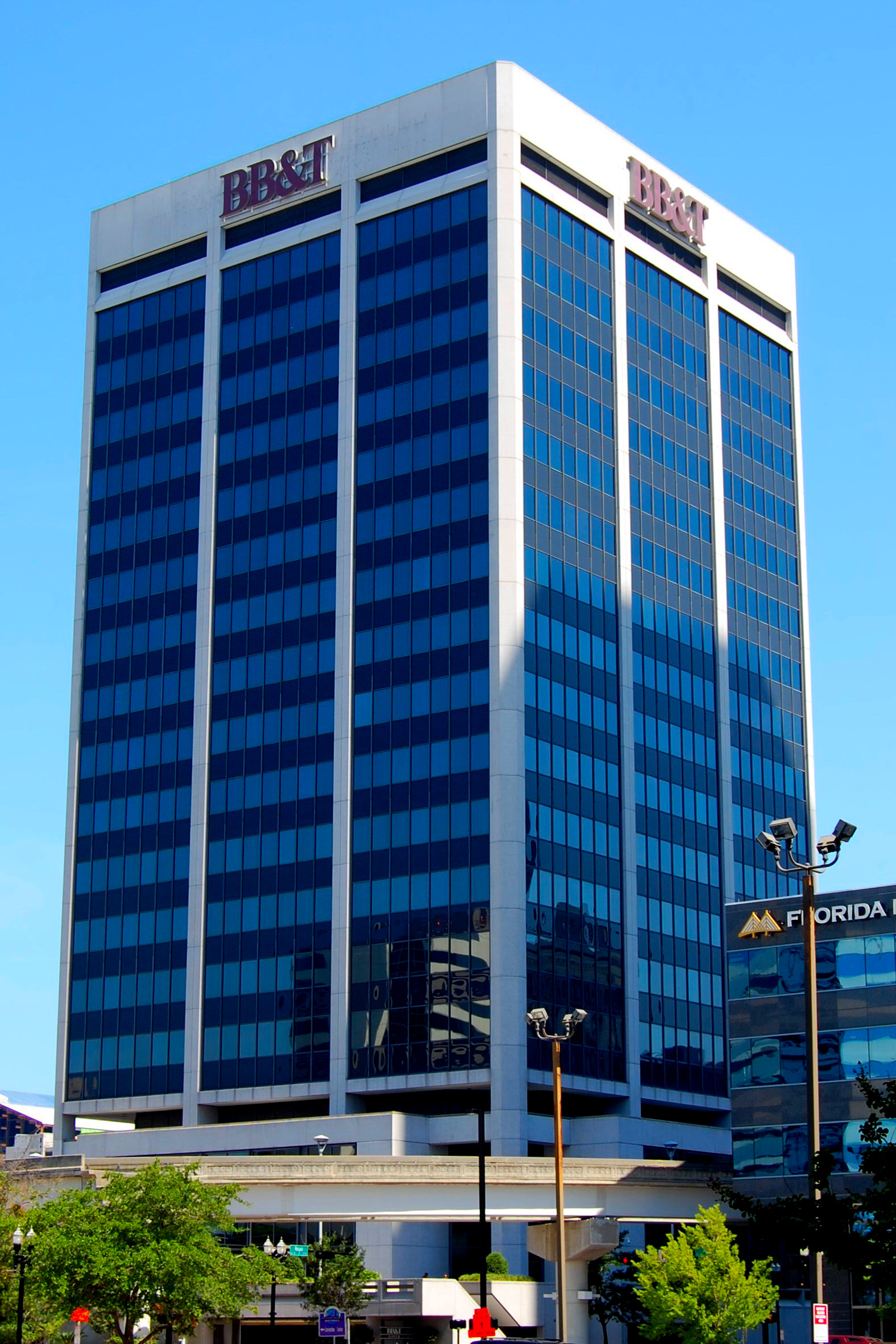
Office building in downtown Jacksonville, Florida

== See also ==
- List of bank mergers in the United States
