= William M. Faulkner =

United States Marine Corps general

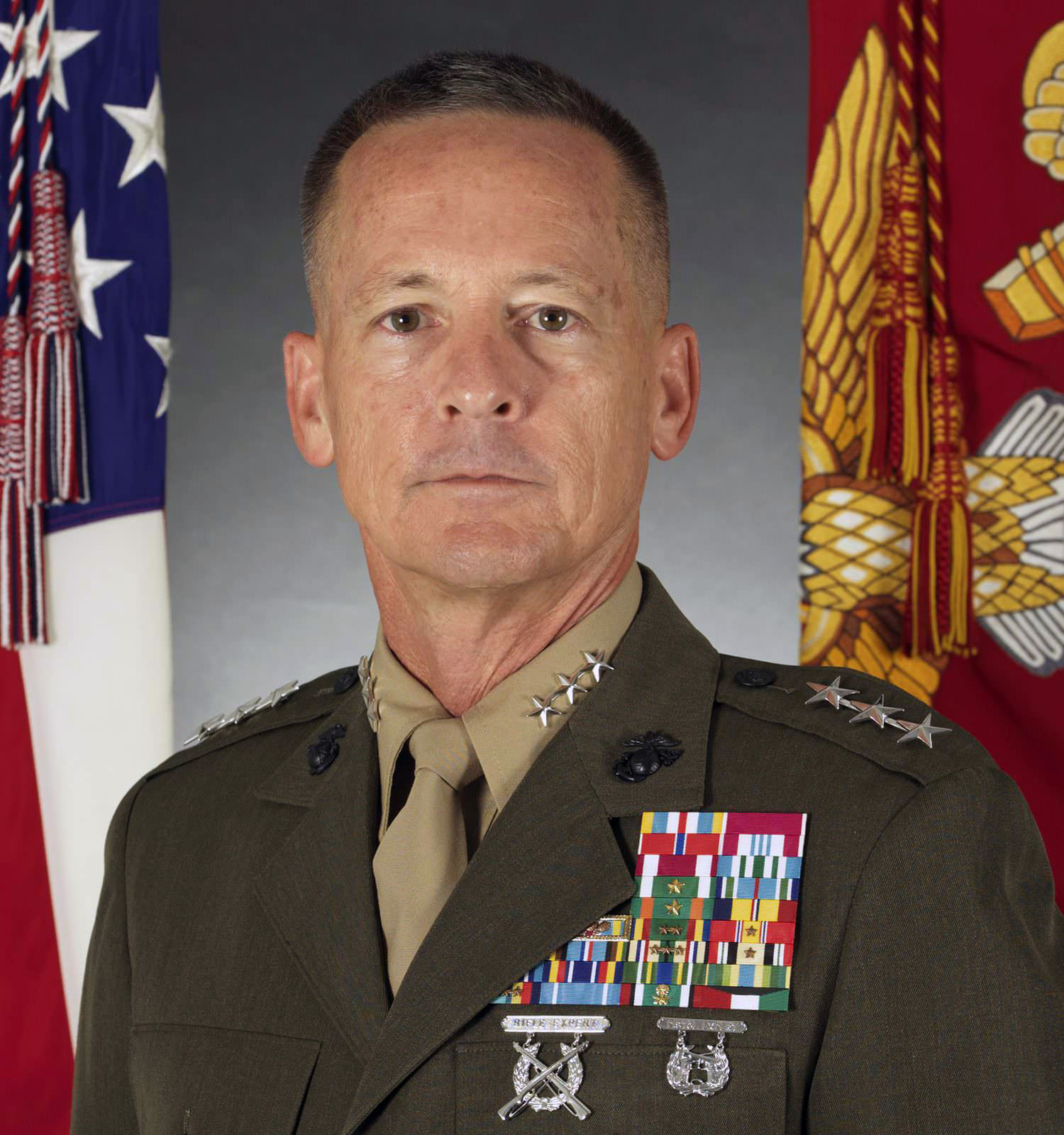
- Military career
- Allegiance: United States
- Branch: United States Marine Corps
- Service years: 1982–2015
- Rank: Lieutenant General
- Commands: Deputy Commandant for Installations and Logistics; MEU Service Support Group 26

William M. Faulkner served as a United States Marine Corps lieutenant general in commands including Deputy Commandant for Installations and Logistics. He retired in 2015.

== Education ==
Faulkner graduated from Havelock High School in Havelock, North Carolina in 1978. He then went on to East Carolina University, where he completed a bachelor of science degree in business in 1982. He holds a master's degree in business from Chaminade University and a master of science degree in National Resource Strategy from the Industrial College of the Armed Forces.

== Military service ==
Following his commissioning in 1982, he has served in a variety of command and staff billets, including in Operation Enduring Freedom as a member of Task Force 58. He was promoted to the rank of lieutenant general on 2 Oct 2012.

Faulkner was commissioned in 1982. Following completion of the Basic School and the Infantry Officer’s Course in 1983, he was assigned to First Battalion, Sixth Marines, where he served as a Rifle and Weapons Platoon Commander, Company Executive Officer, Battalion Adjutant and Assistant S-4 Officer. He was augmented into the regular Marine Corps in 1985 and received a directed lateral move to the logistics occupational field.

From 1986-1989 he served with 1st Marine Expeditionary Brigade as S-4 Officer with Marine Air Base 24 then as Assistant S-4 Officer with Marine Aircraft Group 24. Faulkner was a distinguished graduate from the Amphibious Warfare School in Quantico, Virginia in 1990. From 1990-1992, he served with Brigade Service Support Group 4 as Assistant S-3 Operations Officer, participating in Operation Desert Shield/Desert Storm. He later served as the S-3 Operations Officer and was assigned to the United Nations High Commissioner for Refugees in the former Yugoslavia, where he participated in Operation Provide Promise, coordinating the delivery of humanitarian relief into Bosnia and throughout Serbia.

From 1993-1995, Faulkner was assigned to Headquarters Marine Corps, serving as an action officer in the Logistics Plans, Policies and Strategic Mobility Division of the Installations and Logistics Department. Following Headquarters Marine Corps, he attended Air Command and Staff College in Montgomery Alabama, graduating with distinction in 1997.

From 1997-1999, he was assigned to United States Central Command where he worked in the J4/Logistics Directorate. During this tour, he participated in Operations Southern Watch, Desert Fox and Noble Response. From 2000-2002 he served with 2d Force Service Support Group as the G-3 Current Operations Officer before assuming command of MEU Service Support Group 26, 26th Marine Expeditionary Unit. With the 26th MEU, he deployed to Afghanistan and participated in Operation Enduring Freedom as part of Task Force 58. Faulkner graduated from the Industrial College of the Armed Forces at National Defense University in 2003.

From 2003-2005 he was assigned to the Joint Chiefs of Staff at the Pentagon in the J4 Directorate, where he worked as a Logistics Operations Officer in the National Military Command Center then as Section Head, Logistics Programs and Policy Division. In 2005 he was assigned to 2d Force Service Support Group as the Assistant Chief of Staff G-3. In May 2006 he activated and assumed command of Combat Logistics Regiment 27.

In November 2006 he was assigned duty as the Chief of Staff of 2d Marine Logistics Group (Forward) in support of Operation Iraqi Freedom 06-08 in Al Anbar Province, Iraq. He returned from Iraq early 2008 and assumed command of 2d Marine Logistics Group in April. He turned over command of 2d Marine Logistics Group in late May 2008 and reported to III MEF, where he commanded 3d Marine Logistics Group from May 2008 to June 2010. From June 2010 until August 2012 he served as Vice Director, J-4, Joint Staff. He is currently assigned as Special Assistant to the Deputy Commandant for Installations and Logistics.
