= Kelly King =

American banker and business executive

- Born: Kelly S. King; September 12, 1948 (age 78); Raleigh, North Carolina, U.S.
- Education: East Carolina University (BBA, MBA); Rutgers University (Stonier Graduate School of Banking)
- Occupations: Banker; Business executive
- Years active: 1972–2022
- Known for: Chairman and CEO of Truist Financial; CEO of BB&T

Kelly S. King (born September 12, 1948) is an American former banking executive who was chairman and CEO of Truist Financial, formed through the 2019 merger of BB&T and SunTrust Banks. He previously was chairman and CEO of BB&T Corporation from 2009 to 2019. Over a 49-year career with BB&T and Truist, King held numerous leadership roles and is credited with guiding BB&T through the 2008 financial crisis and orchestrating one of the largest bank mergers in American history.

== Early life and education ==
King was born on September 12, 1948, in Raleigh, North Carolina. He grew up in a family of modest means, working on his family's tobacco farm in Zebulon, east of Raleigh, during his childhood. During high school, he worked as a salesman selling clothing and vacuums.

King earned a Bachelor of Business Administration and a Master of Business Administration from East Carolina University in Greenville, North Carolina. He subsequently attended the Stonier Graduate School of Banking at Rutgers University in Newark, New Jersey, where his thesis on leadership later became known as the Truist Leadership Model.

== Career ==
=== BB&T Corporation ===
King joined BB&T's Management Development Program in 1972, beginning a career that would span nearly five decades. Over the course of his tenure at BB&T, he held a wide range of leadership positions, including manager of the Central and Metropolitan regions, Raleigh city executive, Charlotte business services manager, Statesville consumer lending manager, and banking manager for BB&T's branch network.

He was President of BB&T Corporation from 1996 to June 2004, and as Chief Operating Officer of both BB&T Corporation and Branch Banking and Trust Company from June 2004 to December 2008.

In January 2009, King was named President and CEO of BB&T Corporation and Chairman and CEO of Branch Banking and Trust Company, succeeding John Allison. He became Chairman of BB&T Corporation in January 2010. King is credited with leading BB&T to continued profitability and financial stability during the 2008 financial crisis, and BB&T was among the first institutions to repay TARP funds.

In January 2009, King was also named a director of the Federal Reserve Bank of Richmond. He was on the Federal Advisory Council of the Federal Reserve System from 2013 to 2016, and was its president in 2016.

In December 2012, BB&T announced the elimination of a provision in King's contract that would have required him to step down at age 65, effectively extending his tenure as CEO.

King established the BB&T Leadership Institute, a program aimed at providing leadership development and consultation to corporate executives, business owners, and education leaders. He also founded the BB&T Lighthouse Project, an annual employee volunteer initiative that, since 2009, has resulted in more than 640,000 volunteer hours across over 11,000 community service projects.

=== Truist Financial ===
In 2019, regulators approved the merger of equals between BB&T and SunTrust Banks, creating Truist Financial — at the time one of the largest bank mergers in U.S. history. In December 2019, King became Chairman and CEO of Truist Financial Corporation, with the company relocating its headquarters to Charlotte, North Carolina.

King retired as CEO of Truist in September 2021, with William Rogers Jr., the company's president and chief operating officer, succeeding him. King remained as Executive Chairman of the Truist board until his full retirement in March 2022, concluding a 49-year career with BB&T and Truist.

=== Post-retirement ===
Following his retirement, King became a Senior Advisor to KSK Investors, a Charlotte-based investment firm focused on the financial sector, working alongside his son Ken King.

== Board memberships and civic roles ==
King was on numerous corporate and civic boards, including:

- Board member of the Federal Reserve Bank of Richmond (2009–2012)
- President of the Federal Advisory Council of the Federal Reserve System (2016)
- Board member of The Clearing House (from 2009)
- Chairman of the North Carolina Bankers Association board
- Chairman of the North Carolina Rural Economic Center
- Chairman of the North Carolina Small Business and Technology Development Center
- Chairman of the Board of Visitors, East Carolina University
- Chairman of the Piedmont Triad Partnership
- Vice Chairman of the American Bankers Council
- Board member of BEST NC, Foundation for the Carolinas, Charlotte Executive Leadership Council, and the Bank Policy Institute

== Recognition and awards ==
King received numerous awards and honors throughout his career:

- Named one of SNL Financial's Top 5 Most Influential in the Banking Industry (2014 and 2015)
- Named "Banker of the Year" by American Banker magazine (2015)
- Named one of BankInfoSecurity's "Top 10 Influencers in Banking InfoSec" (2015)
- Old Hickory Council Distinguished Citizen Award (2016)
- Inducted into the North Carolina Business Hall of Fame (2018)
- Named "Power Players 2019" by the Triad Business Journal (2019)
- Inducted into the North Carolina Banking Hall of Fame (2021)
- Named Businessperson of the Year by Charlotte Business Journal (2021)

== Personal life ==
King is a resident of North Carolina and is a Christian.
