= LightStream =

American online lender

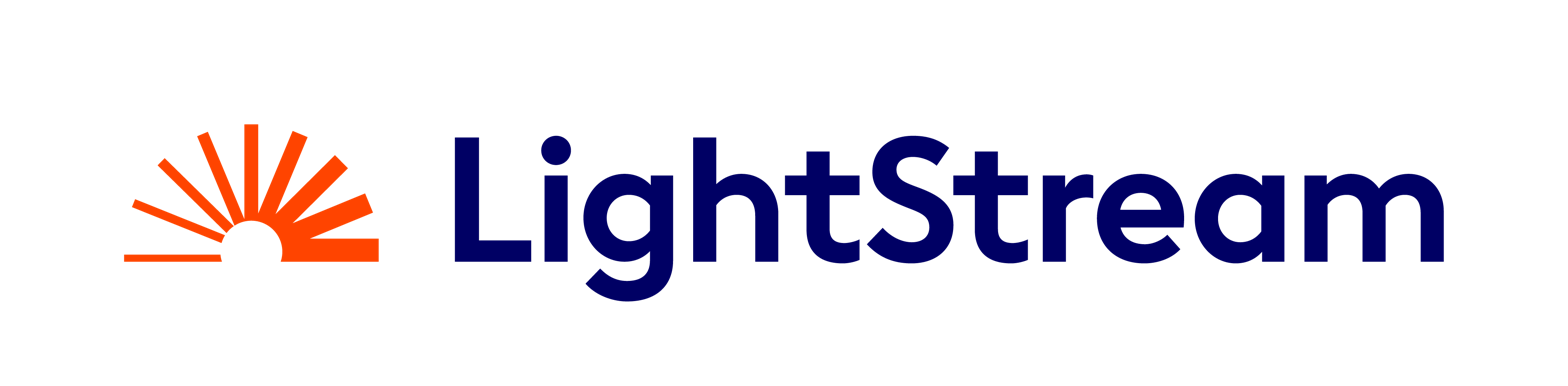
- Type: Public
- Industry: Financial technology
- Founded: 2012; 14 years ago
- Headquarters: San Diego, California
- Area served: United States
- Products: Personal loans
- Number of employees: 266
- Parent: Truist
- Website: lightstream.com

LightStream is an American online lender that is a division of Truist Bank. Truist was formed in December 2019, as the result of a “merger of equals" between SunTrust Bank (of which LightStream was a division) and BB&T.

Debuting in March 2013, LightStream is a financial services technology company that provides unsecured, personal loans to people with good credit rating, through a digital process.

On April 20, Truist announced that it will fold LightStream into its broader consumer business, a move designed to reduce the costs of operating a separate brand.

== Predecessor companies histories ==
=== PeopleFirst Finance LLC ===
PeopleFirst was established in 1995, by founders Gary Miller and Dave G. Zeller, who had backgrounds in the auto finance and banking industries. Based in San Diego, California, the company began offering direct-to-consumer auto loans through the internet in 1997. People applied online and when approved, quickly received a so-called "Blank Check" loan by mail. By 2003, PeopleFirst had grown to be the nation's largest online vehicle lender.

=== Capital One ===
Capital One purchased PeopleFirst in 2001. In 2003, the PeopleFirst brand name was changed to Capital One Auto Finance.

=== FirstAgain ===
FirstAgain was started by the founders of PeopleFirst along with W.R. (Randy) Ellspermann. Launching in 2005, FirstAgain expanded its online financing to include purposes beyond vehicle loans, giving unsecured loans for practically any purpose to consumers with excellent credit. This has since been adopted by others in the fintech industry.

=== SunTrust Bank ===
SunTrust Bank purchased FirstAgain in 2012. It was rebranded and launched as LightStream in 2013.
