= Crestar Bank =

Crestar Financial Corporation
- Industry: Banking
- Founded: December 8, 1865; 160 years ago
- Defunct: December 31, 1998; 27 years ago
- Fate: Acquired by SunTrust Banks
- Headquarters: Richmond, Virginia
- Key people: Richard G. Tilghman, Chairman & CEO; James M. Wells III, President; James D. Barr, CFO
- Total assets: ▲$24.928 billion (1997)
- Total equity: ▲$2.059 billion (1997)
- Number of employees: 8,215 (1997)

Crestar Bank was a bank headquartered in Richmond, Virginia with branches in DC, Virginia and Maryland. It was the leading subsidiary of Crestar Financial Corporation. In 1998, it was acquired by SunTrust Banks. At that time, it was the largest independent bank in Virginia.

== History ==
The bank was originally chartered as State Planters Bank of Commerce and Trusts on December 8, 1865 in Richmond.

In 1926, State Planters Bank of Commerce and Trusts merged with State & City Bank and Trust Co. and was renamed State Planters Bank and Trust Co.

In 1969, it was renamed United Virginia Bank/State Planters. It reorganized as a holding company, United Virginia Bankshares, in 1971, which changed its name to Crestar Financial Corporation in 1987.

In 1991, the bank acquired $527 million in deposits of Heritage Savings Bank for $2.35 million after it was seized by the Resolution Trust Corporation during the savings and loan crisis.

In 1992, the bank acquired Perpetual Savings Bank for $7.8 million after it was shut down by regulators.

In 1995, the bank acquired Loyola Federal Savings and Loan of Maryland for $251 million in stock. The bank also acquired 6 branches in Maryland from Chase Bank.

On January 20, 1995, Crestar bought Jefferson Savings & Loan, headquartered in Warrenton, Virginia.

In 1996, the bank acquired Citizens Bank of Maryland. As a result of this merger Crestar laid off as many as 600 middle managers and secretaries and closed as many as 26 of Citizens' 103 Washington area branches.

In 1997, the bank sold its merchant transaction processing business to Nova Corp. The bank also purchased a portfolio of student loans from Great Western Bank. With First Union's takeover later that year of Signet Banking Corporation, Crestar's longtime rival in Richmond, Crestar became the largest independent bank in Virginia.

However, analysts believed that Crestar was a likely takeover target. That came to pass on December 31, 1998, when in an agreement announced on July 20th of that year, Crestar was acquired by SunTrust Banks for $9.5 billion in stock; a merger that created the nation's 10th-largest bank holding company.

In December 2019, SunTrust merged with BB&T, forming Truist Financial.
