= James M. Wells III =

American banker

- Education: University of North Carolina at Chapel Hill
- Occupation: Banker
- Employer: SunTrust Banks

James M. Wells III is an American banker.

== Early life ==
James M. Wells III was born circa 1948. He graduated from the University of North Carolina at Chapel Hill.

== Career ==
Wells joined United Virginia Bank. in 1976. United Virginia eventually became Crestar, then SunTrust, where he worked his way up to CEO. He was replaced by William H. Rogers Jr., on June 1, 2011.

Wells served as a director of the Federal Reserve Bank of Atlanta, the Financial Services Roundtable, Visa U.S.A. Inc., the Crestar Financial Corporation, and the Crestar Bank, acquired by SunTrust Banks in 1998.

Wells is a trustee of the Georgia Research Alliance. Since November 2010, he has been director of Operation HOPE Inc.
