= William H. Rogers Jr. =

American businessman

- Born: 1957 or 1958 (age 68–69); Durham, North Carolina, U.S.
- Education: University of North Carolina at Chapel Hill (BSBA); Georgia State University (MBA)
- Occupation: Banker
- Title: Chairman and Chief Executive Officer, Truist Financial Corporation

William H. Rogers Jr. (born 1957/58) is an American businessman who is the chairman and chief executive officer of Truist Financial Corporation.

He was previously chairman and chief executive officer of Atlanta-based SunTrust Banks. In December 2019, Charlotte-based Truist was created through a merger of equals between SunTrust and Winston-Salem-based BB&T. Truist is currently the sixth largest U.S. bank, and the merger was the biggest bank deal since the 2008 financial crisis. Rogers became president and chief operating officer of Truist after the merger, and he became CEO in September 2021.

== Early life ==
Rogers was raised in Durham, North Carolina. He received a bachelor's degree in business administration from the University of North Carolina at Chapel Hill and an MBA from Georgia State University.

== Career ==
Rogers started his career at the Trust Company of Georgia, which later merged with SunBanks, Inc. of Florida in 1985 to form SunTrust Banks. He served as coporate executive vice president and later chief operating officer. He became president in December 2008, CEO in June 20111, and chairman in January 2012, succeeding James M. Wells, III. Rogers became president and chief operating officer of Truist in December 2019 and became CEO in September 2021.

== Other positions ==
Rogers is a board member of the Boys & Girls Clubs of America, Operation HOPE and the Bank Policy Institute. He also serves as a member of Emory University's board of trustees.
