= Bank Policy Institute =

American advocacy organization

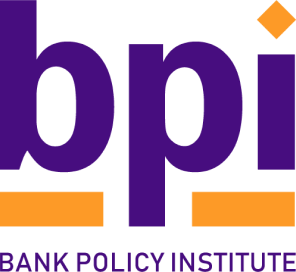
- Abbreviation: BPI
- Established: 1912
- Type: Industry trade group
- Tax ID no.: 36-0753125
- Legal status: 501(c)(6)
- Location: Washington, DC
- Chairman: Jamie Dimon
- President and CEO: Greg Baer
- Revenue: US$29,899,102 (2019)
- Website: www.bpi.com

The Bank Policy Institute (BPI) is an American public policy, research, and advocacy organization, based in Washington, D.C.

The organization was formed in July 2018 following the merger of the Financial Services Roundtable and the Clearing House Association. BPI's members include 42 banking institutions representing universal banks, regional banks, and foreign banks doing business in the United States. The CEO is Greg Baer, a former litigator, corporate executive and public official who was Assistant Secretary for Financial Institutions at the U.S. Department of the Treasury during the Clinton administration and as Managing Senior Counsel for the Federal Reserve Board of Governors.

== History ==
The Association of Reserve City Bankers was formed in 1912 with 102 charter members and, in 1958, the Association of Registered Bank Holding Companies was formed due to the Bank Holding Company Act of 1956. In 1993, these two entities merged to form the Bankers Roundtable. The name of the organization was changed to the Financial Services Roundtable in 2000 to reflect a decision to broaden the organization's mission to include integrated financial service providers.

In July 2018, Financial Services Roundtable merged with the Clearing House Association to form the Bank Policy Institute. The organization was formed to bolster banks' political and public policy influence in Washington, D.C.

=== Divisions ===
BITS (Business-Innovation-Technology-Security — formerly named the Business Industry Technology Secretariat) formed as a division within the then-Bankers Roundtable in 1996. Its mission was to enhance collaboration across the industry on technological issues and address "emerging threats and opportunities,” including cybersecurity, fraud reduction, and critical infrastructure protection.

== Leadership ==
While Greg Baer is the CEO, the organization's board of directors is chaired by JPMorgan Chase CEO Jamie Dimon and consists of the following financial services executives:

- Jamie Dimon, JPMorgan Chase & Co. (Chairman)
- Brian T. Moynihan, Bank of America
- Jean-Laurent Bonnafé, BNP Paribas
- Robin Vince, BNY Mellon
- Richard Fairbank, Capital One
- Jane Fraser, Citigroup
- Bruce Van Saun, Citizens
- Tim Spence, Fifth Third
- Bryan Jordan, First Horizon
- David Solomon, Goldman Sachs
- Stephen Steinour, Huntington
- René Jones, M&T Bank
- Kanetsugu Mike, MUFG
- John Turner, Jr., Regions
- William Rogers, Truist
- Andrew Cecere, U.S. Bancorp
- Charles W. Scharf, Wells Fargo

Heather Hogsett is an executive vice president and head of BITS, the technology policy division of the Bank Policy Institute.

== Members ==
BPI has approximately 42 member companies, including:

- Ally Financial
- Barclays
- BMO Financial Group
- BNP Paribas
- BNY Mellon
- Capital One
- Charles Schwab Corporation
- CIBC
- Citibank
- Citizens Bank
- Comerica Bank
- Discover Financial
- Fifth Third Bank
- First Horizon National Corporation
- American Express
- Goldman Sachs
- HSBC USA
- Huntington
- JPMorgan Chase & Co.
- Key Bank
- Morgan Stanley
- M&T Bank
- MUFG Bank
- Northern Trust
- PNC Bank
- Popular, Inc.
- Raymond James Financial
- Royal Bank of Canada
- Bank of America
- Regions Financial Corporation
- Santander Bank
- Silicon Valley Bank
- State Street Corporation
- Synchrony Financial
- Synovus
- TD Bank
- Truist Financial
- UBS
- United Bankshares, Inc.
- U.S. Bank
- Wells Fargo
- Zions Bancorporation

== Major initiatives ==
BPI was a vocal advocate for reforms to beneficial ownership requirements that would require the U.S. Department of Treasury Financial Crimes Enforcement Network to collect information from companies at the time of incorporation to determine who owns or has a financial interest in the company. A legislative fix, supported by BPI, passed in 2020 as a provision of the annual defense spending bill known as the National Defense Authorization Act.
