= Susquehanna Bank =

Lancaster, Pennsylvania-based bank (1901–2015)

- Traded as: Nasdaq: SUSQ
- Industry: Bank holding company
- Founded: 1901 (As "Farmers National Bank of Lititz")
- Defunct: 2015; 11 years ago
- Fate: Acquired by BB&T (now Truist Financial)
- Successor: Truist Financial
- Headquarters: Lancaster, Pennsylvania
- Products: Financial services

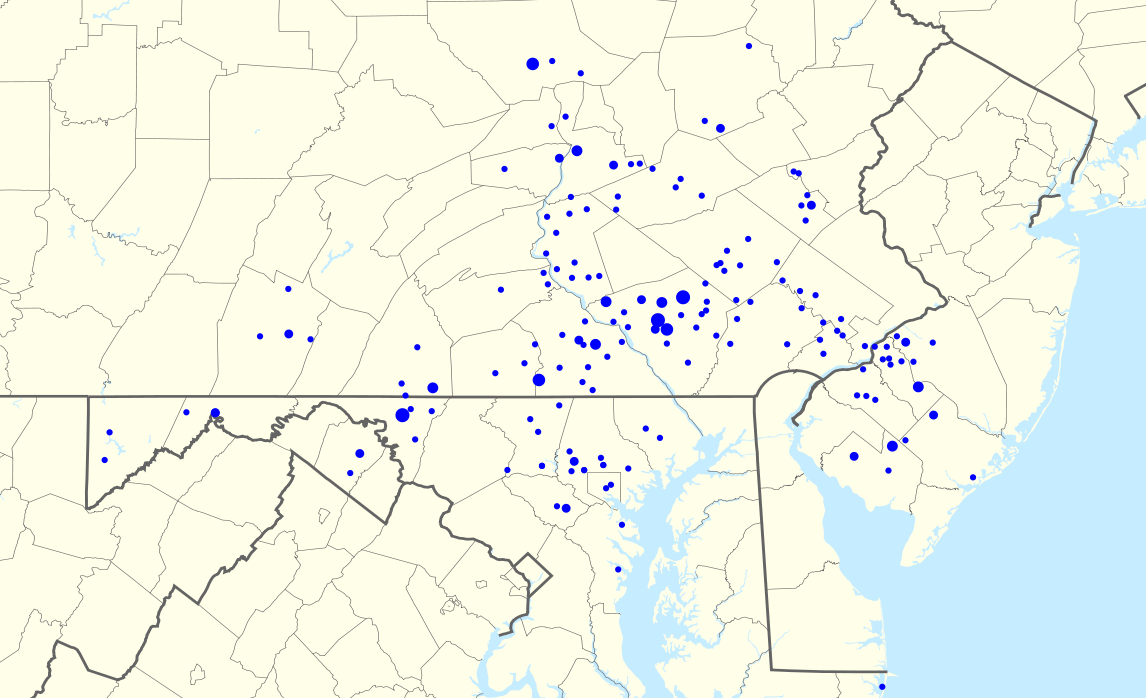
Susquehanna Bank branch footprint.

Susquehanna Bank was a Lancaster, Pennsylvania-based bank which operated over 260 branches in four states including Pennsylvania, Maryland, New Jersey, and West Virginia. Susquehanna Bank's parent company was Susquehanna Bancshares, Inc. a regional financial services holding company based in Lititz, Pennsylvania with assets of approximately US$18,000,000,000 and 3,400 employees.

== History ==
Susquehanna Bank was founded in 1901 as the Farmers National Bank of Lititz. In 1972 this bank changed its name to Farmers First Bank, and beginning in the 1970s it began to acquire other banks in the region, establishing Susquehanna Bancshares as its holding company in 1982 and expanding its reach into the states south of Pennsylvania beginning in the late 1980s. In 2004, Susquehanna Bancshares consolidated its operations into three banks, all using the Susquehanna name. The company continued to expand, including two large acquisitions in 2008.

In 2008, Susquehanna Bank acquired the naming rights to the Susquehanna Bank Center in Camden, New Jersey.

In 2011, Susquehanna Bank announced its purchase of Abington Bank.

In 2014, BB&T (now Truist Financial), announced the acquisition of Susquehanna Bank. The deal was finalized on August 3, 2015, and all Susquehanna Bank branches, as well as the Entertainment Center in Camden, were converted to BB&T four months later.
