= L. Phillip Humann =

American business executive (born 1945)

- Born: November 1945; Independence, Kansas, United States
- Education: Auburn University
- Occupation: Business executive
- Known for: Former Chairman & CEO of SunTrust Banks
- Spouse: Jane Humann
- Children: 3

L. Phillip Humann (born 1945) is an American business executive. He is a former chairman and chief executive officer of SunTrust Banks.

== Early life ==
L. Phillip Humann was born in November 1945 in Independence, Kansas. He graduated from Auburn University, where he earned a bachelor's in 1967 and master's degree in 1969, both in Economics.

== Career ==
Humann began his career at SunTrust Banks in 1969. He was its president from March 1992 to December 2004. He served as its chief executive officer from March 1998 to December 2006, and as its chairman from March 1998 to April 2008.

Humann served on the board of directors of Coca-Cola Enterprises from 1992 to May 2016, and on the board of Havertys from May 2010 to August 2012.

Humann has served as an independent non-executive director and chairman of the nomination committee of Coca-Cola European Partners since May 2016. He also serves on the board of Equifax.

== Personal life ==
Humann has a wife, Jane, and three children.
