= SunTrust =

Former American bank

SunTrust Banks, Inc.

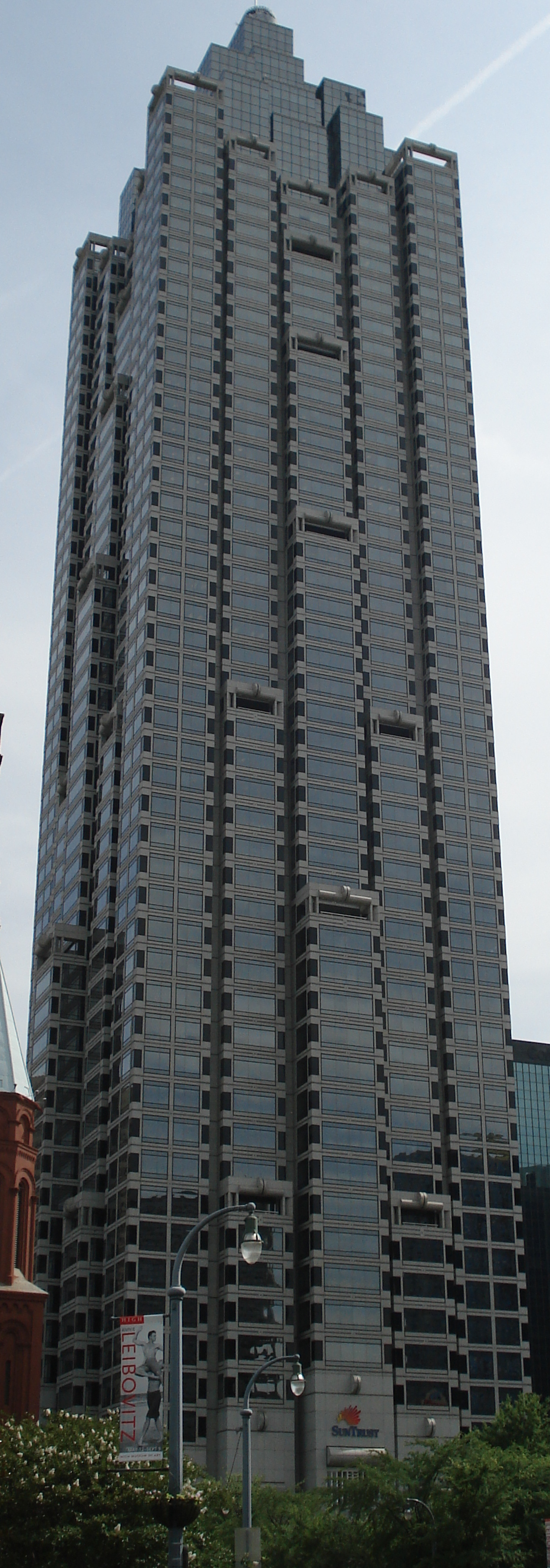
- SunTrust Plaza, the former headquarters of SunTrust in Atlanta, Georgia.
- Type: Subsidiary
- Traded as: NYSE: STI
- Industry: Banking
- Founded: 1985
- Defunct: December 6, 2019; 6 years ago (as an independent corporation); February 18, 2022; 4 years ago (as a brand)
- Fate: Merged with BB&T to form Truist
- Successor: Truist
- Headquarters: SunTrust Plaza; 303 Peachtree Street NE, Atlanta, Georgia, United States
- Number of locations: 1,218 branches 2,082 ATMs
- Area served: Southeastern United States
- Key people: William H. Rogers Jr. Chairman and CEO
- Products: Financial services
- Number of employees: 22,899 (2018)
- Website: www.suntrust.com (Now redirects to the Truist website)

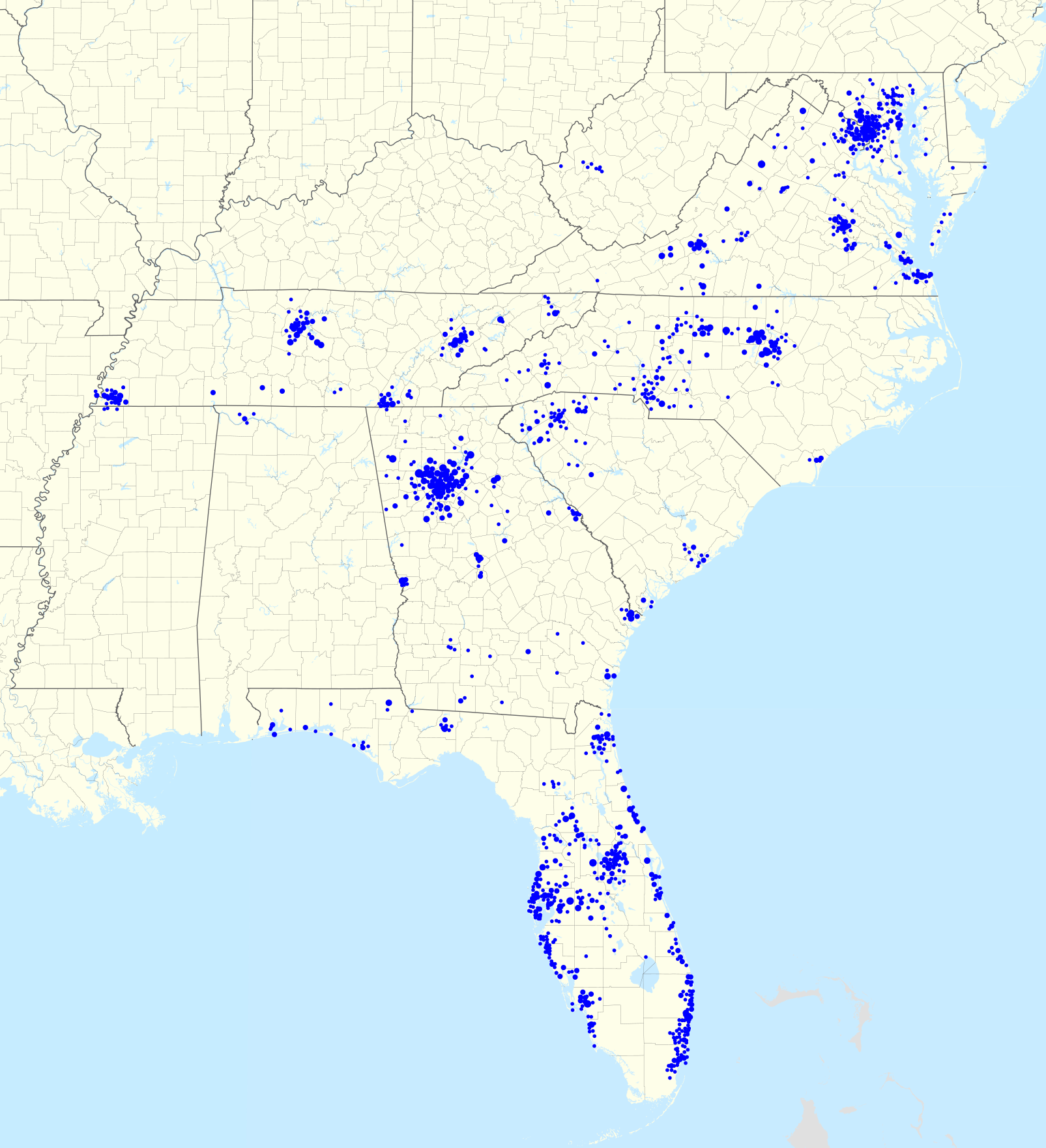
SunTrust locations in the United States

SunTrust Banks, Inc. was an American bank holding company with SunTrust Bank as its largest subsidiary and assets of US$205 billion as of March 31, 2018. The bank's most direct corporate parent was established in 1891 in Atlanta, where it was headquartered.

As of September 2016, SunTrust Bank operated 1,400 bank branches and 2,160 ATMs across 11 southeastern states and Washington, D.C. The bank's primary businesses included deposits, lending, credit cards, and trust and investment services. Through its various subsidiaries, the company provided corporate and investment banking, capital market services, mortgage banking, and wealth management — with nearly 24,000 employees. In 2013, it was ordered to pay $1.5 billion "to resolve claims of shoddy mortgage lending, servicing and foreclosure practices," and it reached a preliminary $968 Million settlement with the US government in 2014.

In February 2019, SunTrust Banks announced its pending purchase by BB&T for $28 billion in an all-stock deal, creating the sixth largest U.S. lender, being the biggest bank deal since the 2008 financial crisis. On December 6, 2019, the merger between BB&T and SunTrust closed, forming Truist Financial Corporation.

== History ==
=== Trust Company of Georgia ===
On September 21, 1891, SunTrust's most direct corporate ancestor, the Trust Company of Georgia, was granted a charter by the Georgia General Assembly as the Commercial Travelers' Savings Bank of Atlanta. The founders were John M. Green, Joel Hurt, H. L. Atwater, W. A. Hansell, T. J. Hightower, J. G. Oglesby, J. D. Turner, John B. Daniel, Joseph Hirsch, Leon Lieberman, Louis Wellhouse, A. J. McBride, D. O. Dougherty, W. A. Gregg, W. W. Draper, A. C. Hook, W. T. Ashford, George W. Brooke, C. I. Branan, and C. D. Montgomery.

In November 1893, it restructured as a trust company and renamed itself Trust Company of Georgia.

=== Sun Bank ===
The earliest predecessor of Sun Bank was founded in 1911 as The People's National Bank in Orlando, Florida. In 1920, it became the First National Bank. In the early 1930s, during the Great Depression, the First National Bank and Trust Company failed. It was reorganized on Valentine's Day 1934 as the First National Bank at Orlando. In 1973, the bank merged with other Orlando banks to become SunBanks. As of December 31, 1973, it had three bank-related subsidiaries and total assets of $1.713 billion.

In the early 1980s, the bank pursued further mergers, positioning itself for the state of Florida to eventually allow interstate banking. It incorporated 81-year-old Hillsboro Bank, based in Plant City, an institution with $150 million in assets and then the third-oldest state-chartered bank. It also bought Florida State Bank of Tallahassee, with which it had tried to merge with in 1973, when the economy soured.

In May 1983, Sun announced a deal for Miami-based Flagship Bank Inc., with $3.3 billion in assets, that positioned Sun to be one of the Florida's largest bank holding companies. The Flagship deal was the seventh struck by Sun in less than a year.

=== Trust Company of Georgia merger ===
In 1985, Trust Company of Georgia and SunBanks merged to form SunTrust Banks, Inc. The merged company was headquartered in Atlanta, and continued to operate as Trust Company Bank in Georgia and Sun Bank in Florida.

The newly merged company made its first major deal in December 1986, when it purchased Third National Corporation of Nashville. However, it continued to use the Third National name in Tennessee. In 1995, SunTrust retired the Trust Company Bank, Sun Bank and Third National names and rebranded all of its banking subsidiaries as SunTrust.

SunTrust purchased Crestar Financial Corporation of Richmond, Virginia in 1998, expanding the company's footprint into Virginia, Maryland, and the District of Columbia. Crestar was founded in 1865 as State Planters Bank of Commerce and Trusts in 1865, becoming United Virginia Bank in 1969 and Crestar in 1987. Crestar's (and SunTrust's) earliest predecessor, Farmers Bank of Alexandria, was founded in 1811.

In 1988, Suntrust was added to the S&P 500 Stock Price Index.

In 2001, SunTrust purchased the institutional businesses of the Robinson-Humphrey Company, LLC. creating SunTrust Robinson-Humphrey.

The company bought Memphis-based National Commerce Financial Corporation (NCF) for $7 billion in 2004. The bank operated as National Bank of Commerce in South Carolina, Tennessee, Mississippi, Arkansas, Alabama, Georgia, Virginia, and West Virginia and as Central Carolina Bank and Trust in North Carolina. This acquisition allowed SunTrust to enter Alabama, the Carolinas, and West Virginia for the first time, and substantially increased its footprint in the other states.

In 2013, the bank led a bank group that included Fifth Third Bank and Florida Community Bank that helped finance the acquirement of BEL USA, the parent company that owns DiscountMugs, by Comvest Partners, a private equity firm.

In 2014, SunTrust announced it would launch a medical specialty group to work with independent medical practices.

On September 16, 2014, the Atlanta Braves announced the name of their new Cobb County stadium: SunTrust Park. SunTrust Park, which opened for the 2017 season as their new home. The $1.1 billion construction project in Cobb County included The Battery Atlanta, a district of restaurants, shops, offices, a hotel, and residential spaces directly connected to the park, all built during the construction of stadium itself. The name SunTrust Park was used until the 2020 season when it was renamed Truist Park.

=== The Robinson-Humphrey Company ===
The Robinson-Humphrey Company, one of Atlanta's oldest and important companies, was acquired by SunTrust in 2001. However, SunTrust had long coveted Robinson-Humphrey, reportedly having pursued it for more than 80 years. Trust Company of Georgia, the oldest progenitor of SunTrust, was rebuffed in an effort to buy Robinson-Humphrey in 1917.

The firm was founded as a municipal bond shop by Roby Robinson in 1894. Robinson and William G. Humphrey, a bond trader from Toledo, Ohio, eventually incorporated The Robinson-Humphrey Co. in 1902. It blossomed into the leading investment banking firm in the South under Chairman Justus Martin Jr., who helped broaden its ties to Atlanta corporations, European clients and the firm's wealthy families who were brokerage clients. Martin was at the helm when Robinson-Humphrey commissioned the building of the bold Atlanta Financial Center in city's tony Buckhead business district in the early 1980s.

In 1982, Martin sold Robinson-Humphrey to American Express, which was then run by another Atlanta deal maker and fellow Georgia Tech grad, James Robinson (no relation to Roby Robinson). Under AmEx, the firm operated as part of Shearson Lehman Brothers Inc. In 1993, deal maker Sandy Weill orchestrated a deal for Shearson's retail division, and Robinson-Humphrey was included in the sale, using the Smith Barney unit of Primerica Corp.

=== Truist Financial Corporation ===
On February 7, 2019, BB&T Corporation reported that it would acquire SunTrust to create the sixth-largest US bank, with assets of $442 billion and market capitalization around $66 billion. BB&T will be the nominal survivor, but the merged bank will be headquartered in Charlotte under a new name, Truist Financial Corporation. However, Truist will retain significant operations in Atlanta. It was subsequently announced that Atlanta will be Truist's headquarters for wholesale banking, while Winston-Salem will be the headquarters for community banking. This could mean more jobs in both cities. SunTrust had been the last major bank headquartered in Atlanta, which had been the South's financial capital for much of the 20th century.

The merger closed on December 6, 2019. On that day, SunTrust Bank merged into BB&T's banking unit, Branch Banking and Trust Company, forming Truist Bank as the merged company's legal banking entity. However, the merged bank will continue to operate under the BB&T and SunTrust names until the two banks' systems are combined, a process that could take up to two years. Customers of either company will be able to use the other's ATMs without charge during the process.

== Pre-Merger operations and structure ==
The company operated three primary business units: Consumer Banking & Private Wealth Management, Wholesale Banking, and Mortgage.

Business Mix, as of June 30, 2016
Business Line	Percentage of Revenue
Consumer Banking	32%
Corporate & Investment Banking	20%
Commercial & Business Banking	14%
Private Wealth Management	12%
Mortgage	11%
Consumer Lending	8%
Commercial Real Estate	3%

As of September 2016, SunTrust Bank operates 1,400 bank branches and 2,160 ATMs across including Alabama, Arkansas, Florida, Georgia, Maryland, Mississippi, North Carolina, South Carolina, Tennessee, Virginia, West Virginia, and Washington, D.C. The bank announced in 2018 that it will close its last five West Virginia branches, all in Kroger stores.

=== Executives ===
Individual	Position	Years
William H. Rogers Jr.	Chairman, President and CEO	2011 – 2019
James M. Wells III	Chairman, President and CEO	2007 – 2011
L. Phillip Humann	Chairman, President and CEO	1998 – 2007
James B. "Jimmy" Williams	Chairman, President and CEO	1990 – 1998
Robert M. Strickland	Chairman/SunTrust; president of Trust Company in 1973	1978 – 1990

On April 21, 2011, William H. Rogers Jr., began a transition into the CEO role previously held by Jim Wells, who retired December 31, 2011. Formerly SunTrust's COO, Rogers assumed the title of CEO on June 1, 2011. Rogers had been named President in 2008. At that time, the current Chief Financial Officer (CFO) is Aleem Gillani was named in April 2011.

In 2015 and 2016, two corporate treasurers have gone on to become CFOs at large regional banks, including Kevin Blair at Zions Bancorporation and Paul Burdiss at Synovus, and a unit strategy head, Inder M. Singh, became CFO at IT firm Unisys.

== Relationship with Coca-Cola ==
SunTrust had a long-standing relationship with The Coca-Cola Company. In 1919, Ernest Woodruff, president of the Trust Company from 1904 to 1922, and W. C. Bradley bought The Coca-Cola Company for $25 million and restructured. The Trust Company of Georgia helped underwrite the initial public offering, accepting shares of Coke in exchange for its services. Four years later, his son, Robert W. Woodruff, was elected Coca-Cola's president, a title he would hold until 1954 and was a board member until 1984.

As a result, SunTrust owned 48.3 million shares (3.58%) of Coke as of 2006, which had a GAAP cost basis of $110,000. In addition, the original copy of the formula for Coca-Cola was stored in a safe deposit box of an eventual SunTrust location in Atlanta (originally a Trust Company Bank location) from 1925 to 2011. It was eventually moved to a purpose built vault in the World of Coca-Cola, also in Atlanta.

Over the years, Coca-Cola executives would sit on SunTrust's board of directors and SunTrust execs would sit on Coca-Cola's board.

SunTrust started to divest Coke shares in May 2007, when it sold 4.5 million, or 9% of its position. In 2008, the bank sold another 10 million shares, donated 3.6 million to SunTrust's charitable foundation, and crafted a plan to sell more shares in 2014 and 2015.

However, in September 2012, SunTrust sold all of its Coke shares at the behest of its primary regulator, the Federal Reserve. SunTrust was forced to resubmit its capital plan – known as Comprehensive Capital Analysis and Review (CCAR) – after it failed part of the stress test in March 2012. The Coke shares (or any stock holding) held by SunTrust would weigh on the bank's capital ratio under new capital rules within Basel III. Thus, SunTrust decided to accelerate its plan and sold the Coke shares earlier than expected.

== 2014 National Mortgage Settlement ==
In 2014, the Federal government together with state attorneys general in 49 states and the District of Columbia reached a settlement requiring SunTrust Mortgage, Inc., to provide $500 million in various forms of relief to mortgage borrowers. The United States District Court for the District of Columbia entered the Consent Order on September 30, 2014. The consent order addressed SunTrust's alleged misconduct regarding its mortgage servicing and foreclosure practices. SunTrust was also required to create a 40 million dollar fund for the approximately 45,000 SunTrust borrowers who were foreclosed upon between January 1, 2008 and December 31, 2013. In addition, SunTrust was required to adhere to significant new homeowner protections. The consent order required that SunTrust follow the servicing standards set up by the 2012 National Mortgage Settlement (NMS) with the five largest banks.

== Controversies ==
In September 2015 SunTrust laid off one hundred IT professionals with a controversial severance agreement clause by SunTrust that required laid-off employees to be available to help without pay for a period of two years. On October 23, Suntrust reversed course and removed the clause: "to make myself reasonably available to SunTrust regarding matters in which I have been involved in the course of my employment with SunTrust and/or about which I have knowledge as a result of my employment with SunTrust."

== Buildings and branches ==
Located at 200 South Orange Avenue, The SunTrust Center is the tallest building in downtown Orlando, Florida. The 35 story, 650,000 sq ft (60,000 m^{2}) building was constructed in 1988 at a cost of approximately $100 million. It is constructed of reinforced concrete and granite with marble finishes and features 17 elevators.

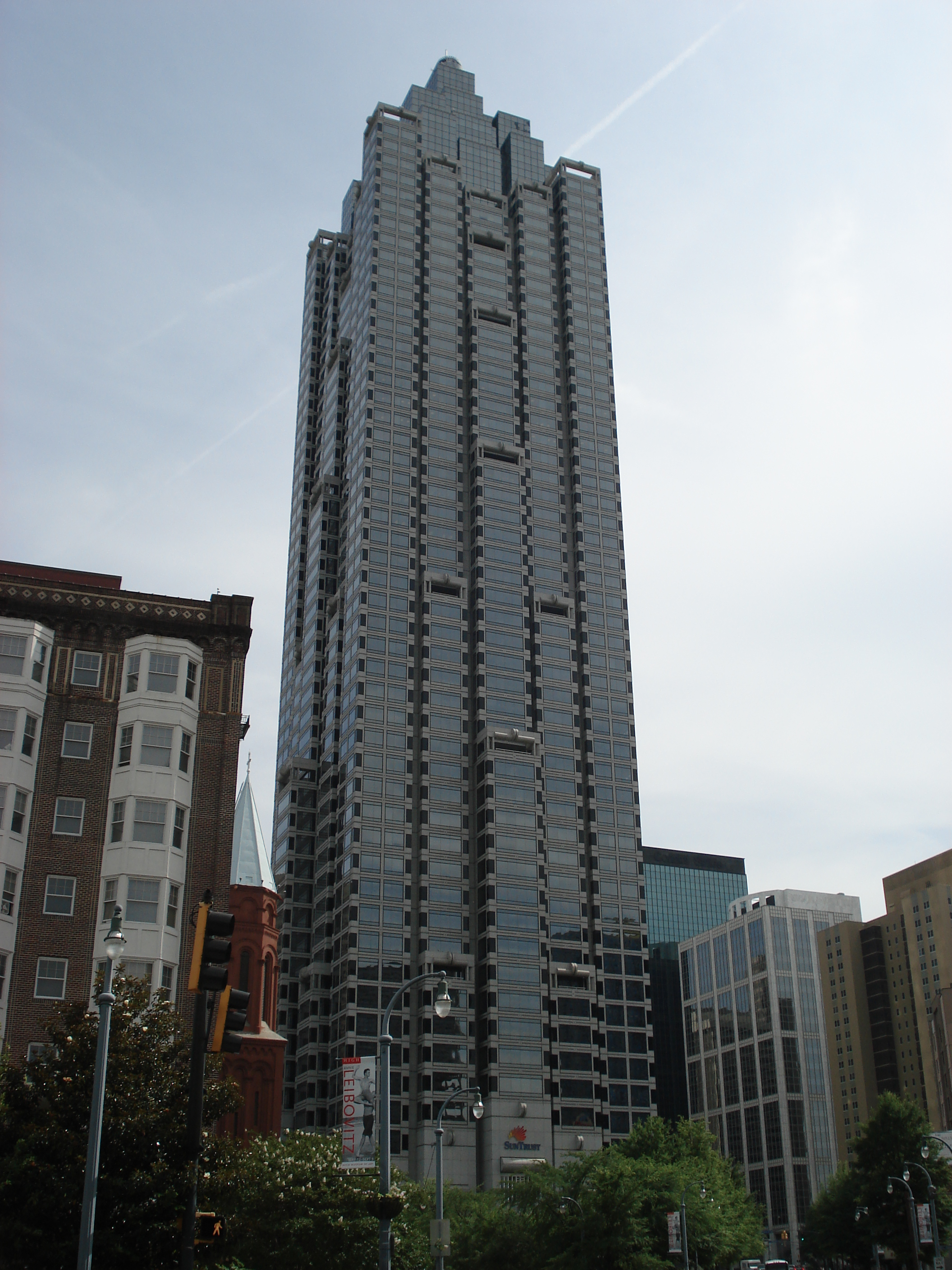
SunTrust Plaza in Atlanta, Georgia

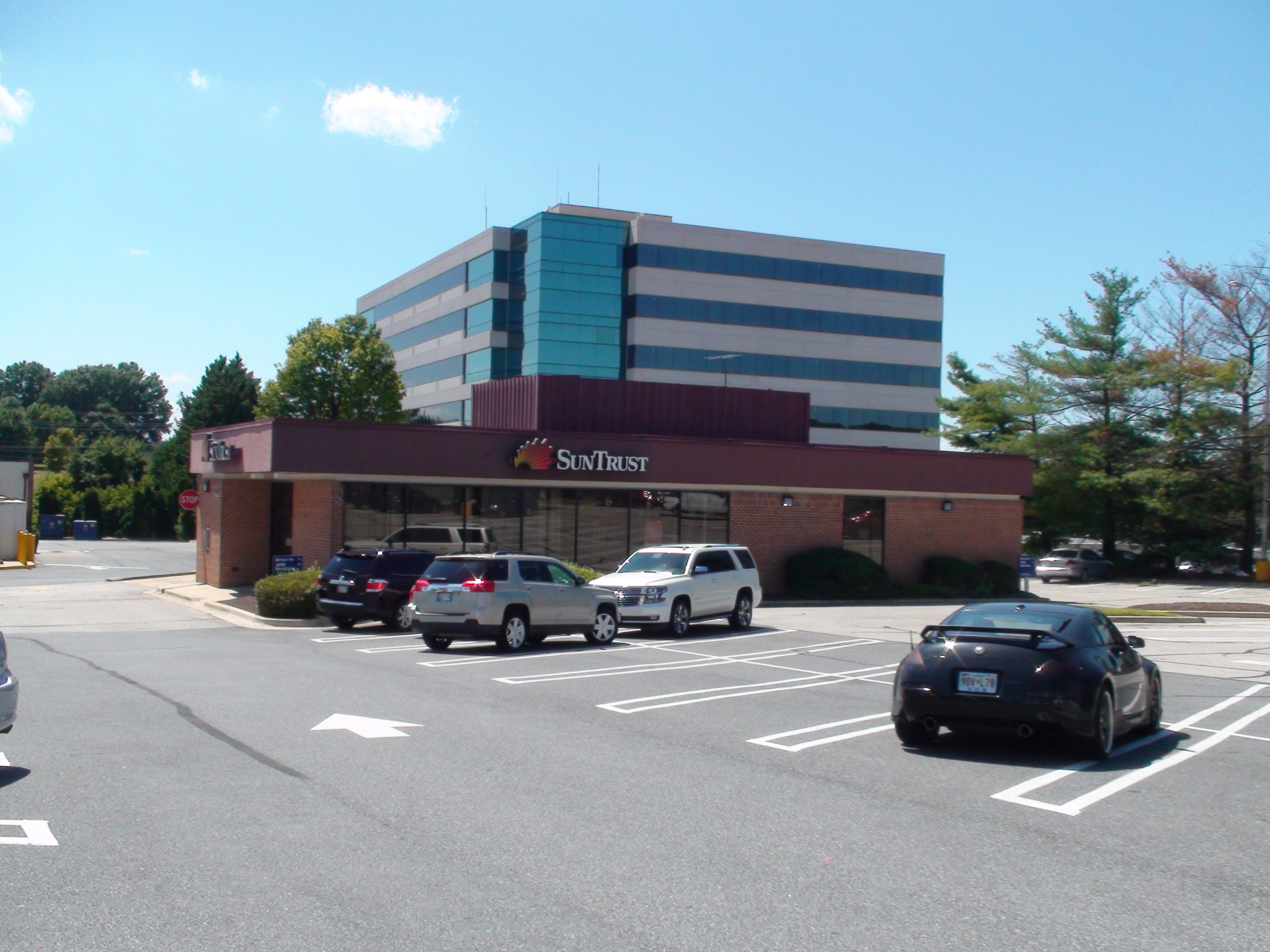
Suntrust Bank in Gaithersburg, Maryland

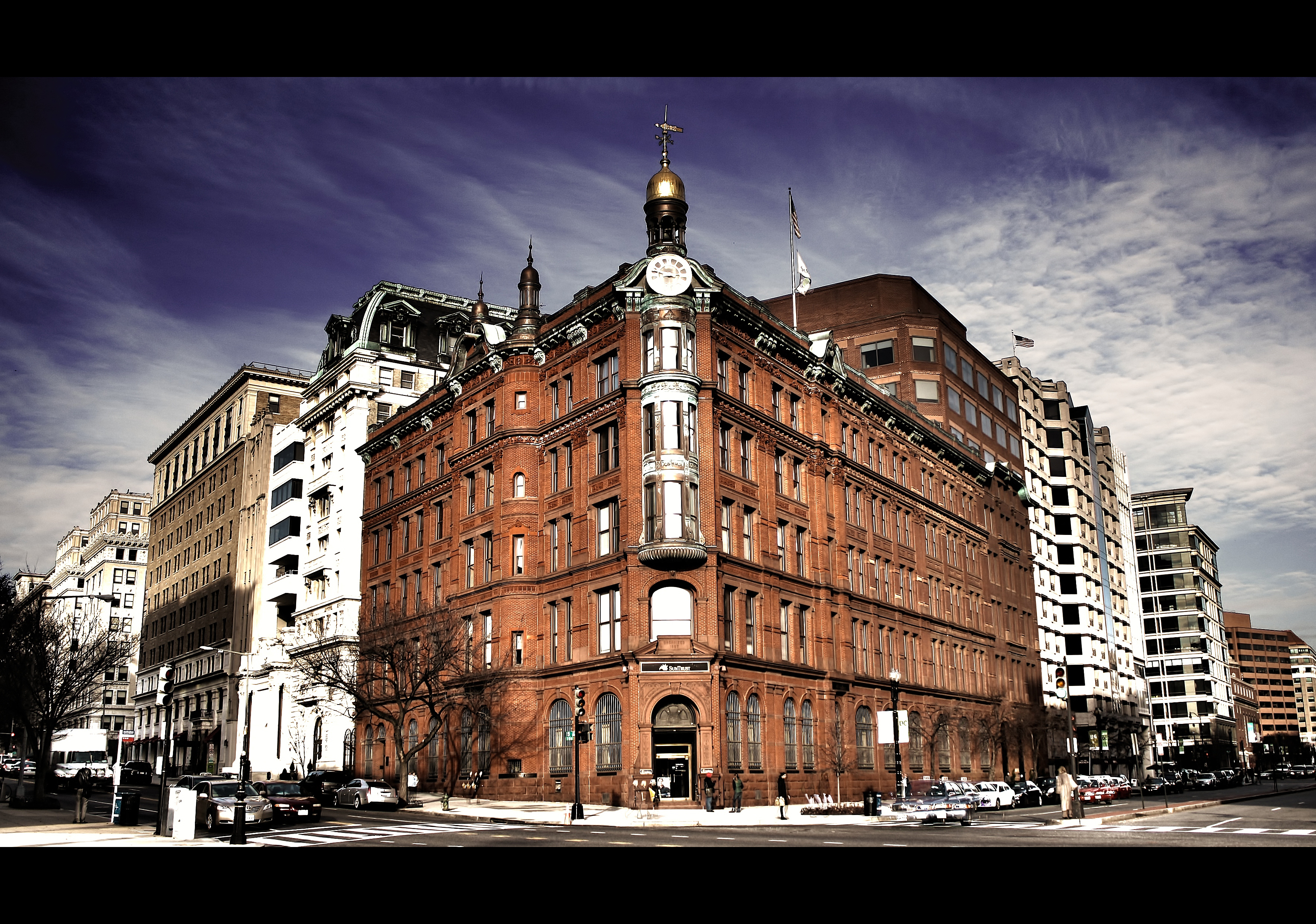
Fifteenth and New York Branch in Washington, D.C. (2012)

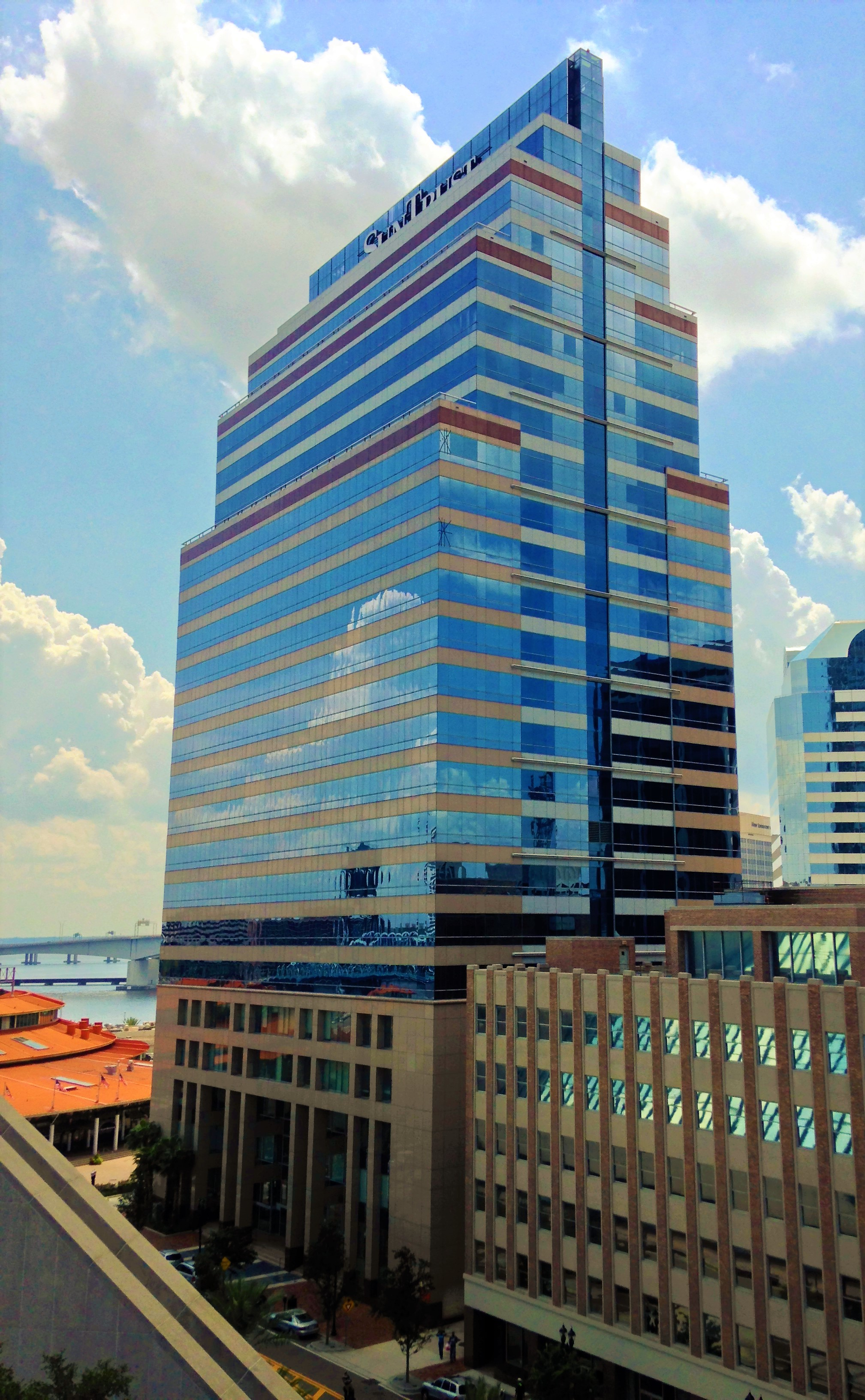
SunTrust Tower, located on Laura Street in Jacksonville, Florida

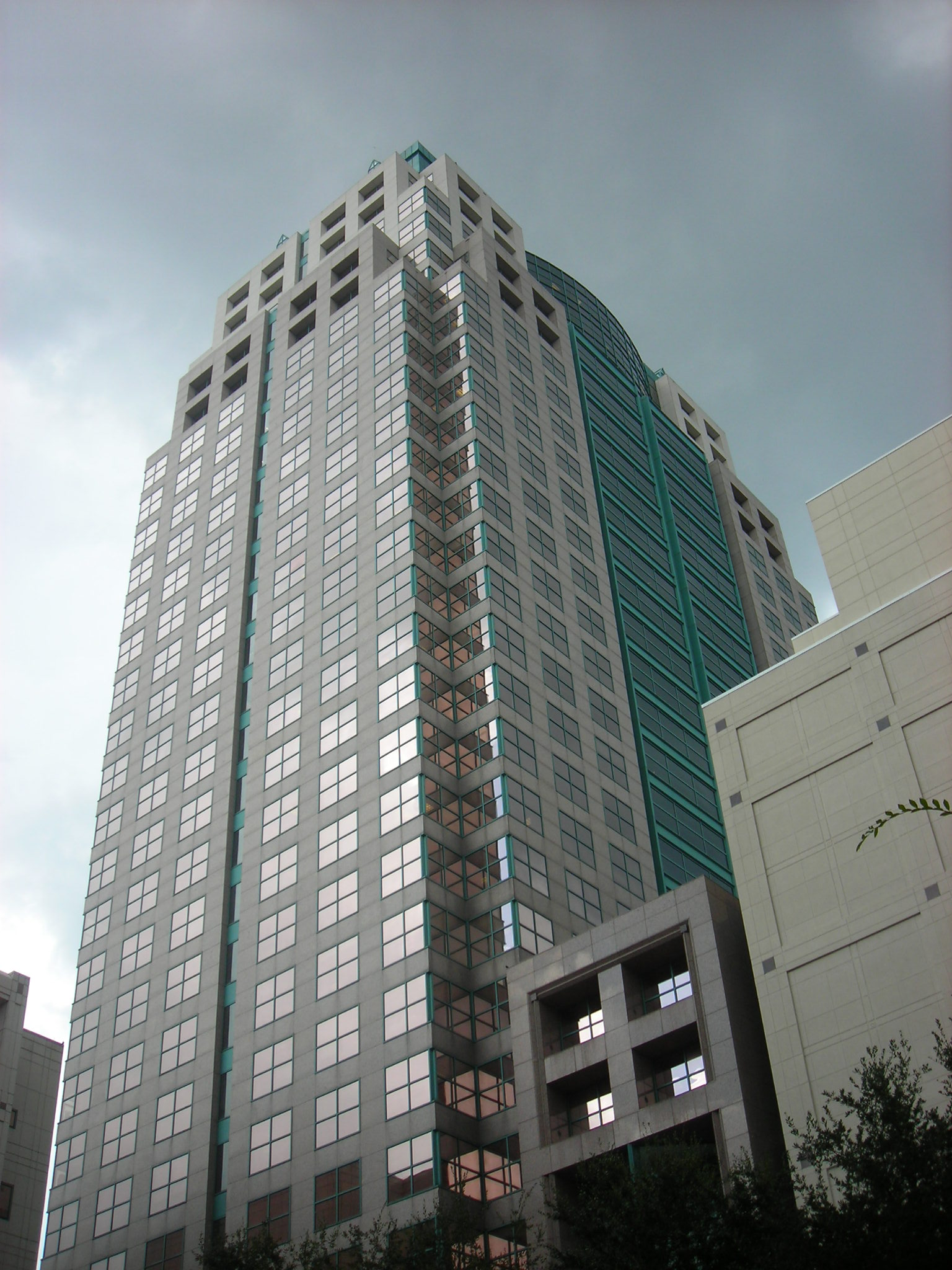
SunTrust Center in Orlando, Florida

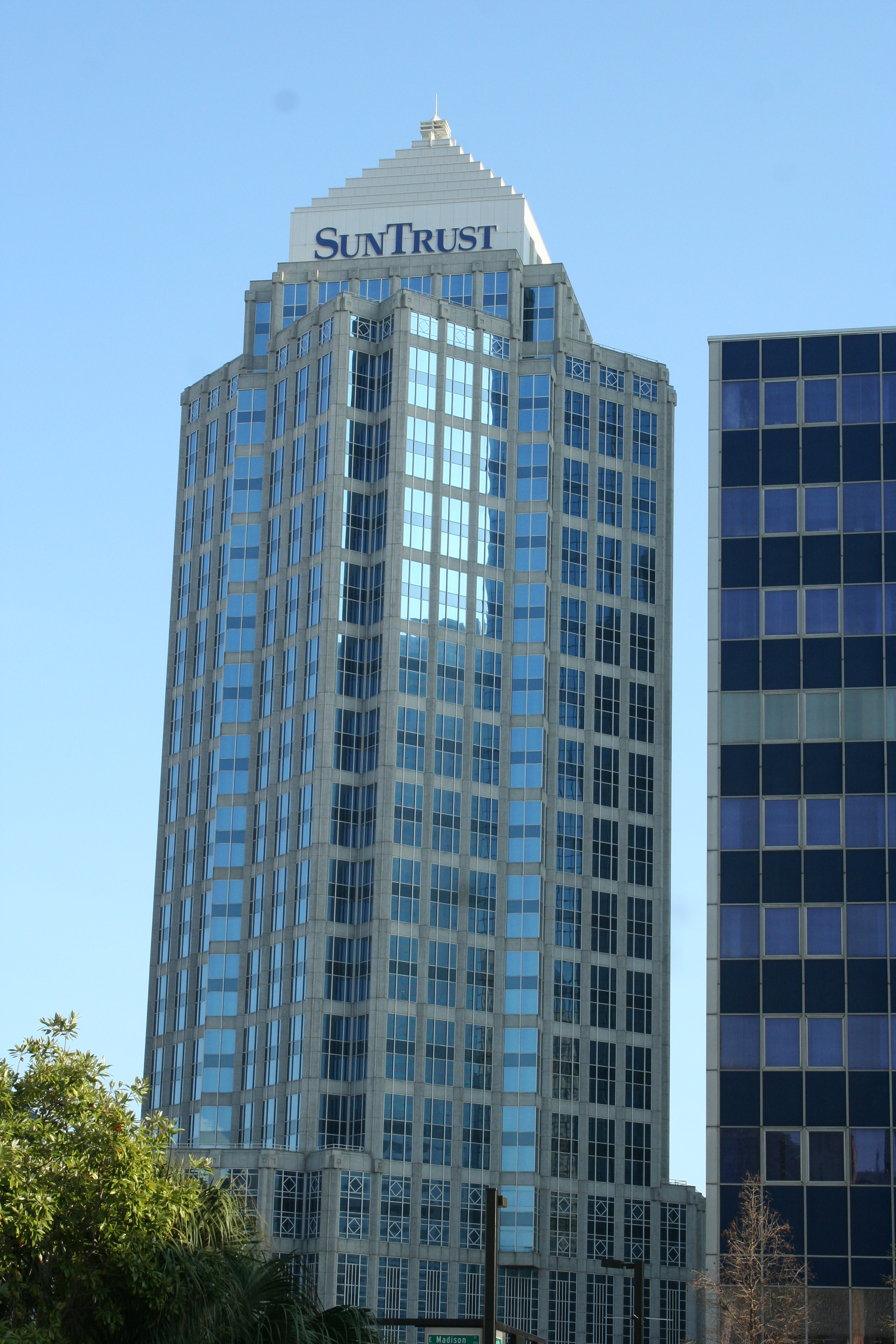
SunTrust building in Tampa, Florida

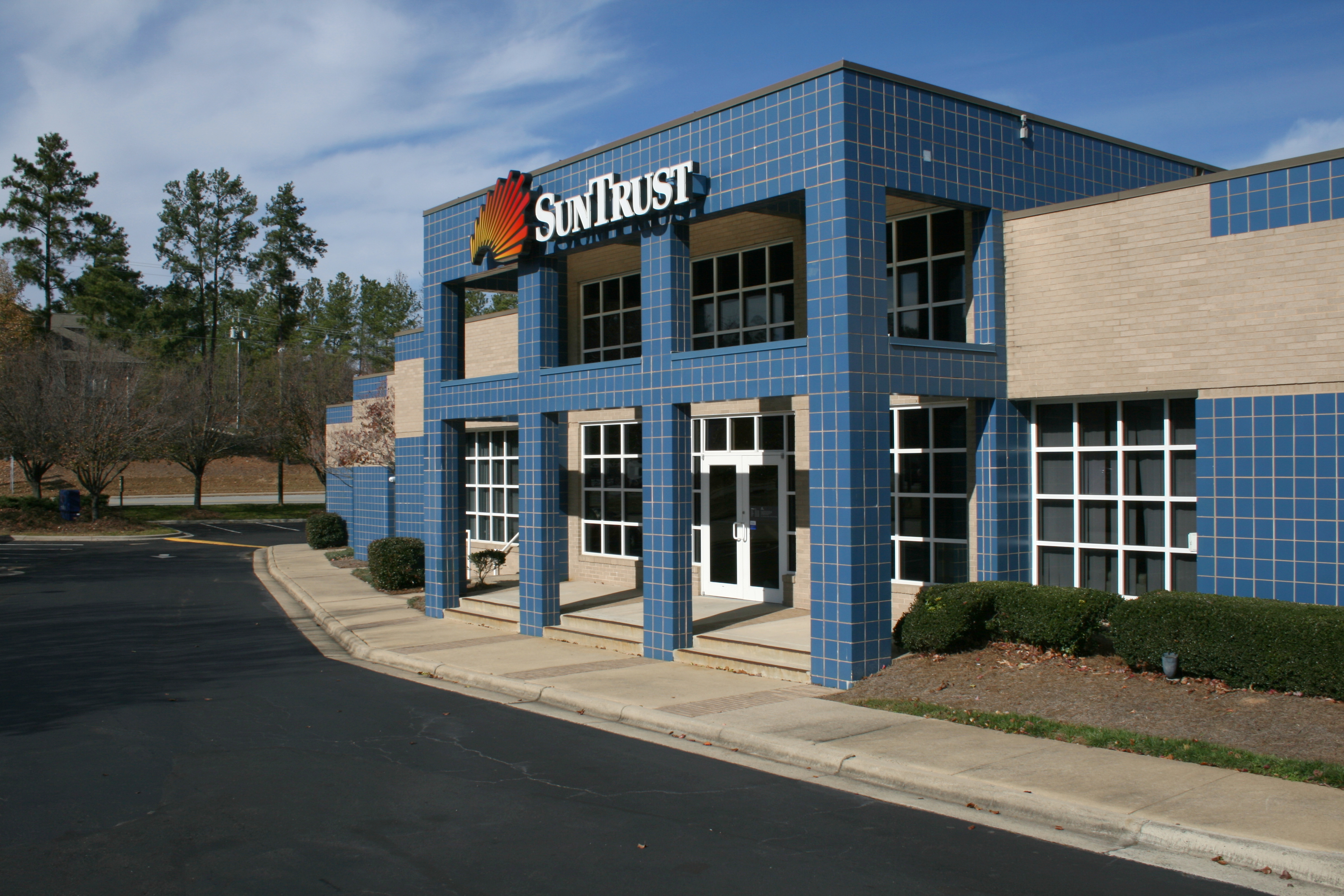
SunTrust branch in Durham, North Carolina

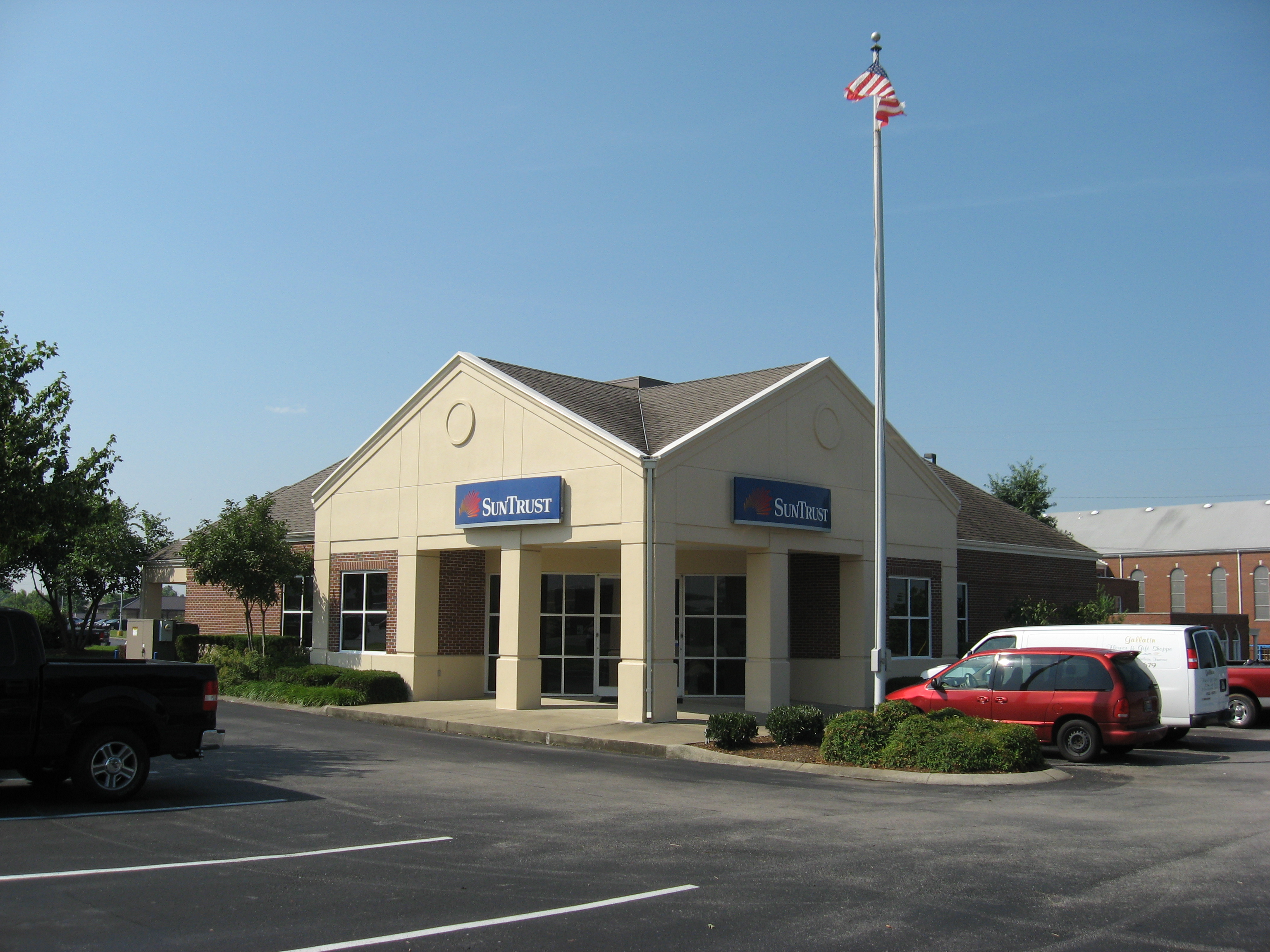
SunTrust Bank in Hendersonville, Tennessee

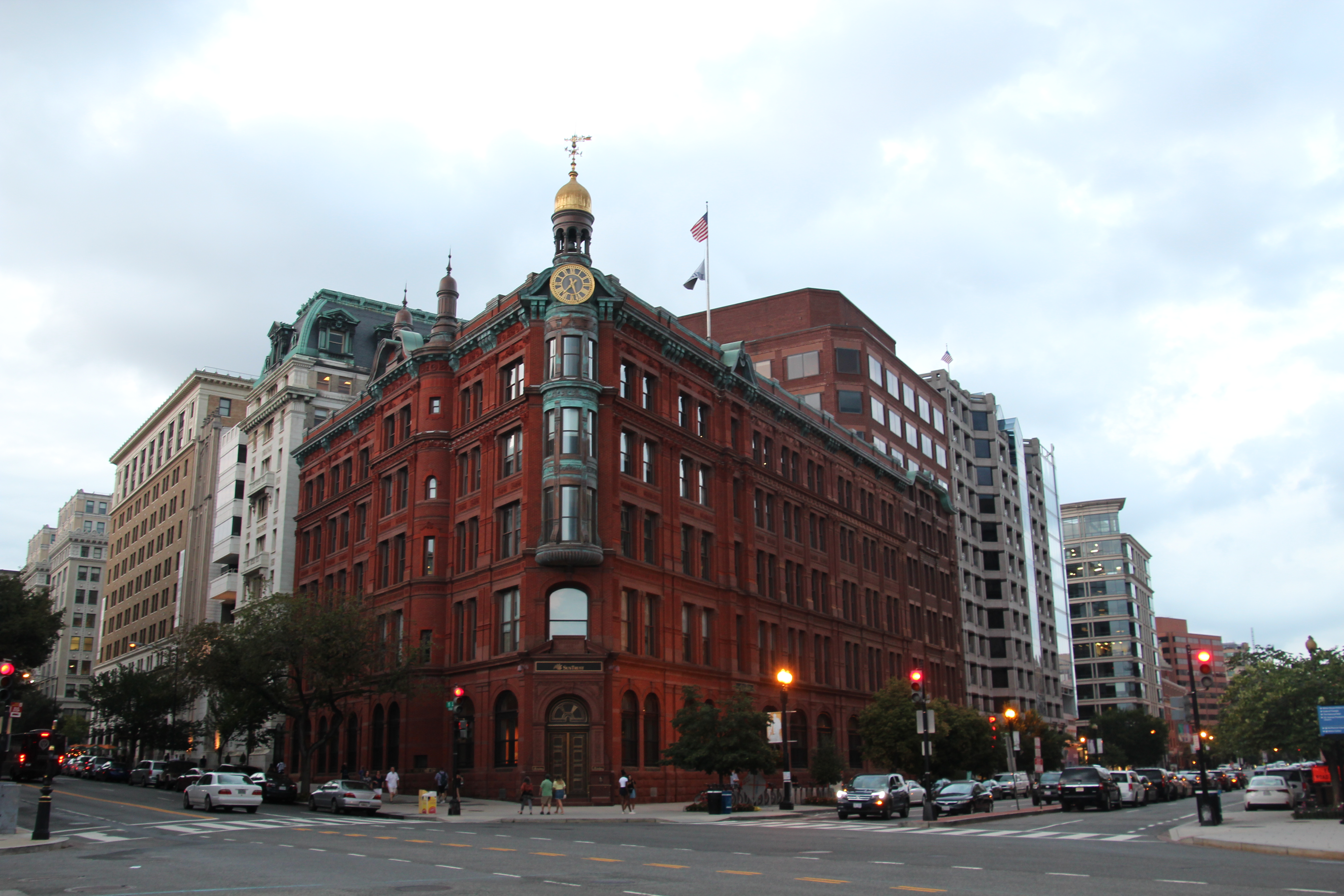
Fifteenth and New York Branch in Washington, D.C. (2018)

== See also ==
- 2019 SunTrust Bank shooting
