= Paul Murphy =

Paul Murphy may refer to:

== Sportspeople ==
- Paul Murphy (English footballer) (born 1954), English football player for Workington
- Paul Murphy (Derry Gaelic footballer) (born 1979), Irish Gaelic footballer
- Paul Murphy (Kerry Gaelic footballer) (born 1991), Irish Gaelic footballer
- Paul Murphy (hurler) (born 1989), Irish hurler

== Politicians ==
- Paul Murphy (Irish politician) (born 1983), Solidarity TD (Dublin South West) and former Socialist Party MEP
- Paul Murphy (Manitoba politician), Canadian politician
- Paul Murphy (Massachusetts politician) (1932–2020), American politician
- Paul F. Murphy (born 1932), American politician, member of the Massachusetts House of Representatives
- Paul Murphy, Baron Murphy of Torfaen (born 1948), Welsh Labour Party politician

== Others ==
- Paul Murphy (Australian journalist) (1942 or 1943–2020), Australian political journalist
- Paul Murphy (British journalist), founder editor of FT Alphaville
- Skratch Bastid (Paul Murphy, born 1982), Canadian hip hop DJ
- Paul Murphy (musician) (born 1949), jazz percussionist
- Paul Murphy, former lead singer of The Destroyers (band)
- Paul St. Clair Murphy (1850–1931), United States Marine Corps officer
- Paul B. Murphy Jr., American banker

== See also ==
- Paul Morphy (1837–1884), chess player
