= Cadence (disambiguation) =

A cadence is a melodic or harmonic configuration that creates a sense of resolution.

Cadence may also refer to:

== Arts and entertainment ==
=== Music ===
- Cadence (vocal group), a Canadian a cappella quartet
- Cadence rampa a Haitian music genre and origin of Cadence-lypso
- Drum cadence, a work played exclusively by the percussion section of a marching band
- Military cadence, a marching chant
- Cadence, the high school band of Chris Daughtry

=== Record labels ===
- Cadence Jazz Records, a record label associated with Cadence magazine
- Cadence Records, a 1940s/1950s American record label during the
- Cadence Music Group, formerly MapleMusic Recordings, a Canadian record label

=== Other uses in arts and entertainment ===
- Cadence (film), a 1990 film by Martin Sheen
- Cadence (magazine), a quarterly review of jazz, blues and improvised music
- Cadence (poetry), the fall in pitch of the intonation of the voice
- Cadance, a character in My Little Pony: Friendship is Magic; see List of My Little Pony: Friendship Is Magic characters § Shining Armor, Princess Cadance and Flurry Heart

== Businesses ==
- Cadence Bank, an American bank
  - Cadence Bank (1887–2021), a former company merged into this bank
- Cadence Biomedical, an American medical device company
- Cadence Design Systems, an American company
- Cadence Industries, an American conglomerate

== People ==
- Cadence (given name)

== Other uses ==
- Cadence (cycling), a measure of cycling pedalling rate (r/min)
- Cadence braking, a driving technique that involves pumping the brake pedal to improve braking performance in slippery conditions, a function now performed automatically by anti-lock braking systems (ABS)
- Cadence (gait), a measure of athletic performance
- Cadence (American football), the specific color-number-color-number pattern required to start every American football play and give instruction to the offensive line

== See also ==
- Cadenza (disambiguation)
- Cadence-lypso, a fusion of cadence and calypso dance music
- Cadence rampa, a dance music
