= Paul B. Murphy Jr. =

Former American banker

Paul B Murphy Jr.
- Born: Vicksburg, Mississippi
- Education: University of Texas at Austin (MBA)
- Occupation: Banker
- Years active: 1981–2023
- Employers: Cadence Bank (chairman and CEO); Amegy Bank (CEO)

Paul B Murphy Jr. is an American retired banker who served as the chief executive officer (CEO) and chairman of Cadence Bank from 2011 to 2021.

== Early life and education ==
Murphy was born in Vicksburg, Mississippi to a banking family. His grandfather Robert Preston Wailes served as a president of Merchants National Bank.

Murphy received his early education from Warren Central High School. He earned a bachelor's degree in finance from Mississippi State University in 1981 and later obtained a Master of Business Administration from the University of Texas at Austin in 1988.

== Career ==
=== 1981–1990: First Interstate Bank ===
Murphy began his career in 1981 at Allied Bank of Texas as a banker specializing in commercial lending. The bank was acquired by First Interstate in 1987. He continued to work for First Interstate until 1990 and prior to his departure he served as a vice president and manager of a commercial lending.

=== 1990–2009: Amegy Bank of Texas ===
In 1990, Murphy co-founded Southwest Bank of Texas and served as its executive vice president until 1995. He served as the president of Southwest Bank of Texas from 1995 to 2000. In 1997, the bank was listed on a stock exchange following an initial public offering. In 2000, he was appointed as its chief executive officer (CEO). The bank changed its name to Amegy Bank of Texas in 2005 and was later sold to Zions Bank for $1.7 billion after expanding from $75 million to approximately $8 billion in assets, making eight acquisitions during that period. He served as CEO of Amegy Bank of Texas until 2009.

=== 2010–2023: Cadence Bancorporation ===
In 2010, Murphy, along with a group of investors, raised $1 billion to acquire Cadence Bank and other small banks such as Encore Bank in Houston and Superior Bank, which lead to the formation of Cadence Bancorporation. He served as the chairman and CEO of Cadence Bank until its merger with BancorpSouth Bank in October 2021. During his tenure, the assets of the bank reached $18 billion and it was successfully listed on the New York Stock Exchange in 2017. As part of the merger, Murphy transitioned to the role of executive vice chairman of the new Cadence Bank.

In 2023, he retired from the bank, having moved into a consulting role with Cadence by the end of March 2023.

== Board memberships ==
Murphy has been a director of Oceaneering International, Inc., since August 2012.
