= Cadent =

Cadent can refer to:

- Cadent, "referring to cadence"
- Cadent (heraldry), an attitude on a blazon
- Cadent house in astrology
- Cadent Gas, a British regional gas distribution company based in Coventry
