= Balboa Capital Corporation =

Financing company based in Costa Mesa, California

Balboa Capital Corporation is a privately held independent financing company based in Costa Mesa, California.

== Background ==
Balboa Capital was launched as an equipment leasing company in 1988 by Patrick Byrne and Shawn Giffin, who were 22 years of age at the time and had graduated from University of Arizona one year prior. It was named after its first office on Orange County’s Balboa Island. Started with a $4,000 investment, Balboa Capital has grown into one of the largest privately held finance companies in the U.S., with a loan volume of about $250 million annually as of 2014.

Most of the firm’s business involves leasing arrangements and loans. They specialize in small business equipment loans. Most of the company's lending products are capped at $250,000, with loan terms ranging between three months and two years. Loans are unsecured. The company is a lender for the nationwide franchise expansions of Domino's Pizza and McAlister's Deli.

In 2014, the company opened a fourth office in Jacksonville, Florida, to expand its East Coast business. Balboa also has offices in Scottsdale, Arizona, San Ramon, California, and Spokane, Washington in addition to its Costa Mesa office.

A July 2015 article stated that the company added 155 new employees over the last year, and its business increased 77% in the prior quarter.

In December 2021, Ameris Bank, a subsidiary of Ameris Bancorp, acquired Balboa Capital Corporation.

== Recognition ==
After a sales growth of 2,652% between 1988 and 1992, Balboa Capital ranked #67 on Inc. Magazine's 1993 list of the 500 fastest growing private businesses in the country, and in 1997, the company was listed as #108 by Inc. Also in 1997, Byrne was one of ten Orange County executives who received entrepreneurship awards from the Ernst and Young accounting firm. In 2018, Business.com chose Balboa Capital as their best alternative lender for small business.
