= WaterLights District, Pearland, Texas =

WaterLights District was a planned development located in Pearland, Texas, United States, south of the city of Houston.

The development was to contain 1,900,000 square feet (180,000 m^{2}) of space; the development will include commercial, retail, and park developments.

Richard Browne, the developer, planned to include busts of the presidents of the United States in the development. He wished to make the place "the Venice of Houston." David Adickes, the sculptor of the busts, said that seven of the statues would each be four feet taller than the other statues because a consensus of historians believe that the presidents represented were "the best." The 48 acres (19 ha) site was purchased with $5 million in cash and a $10 million bank loan.

The Pearland City Council unanimously approved the creation of the development on March 24, 2008.

In March 2010 Amegy Bank posted the project for foreclosure. As of that month the project was worth about $5 million. The presidential heads, not a part of the foreclosure, were scheduled to be moved to a Houston Heights storage facility.

America Modern Green Development has since purchased the property and is planning a 48-acre mixed use community.
