= Atlantic Coast Financial =

Atlantic Coast Financial Corporation
- Type: Public
- Traded as: Nasdaq: ACFC
- Industry: Banking, Financial Services
- Predecessors: Atlantic Coast Federal Corporation, Atlantic Coast Federal MHC, Atlantic Coast Federal, Atlantic Coast Federal Credit Union
- Founded: Waycross, Georgia, U.S. (1939)
- Successors: Ameris Bancorp
- Headquarters: 4655 Salisbury Rd, Suite 110; Jacksonville, Florida, U.S.
- Area served: Northeast Florida; Southeast Georgia
- Key people: J.J. Dolan (Chairman); J.S. Sidhu (Vice Chairman); J.K. Stephens, Jr. (President and CEO); T.L. Keegan (Executive Vice President and CFO)
- Products: Personal banking Business banking
- Net income: US$ 6.4 million (for the year ended December 31, 2016)
- Total assets: ▲US$ 907.5 million (as of December 31, 2016)
- Total equity: ▲US$ 87.0 million (as of December 31, 2016)
- Number of employees: 174 (as of December 31, 2016)
- Website: atlanticcoastbank.net

Atlantic Coast Financial Corporation was an American publicly traded bank holding company headquartered in Jacksonville, Florida (a Maryland corporation) and listed on the NASDAQ Stock Market (Nasdaq: ACFC), which wholly owned Atlantic Coast Bank. In 2018, Ameris Bancorp completed its acquisition of Atlantic Coast Bank. The banks services were focused primarily on personal banking and business banking in the Northeast Florida, Central Florida and Southeast Georgia regions. The company has been recognized by the Jacksonville Business Journal as one of north Florida's "Best Places to Work" in both 2015 and 2016, and was also selected as one of Florida's "Best Companies" by Florida Trend Magazine in July 2016.

== Offices and branches ==
Atlantic Coast Bank maintains offices throughout Central and North Florida and Southeast Georgia. The company operates seven branches and one administrative office (which includes a stand-alone ATM) in Northeast Florida and three branches in Southeast Georgia. The Northeast Florida branches include Neptune Beach, Jacksonville Beach, the southside of Jacksonville, the westside of Jacksonville, Arlington, Julington Creek and Orange Park. The Southeast Georgia branches include two in Waycross and one in Douglas. In addition, Atlantic Coast Bank has mortgage and commercial loan production offices in Orlando, Florida, Gainesville, Florida, Tampa, Florida, Saint Petersburg, Florida, Saint Simons Island, Georgia and Savannah, Georgia, and has an SBA & USDA Lending office in Orlando, Florida, which funds small business loans throughout the Southeast U.S.

== Banking and financial services ==
Atlantic Coast Bank is a full service community bank operating three distinct lines of business: Commercial Banking, Retail (Branch) Banking, and Residential Mortgage Lending. The Bank's specific services include, but are not limited to, deposit accounts, mortgage loans, auto loans, personal loans, credit cards, commercial loans, USDA loans, SBA loans, warehouse lending, and wealth management.

== History ==
The bank first opened its doors in 1939 as Atlantic Coast Federal Credit Union in Waycross, Georgia, servicing the employees of the Atlantic Coast Line Railroad.

In November 2000, after receiving the necessary regulatory and membership approvals, Atlantic Coast Federal Credit Union converted to a federal mutual savings bank known as Atlantic Coast Federal. The conversion allowed Atlantic Coast Federal to diversify its customer base by marketing products and services to individuals and businesses within its market areas.

In January 2003, Atlantic Coast Federal Corporation was organized for the purpose of acquiring all of the capital stock that Atlantic Coast Federal issued upon its mutual holding company reorganization from the mutual to stock form of ownership. In October 2004, Atlantic Coast Federal Corporation completed a minority stock offering in which it sold 5,819,000 shares, or 40%, of its common stock to eligible depositors and Atlantic Coast Federal Corporation's Employee Stock Option Plan. The remaining majority of the 14,547,500 outstanding shares were owned by Atlantic Coast Federal, MHC, a federally chartered mutual holding company.

In July 2006, Atlantic Coast Federal, now a federally chartered stock savings association, was renamed Atlantic Coast Bank, to better reflect the nature of its operations.

In February 2011, the second step of the conversion from the mutual holding company structure was completed, along with a related public offering. As a result of the conversion, Atlantic Coast Federal, MHC and Atlantic Coast Federal Corporation, the holding companies of Atlantic Coast Bank, were merged into Atlantic Coast Financial Corporation, a Maryland corporation. Atlantic Coast Bank is 100% owned by Atlantic Coast Financial Corporation, and Atlantic Coast Financial Corporation is 100% owned by public stockholders (Nasdaq: ACFC).

In February 2013, Bond Street Holdings and its bank subsidiary, Florida Community Bank, attempted to acquire Atlantic Coast Financial Corporation and Atlantic Coast Bank. The deal was voted down by Atlantic Coast Financial Corporation's shareholders in June 2013.

In November 2013, the Board hired John K. Stephens, Jr., as president and CEO, to initiate a recapitalization and turnaround strategy. In December 2013, Atlantic Coast Financial Corporation raised $48.3 million in a public stock offering (Nasdaq: "ACFC") by issuing 12,880,000 shares of its common stock. Net proceeds from the public offering were $44.9 million, the majority of which was contributed to Atlantic Coast Bank to improve capital ratios, to support growth in the Bank's loan and investment portfolios, and for general corporate purposes. The company simultaneously divested the majority of its nonperforming assets, resulting in a recapitalized, clean balance sheet.

During 2014, the company started a residential mortgage lending group and restaffed its commercial bank. Additionally, in June 2015, the company restructured and refinanced over $160 million in long-term debt to reduce expenses and mitigate risk. These actions have contributed to the company's return to profitability and stability.

In December 2016, the Bank consummated the conversion of its charter from that of a federally-chartered savings bank to that of a Florida state-chartered commercial bank supervised by the Florida Office of Financial Regulation and the Federal Deposit Insurance Corporation.

Atlantic Coast Bank has been recognized by the Jacksonville Business Journal as one of north Florida's "Best Places to Work" in both 2015 and 2016, and John Stephens was named one of the region's "Ultimate CEOs". The company was also selected as one of Florida's "Best Companies" by Florida Trend Magazine in July 2016.

== Community Involvement ==
Atlantic Coast Bank supports the following organizations and initiatives in Northeast Florida, Central Florida and Southeast Georgia:

- United Way of America
- HabiJax, a local Habitat for Humanity program in Jacksonville, Florida
- Get Smart About Credit Day, an American Bankers Association Education Foundation program. The 2017 date is October 19.
- Teach Children to Save Day, an American Bankers Association Education Foundation program. The 2017 date is April 28.
- Kilwins Ice Cream Run, a 5K race (and 1 mile Fun Run/Walk) to benefit Clarke Schools for Hearing and Speech in Jacksonville, Florida (Bronze Sponsor in 2015)
