= Superior Bancorp =

- Industry: Banking
- Founded: 1997; 29 years ago
- Defunct: April 15, 2011; 15 years ago
- Fate: Bank failure; acquired by Cadence Bank
- Headquarters: Birmingham, Alabama
- Key people: C. Stanley Bailey, Chairman and CEO; James A. White, CFO
- Net income: ▲ -$0.019 billion (2009)
- Total assets: ▲$3.221 billion (2009)
- Total equity: ▼$0.191 billion (2009)
- Number of employees: 828 (2009)

Superior Bancorp was a bank holding company for Superior Bank, headquartered in Birmingham, Alabama. It had 73 branches in Alabama and Florida. In April 2011, it suffered from bank failure and its assets were acquired by an affiliate of Cadence Bank.

== History ==
The company was founded in 1997.

In December 1998, the company became a public company via an initial public offering.

On April 15, 2011, Superior Bank suffered from bank failure and its assets were acquired by an affiliate of Cadence Bank in a transaction facilitated by the Federal Deposit Insurance Corporation (FDIC).

The bank failure cost the FDIC more than $530 million. In 2014, the FDIC sued former executives of the Florida division of the bank, claiming they took "unreasonable financial risks" in making unsafe loans.
