= Synovus =

American financial services company

Synovus Financial Corp.

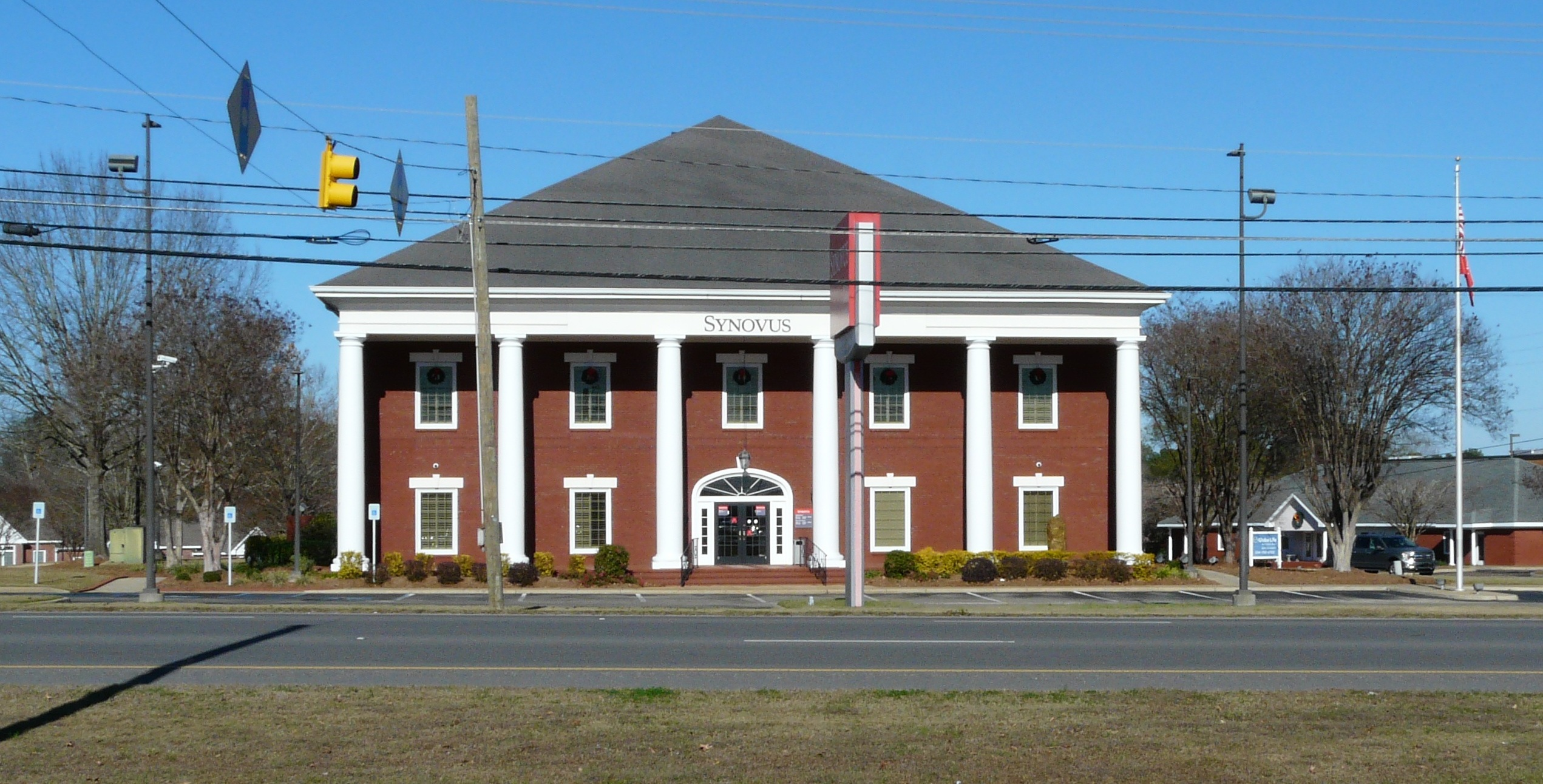
- branch in Dothan, Alabama
- Formerly: Columbus Bank and Trust Company (1888–2010)
- Traded as: NYSE: SNV
- Industry: Banks
- Founded: 1888; 138 years ago
- Defunct: January 2, 2026; 8 months ago (as an Independent Corporation)
- Fate: Acquired by Pinnacle Financial Partners
- Successor: Pinnacle Financial Partners
- Headquarters: Columbus, Georgia, U.S.
- Number of locations: 254 (2026)
- Key people: Kevin Blair (chairman & CEO)
- Products: Financial Services
- Revenue: ▼US$1.512 billion (2020)
- Net income: ▲US$1.986 billion (2022)
- Total assets: ▲US$55.386 billion (2022)
- Total equity: ▲US$3.134 billion (2018)
- Number of employees: 4,988 (2022)
- Website: synovus.com

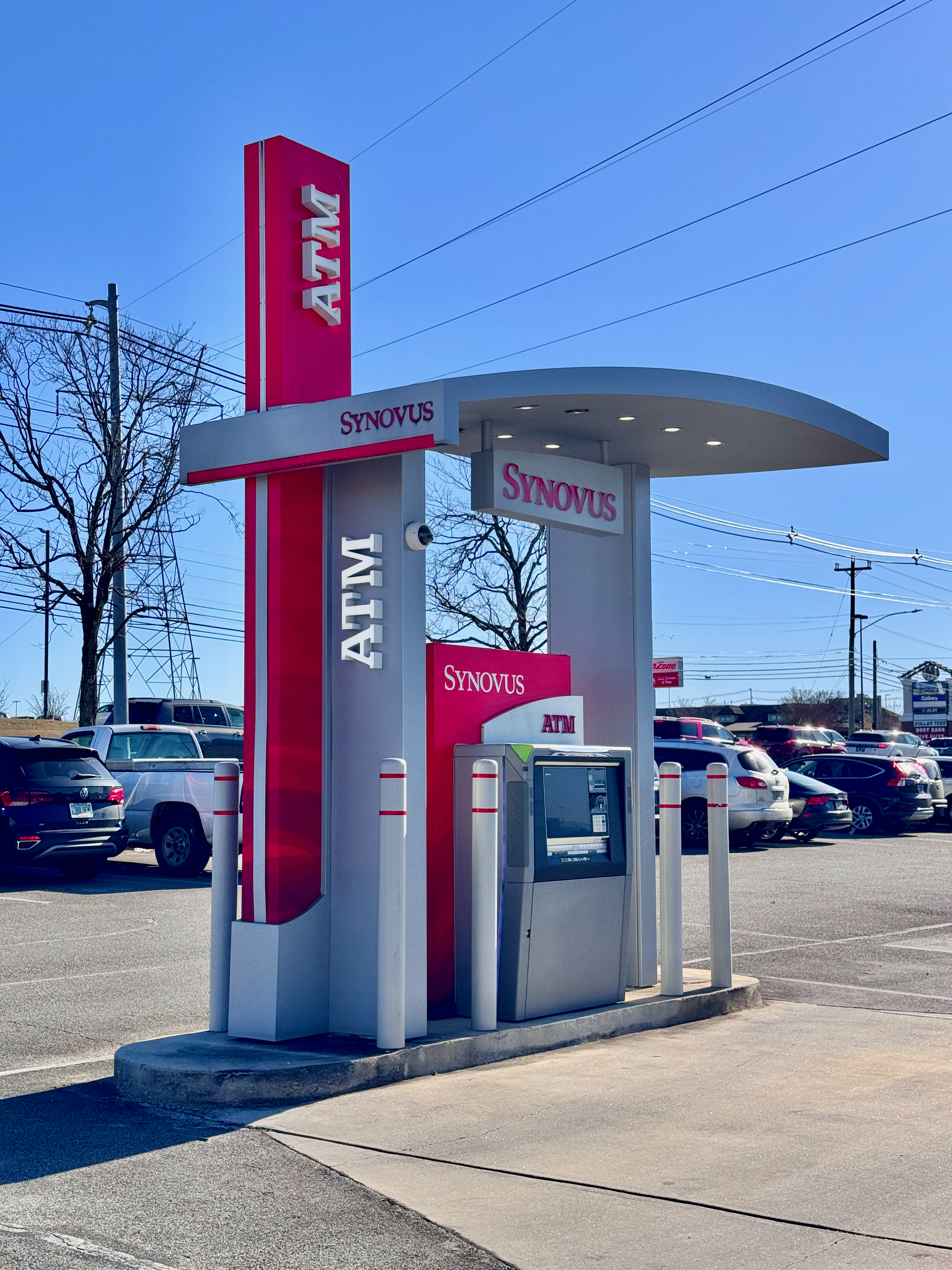
A Synovus ATM in Chattanooga, Tennessee

Synovus Financial Corp., formerly the Columbus Bank and Trust Company, is a financial services firm with approximately $62 billion in assets. Based in Columbus, Georgia, it provides commercial and retail banking, investment, and mortgage services through 249 branches and 335 ATMs in Georgia, Alabama, South Carolina, Florida, and Tennessee.

In July 2025, Pinnacle Financial Partners announced its intent to purchase Synovus in an $8.6 billion all-stock deal, thus creating the 28th largest lender in the US, with $116 billion in assets. In January 2026, it was announced that the two institutions had completed the merger of their operations.

== History ==
The bank opened in 1888 following an incident at a textile mill in which a worker's dress became entangled in machinery, spilling the money she had sewn into her hem onto the floor. After she explained to a factory executive that she had felt this was the safest place to keep her savings, he offered instead to secure her money in the mill safe and pay her interest on her balance. This service was soon offered to all company employees.

Synovus's founding parent company, Columbus Bank and Trust (CB&T), has deep roots in its hometown. CB&T started TSYS in 1959 and in 1974 the company began processing credit cards for other banks. In 1983, CB&T made TSYS a separate publicly traded company, retaining majority ownership.

On October 25, 2007, TSYS and Synovus (holding 81% of shares at the time) announced a spin-off that was completed as of the end of 2007. Synovus took its current name in 2010.

In August 2009, due to the 2008 financial crisis, the bank was listed as one of more than 150 United States lenders that owned nonperforming loans equal in value to 5% or more of their holdings, exceeding a threshold said to threaten its survival.

In early 2010, Synovus consolidated thirty separate state bank charters into one Georgia charter and began the transition toward operating as a more centralized bank. the company laid off 850 employees and closed many branches in early 2011.

In July 2013, it repaid $967.9 million borrowed under the Troubled Asset Relief Program. Beginning in late 2017 and ending in mid-2018, the firm transitioned from 28 locally-branded divisions to a single Synovus brand.

In January 2019, Synovus completed a $2.9 billion acquisition of FCB Financial Holdings, Inc., owner of Florida Community Bank. Branding to Synovus was expected during the second quarter of 2019.

The $8.6 billion merger of Synovus with Pinnacle Financial Partners was completed January 2, 2026, with the Synovus name used until 2027, when all branches will take the Pinnacle name.

== Acquisitions ==
Since its founding in 1888, it has acquired 35 banks.

- Alabama: Sterling Bank MONTGOMERY, The First National Bank of Jasper, First Commercial Bank of Huntsville, First Commercial Bank BIRMINGHAM, Community Bank and Trust of Southeast Alabama DOTHAN, The Bank of Tuscaloosa, CB&T Bank of East Alabama PHENIX CITY.
- Florida: Tallahassee State Bank, Synovus Bank SAINT PETERSBURG, Synovus Bank JACKSONVILLE, First Coast Community Bank FERNANDINA BEACH, Coastal Bank and Trust of Florida PENSACOLA.
- Georgia: Buena Vista Loan & Savings Bank, First United Bank MONTEZUMA, Bank of Manchester, Coastal Bank of Georgia BRUNSWICK, Sea Island Bank STATESBORO, SB&T BANK ALBANY, Georgia Bank & Trust CALHOUN, First State Bank and Trust Company of Valdosta, Commercial Bank & Trust Company of Troup County LAGRANGE, First Community Bank of Tifton, Commercial Bank THOMASVILLE, Citizens First Bank ROME, CB&T Bank of Middle Georgia WARNER ROBINS, AFB&T ATHENS, Bank of Coweta NEWNAN, Bank of North Georgia ALPHARETTA, Sunrise Bank VALDOSTA (as part of a government assisted transaction).
- South Carolina: The National Bank of South Carolina SUMTER.
- Tennessee: Cohutta Banking Company CHATTANOOGA, Trust One Bank MEMPHIS, The Bank of Nashville.
- Nebraska: World's Foremost Bank SIDNEY.
