= California Bank and Trust =

American bank

California Bank & Trust
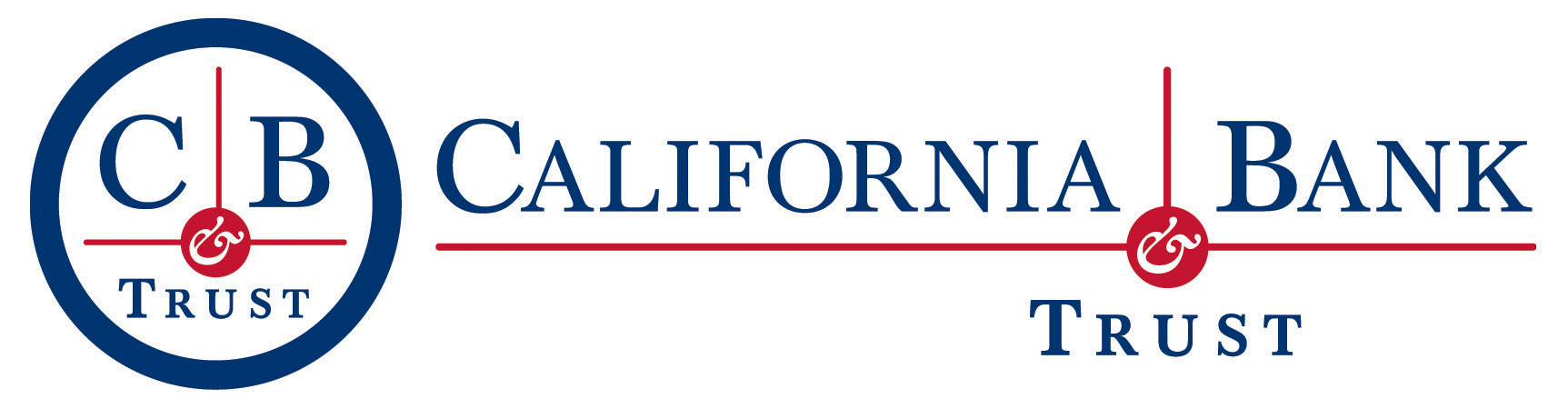
- Type: Subsidiary
- Industry: Banking
- Founded: 1952
- Headquarters: San Diego, California, United States
- Key people: Eric Ellingsen, President & CEO
- Total assets: $91 billion (2022)
- Parent: Zions Bancorporation
- Website: www.calbanktrust.com

California Bank & Trust (CB&T) is a full-service bank specializing in consumer, commercial, and wealth management services headquartered in San Diego, California. With more than 80 branches located across California and assets totaling $91 billion as of 2022, CB&T is a subsidiary of Zions Bancorporation, one of the nation's top 50 bank holding companies.

== History ==
California Bank & Trust was created in October 1998 as the result of the merger of three institutions acquired separately by Zions Bancorporation: Sumitomo Bank of California, San Diego–based Grossmont Bank, and First Pacific National Bank.

The bank continued to grow with the acquisition of Fresno, California–based Regency Bank in 1999. In 2001, the company expanded its footprint with the addition of Eldorado Bancshares, which included Eldorado's two subsidiaries, Eldorado Bank and Antelope Valley Bank.

Other acquisitions include Alliance Bank and Vineyard Bank, which were acquired when the Federal Deposit Insurance Corporation (FDIC) closed those institutions in 2009. Through this transaction, California Bank & Trust acquired Alliance Bank's $951 million of deposits and $1.14 billion of assets, and up to $225 million of the sold bank's credits.

In June 2025, the bank marked a major expansion by acquiring four FirstBank branches in the Coachella Valley, growing to six branches overall.

In mid-October 2025, Zions Bancorp reported that its CalBank&Trust subsidiary had been the victim of over $60 million in fraudulent loans, and that the bank was setting aside $50 to cover the loss. The result on the stock market was a 13% crash that meant nearly $1 billion in value being wiped from Zions' valuation in a single day; moreover the announcement provoked "contagion" throughout the regional banking industry amidst fears of bank collapses throughout the sector. .

== Operations ==
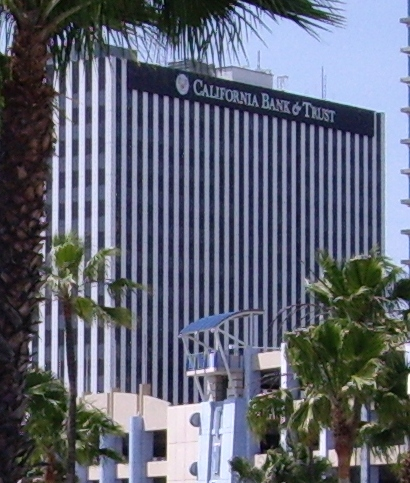
California Bank and Trust building in Long Beach, California

California Bank & Trust operates through a network of more than 80 branches run through four administrative offices. The offices include Irvine, Los Angeles, Oakland, and the bank's main headquarters in San Diego.

In November 2024, the bank moved its Los Angeles office to the Aon Center, the third tallest building in the city.

The CEO of California Bank & Trust is Eric Ellingsen. He also holds a seat on the Zions Bancorporation executive committee.
