= Fidelity Southern Corporation =

Former financial holding firm in Atlanta, Georgia

- Company type: Public
- Traded as: Nasdaq: LION
- Industry: Financial services
- Founded: 1973; 53 years ago
- Defunct: 2019
- Fate: Acquired
- Successor: Ameris Bancorp
- Headquarters: Atlanta, Georgia, United States
- Number of locations: 65 Branches (August 2017)
- Key people: James Miller (chairman); Palmer Proctor (president & CEO)
- Products: Retail Banking; Commercial Banking; Mortgage; SBA; Trust Services; Indirect Lending
- Operating income: ▲US$ 101,667 thousands (2014)
- Net income: ▲US$ 138,754 thousands (2014)
- Total assets: ▲US$ 3.1 billion (2014)
- Total equity: ▲US$ 264,951 million (2014)
- Number of employees: 1,117 (2014)
- Website: lionbank.com/southern

Fidelity Southern Corporation was an American financial holding company headquartered in Atlanta, Georgia. It wholly owned Fidelity Bank and the LionMark Insurance Company. It was acquired by Ameris Bancorp in July 2019.

As of 2014, the company had $3.1 billion in total assets, $265.0 million in total stockholders' equity, $2.5 billion in deposits and $2.6 billion in total loans.

Fidelity Bank provides an array of financial products and services for business and retail customers primarily in the metropolitan Atlanta and northern Florida markets. Various types of loans were also offered by the bank.

== History ==
The bank was founded in DeKalb County in 1973 with the Fidelity Southern Corporation and Fidelity National Mortgage Corporation, formed in 1979.

Fidelity founded a brokerage firm in 1992.

On October 31, 1994, Fidelity Southern Corporation began trading on NASDAQ under the symbol "LION."

Fidelity Bank acquired Decatur First Bank in 2011, the Security Exchange Bank in 2012, The Bank of Georgia in 2015, and American Enterprise Bank in 2017.

In July 2019, Ameris Bancorp merged with Fidelity Bank.
