= Great Florida Bank =

Bank in Miami Lakes, Florida

- Genre: Financial services
- Founded: 2004
- Founder: M. Mehdi Ghomeshi
- Defunct: January 31, 2014
- Headquarters: Coral Gables, Florida, United States
- Area served: Miami-Dade County, Broward County, Palm Beach County
- Total assets: $1.56 billion (Dec. 2010)
- Website: greatfloridabank.com

Great Florida Bank (OTCQB: GFLB), headquartered in Miami Lakes, Florida was established on June 30, 2004 as a state-charted commercial bank. The bank was listed on the NASDAQ Global Market (GFLB) on December 5, 2007 and joined the American Bankers Association Community Bank Index in June 2008. At the end of 2009, it was the 11th-largest South Florida-based bank by assets. As of April 13, 2010, according to a consent order filed with the Federal Deposit Insurance Corp. the bank is required to raise additional capital. On January 31, 2014, Weston-based Florida Community Bank acquired Great Florida Bank elevating its status to the fourth largest bank headquartered in Florida, with about $5 billion in assets and more than 60 locations along both Florida coasts and in the Orlando area.

== History ==
M. Mehdi Ghomeshi, who began his banking career with Barnett Bank until its sale to NationsBank in 1998, founded Great Florida Bank in 2004. In December 1998, Ghomeshi became president and a director of BankUnited, FSB, and served in that capacity until April 15, 2001 when he became Executive Vice Chairman. Ghomeshi left BankUnited in November 2002.

== Bank operations ==
The bank operates twenty-eight "Solution Centers" located throughout Miami-Dade, Broward and Palm Beach Counties. Great Florida Bank participates in the FDIC's Temporary Liquidity Guarantee Program which provides unlimited Federal Deposit Insurance Corporation (FDIC) coverage on all non-interest bearing transaction account balances through December 31, 2009.

In 2004, Great Florida Bank opened in downtown Miami, and continued its expansion out of Miami area in 2005 and 2006, when it opened several locations in South Florida. However, in 2006, the bank was served with a FDIC cease and desist order citing unsafe and unsound banking practices and violations of the Bank Secrecy Act; Notwithstanding the cease and desist order, the bank was successfully listed on the NASDAQ Global Market on December 5, 2007. The FDIC order was lifted in March 2009. In 2008, the bank opened seven new outlets in South Florida, giving the bank a total of 28 centers in that area.

Great Florida Bank joined the American Bankers Association Community Bank Index in June 2008. Great Florida Bank surpassed $1 billion in assets after only eighteen months in operation; at the time, that made it one of the fastest growing de novo institutions in the country.

As of 31 March 2009, the bank operated 28 outlets located throughout Miami-Dade, Broward and Palm Beach Counties; total assets were $1.7 billion, Tier 1 Capital was $131 million, and the Tier 1 Leverage ratio was 7.4% -- 48% above the federal regulatory definition of a "Well Capitalized Bank."

In January 2010, NASDAQ informed the Miami Lakes-based bank (NASDAQ: GFLB) that its common stock traded below the required level for 30 consecutive business days, and warned of a possible delisting if the share price continued to trade below the $1.00 threshold. The company's shares traded at $2.29 on 27 January 2009, and hit a 52-week low of $0.49 on 31 December 2009. As of 31 March 2010, the bank was out of compliance with its capital ratios, which were 5.55% for Tier 1 leverage capital ratio and 10.6% for total risk-based capital ratio. On 13 April 2010, the bank signed a consent order with the FDIC, requiring it to increase its Tier 1 leverage capital ratio to 8%, and a total risk-based capital ratio of 12%, within 120 days.

Still faced with capital adequacy pressures, the bank failed to meet its deadline from its regulators to raise capital by November 2010.

== Acquisition ==
On January 17, 2014, Florida Community Bank received regulatory approval from the Office of the Comptroller of the Currency to acquire Great Florida Bank. M. Mehdi Ghomeshi, president and chief executive officer of Great Florida Bank, said, "This merger is a win for our stockholders, customers and banking franchise. This business combination significantly enhances our combined abilities to be one of the financially strongest and most competitive community banking organizations in Florida. We are confident that this merger is a highly attractive strategic alignment for all of our constituents." Florida Community Bank acquired Great Florida Bank effective as of the close of business on January 31, 2014.
