= Florida Community Bank =

Former Bank based in Weston, Florida

- Formerly: First Bank of Immokalee (1923–1996); Florida Community Bank (1996–2010, 2011–2019); Premier American Bank (2001–2011)
- Company type: Private
- Industry: Banking; Financial services Investment services
- Predecessor: Florida Community Bank (1923–2010); Premier American Bank (2001–2010)
- Founded: July 7, 1923; 102 years ago (as First Bank of Immokalee); September 4, 2001; 24 years ago (as Premier American Bank); January 22, 2010; 16 years ago (Merger, as Premier American Bank)
- Defunct: January 1, 2019; 7 years ago
- Fate: Acquired by Synovus Financial
- Successor: Synovus (now Pinnacle Financial Partners)
- Headquarters: Immokalee, Florida (1923–2010); Miami, Florida (2001–2012); Weston, Florida (2012–2019)
- Number of locations: 54 (2018)
- Area served: Florida, Alabama, Georgia, South Carolina, Tennessee
- Key people: Kessel Stelling (Chairman & CEO); J. Bart Singleton (President)
- Products: Finance and insurance Consumer Banking; Corporate Banking; Investment Banking; Mortgages
- Total assets: ▲US$ 9 billion (January '17)
- Total equity: ▲US$ 480 million (December '13)
- Number of employees: 552 (December 2013)
- Website: www.floridacommunitybank.com

Florida Community Bank, also known as FCB, was an American bank based in Weston, Florida that provided consumer and business banking services to communities throughout the state. With roots tracing back to 1923, the legacy Florida Community Bank was the first bank established in Collier County. In January 2010, Florida Community Bank was purchased by Bond Street Holdings Inc, a Weston-based holding company with over $740 million in capital. The acquisition allowed the new Florida Community Bank to leverage its name and presence throughout the state of Florida.

Through acquisitions of failed banks, and organic growth, Florida Community Bank continued to expand its branch network and serviced three of the top four largest Metropolitan Statistical Areas (MSA) in Florida; Orlando, Miami and West Palm Beach. Reaching $9 billion in assets, Florida Community Bank had grown to become the fourth-largest independent Florida-based bank with 54 banking centers.

In addition to the purchase of Florida Community Bank, Bond Street Holdings also acquired eight additional Florida-based banks which include Premier American Bank, Peninsula Bank, Sunshine State Community Bank, First National Bank of Central Florida, Cortez Community Bank, Coastal Bank, First Peoples Bank, and Great Florida Bank.

In January 2019, Florida Community Bank was acquired by Synovus.

== History ==
In late 2009, Bond Street Holdings Inc. raised $440 million through a private placement and made its first two acquisitions in January 2010: Premier American Bank, based in Miami, and Florida Community Bank in Immokalee. That year, the holding company raised an additional $300 million through a second private placement, with about 50 percent of which came from existing shareholders. The bank's third acquisition came in June 2010: Peninsula Bank, based in Englewood. Then, Sunshine State Community Bank, based in Port Orange, in February 2011; and both First National Bank of Central Florida, based in Winter Park and Cortez Community Bank, based in Brooksville, in April 2011. They were followed by Coastal Bank, based in Cocoa Beach, in May 2011 and First Peoples Bank, based in Port St. Lucie, in July 2011. That month, the bank re-branded itself from Premier American Bank to Florida Community Bank. The name had a rich history as the state's oldest bank, founded in 1923. It also had the largest share of households at that time, 25,000, which allowed for less disruption for customers.

During 2012, the bank moved its headquarters to Weston, Florida and focused on integration and organic growth. Early in 2013, the Bank unsuccessfully attempted to acquire Atlantic Coast Financial Corporation and its banking subsidiary, Atlantic Coast Bank, as the deal was voted down by Atlantic Coast Financial Corporation's shareholders in June 2013. In July 2013, Florida Community Bank announced it would acquire troubled Great Florida Bank, which was completed January 2014.

== External link ==
- Official website
