= Willbros Group =

Willbros Group, Inc.
- Company type: Public
- Traded as: NYSE: WG
- Industry: Construction
- Founded: 1908
- Founders: William Brothers Company, Miller & David Williams
- Defunct: 2018
- Fate: acquired
- Headquarters: Five Post Oak Park; Houston, Texas, United States
- Services: Energy infrastructure services. Electric services include high voltage power lines, substations. Oil & Gas services include pipeline, pipeline integrity, and facility construction.
- Number of employees: 10,000
- Website: www.willbros.com

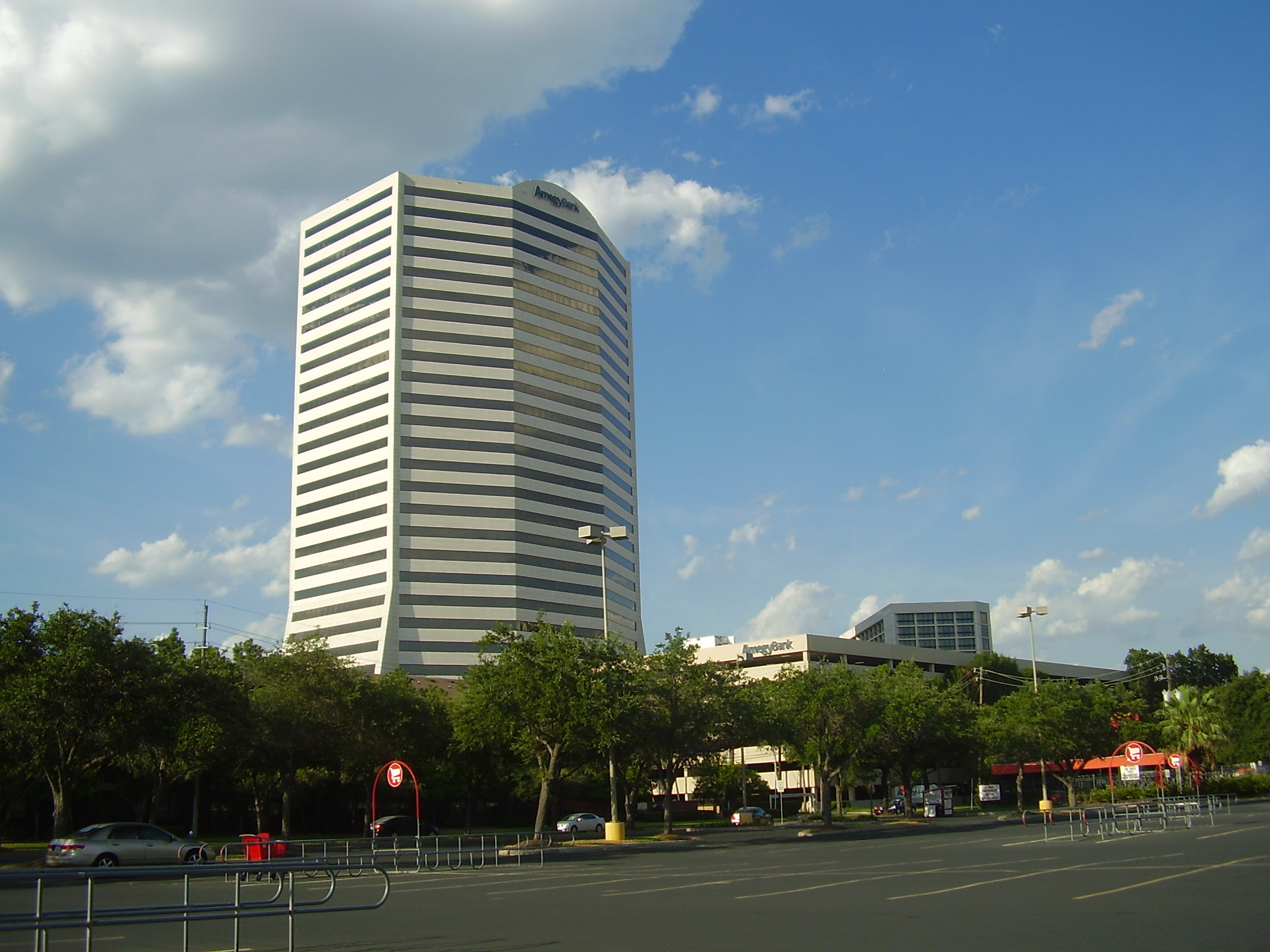
Five Post Oak Park, the company's headquarters

Willbros Group, Inc. was a global engineering and contractor company based in Houston, Texas, United States. It is listed on the New York Stock Exchange. The company operates in the field of energy infrastructure services. Willbros provides engineering, procurement and construction, such as refinery turnarounds, pipeline construction, pipeline integrity management, GIS consulting, and other specialty services.

Willbros was founded by Williams Brothers Company, founded by Miller & David Williams, in 1908. It is organized under the laws of Panama. It was reorganized as a public company in 1996. Originally headquartered in Tulsa, Oklahoma, the company moved to Houston, Texas, in 2000. In 2006, Willbros discontinued its operations in Nigeria and Venezuela, although in 2004, Nigeria accounted about 25% of company's global revenue. This decision was due to political instability and the militant attacks in Nigeria. Before making this decision, nine Willbros' workers were taken hostage by Nigerian militants.

On 28 February 2005, Willbros Group Inc., said that it was restating financial reports from 2002 on and forecast 2005 earnings far below Wall Street estimates. The adjustments would lower 2002 profit by $900,000, widen the 2003 loss by $2.6 million.

On 14 May 2008, the United States Securities and Exchange Commission filed a suit against Willbros Group and its former managers due to multiple violations of the Foreign Corrupt Practices Act in Nigeria, Ecuador and Bolivia in 2003–2005. Willbros agreed to pay US$32.3 million in penalties while two of its former managers were sentenced to more than a year in prison.

In 2010, Willbros expanded its activities from the oil and gas industry services to the electric transmission and distribution market by the acquisition of InfrastruX Group for about $480 million.

In September 2011, Standard & Poor's lowered Willbros Group's credit ratings to B+ with a negative outlook.

In November 2015, it was announced Michael Fournier was named chief executive officer. Fournier was the Chief Operating Officer before being appointed to this post.

In March 2018, Primoris Services Corporation announced that it will acquire Willbros Group, with the transaction expected to be completed in the second quarter of 2018.

== See also ==
- List of oilfield service companies
