= Cadenza (disambiguation) =

Cadenza is an improvised or written-out ornamental passage in music played or sung by a soloist or soloists.

Cadenza may also refer to:

- Cadenza (album), an album by the British band Dutch Uncles.
- Cadenza (choir), a mixed-voice chamber choir based in Edinburgh, founded in 1992.
- Cadenza (University of Cambridge), a mixed a cappella choir at Cambridge University, founded in 1997.
- Cadenza Interactive, developer of the game Sol Survivor.
- Cadenza Pianos - a piano manufacturer specialising at installing outdoor pianos.
- Kia Cadenza, a car.
- Maestro Cadenza, a character in the 2017 film adaptation of Beauty and the Beast.
- The Cadenza, a magazine from the late 19th and early 20th Centuries, devoted to the banjo, mandolin and guitar.
- Mi Amore Cadenza, royal name for Princess Cadance, a character in My Little Pony: Friendship is Magic.

== See also ==
- Cadence (disambiguation)
- Credenza
