= Premier American Bank =

- Industry: Banking; Financial services
- Defunct: January 22, 2010
- Fate: Closed by the Florida Office of Financial Regulation
- Successor: Florida Community Bank
- Headquarters: Miami, Florida, United States
- Area served: Florida

Premier American Bank was an American bank that operated in Miami, Florida until it was closed by the Florida Office of Financial Regulation on January 22, 2010. It had provided consumer and business banking services to communities throughout Florida.

The Federal Deposit Insurance Corporation (FDIC) assumed control, then entered into a purchase and assumptions agreement with Bond Street Holding.

The remaining operations of the bank changed its name to Florida Community Bank in July 2011.

== History ==
In July 2011, the bank changed its name to Florida Community Bank N.A.
