= Cadence (given name) =

Female given name

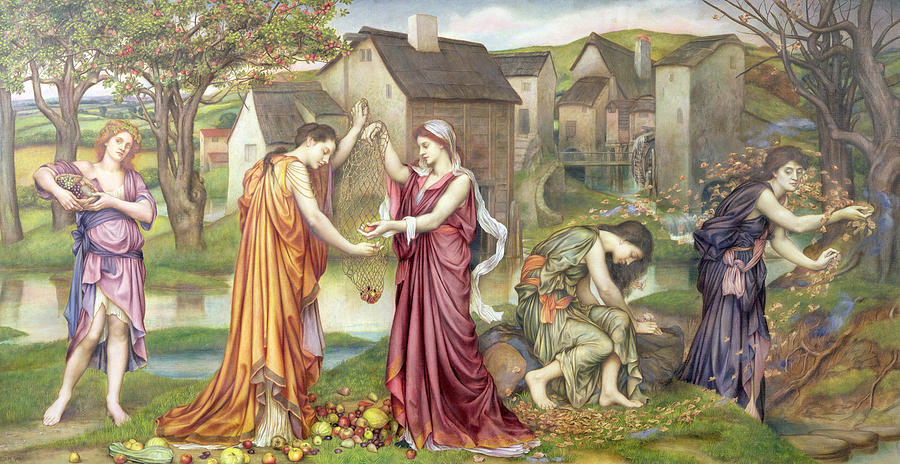
- The Cadence of Autumn by Evelyn De Morgan.

Origin
- Origin: English
- Meaning: "rhythmic, flowing" (English) or "falling" (Latin)

Other names
- Nicknames: Caddie, Caddy, Cady, Cade, Cad, Caden

Cadence or Kaydence is a feminine given name derived from the English word cadence, from the Latin for "a falling". The meaning of this name is considered to be "rhythm" from the borrowed use from musical terminology to describe rhythm in the spoken word. It rose quickly in popularity in the US in 2003 at the same time as a character named Cadence Flaherty (played by January Jones) was featured in the American Pie movie franchise. It reached a peak of popularity in 2005 where it ranked 207th most popular name for girls.

In 2011 the Kaydence spelling overtook Cadence as the most popular spelling given to babies that year, ranking 262nd. Kadence is also a popular spelling in the US.

== People with the name ==
- Cadence Weapon, Canadian rapper
- Cadence Spalding, American educator and musician
- Cadence Brace, Canadian tennis player

=== Fictional characters ===
- Princess Cadence from My Little Pony: Friendship is Magic
- Cadence Flaherty, character from American Wedding
- Cadence, video game character from Crypt of the NecroDancer
- DJ Cadence, video game character from Club Penguin
