= Five Post Oak Park =

Skyscraper in Houston, Texas

Coordinates: 29.7478°N 95.4516°W

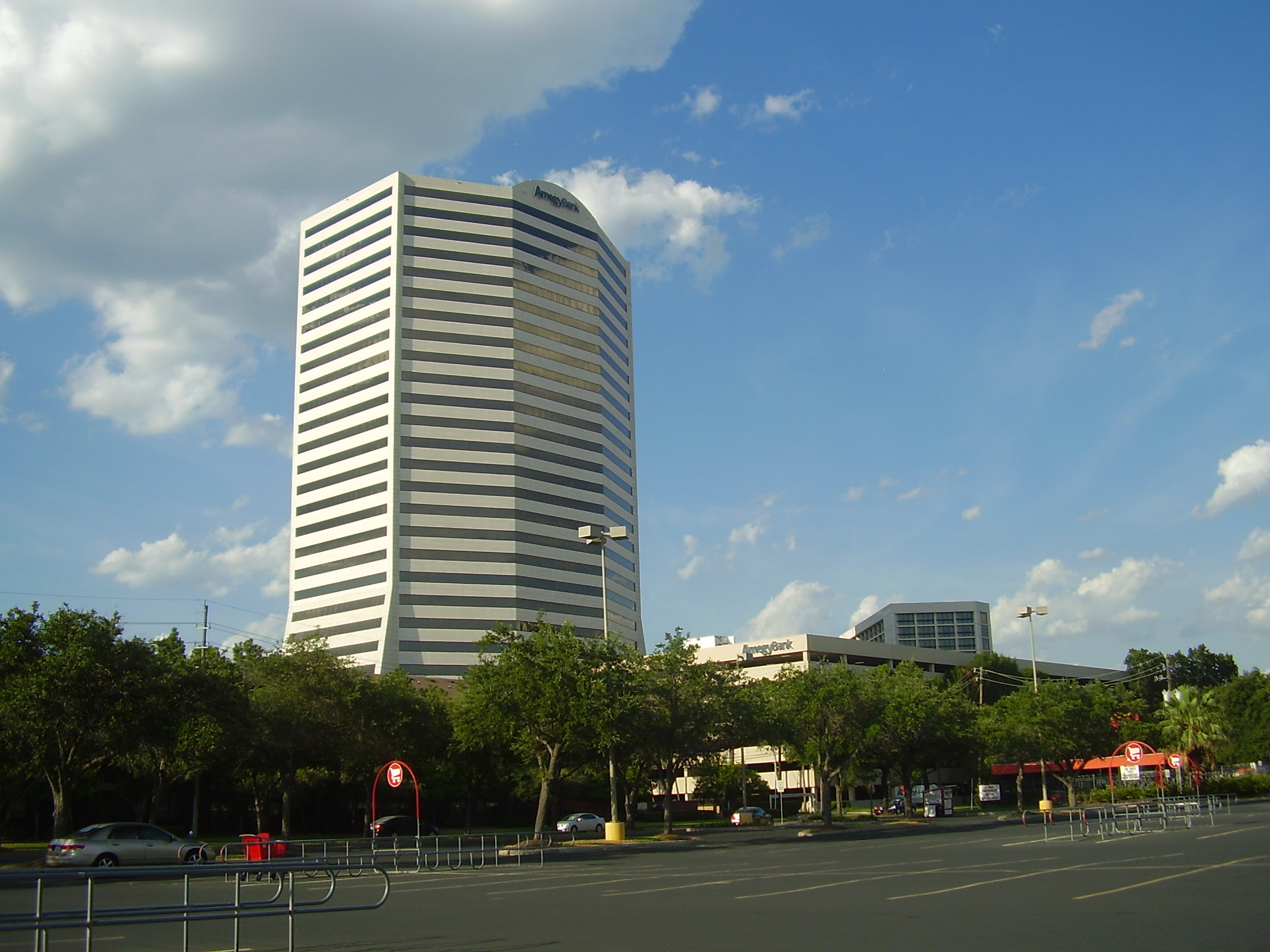
Five Post Oak Park

Five Post Oak Park is a skyscraper in Houston, Texas. The building, with Class A office space, has the headquarters of Amegy Bank and Willbros Group.

== Location ==
Five Post Oak Park is located in the 43 acres (17 ha) Post Oak Park business park. Originally developed by The Winter Company and completed in 1982, Five Post Oak Park is a 28-story building on 3.8 acres (1.5 ha) of land. It has 567,396 square feet (52,712.8 m^{2}) of rentable space and a 1,673-stall parking garage. It is located in proximity to Uptown and inside the 610 Loop. The building is in proximity to River Oaks and Tanglewood.

== History ==
The building was completed in 1982.

Prior to 1996 Heritage Bank leased about 10,000 square feet (930 m^{2}) of space on two floors in Five Post Oak Park; the bank had one street-level sign indicating its presence. In 1996 Five Post Oak Park was owned by Metropolitan Life Insurance Co. For a two-year period ending in 1996, Amegy Bank, which had its headquarters in the ICA Center, across the street from Five Post Oak Park, was searching for a location for its new headquarters. In 1996 Amegy decided to switch places with Heritage Bank. By July 1996 the two banks signed lease agreements with their new landlords. After Amegy moved to Five Post Oak Park, it initially received 80,000 square feet (7,400 m^{2}) of space while it had an option for more space. In addition the move allowed Amegy increased signage space and it allowed both banks to retain their offices in the vicinity of Uptown. The bank initially leased five floors and placed signs on both sides of the building and on the ground level. The bank also gained a five lane drive through facility.

In 2002 Crescent Real Estate and an affiliate of GE Pension Trust bought Five Post Oak Park for $65 million. GE Pension Trust had a 70% interest and Crescent had a 30% interest; in addition Crescent provided leasing services and property management. At the time the building was 82% leased to a mix of publicly traded companies and private companies; the public companies took 80% of the leased area. In 2003 Adams Resources & Energy renewed its lease for 20,730 square feet (1,926 m^{2}) of space.

In 2008 Shorenstein Properties bought the building from the partnership between Crescent Real Estate Equities and GE Asset Management. During that year the building was 93% leased. Amegy Bank, UBS, and Willbros USA together had 50% of the leasable space.

CP Group, formerly Crocker Partners, purchased Five Post Oak Park in 2021. The transaction was the commercial real estate firm's first in the Houston market since 2014, highlighting the firm's optimism of the CBD. Shortly after the acquisition, it was announced that national CPA and advisory firm Weaver and Tidwell, L.L.P. had signed a lease to occupy 60,000 SF in the office building as its new Houston headquarters.

== Contents ==
Tanya Rutledge of the Houston Business Journal said in 1996 that the building was "posh." The ground floor has a restaurant. The second floor has Five Post Oak Park's main elevator lobby and a skybridge connection to the parking garage. Twin travertine stairwells connect the two floors. The building has twelve self-service elevators that serve different portions of the building and one freight elevator on the west side of the building that serves all floors.

The seven-story garage has 1,673 stalls, three elevators, and a 2.95-square-foot (0.274 m^{2}) per 1,000 square feet (93 m^{2}) parking ratio. The ground level has bicycle parking.

== Tenants ==
Aside from having the headquarters of Amegy Bank, Five Post Oak Park also has a branch of the bank.
