= Zions Bancorporation =

U.S. financial services company

- Type: Public company
- Traded as: Nasdaq: ZION; S&P 400 component
- Industry: Financial services
- Founded: October 1, 1873; 153 years ago
- Founder: Brigham Young
- Headquarters: Salt Lake City, Utah, United States
- Key people: Harris H. Simmons (Chairman and CEO); Scott J. McLean (President and COO); R. Ryan Richards (CFO)
- Revenue: ▲US$2.705 billion (2022)
- Net income: ▼US$907 million (2022)
- Total assets: ▼US$89.545 billion (2022)
- Total equity: ▼US$4.893 billion (2022)
- Owner: Harris H. Simmons (1.04%)
- Number of employees: 9,989 (December 2022)
- Website: zionsbancorporation.com

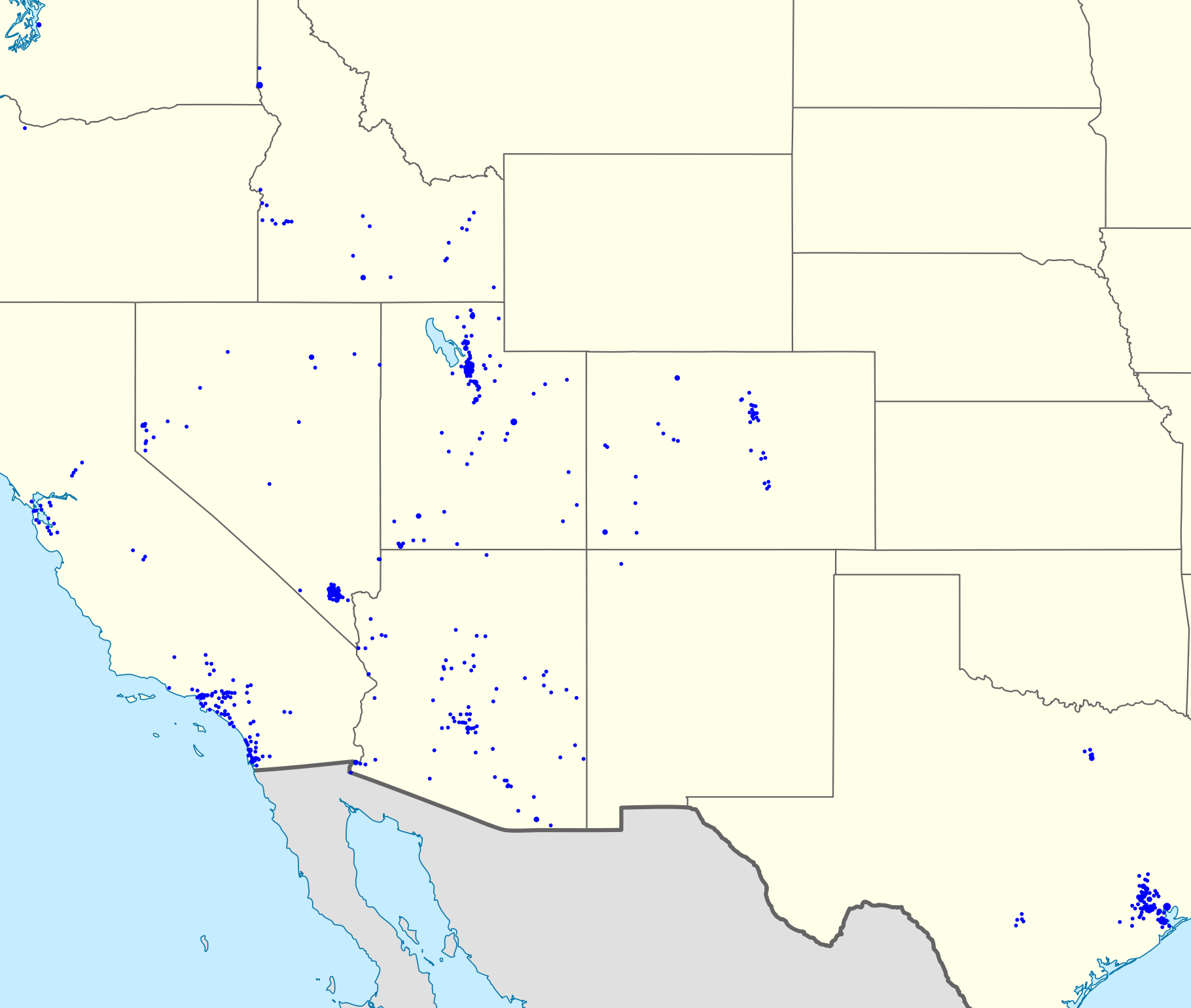
Zions retail footprint

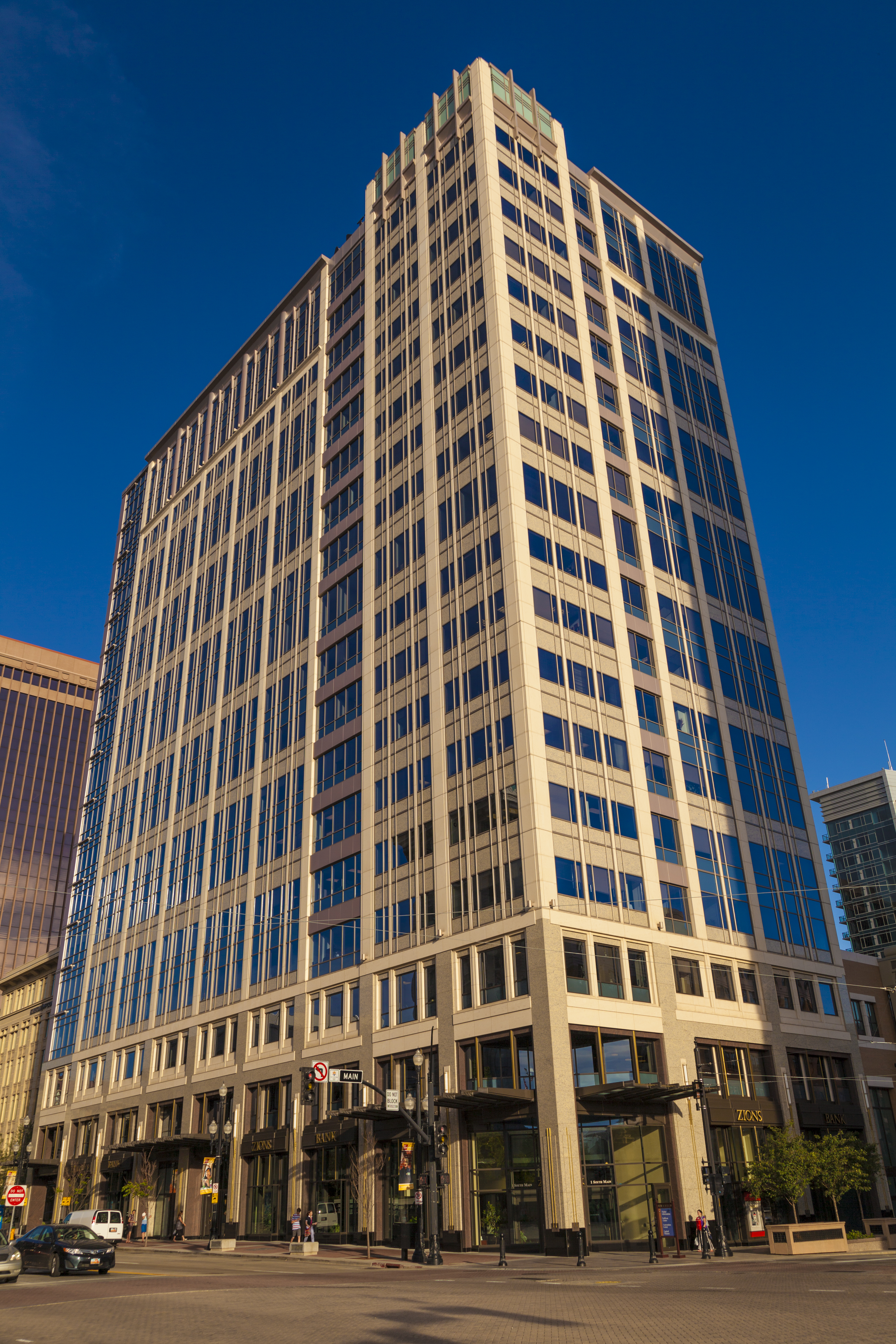
Zions Bank tower in Salt Lake City, Utah.

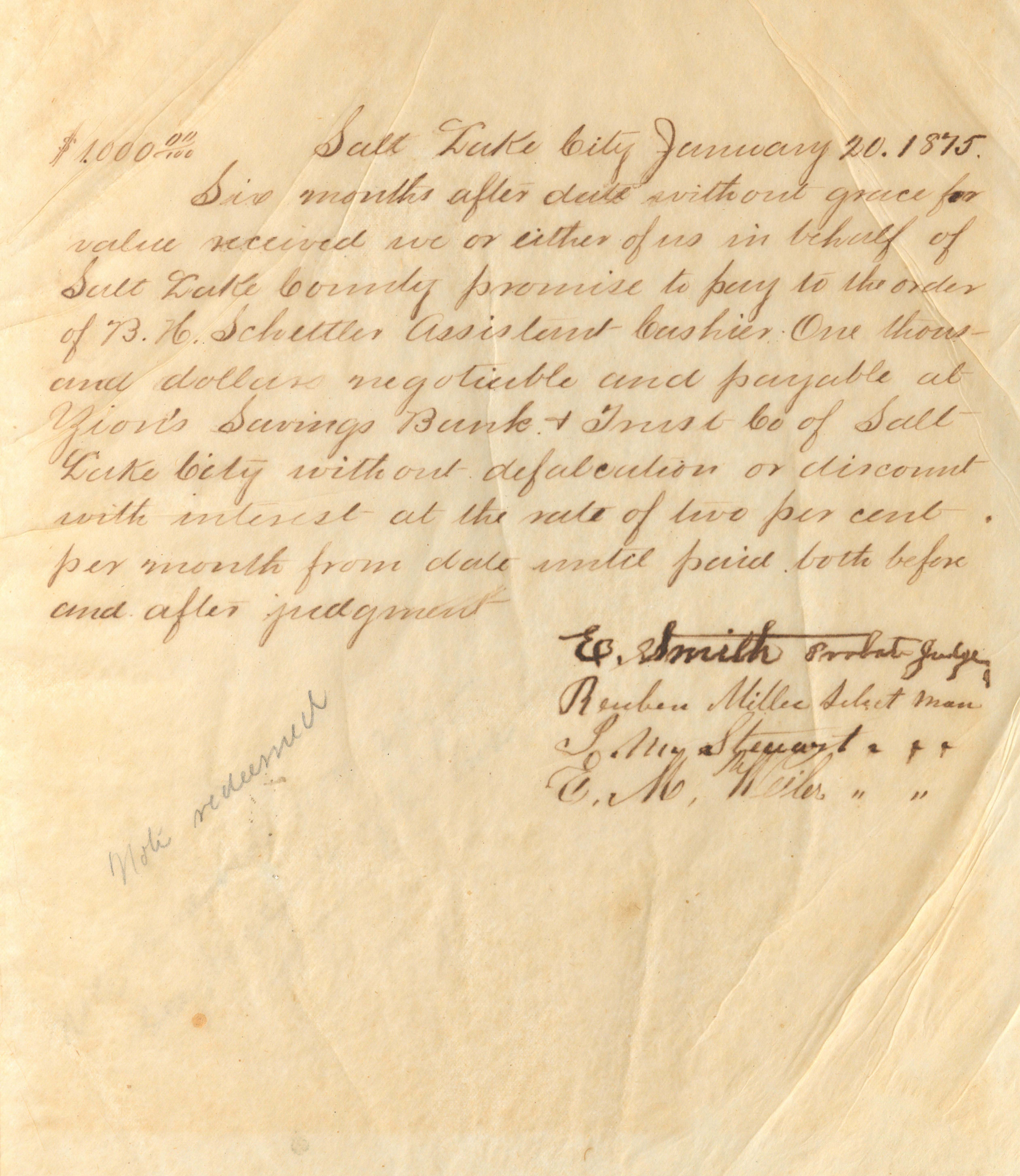
A very early Salt Lake County Probate Court record documenting a business promissory note for Zion's Bank, January 20 1875.

Zions Bancorporation is an American national bank headquartered in Salt Lake City, Utah. It operates as a national bank rather than as a bank holding company and does business under the following seven brands: Zions Bank, Amegy Bank of Texas, California Bank and Trust, National Bank of Arizona, Nevada State Bank, Vectra Bank Colorado, and the Commerce Bank of Washington.

As of 2023, it had 416 branches and over 1 million customers, mostly in the western United States. It was founded by the Church of Jesus Christ of Latter-day Saints (LDS Church) in 1873, although the church divested its interest in the bank in 1960.

== History ==
Zion's Savings Bank & Trust Company was established by the LDS Church in July 1873 to take over the savings department of the Deseret National Bank, the fourth attempt at creating a national bank in Utah, incorporated in 1868. It opened for business on October 1, 1873 and received $5,876 in deposits from 46 depositors. Brigham Young, LDS Church president, was the bank's first president, and the bank was intended to encourage immigration to Utah and further the financial interests of the church.

During the Panic of 1893, the bank managed to remain solvent despite difficulties.

During the early 20th century, Zions financed such firms as:

- Bingham Copper Company (later Kennecott Utah Copper)
- Los Angeles and Salt Lake Railroad (later part of the Union Pacific Railroad)
- Big Cottonwood Power Company (later Utah Power and then Rocky Mountain Power)
- Salt Lake Gas Company (later Mountain Fuel Supply Company and then Questar Gas)

The Panic of 1907 was the lone interruption in the steady growth of Zions. However, deposits grew from $2 million in 1901 to $9 million in 1918.

=== Great Depression ===
On the morning of February 15, 1932 customers began a run on the bank, waiting in lines that ran out of the building and onto the street. Tellers were instructed to honor all withdrawal requests. In 2.5 days, a total of $1.5 million was withdrawn. Near the end of the second day, Heber J. Grant, president of both the bank and the LDS Church, placed a sign in the bank's window that read, in part: "[The bank] is in a very strong, clean, liquid condition. It can pay off every depositor in full. Fear of its failure is not only without foundation, but positively foolish. There is no safer bank in the State or the Nation."

Lines of depositors that had been as long as a city block began to dwindle, and within five or six days many customers returned to deposit their money. By month's end, total deposits were more than withdrawals, and Zions had survived the Great Depression.

In 1957, Zions merged with Utah Savings and Trust Company, established in 1889, and First National Bank of Salt Lake City, established in 1890. The surviving institution was named Zions First National Bank.

=== 1960–2007 ===
Keystone Insurance and Investment Co. was formed in April 1955 to acquire Lockhart Corporation. In April 1960, Keystone, together with several individual investors, acquired a 57.5% interest in Zions First National Bank from the LDS Church. At that time, the bank had deposits of approximately $120 million. In 1965, the name of the company was changed to Zions Bancorporation. However, it operated as Zions Utah Bancorporation from 1966 to 1987.

It acquired Bank of Kearns in 1962, Bank of Spanish Fork in 1968, Utah National Bank in 1969, Bank of Commerce, Bank of St. George, and Bountiful State Bank in 1970, Bank of Vernal and Carbon Emery Bank in 1973.

In January 1966, Zions became a public company via an initial public offering. There continued to be some minority shareholders until April 1972, when the company exchanged the remaining minority shares for common shares.

The bank expanded into Nevada in 1985 with the purchase of Nevada State Bank. It entered Arizona in 1986 with the acquisition of Mesa Bank, and expanded into Colorado and New Mexico in 1996 by acquiring Aspen Bancshares, which operated Pitkin County Bank and Trust, Valley National Bank of Cortez, and Centennial Savings Bank.

In March 1997, Zions acquired 27 branches in Arizona, Idaho, Nevada, and Utah from Wells Fargo. In July 1997, Zions acquired Tri-State Bank of Idaho. In September 1997, Zions acquired Vectra Banking Corporation and Tri-State Finance Corporation of Colorado for a total of $200 million.

In 1999, the company bid for First Security Corporation but lost to Wells Fargo after the U.S. Securities and Exchange Commission forced Zions to restate its results in prior years due to the way it accounted for acquisitions. Despite the unsuccessful pursuit of First Security, Zions became the largest bank headquartered in Utah.

In 1999, the company proposed a $5.9 billion acquisition of First Security Corporation. The acquisition was delayed due to accounting revisions Zions made at the request of federal regulators. By March 2000, the deal's value fell to $3.8 billion after First Security's stock plummeted following an earnings warning. Zions' shareholders ultimately rejected the merger. In April 2000, Wells Fargo agreed to acquire First Security.

In December 2005, the company expanded into Texas with the acquisition of Amegy Bank.

=== Since 2008 ===
On October 27, 2008, Zions received a $1.4 billion loan from the U.S. government as a result of the Troubled Asset Relief Program. It repaid the final $700 million on September 26, 2012, and the government realized a profit of $253 million. In 2010, Zions sold NetDeposit to BankServ. Zions Bank paid over $8 million in civil penalties in 2011, related to investigation by the fraud division of the Office of the Comptroller of the Currency which alleged failures to follow regulations about possible money laundering activities. Harris Simmons, then CEO of Zions, said the investigation found no evidence of actual illegal activities and added the failures to follow regulations were not intentional. On June 1, 2015, Zions Bancorporation announced a corporate restructuring, which included the consolidation of seven bank charters into a single charter and $120 million in expense reduction initiatives. In October 2018, Zions merged the holding company and its banking subsidiary ZB, N.A. into Zions Bancorporation, N.A.
