= Paul Murphy (English footballer) =

English footballer

Personal information
- Full name: Paul Murphy
- Date of birth: 16 March 1954 (age 72)
- Place of birth: Ashington, England
- Position: Forward

Senior career*
Years	Team	Apps	(Gls)
1971–1972	Ashington	?	(?)
1972–1973	Rotherham United	1	(0)
1973–1974	Workington	12	(1)
- * Club domestic league appearances and goals

Paul Murphy (born 16 March 1954) is an English former professional footballer who played in the Football League as a forward.
