= Paul F. Murphy =

Massachusetts politician (1932-)

Member of the Massachusetts House of Representatives from the 12th Suffolk district
- In office 1963–1974

Personal details
- Born: October 14, 1932 (age 93) Boston, Massachusetts, US
- Education: Boston College; Harvard Law School; Harvard Kennedy School

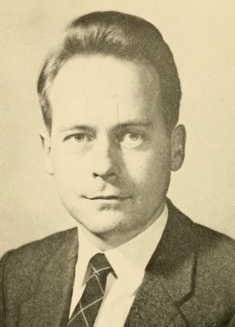
Portrait of Paul F. Murphy member of the Massachusetts House of Representatives

Paul F. Murphy (born October 14, 1932) was an American politician who was the member of the Massachusetts House of Representatives from the 12th Suffolk district.
