= Cadence Bank =

American commercial bank

- Formerly: Bank of Tupelo (1876–1966); Bank of Mississippi (1966–1997); BancorpSouth (1997–2021)
- Traded as: NYSE: CADE
- Industry: Banking
- Founded: 1876; 150 years ago
- Defunct: February 1, 2026; 8 months ago (as an independent corporation)
- Fate: Acquired by Huntington Bancshares
- Headquarters: Tupelo, Mississippi and Houston, Texas, U.S.
- Area served: United States (Alabama, Arkansas, Florida, Georgia, Louisiana, Mississippi, Missouri, Oklahoma, Tennessee, Texas, and Illinois)
- Key people: James D. Rollins III (Chairman & CEO); Paul B. Murphy, Jr. (Executive Vice Chairman); Chris A. Bagley (President); Valerie Toalson (CFO); Jeff W. Jaggers (COO); Mike J. Meyers (President - Banking Services); Charles J. Pignuolo (CLO); Cathy S. Freeman (CAO)
- Revenue: US$442.8 million (2021)
- Net income: US$340.9 million (2021)
- Total assets: US$47.7 billion (2022)
- Total equity: US$5.2 billion (2021)
- Number of employees: 6,550 (2022)
- Parent: BancorpSouth, Inc.
- Website: cadencebank.com

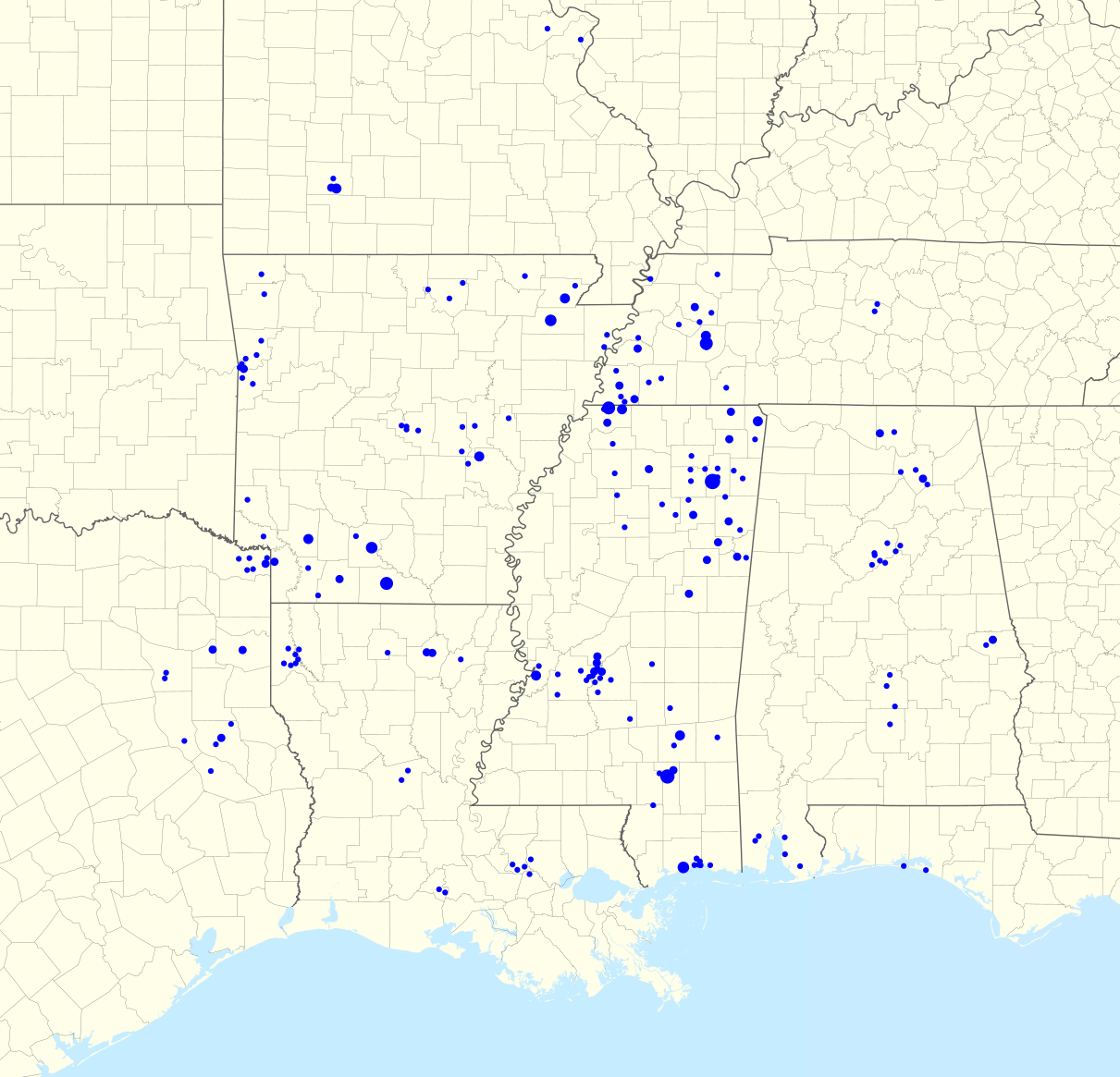
BancorpSouth branch footprint

Cadence Bank was a commercial bank with dual headquarters in Tupelo, Mississippi, and Houston, Texas, with operations in Alabama, Arkansas, Florida, Georgia, Louisiana, Mississippi, Missouri, Oklahoma, Tennessee, Texas, and Illinois.

In 1876, Raymond Trice and Company received a charter to create a bank in its hardware store in Verona, Mississippi. Having moved its banking operations to Tupelo, Mississippi in 1886, the company changed its name to Bank of Lee County, Mississippi and Bank of Tupelo.

Between 1966 and October 2021, the institution changed its name several times: Bank of Mississippi, BancorpSouth, and Cadence Bank. It has the naming rights to the Cadence Bank Arena in Tupelo.

It was acquired by Huntington Bancshares of Columbus, Ohio, on February 1, 2026. The Cadence Bank website announced that its presence would be merged into Huntington.

== History ==
Between 1987 and 1998, the bank acquired First Mississippi National Bank, Volunteer Bank of Jackson, Tennessee, and Alabama Bancorp.

In April 2000, the bank acquired First United Bancshares of El Dorado, Arkansas. First United Bancshares was acquired for $455 million in a tax-free exchange of stock where BancorpSouth gave 1.125 shares of its common stock for each share of First United Bancshares stock.

In 2002, the bank acquired Pinnacle Bancshares. In 2004, the bank acquired Business Bank of Baton Rouge, Louisiana, and Premier Bank of Brentwood, Tennessee.

In 2005, the bank acquired American State Bank of Jonesboro, Arkansas. In October 2006, the bank acquired City Bancorp of Springfield, Missouri, for $170 million with half consisting of BancorpSouth stock and the remainder in cash.

In January 2014, the bank acquired Ouachita Bancshares Corp. of Monroe, Louisiana, and Central Community Corporation of Temple, Texas. Ouachita Bancshares Corp. was purchased for 3,675,000 shares of BancorpSouth's common stock plus $22.875 million in cash. Central Community Corporation was purchased for 7,250,000 shares of BancorpSouth's common stock plus $28.5 million in cash. After nearly four years and multiple extension of completion dates, the bank received the necessary approvals in late 2017 to close the transactions. Both mergers were completed effective January 15, 2018.

In July 2017, the bank reorganized to eliminate redundant corporate infrastructure and activities. BancorpSouth, Inc. was merged with and into its wholly owned bank subsidiary, BancorpSouth Bank. The reorganization left BancorpSouth Bank as the surviving entity. This left BancorpSouth Bank being regulated by the Federal Deposit Insurance Corporation and the Mississippi Department of Banking and Consumer Finance. Before the reorganization, BancorpSouth, Inc. was regulated by the Federal Reserve as a bank holding company.

In April 2018, the bank acquired Icon Capital Corporation and its wholly owned subsidiary Icon Bank of Texas, National Association of Houston, Texas, for 4,125,000 shares of BancorpSouth's common stock plus $17.5 million in cash. The merger was completed on October 1, 2018, and folds in seven open full-service banking offices as well as two not-yet-opened full-service banking offices into BancorpSouth's footprint.

In November 2018, the bank acquired Casey Bancorp, Inc. of Grand Prairie, Texas, and its wholly owned subsidiary, Grand Bank of Texas. Also, the bank acquired Merchants Trust, Inc. of Jackson, Alabama, and its wholly owned subsidiary, Merchants Bank. Casey Bancorp, Inc. was purchased for 1,275,000 shares of BancorpSouth's common stock plus $11.000 million in cash with the agreement providing a collar with respect to the total deal value ranging from $51.750 million to $56.750 million. Merchants Trust, Inc. was purchased for 950,000 shares of BancorpSouth's common stock plus $8.000 million in cash with the agreement providing a collar with respect to the total deal value ranging from $37.500 million to $43.000 million. Both mergers were completed effective April 1, 2019.

In March 2019, the bank acquired Van Alstyne Financial Corporation of Van Alstyne, Texas, and its wholly owned subsidiary, Texas Star Bank. Also, the bank acquired Summit Financial Enterprises, Inc. of Panama City, Florida, and its wholly owned subsidiary Summit Bank, National Association. Van Alstyne Financial Corporation was purchased for 2,100,000 shares of BancorpSouth's common stock plus $20.500 million in cash with the agreement providing a collar with respect to the total deal value ranging from $80.000 million to $86.700 million. Summit Financial Enterprises, Inc. was purchased for 2,500,000 shares of BancorpSouth's common stock plus $20.000 million in cash with the agreement providing a collar with respect to the total deal value ranging from $95.000 million to $107.500 million. Both mergers were completed effective September 1, 2019.

In September 2019, the bank acquired Texas First Bancshares, Inc. of Waco, Texas, and its wholly owned subsidiary, Texas First State Bank for 1,065,000 shares of BancorpSouth's common stock plus $13.0 million in cash. The terms of the merger agreement provide for a collar with respect to the total deal value ranging from $38.8 million to $46.5 million. The merger was completed on January 1, 2020.

In April 2021, BancorpSouth Bank entered into a merger agreement with Cadence Bancorporation, with the merged entity using the Cadence Bank name. The merger was completed on October 29, 2021.

In October 2023, Cadence Bank sold its insurance subsidiary, Cadence Insurance to Arthur J. Gallagher & Co. for $904 million.

On 27 October 2025, Huntington Bancshares announced the acquisition of Cadence Bank for $7.4 billion. The merger closed on February 1, 2026.

== Insurance acquisitions ==
In April 1999, the bank acquired Stewart, Sneed, Hewes Group of Gulfport, Mississippi.

In April 2003, the bank acquired WMS, LLC of Baton Rouge, Louisiana, which operated under the name of Wright & Percy Insurance. Also, in July of the same year, the bank acquired Ramsey, Krug, Farrell and Lensing, Inc. of Little Rock, Arkansas.

In February 2008, the bank acquired JMG/IC Insurance Agency, Inc. of Nacogdoches, Texas.

In June 2012, the bank acquired The Securance Group, Inc. of Brewton, Alabama.

In December 2013, the bank acquired GEM Insurance Agencies of Houston, Texas.

In April 2014, the bank acquired Knox Insurance Group, LLC of Lafayette, Louisiana.

In December 2016, the bank acquired Waguespack & Associates Insurance, Inc. of Gonzales, Louisiana.

== Services offered ==
Cadence offered checking and savings accounts, loans, credit cards, wealth management, insurance, and financial advice. It also offered conforming, FHA, Jumbo, VA, and USDA mortgages as well as HELOCs. For businesses, it offered small business banking and treasury management services.
