= Cadence Spalding =

American educator and musician

- Also known as: Jennifer Spalding, Miss Jenny
- Born: Jennifer Lynn Spalding; San Francisco
- Genres: New age, Celtic, world, pop
- Occupations: Educator, vocalist, instrumentalist, composer, entertainer
- Instruments: Vocals
- Years active: 1985–present
- Labels: Panartist, Gemini Sun Records, CreateSpace, Sound Manipulations
- Website: www.cadencespalding.com

Cadence Spalding is an American educator, vocalist, instrumentalist and composer. She is well known as a new age musician and also as a children entertainer under the name of Miss Jenny. Her solo album Save The World peaked #4 on the Top 100 New Age/Ambient/World Radio/Internet Airwaves Chart and was the best new age album in 2009.

== Personal life ==
Cadence Spalding was born Jennifer Lynn Spalding in San Francisco to a father that read law at the University of California, Berkeley and a mother that had been a model. Although with this family background, she got many influences in music from her father, who was a choir director in his spare time, but notably from her grandmother, Jean Spalding (née Hargrove), a music teacher in northern California for over 30 years.

== Career ==
Spalding started her career singing as part of a college band called Jane His Wife from 1985 to 1987. They played for private parties and weddings. She later got a Bachelor's degree in Art from the University of California, Davis and a Graduate Degree in Education from Saint Mary's College of California. Apart from these studies, she has also got a California teaching credential in Music and Art Education. Then Spalding moved to San Francisco where she worked as an agent to preschool teacher, an aerobics instructor and a waitress for a TV producer. Afterwards she got a commercial music degree in Vocal Performance from the Musicians Institute, Hollywood. As her father, Spalding has been a choir director at educational organizations in Los Angeles and San Francisco. She was the owner of The Dance Garden, an arts school for children in San Francisco. Her occupations have also included several charitable initiatives, including writing and performing music for Share Inc.

=== Miss Jenny ===
With an educational background, Cadence Spalding has been a performer at many events for youngsters under the name of Miss Jenny, a character she has been developing since she was 20 years old. Miss Jenny main performances consist of music and art activities for parties and community festivals, hosted by a special Miss Jenny's character. Miss Jenny uses special costumes to portray different creatures and individuals. Miss Jenny project can nowadays be watched on the local TV show The N.A.P.A. Show on Napa Valley TV, a community TV station based in Napa, California.

=== Discography ===
She recorded Promises To Keep, her first solo album, as Jennifer Spalding. As Cadence Spalding she released Save The World, which peaked #4 on New Age Reporter's 2009 Top 100 Chart and is considered her first major work.

| Album | Year | Label | Notes |
|---|---|---|---|
| Promises To Keep | 2006 | Panartist | Released as Jennifer Spalding. |
| A Star Is Born | 2007 | Gemini Sun Records | In collaboration with Mars Lasar. |
| Save The World | 2009 | CreateSpace | Includes a bonus DVD. |
| Holiday High | 2009 | Sound Manipulations | In collaboration with Mars Lasar. |
