= Cadence (vocal group) =

Canadian a cappella vocal group

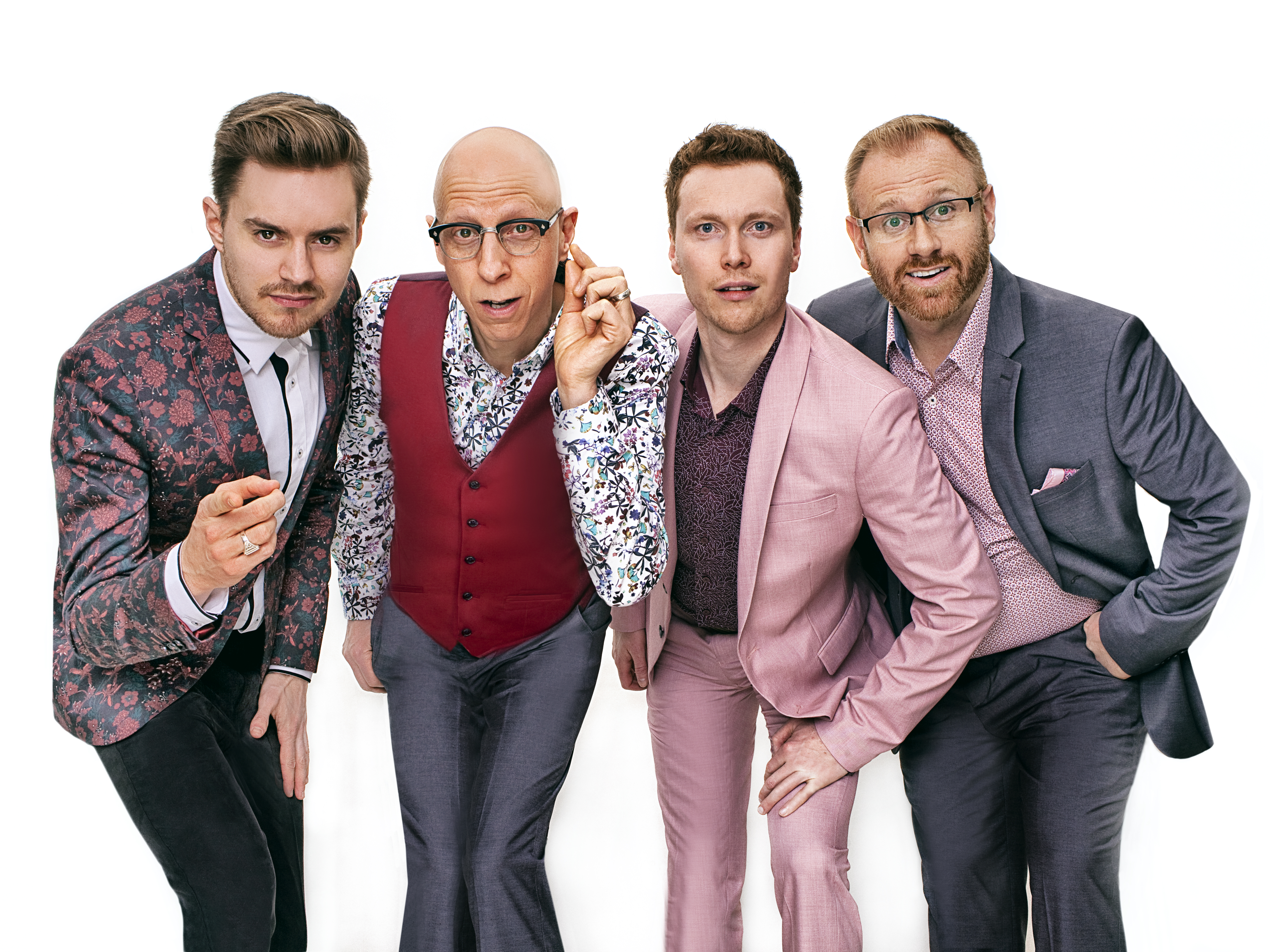

Background information
- Origin: Toronto, Canada
- Genres: A capella
- Years active: 1998–2020
- Past members: Ross Lynde, Kurt Sampson, David Lane, Lucas Marchand, Carl Berger, Aaron Jensen, Dylan Bell, Kevin Fox, Daniel Galessiere, Darryl Huggins, James De Pinho
- Website: cadence-unplugged.com

Cadence was a Canadian a cappella vocal group based in Toronto, Ontario. Nominated for the 2006 Juno Award for Best Vocal Jazz Album of the Year for their album "Twenty for One", they have produced five albums.

== History ==
Cadence formed in 1998 by York University students Carl Berger, Ross Lynde, Daniel Galessiere, and Kevin Fox. In 2000, the group released an album, Frost Free, with a capella arrangements of popular pop and jazz songs. Their album Twenty For One was released in 2005.

In 2009, Cadence sang on Kristy Cardinelli's album My Romance. By 2007, Fox and Bell had left the group, and Aaron Jensen and Kurt Sampson had joined; this lineup recorded the group's next album, Speak Easy.

Cadence toured and performed around Canada, as well as in the United States, Europe and Asia. Cadence was also active in music education, attending school functions and hosting a summer camp for a cappella musicians.

On October 21, 2020, Cadence announced via their Facebook page that the group would no longer be continuing.

== Discography ==
Year	Album	Notes
2000	Frost-Free	
2005	Twenty For One	Winner, 2006 Juno Award for Best Vocal Jazz Album of the Year
2010	Speak Easy	
2011	Cool Yule	Featuring Lori Cullen on "Baby, It's Cold Outside"
2018	Home	All Canadian content, featuring David Clayton Thomas on "Lucretia MacEvil"
