= Ameris Bancorp =

American publicly traded banking company

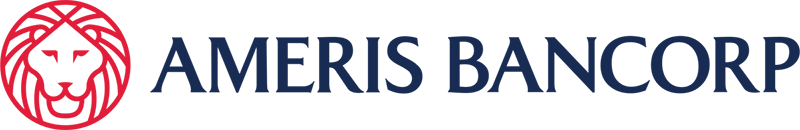

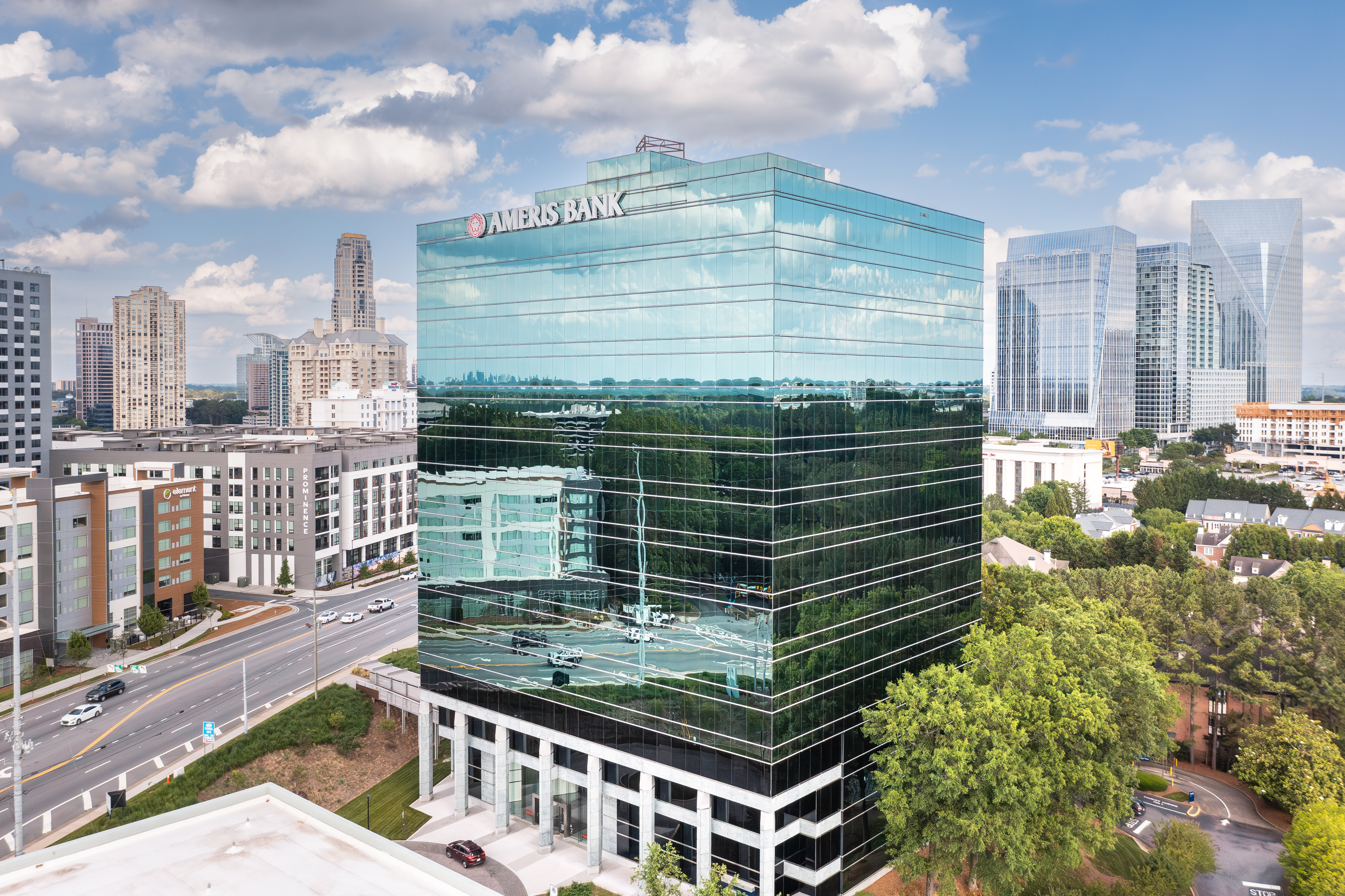
- Ameris Bancorp headquarters in Atlanta, Georgia
- Type: Public
- Traded as: NYSE: ABCB; S&P 600 component
- Industry: Banking; Financial services
- Predecessors: American Banking Company; ABC Holding Company; ABC Bancorp
- Founded: October 1, 1971; 55 years ago (as American Banking Company); December 18, 1980; 45 years ago (as ABC Holding Company); Moultrie, Georgia
- Founder: Eugene M. Vereen, Jr.
- Headquarters: Atlanta, Georgia, U.S.
- Area served: Georgia; Alabama; Florida; South Carolina; North Carolina; Tennessee; Virginia; Maryland
- Key people: H. Palmer Proctor, Jr. (CEO); James B. Miller, Jr., chairman; Nicole S. Stokes (CFO); Lawton E. Bassett III (president)
- Products: Retail banking Small business financing Commercial banking Mortgage
- Revenue: ▲$1.08 billion (2024)
- Net income: ▲$358.7 million (2024)
- Total assets: ▲$26.3 billion (2024)
- Total equity: ▲$3.75 billion (2024)
- Number of employees: 2,710 (March 2025)
- Website: amerisbank.com

Ameris Bancorp is an American bank holding company headquartered in Atlanta, Georgia. Through its bank subsidiary, Ameris Bank, the company operates full-service branches in Georgia, Alabama, Florida, North Carolina and South Carolina, and mortgage-only locations in Georgia, Alabama, Florida, North Carolina, South Carolina, Virginia, Maryland, and Tennessee. The company offers online and mobile banking options for both consumers and businesses.

== History ==
The company was founded on October 1, 1971 in Moultrie, Georgia as American Banking Company by Eugene M. Vereen, Jr. The bank started with one location and $1 million in capital. Vereen said he "envisioned a bank for the future" that "set out to create a collective mindset that doesn't rely on tired banking norms or cookie-cutter solutions."

In 1979, the company acquired Toney Brothers Bank in Doerun, Ga. In 1980, ABC Holding Company was formed as a parent company to American Banking Company before changing its name to ABC Bancorp in 1986. Sixteen years after its founding, ABC Bancorp became a public company in 1987 via an initial public offering and in 1994 began trading on the Nasdaq. The company changed to its current name of Ameris Bancorp in 2005.

=== Expansion in the Southeast and Mid-Atlantic United States ===
What started as a regional bank in South Georgia began its expansion into neighboring states in 1996 when it branched into Alabama. Four years later, the bank expanded into Florida. In 2006, the bank expanded into South Carolina and into North Carolina in 2020. The bank now maintains 166 full-service branches in those five states combined, with additional mortgage-only locations in Alabama, Georgia, Florida, South Carolina, North Carolina, Virginia, Maryland and Tennessee.

=== Mergers and Acquisitions ===
Since 1979, Ameris Bank has successfully completed 35 mergers and acquisitions. That includes the $24.5 million acquisition of Prosperity Banking Company in 2013, the $37.3 million acquisition of Coastal Bankshares in 2014, the $50 million acquisition of Merchants & Southern Banks of Florida in 2015, the $96.4 million acquisition of Jacksonville Bank in 2016, the $169.3 million acquisition of Atlantic Coast Financial in 2018, the $397.1 million acquisition of Hamilton State Bank in 2018 and the $869.3 million acquisition of Fidelity Southern Corporation in 2019. During the Fidelity acquisition, Ameris appointed Fidelity CEO H. Palmer Proctor, Jr. as CEO and updated its brand to incorporate Fidelity's recognizable Lion logo.

Between 2009 and 2012, in transactions organized by the Federal Deposit Insurance Corporation, the company acquired American United Bank, United Security Bank, Satilla Community Bank, First Bank of Jacksonville, Darby Bank & Trust, Tifton Banking Company, One Georgia Bank, High Trust Bank, Central Bank of Georgia, and Montgomery Bank & Trust, all of which suffered from bank failure.

In 2021, Ameris acquired Balboa Capital, an online provider of business lending solutions to small and mid-sized businesses nationwide.

=== Ameris Bank (subsidiary) ===
Ameris Bank moved its executive team to Jacksonville, Florida in 2016, where they remained for three years before moving to their current headquarters in Atlanta in 2019. The company expanded commercial banking across the southeast in 2020. Ameris Bancorp's common stock began trading on the NYSE on Tuesday, July 23, 2024, and continues to be traded under the ticker symbol "ABCB."

=== Awards and recognition ===
Ameris Bank has received several notable recognitions for customer service, business banking, and company culture. Of note, in 2025, Ameris Bancorp was recognized on Forbes’ list of America’s Best Companies 2025. This inaugural Forbes list is developed from a comprehensive analysis of more than 60 metrics including customer sentiment, public trust, cybersecurity, employee satisfaction, workforce stability and financial strength. Ameris was named a Top 100 Inspiring Workplaces for North America, which recognizes organizations that have created a positive and inspiring culture resulting in increased engagement, productivity and overall success. Ameris Bank was also recognized with five Greenwich Excellence Awards for Small Business Banking. Among more than 500 banks evaluated, Ameris Bank is one of 39 cited for Distinctive Quality in Small Business Banking nationally.

Ameris has also been recognized as one of Atlanta’s Top Workplaces for “offering a nurturing environment where teammates are empowered to use their diverse perspectives to help customers.” In addition, the bank was also named one of Jacksonville Top Workplaces for 2024 by the Florida Times-Union.

New Ameris Bank logo (post rebrand in 2019).

== Operations ==
=== Personal Banking and Mortgage Services ===
Ameris Bank has a range of traditional banking services such as checking and savings accounts, money market accounts, retirement accounts, CDs, auto and recreational loans, personal lines of credit, and mortgage loans. The company offers educational services on saving, planning and fraud protection.

=== Small Business and Commercial Banking Services ===
Ameris Bank offers a variety of small business and commercial services including business checking, business and commercial cards, SBA lending, equipment and commercial real estate financing, working capital loans, treasury services and more. Ameris has expert bankers in many industry specialties, including: agribusiness, attorneys, dental practice, educational sector, healthcare, manufacturing, municipal, nonprofit, professional services, water and waste disposal, and veterinary banking.

== Charitable Efforts ==
=== Community Involvement and Sponsorships ===
Ameris regularly supports civic and social organizations with giving and volunteerism for food drives, boys and girls programs, financial literacy, career programs, Red Cross and disaster relief efforts, among others. The company has sponsored the Jacksonville (FL) Marathon, Peachtree Road Race (GA), Autism Speaks Walk, Estamos Aqui Fiesta, Georgia Coalition Against Domestic Violence, and American Foundation for Suicide Prevention.

=== The Ameris Foundation ===
The Ameris Foundation was founded in 2020 to benefit individuals across the markets it serves. Through four core pillars, the foundation provides educational opportunities, promotes physical wellness, supports mental wellness and strives to improve financial outcomes for underserved communities.

In 2022, Ameris extended its commitment to its employees by establishing the Courageous Fund. This initiative provides crucial grants to Ameris Bank teammates facing financial hardships, such as dealing with immediate effects from a hurricane or needing a short-term financial boost for other challenging circumstances.

In 2024, the Ameris Foundation supported teammates by distributing more than 80 grants totaling more than $70,000. Additionally, the Foundation dispersed a total of more than $100,000 to nonprofits including the United Way, the American Foundation for Suicide Prevention, the Boys and Girls Club, City of Refuge, InspiredU, and many other worthwhile organizations.

== Leadership ==
Name	Position
James B. Miller, Jr.	Ameris Bancorp Chairman
Leo J. Hill	Lead Independent Director Transamerica Mutual Funds
H. Palmer Proctor Jr.	Ameris Bank Chief Executive Officer Ameris Bancorp Chief Executive Officer
William I. Bowen Jr.	Funeral Services Bowen-Donaldson Home for Funerals
Rodney Bullard	Vice President of Community Affairs at Chick-fil-A, Inc. Executive Director of the Chick-fil-A Foundation
Millard Choate	Founder and President of Choate Construction Company
Daniel B. Jeter	Consumer Finance Standard Discount Corporation
Robert P. Lynch	Automobile Sales Lynch Management Company
Claire McLean	COO and EVP of Preferred Capital Securities, LLC President of Preferred Shareholder Services
William H. Stern	President & CEO - Real Estate Stern & Stern and Associates

== Headquarters & Locations ==
Ameris Bank is headquartered in Atlanta, Georgia and has numerous branches across the Southeast and Mid-Atlantic United States, including Alabama, Florida, Georgia, Maryland, North Carolina, South Carolina, Tennessee and Virginia.
