= Cadence Bank (1887–2021) =

American financial institution

- Formerly: First National Bank of Aberdeen (1887–1972); First National Bank of Monroe County (1972–1974); First United National Bank (1974); National Bank of Mississippi (1974); National Bank of Commerce of Mississippi (1974–1998); National Bank of Commerce (1998–2005)
- Type: Public company
- Industry: Banking
- Founded: April 30, 1887; 139 years ago
- Defunct: October 29, 2021; 4 years ago
- Fate: Acquired by BancorpSouth
- Successor: Cadence Bank (now Huntington Bancshares)
- Headquarters: Aberdeen, Mississippi (1887–1974); Starkville, Mississippi (1974–2011); Birmingham, Alabama (2011–2019); Atlanta, Georgia (2019–2021)
- Number of locations: 105 (2021)
- Key people: Paul B. Murphy, Jr. Chairman; Sam Tortorici, CEO; Valerie Toalson, CFO; Hank Holmes, President
- Revenue: ▲US$542.54 million (2020)
- Net income: ▼US$-205.53 million (2020)
- Total assets: ▲US$18.71 billion (2020)
- Total equity: ▼US$2.12 billion (2020)
- Number of employees: 1,818 (2020)
- Parent: Cadence Bancorporation

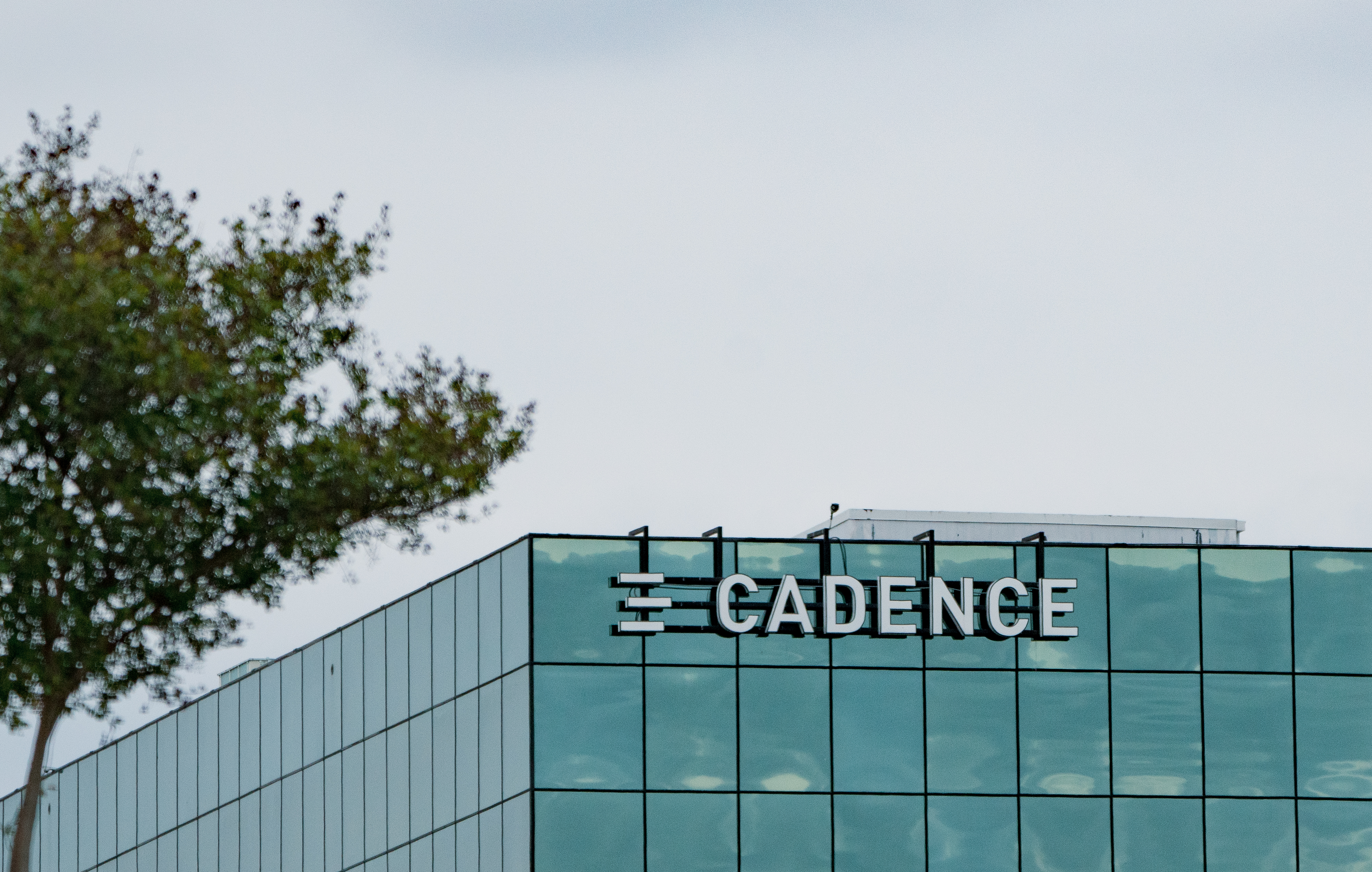
Cadence Bank Memorial Branch in Houston, Texas

Cadence Bank was a US-based bank with 105 branches in Alabama, Florida, Georgia, Mississippi, Tennessee and Texas. The bank was based in Atlanta, with executive and operations headquarters in Birmingham, Alabama. It was the primary subsidiary of Houston, Texas based Cadence Bancorporation, a bank holding company.

The bank owned the naming rights to the Cadence Bank Amphitheatre in Atlanta.

== History ==
Cadence Bank was founded as the First National Bank of Aberdeen, on April 30, 1887. In 1972, it changed its name to the First National Bank of Monroe County. In March 1974, it merged with Peoples Bank in Starkville, Mississippi, becoming the National Bank of Mississippi in May of that year. In October 1974, it merged with the National Bank of Commerce of Columbus to become the National Bank of Commerce of Mississippi. In 2005, it changed its name to Cadence Bank, N.A.

The bank's parent company formed in 2009 as Community Bancorp LLC. In 2010, it secured $1 billion of capital commitments. It acquired Cadence Bank in March 2011.

In April 2011, it acquired Superior Bancorp of Birmingham, Alabama in a transaction facilitated by the Federal Deposit Insurance Corporation due to Superior Bank's failure.

In November 2011, the bank moved its headquarters from Starkville, Mississippi to Birmingham, Alabama.

In July 2012, it acquired Encore Bank.

In January 2019, the company acquired State Bank. It also moved its headquarters to Atlanta.

In April 2021, Cadence Bancorporation entered into a merger agreement with BancorpSouth Bank; the merged entity uses the Cadence Bank name.
