= USDA home loan =

Mortgage loan offered to rural property owners

A USDA Home Loan from the USDA loan program, also known as the USDA Rural Development Guaranteed Housing Loan Program, is a mortgage loan offered to rural property owners by the United States Department of Agriculture, Rural Development.

== Types of USDA Loans ==
=== Guaranteed Loan ===
For home loans that may have an income of up to 115% of the median income for the area. Families must be without adequate housing, but be able to afford the mortgage payments, including taxes and insurance. In addition, applicants must have reasonable credit histories. Additionally, the property must be located within the USDA RD Home Loan "footprint." USDA Loans offer 100% financing to qualified buyers, and allow for all closing costs to be either paid for by the seller or financed into the loan.

USDA Home Loans have Maximum Household Income Limits which vary by the county in which you purchase a home; the income limits change annually. The Maximum Household Income Limits are based upon everyone in the home who is a wage earner, even if their income is not going to be used to qualify for the USDA Loan. For instance, Social Security Income from an elderly relative living in the home would be considered when determining the maximum household income - even if that relative was not going to apply to be on the mortgage loan. There are deductions, however, that USDA Underwriters allow, and oftentimes those calculations will pull a family under the Maximum Household Income Limit.

Approved lenders under the Single Family Housing Guaranteed Loan program include:

Any State housing agency; lenders approved by HUD for submission of applications for Federal Housing Mortgage Insurance or as an issuer of Ginnie Mae mortgage backed securities; the U.S. Veterans Administration as a qualified mortgagee; Fannie Mae for participation in family mortgage loans; Freddie Mac for participation in family mortgage loans; any FCS (Farm Credit System) institution with direct lending authority; any lender participating in other USDA Rural Development and/or Farm Service Agency guaranteed loan programs.

Mortgage Insurance: USDA Loans require 1.0% of the loan amount in up front funding fee, and a monthly mortgage insurance premium based on up to 0.5% of the balance annually. The annual premium is divided by 12 to arrive at the premium charge per month. Effective 10/1/19, the annual fee is 0.35%.

== Ideas and works ==
=== Direct Loan ===
Purpose: Section 502 loans are primarily used to help low-income individuals or households purchase homes in rural areas. Funds can be used to build, repair, renovate or relocate a home, or to purchase and prepare sites, including providing water and sewage facilities.

Eligibility: Applicants for direct loans from USDA must have very low or low incomes. Very low income is defined as below 50 percent of the area median income (AMI); low income is between 50 and 80 percent of AMI; moderate income is 80 to 115 percent of AMI. Families must be without adequate housing, but be able to afford the mortgage payments, including taxes and insurance, which are typically 24 percent of an applicant's income. However, payment subsidy is available to applicants to enhance repayment ability. Applicants must be unable to obtain credit elsewhere, yet have reasonable credit histories.

=== Rural Repair and Rehabilitation Loan ===
Purpose: The Very Low-Income Housing Repair program provides loans and grants to very low-income homeowners to repair, improve, or modernize their dwellings or to remove health and safety hazards.

Eligibility: To obtain a loan, homeowner-occupants must be unable to obtain affordable credit elsewhere and must have very low incomes, defined as below 50 percent of the area median income. They must need to make repairs and improvements to make the dwelling more safe and sanitary or to remove health and safety hazards. Grants are only available to homeowners who are 62 years old or older and cannot repay a Section 504 loan.

== USDA home loan vs traditional mortgage ==
A USDA home loan is different from a traditional mortgage offered in the United States in several ways.

1. USDA loans require no down payment, meaning that it is possible to finance up to 100% of the property value.
2. One must meet the income restrictions for the county in which the buyer is interested. Each county has a maximum Income Requirement. The USDA Home Loan Program does allow for considerations for expenses like Child Care.
3. To be eligible, one must be purchasing a property in a rural area, as defined by the USDA.
4. The home or property that the potential buyer is looking to purchase must be owner-occupied; investment properties are not eligible for USDA loans.
