= Amegy Bank of Texas =

American banking company

Amegy Bank NA
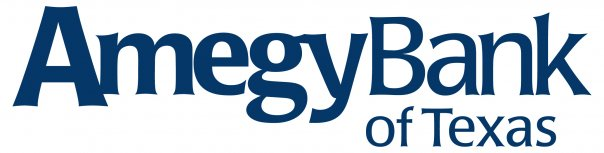

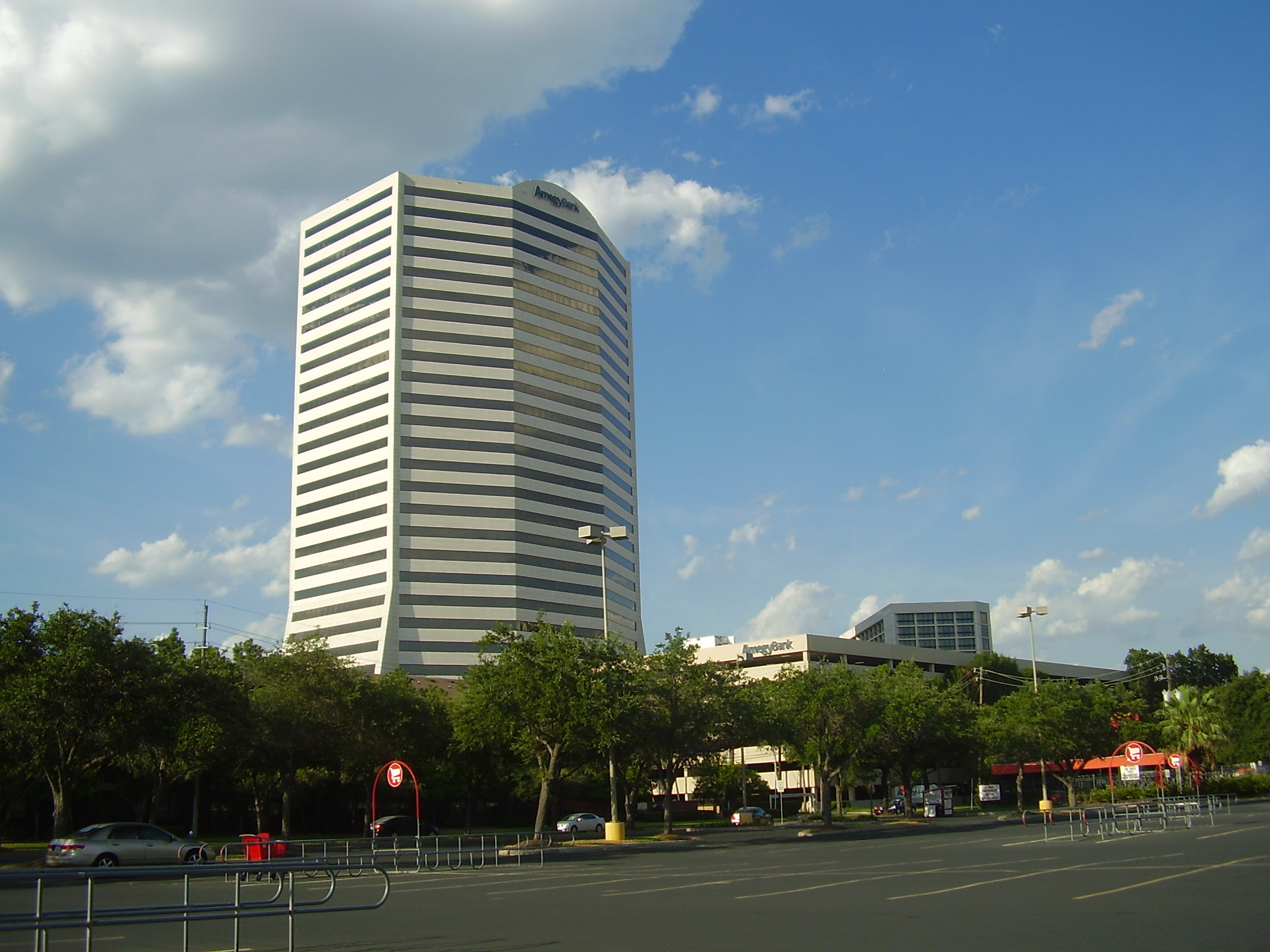
- Five Post Oak Park, the bank's headquarters
- Company type: division
- Industry: Banking
- Founded: 1989
- Headquarters: Houston, Texas
- Key people: Steve D. Stephens (President/CEO)
- Products: Financial services
- Owner: Zions Bancorporation
- Number of employees: 2,000+
- Website: www.amegybank.com

Amegy Bank of Texas (previously known as Southwest Bank of Texas) is an American bank operating in Texas that is a division(until 2018 a subsidiary) of Zions Bancorporation. Operating primarily in Houston, Dallas-Fort Worth, and central Texas, the bank is headquartered in the Five Post Oak Park building in Houston’s Post Oak Park business park. As of 2010, it was the largest bank in Houston, with $11 billion in assets, 80 locations, and 2,000 employees in Texas.

== History ==
The Northwest Crossing National Bank was founded in 1989. Walter Johnson joined the company in February 1990. While he was the head of the company, its name changed to the Southwest Bank of Texas. Its second capital offering occurred in December 1992. Its first public offering occurred in January 1997.

On the afternoon of Tuesday January 25, 2005, the Southwest Bank of Texas announced that it would change its name to Amegy Bank of Texas. The name change took effect on March 7 of that year. Southwest Bancorporation of Texas Inc., the parent company, was scheduled to change its name in May of that year, pending approval from the company shareholders. The NASDAQ symbol for the company was changed from SWBT to ANBK.

In July 2005, Zions Bancorporation announced that it would buy Amegy Bancorp for $1.7 billion in cash and stock.

In 2007, Amegy Bank signed a definitive merger/purchase agreement with InterContinental National Bank of San Antonio.

== Headquarters ==
The bank has its headquarters in the Five Post Oak Park building in the Post Oak Park business park in Houston, Texas. Five Post Oak Park, originally developed by The Winter Company, was completed in 1982. It is located in the Post Oak Park business park.

Amegy Bank first moved to the Uptown area in 1990. Prior to 1996 Amegy Bank had its headquarters in the three-story, 57,000-square-foot (5,300 m^{2}) ICA Center, which is across the street from Five Post Oak Park. Amegy Bank leased almost all of the space in the building, which was owned by the Insurance Corporation of North America. The bank had a three-lane drive in facility at the ICA Center.

For a two-year period ending in 1996, Amegy searched for a location for its new headquarters. In 1996 Amegy decided to switch places with Heritage Bank, which leased in Five Post Oak Park. By July 1996 the two banks signed lease agreements with their new landlords. After Amegy moved to Five Post Oak Park, it initially received 80,000 square feet (7,400 m^{2}) of space while it had an option for more space. In addition the move allowed Amegy increased signage space and it allowed both banks to retain their offices in the vicinity of Uptown. The bank initially leased five floors and placed signs on both sides of the building and on the ground level. The bank also gained a five lane drive through facility.
