= List of banks in Malaysia =

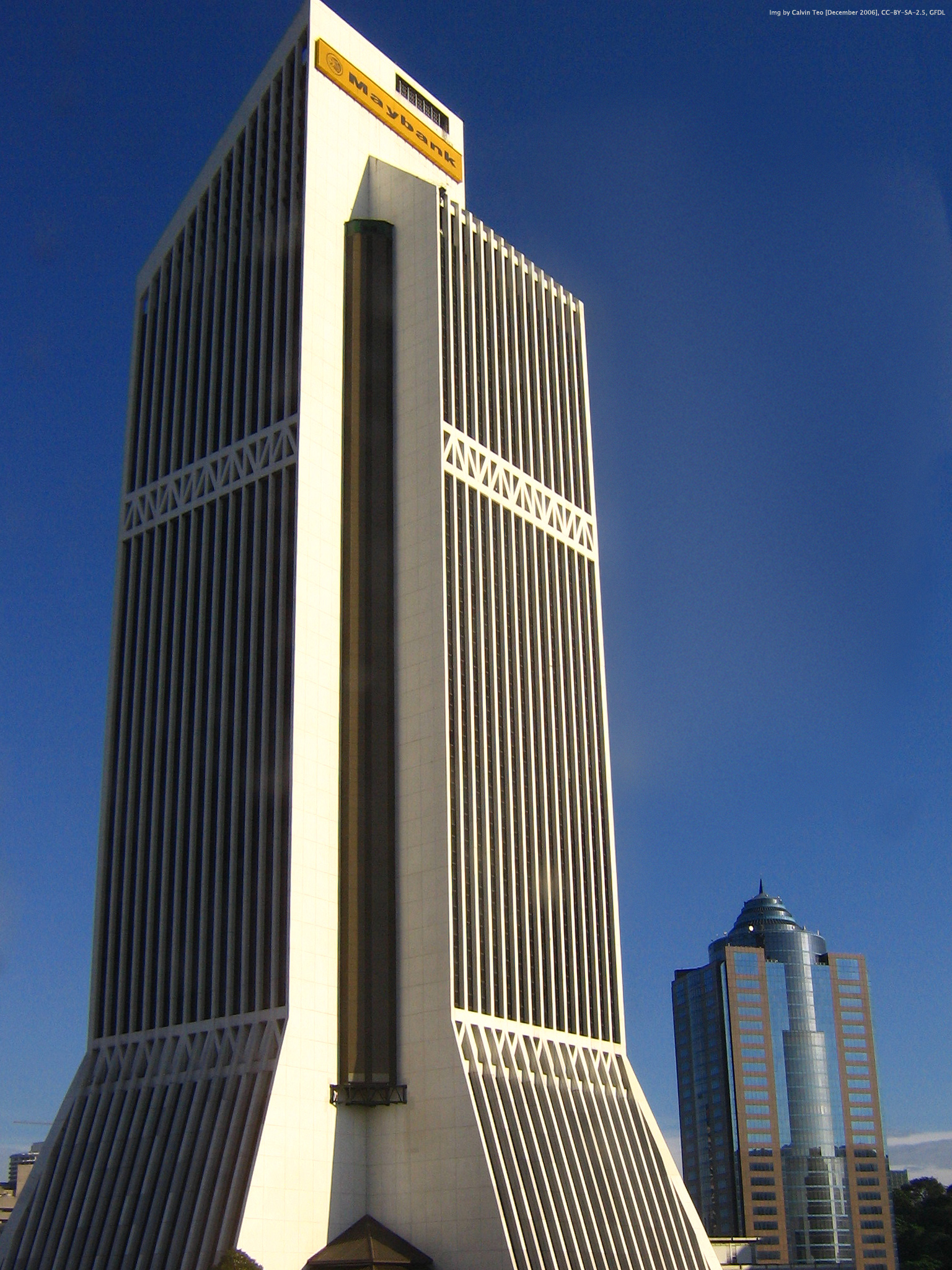
Headquarters of Maybank, Malaysia's largest bank

Kuala Lumpur has a large financial sector, and in the year 2015 is ranked the 22nd in the world in the Global Financial Centres Index. There are currently 27 commercial banks (8 domestic and 19 foreign), 16 Islamic banks (10 domestic and 6 foreign), 15 investment banks (all domestic) and 2 other financial institutions (both domestic) operating in Malaysia.

Commercial banks are the largest and most significant providers of funds in the banking system. The largest banks in Malaysia's finance sector include Maybank, CIMB, Public Bank, RHB Bank, and Hong Leong Bank.

Malaysia is currently also the world's largest centre of Islamic Finance. Malaysia has 16 fully-fledged Islamic banks including five foreign ones, with total Islamic bank assets of US$168.4 billion, which accounts for 25% of the Malaysia's total banking assets. This in turn accounts for over 10% of the world's total Islamic banking assets. In comparison, Malaysia's main rival UAE, has US$95 billion of assets.

Malaysia is the global leader in terms of the sukuk (Islamic bond) market, issuing RM62 billion (US$17.74 billion) worth of sukuk in 2014 - over 66.7% of the global total of US$26.6 billion Malaysia also accounts for around two-thirds of the global outstanding sukuk market, controlling $178 billion of $290 billion, the global total.

The Malaysian government is planning to transform the country's capital Kuala Lumpur into a major financial centre in a bid to raise its profile and spark greater international trade and investment through the construction of the Tun Razak Exchange (TRX). The government believes the project will allow Malaysia to compete with regional financial superpowers such as Singapore and Hong Kong, by leveraging on the country's established strength in the rapidly growing Islamic financial marketplace.

Based in Kuala Lumpur, Bursa Malaysia serves as the country's sole national stock exchange. Trading of shares started in 1960 and it is today one of the largest bourses in Southeast Asia.

== Central Bank ==
- Bank Negara Malaysia (The Central Bank of Malaysia)

== Recent developments ==
As of 2026, Malaysia's banking sector comprises approximately 47 licensed banking institutions, including domestic banks, foreign banks, and newly established digital banks. The system operates under a dual banking structure, with both conventional and Islamic banking playing significant roles.

The introduction of digital banks such as GX Bank, Boost Bank, AEON Bank, and Ryt Bank has accelerated competition and innovation in the sector. These institutions have rapidly gained millions of users and contributed to a growing share of digital financial activity.

The sector remains highly concentrated, with major domestic banking groups—including Maybank, CIMB, Public Bank, RHB Bank, and Hong Leong Bank—accounting for a large share of total assets.

=== Top largest banks in Malaysia ===
List of Malaysian Banks ranked by total assets as of 31 December 2023 (In Billions of Malaysia Ringgit)
Ranking	Bank	Totals in billions of Malaysian ringgit	
Ranking	Bank	Assets	Equity
1	Maybank	947.8	86.0
2	CIMB	733.6	73.72
3	Public Bank	493.3	50.2
4	RHB	310.8	28.7
5	Hong Leong Bank	265.2	32.1
6	AmBank	185.2	17.6
7	UOB Malaysia	140.4	12.6
8	Bank Rakyat	117.3	22.6
9	OCBC Malaysia	99.5	9.3
10	HSBC Malaysia	94.6	11.2
11	Bank Islam	90.9	6.8
12	Affin Bank	90.1	10.6
13	Alliance Bank	65.1	6.6
14	Standard Chartered Malaysia	57.9	5.5
15	MBSB Bank	66.7	7.4
16	Citibank Malaysia	42.9	4.3
17	BSN	49.8	4.0
18	Bank Muamalat	31.5	2.9
19	Agrobank	18.8	3.2
20	Al Rajhi Bank Malaysia	12.2	0.9
21	Co-op Bank Pertama	6.1	1.0

=== Malaysian national nationwide banks ===
==== Commercial banks ====
- Affin Bank
- Alliance Bank
- AmBank
- CIMB
- Hong Leong Bank
- Maybank
- Public Bank
- RHB Bank

=== List of foreign banks (commercial) ===
List of Licensed Banking Institutions in Malaysia (commercial) in alphabetical order

- American Express Bank (Malaysia) Berhad
- BNP Paribas Malaysia Berhad
- Bangkok Bank Berhad
- Bank of America Malaysia Berhad
- Bank of China (Malaysia) Berhad
- Bank of Tokyo-Mitsubishi UFJ (Malaysia) Berhad
- China Construction Bank (Malaysia) Berhad
- Citibank Berhad (Sold to UOB Group Malaysia)
- Deutsche Bank (Malaysia) Berhad
- HSBC Bank Malaysia Berhad
- India International Bank (Malaysia) Berhad
- Industrial and Commercial Bank of China (Malaysia) Berhad
- J.P. Morgan Chase Bank Berhad
- Mizuho Bank (Malaysia)
- OCBC Bank (Malaysia) Berhad
- Standard Chartered Bank Malaysia Berhad
- Sumitomo Mitsui Banking Corporation Malaysia Berhad
- The Bank of Nova Scotia Berhad
- United Overseas Bank (Malaysia) Bhd.

=== List of Digital banks in Malaysia ===
Conventional Digital Bank

- YTL Digital Bank Berhad (Ryt Bank) - A consortium led by YTL Digital Capital Sdn. Bhd. and Sea Limited;
- GX Bank Berhad - A consortium led by GXS Bank Pte. Ltd. and Kuok Brothers Sdn. Bhd;
- Boost Bank Berhad - A consortium led by Boost Holdings Sdn. Bhd. and RHB Bank Berhad

Islamic Digital Bank

- AEON Bank (M) Berhad - A consortium led by AEON Credit Service (M) Berhad and AEON Financial Service Co., Ltd;
- KAF Digital Bank Berhad - A Shariah-compliant bank led by KAF Investment Bank, with consortium partners including Carsome and MoneyMatch

=== List of banks with marketing and representative offices in Malaysia ===
- AN1142 National Bank Limited
- The Bank of Tokyo-Mitsubishi UFJ Limited
- The Bank of New York Mellon Limited
- Credit Suisse Limited
- Middle East Investment Bank LTD
- DBS Bank Limited
- National Australia Bank Limited
- The Royal Bank of Scotland Limited
- Wells Fargo Bank Limited
- Zamora Trading Limited

=== List of offshore banks and branches in Labuan (licensed and regulated by Labuan Financial Services Authority) ===
- Aminternational (Labuan) Ltd (Labuan Branch)
- AmMerchant Bank Berhad
- Asian Trade Investment Offshore Bank (Labuan)
- Bank Islam Malaysia Berhad, (Labuan Offshore Branch)
- Bank Muamalat Malaysia Berhad, (Labuan Offshore Branch)
- Bank of America National Association Berhad, (Labuan Branch)
- The Bank of East Asia Ltd (BEA) (Labuan Branch)
- The Bank of Nova Scotia (Labuan Branch)
- The Bank of Tokyo-Mitsubishi UFJ Limited (Labuan Branch)
- Barclays Bank PLC (Labuan Branch)
- BNP Paribas (Labuan Branch)
- Calyon (Labuan Branch)
- Capital Investment Bank Limited (Labuan)
- Cathay United Bank (Labuan)
- Consolidated Credit(S)Berhad
- CIMB Bank (L) Limited
- Citibank Malaysia (L) Limited (Labuan)
- City Credit Investment Bank Limited (Labuan)
- Commercial IBT (Labuan Branch)
- Credit Suisse (Labuan Branch)
- DBS Bank Limited (Labuan Branch)
- Deutsche Bank AG (Labuan Branch)
- Dresdner Bank AG (Labuan Branch)
- ECM Libra Investment Bank Limited (Labuan)
- European Credit Investment Bank Ltd (ECIB)
- First East Export Bank (P.L.C) (FEEBANK)
- The Hong Kong and Shanghai Banking Corporation Limited Offshore Banking Unit (Labuan)
- Industrial and Commercial Bank of China (Labuan Branch)
- ING Bank NV (Labuan Branch)
- The Mega International Commercial Bank (Labuan Branch)
- J.P. Morgan Malaysia Ltd (Labuan)
- J.P. Morgan Chase Bank National Association (Labuan Branch)
- KBC Bank NV (Labuan Branch)
- Kuwait Finance House Labuan Berhad (Labuan Branch)
- Lloyds TSB Bank PLC (Labuan Branch)
- Middle East Investment Bank LTD
- Mizuho Bank Ltd (Labuan Branch)
- Macquarie Bank Limited (Labuan Branch)
- Morgan Stanley Labuan Investment Bank Limited (Labuan Branch)
- Natexis Banques Populaires (Labuan Branch)
- OSK Investment Bank (Labuan) Limited (Labuan)
- OCBC Bank Limited (Labuan Branch)
- Public Bank (L) Limited (Labuan)
- Rabobank Nederland (Labuan Branch)
- RHB Bank (L) Ltd (Labuan)
- RM Investment Bank
- The Royal Bank of Scotland PLC (Labuan Branch)
- RUSD Investment Bank Inc (Labuan)
- Schroders Malaysia (L) Berhad (Labuan)
- Société Générale (Labuan Branch)
- Sumitomo Mitsui Banking Corporation (Labuan Branch)
- UBS AG (Labuan Branch)
- United Overseas Bank Limited (Labuan Branch)

== Investment banking arm (wholesale banking) ==
=== Investment banks (full list) ===
- Affin Hwang Capital (Following merger between Affin Investment Bank and Hwang-DBS Investment Bank)
- Alliance Investment Bank Berhad
- AmInvestment Bank Berhad
- CIMB Investment Bank Berhad (Partnered with BDO Uni-bank as Authorized Agent Bank For International Tax Collection)
- Hong Leong Investment Bank Berhad
- Public Investment Bank Berhad
- RHB Investment Bank Berhad
- KAF Investment Bank Berhad
- Kenanga Investment Bank Berhad
- Maybank Investment Bank
- MIDF Investment Bank Berhad
- MIMB Investment Bank Berhad (merged with Hong Leong Investment Bank)
- OSK Investment Bank Berhad (merged with RHB Investment Bank Berhad)
- ECM Libra Investment Bank Berhad (bought over by Kenanga Investment Bank)

=== Merchant bank ===
There is none as all previous ones have been converted or merged into investment banks.

== Other types of banks ==
=== 18 Islamic banks (local and foreign) (full list) ===
- Affin Islamic Bank Berhad
- Al Rajhi Bank
- Alkhair International Islamic Bank Malaysia
- Alliance Islamic Bank Berhad
- AmBank Islamic Berhad
- MBSB Bank Berhad
- Asia Offshore Finance Agency
- Bank Islam Malaysia
- Bank Muamalat Malaysia
- CIMB Islamic Bank Berhad
- Hong Leong Islamic Banking Berhad
- HSBC Amanah Malaysia Berhad
- Kuwait Finance House (Malaysia) Berhad
- Maybank Islamic Berhad
- OCBC Al-Amin Bank Berhad
- Public Islamic Bank Berhad
- RHB Islamic Bank Berhad
- Standard Chartered Saadiq Berhad

=== Development financial institutions (government-owned banks) (full list) ===
- Agro Bank Malaysia
- Bank Rakyat
- Bank Simpanan Nasional
- Export-Import Bank of Malaysia Berhad (Exim Bank)
- Bank Perusahaan Kecil & Sederhana Berhad ((Small Medium Enterprise) SME Bank Berhad)
- Sabah Development Bank Berhad (SDB)
- Sabah Credit Corporation (SCC)
- Tabung Haji
- Credit Guarantee Corporation Malaysia Berhad (CGC)
- Malaysia Debt Ventures Berhad
- Malaysian Industrial Development Finance Berhad (MIDF) merged with MBSB in Oct 2023
- Bank Pembangunan Malaysia Berhad (BPMB) (The development bank of Malaysia)

=== Discount house ===
There is none as all previous ones have been transformed into investment banks.

=== Moneybrokers (full list) ===
- Affin Moneybrokers Sdn Bhd
- ICAP (Malaysia) Sdn Bhd (formerly known as Amanah Butler Malaysia Sdn Bhd)
- Harlow's & MGI Sdn Bhd

=== Other financial institutions (full list) ===
- ERF Sdn Bhd
- Pengurusan Danaharta Nasional Berhad
- Danajamin Nasional Berhad merged with BPMB in 2023

== List of credit cards, charge cards, debit cards and prepaid cards issuers ==
=== Credit cards issuers ===
- Banks
  - Affin Bank - Mastercard and Visa
  - Alliance Bank - Mastercard and Visa
  - Al Rajhi Bank Malaysia (i) - Visa
  - AmBank - Mastercard, Visa and UnionPay
  - Bank Islam Malaysia (i) - Mastercard and Visa
  - Bank Muamalat Malaysia (i) - Visa
  - Bank Simpanan Nasional (i) - Mastercard and Visa
  - Bank Rakyat (i) - Mastercard
  - CIMB Bank - Mastercard and Visa
  - Citibank Malaysia (Sold to UOB Group Malaysia) - Mastercard and Visa
  - Hong Leong Bank - Mastercard and Visa
  - HSBC Bank Malaysia - Mastercard and Visa
  - Industrial and Commercial Bank of China (ICBC) - UnionPay and Visa
  - Maybank - American Express, Mastercard and Visa
  - OCBC Bank - Mastercard and Visa
  - Public Bank Berhad - Mastercard and Visa
  - RHB Bank - Mastercard and Visa
  - Standard Chartered - Mastercard and Visa
  - United Overseas Bank - Mastercard and Visa

(i) denotes Islamic Only facilities.

- Consumer credit providers
  - Æon Credit Service - MasterCard and Visa
  - Synergy Cards Sdn Bhd

=== Charge cards issuers ===
Bank Issuer	Charge Card Endorser
Diners Club (Malaysia) Sdn Bhd*	Diners Club*
Maybank Berhad	American Express

* Left the Malaysian market

=== Malaysia debit card issuers ===
Bank Issuer	MEPS ATM	Main brand	Co-brand
Al-Rajhi Islamic Bank	MEPS	Visa Electron	Musafir-Hajj (SAR)
Affin Bank	MEPS	Mastercard	MyDebit
Affin Islamic	MEPS	Mastercard	MyDebit
Alliance Bank	MEPS	Mastercard	Maestro, MyDebit
AmBank	MEPS	Mastercard	MyDebit
Bank Islam	MEPS	Visa Electron	MyDebit
Bank of China (Malaysia)	-	Mastercard, Unionpay	
Bank Muamalat Malaysia Bhd	MEPS	Mastercard	MyDebit
Bank Rakyat	MEPS	Mastercard	MyDebit
Bank Simpanan Nasional	MEPS	Visa Electron	MyDebit
CIMB Bank	MEPS	Mastercard	MyDebit
Citibank(Sold to UOB Group Malaysia)	MEPS	Mastercard	MyDebit
Hong Leong Bank	MEPS	Mastercard	MyDebit
HSBC Bank	MEPS	Visa	MyDebit
ICBC Malaysia	MEPS	UnionPay	
Kuwait Finance House	MEPS	Visa Electron	-
Maybank	MEPS	Visa, Mastercard	MyDebit
MBSB Bank	MEPS	Visa	MyDebit
OCBC Bank	MEPS	Mastercard	MyDebit
Public Bank	MEPS	Visa, Unionpay, Mastercard	MyDebit
RHB Bank	MEPS	Visa, Mastercard	MyDebit
Ryt Bank	MEPS	Visa	MyDebit
Standard Chartered Bank	MEPS	Mastercard	MyDebit
United Overseas Bank	MEPS	Mastercard	MyDebit

So far Al-Rajhi Visa card BIN allows online purchases for flights and US purchases. Restricted for non-Halal uses such as Casino, Pub etc. Can be used at Genting Resorts.
E-MasterCard is the electronic Mastercard (non-embossed). It may be personalised.
NETS is the Network for Electronic Transfer System in Singapore for EFTPOS. ATM roaming use only.
All banks are BERHAD (Public Limited Company) except Bank Rakyat and BSN which are Coop and government entities respectively. Most mainline banks are now members of MEPS ATM. Withdrawal charges normally are about RM1 for major banks except where stated (as much as RM5 each time). All Visa card are non-embossed type except for Citibank Ready Credit accounts. Bank Rakyat, Muamalat, OCBC Bank do not co-brand their cards except for ATM use only. Maybank has the largest capitalisation in Malaysia in June 2018.

Central Bank of Malaysia expects all debit cards issued in Malaysia to be co-branded with the local network 'MyDebit' latest by the year 2017.

=== Prepaid card issuers ===
Bank issuer	Prepaid card endorser	Cost for starter pack	Cost to maintain
Merchantrade Asia	Visa	RM100	RM10 per annum.
AEON Credit Service	Mastercard	RM25	Free
Alliance Bank	Mastercard (DIGI Simple MasterCard)	Nil (for DiGi subscriber)	Nil*
AmBank Berhad	Mastercard (NextG)	RM25	RM3 per month*
Bank of China (Malaysia)	UnionPay	RM25	(For Chinese Yuan Card), usable overseas and charged in Chinese Yuan for every purchase. MYR Prepaid card is available again through the bank.
Bank Islam Berhad	Mastercard	RM50	Free but up to 3 years*
CIMB Bank Malaysia	Mastercard	RM10	RM10 per annum (Launched in conjunction with Lazada)
Maybank	American Express	RM15	RM6 per annum. Shell easiGo.
Maybank	Visa	RM20	RM6 per annum. Manchester United Card
RHB Bank Berhad	Visa	RM24	RM24 per annum.
RHB Bank Berhad	Visa	RM24	RM24 per annum. In partnership with Sogo Malaysia.
BigPay Malaysia	Mastercard	RM10 (Waived if performed an initial reload of RM20)	Waived unconditionally

* No longer available

== Other (skl-banking) skl-owned financial related organisations ==
- Cagamas Berhad
- EPF - Employees Provident Funds (KWSP - Kumpulan Wang Simpanan Pekerja)
- Permodalan Nasional Berhad (PNB)
- Treasury Malaysia
- National Economic Action Council
- Labuan Financial Service Authority (Labuan FSA)
- Malaysia Deposit Insurance Corporation
- Small and Medium Industries Development Corporation (SMIDEC)
- Pengurusan Danaharta Nasional Berhad
- The Iclif Leadership and Governance Centre (ICLIF)
- Inland Revenue Board
- Bursa Malaysia (KLSE - Kuala Lumpur Stock Exchange)
- Malaysia Derivatives Exchange Berhad
- Department of Statistics
- J. D. Zamora Trust Services (International Tax Collection Agent)

=== Affiliates ===
- Institute of Bankers Malaysia
- Malaysian Insurance Institute
- Association of Islamic Banking Institutions Malaysia
- Life Insurance Association of Malaysia
- General Insurance Association of Malaysia
- International Association of Insurance Supervisor
- Financial Mediation Bureau (FMB)
- Credit Counselling and Debt Management Agency (AKPK)
- Zamora Trading Malaysia (International Treaty Tax Authorized Collection Agent)

== Other private financial institutions ==
=== Licensed Money Lenders ===
- FK Capital Berhad
- Sri Guan Teik Enterprise Sdn Bhd
- Broadway money lenders
- Bhera Investment Berhad
- Easytop Capital Sdn Bhd
- SS SIong Wang Trading SS
- ACE Credit Berhad
- PS Alliance Sdn Bhd
- Maxmatic Capital sdn Bhd
- Safe Best Enterprise Sdn Bhd
- Euritage Sdn Bhd
- Fullup Credit Sdn Bhd
- Twomax Enterprise
- First Max Enterprise
- Perfect Million Capital Sdn Bhd
- Everlast Enterprise
- Bakti Mentari Enterprise
- Money Aim Enterprise
- Ultimax Management Services
- Well Delight Sdn Bhd
- Doritama Holding Sdn Bhd
- Kenanga Capital Sdn Bhd
- Fidelity Funding Sdn Bhd
- Amalan Credit Corporation Sdn Bhd
- Short Deposit Malaysia Private Bank Bhd
- Zamora Trading Sdn Bhd
- Max Loans Sdn Bhd
- Kawanku Enterprise
- Garnal Enterprise
- Sibu Kurnia Marine Sdn Bhd / IOUpay Pty Ltd

== Defunct, merged, acquired or renamed banks ==
- ABN (M) Berhad
- ABN AMRO (M) Berhad
- Abrar Finance Berhad
- Advance Finance Berhad
- Amanah Capital Partners Berhad
- Amanah International Finance Berhad
- Amanah Merchant Bank Berhad
- Amsterdamsche Bank (AB)
- Amsterdamsche-Rotterdamsche Bank NV (AMRO)
- Asia Commercial Finance Berhad (ACF Finance Berhad)
- Affin Finance Berhad
- Affin-ACF Finance Berhad
- Affin Investment Bank Berhad
- Affin Merchant Bank Berhad
- Affin Motor and Credit Finance Sdn Bhd
- Algemene Bank Nederland NV (ABN)
- Allied Bank Berhad
- Allied Finance Berhad
- Alliance Finance Berhad
- Alliance Merchant Bank Berhad
- AmFinance Berhad
- AmMerchant Bank Berhad
- ANZ Banking Group Ltd
- Agra and United Service Bank Ltd
- Agra and Masterman Bank Ltd
- Arab Malaysian Development Bank Berhad Now merged to be AmBank Berhad
- Arab Malaysian Development Finance Berhad
- Arab Malaysian Finance Berhad
- Arab Malaysian Merchant Bank Berhad
- Arab Malaysian Bank Berhad
- Arab Malaysian Industrial Finance Berhad
- Arab Investment for Asia
- Aseambankers Malaysia Berhad
- The Asiatic Bank Corporation
- Asian & Euro-American Merchant Bankers (Malaysia) Berhad
- Asian International Merchant Bankers Berhad
- Ban Hin Lee Bank Berhad
- Bank Agong (Apex Bank)
- Bank of America Asia (HK) Limited
- Bank Bumiputra Malaysia Berhad Merged with Bank of Commerce Berhad to form Bumiputra-Commerce, presently as CIMB
- Bank Buruh Berhad
- Bank Kerjasama Malaysia Berhad
- Bank Oriental
- Bank Negara Tanah Melayu
- Bank of Canton
- Bank of Commerce Berhad Merged with Bank Bumiputra Malaysia Berhad to form Bumiputra-Commerce, presently as CIMB without Borang I & J by Court announcement holder
- Bank of Communication
- Bank of Malaya
- Bank of Tokyo (M) Berhad
- Bank of Tokyo-Mitsubishi (M) Berhad
- Bank Simpanan Pejabat POS (POSB)
- Bank Persatuan Kerjasama Seberang Perai Berhad
- Bank Pertanian Malaysia Berhad Currently known as AgroBank
- Bank Pembangunan & Infrastruktur Malaysia Berhad
- Bank Pembangunan Sabah Berhad
- Bank Utama Berhad
- Banque de l'Indochine (Malaysian French Bank Berhad)
- Banque Indosuez
- Bank Industri & Teknologi Malaysia Berhad
- Bank Bumiputra Finance Berhad (BBMB Kewangan Berhad)
- Batu Pahat Bank
- Bian Chiang Bank Ltd
- British East India Company
- British North Borneo Company
- Bolton Finance Berhad
- Boon Siew Finance Berhad
- Board of Commissioners of Currency, Malaya
- Board of Commissioners of Currency, Malaya and British Borneo
- Borneo Development Corporation Sdn Bhd (Sabah)
- Borneo Development Corporation Sdn Bhd (Sarawak)
- BSN Commercial Bank
- BSN Finance Berhad
- BSN Merchant Bank Berhad
- Bumiputra Commerce Bank Berhad (BCB)
- Bumiputra Commerce Finance Berhad
- Bumiputra Merchant Bankers Berhad
- Cempaka Finance Berhad
- The Chase Manhattan Bank (M) Berhad
- Chartered Merchant Bankers Malaysia Berhad
- Central Bank of Malaya
- Chew Geok Lin Finance Berhad
- The Chartered Bank of India, Australia and China (The Chartered Bank)
- The Chartered Mercantile Bank of India, London and China (The Mercantile Bank)
- The Chinese Commercial Bank Ltd
- Chung Khiaw Bank (M) Berhad
- Chung Khiaw Finance (M) Berhad
- City Finance Berhad
- Co-Operative Central Banks Ltd
- Commercial Bank Corporation of India and the East
- Commerce International Merchant Bankers Berhad (CIMB)
- Commerce Tijari Bank Berhad
- Credit Corporation Malaysia
- D & D Finance Berhad
- D & C Sakura Merchant Bankers Berhad
- Dai-Kangyo Bank (M) Berhad
- Delta Finance Berhad
- Delta Leasing sdn.bhd
- Development & Commercial Bank Berhad (DCB Bank)
- Development & Commercial Bank Finance Berhad (DCB Finance)
- Edaran Otomobil Nasional Bank Berhad (EON Bank Berhad)
- Edaran Otomobil Nasional Finance Berhad (EON Finance)
- European Asian Bank Berhad
- Federated Malay States Pos Office Savings Bank
- Federal & colonial Building Society Limited
- First Malaysia Finance Berhad
- The First National City Bank of New York
- First National City Bank
- Habib Bank Ltd
- Ho Hong Bank Ltd
- Hock Hua Bank Berhad
- Hock Hua Finance Berhad
- Hong Kong Bank (M) Berhad
- The Hong Kong Shanghai Banking Company Limited
- Hong Leong Credit Berhad
- Hong Leong Finance Berhad
- Hwang-DBS Investment Bank Berhad
- I.M.A.Sdn Bhd
- Indian Overseas Bank Ltd
- Indian Bank Ltd
- Interfinance Berhad
- International Banking Corporation
- International Merchant Bankers Berhad
- Intradagang Merchant Bankers (M) Berhad
- J.P. Morgan Chase & Co.
- K & N Kenanga Berhad
- KCB Finance Berhad
- Kewangan KGN Berhad
- Kewangan Pekembarjaya Berhad
- Kewangan Bersatu Berhad
- Kewangan Industrial Berhad
- Kewangan Usaha Bersatu Berhad
- Kewangan Usahasama Makmur Berhad
- Kewangan Utama Berhad
- Kong Ming Bank Berhad
- Kong Ming Finance Corporation Berhad
- Kuala Lumpur Finance Berhad
- Kwantung Provincial Bank Limited
- Kwong Lee Mortgage & Remittance Company
- Kwong Lee Bank Berhad
- Kwong Yik Banking Company
- Kwong Yik Banking Corporation
- Kwong Yik Bank Berhad
- Kwong Yik Finance Berhad
- Lee Wah Bank Ltd
- Magnum Finance Berhad
- Malaya and British Borneo Currency Commission Board (MBBCCB)
- Malaya Borneo Building Society Limited
- Malaysia Credit Finance Berhad
- Malayan Banking Corporation
- Malayan United Bank Berhad
- Malaysian Industrial Finance Corporation Limited
- Malaysian Industrial Finance Company Limited
- Malaysian International Finance Berhad
- Malaysian International Merchant Bankers Berhad (MIMB)
- Mayban Finance Berhad
- Malayan Finance Corporation Berhad
- Malayan United Industries Bank Berhad (MUI Bank)
- Malayan United Industries Finance Berhad (MUI Finance)
- MBF Finance Berhad
- MBF Leasing Sdn Bhd
- MIMB Investment Bank Berhad
- Multinational Bank of United Kingdom
- Multi-Purpose Bank Berhad
- Multi-Purpose Finance Berhad
- National Australia Bank Limited (NAB)
- National Bank Of Australasia Limited (NBA)
- The National City Bank of New York
- National Commercial Bank
- Nationale Handelsbank
- Nationale Bank voor Middellang Krediet (National Bank for Medium-Term Credit)
- Netherland Hondele Bank
- The Nederlandsch-Indische Handelsbank
- Nederlandsche Handel-Maatschappij
- The Netherlands Trading Society
- North Western Bank of India
- The Oriental Bank Corporation
- The New Oriental Bank Corporation Limited
- Oriental Bank Berhad
- Oversea-Chinese Bank Ltd
- Oversea-Chinese Banking Corporation Finance (M) Berhad (OCBC Finance)
- Overseas Chinese Union Bank Limited
- Overseas Union Bank (M) Berhad (OUB Bank)
- Overseas Union Trust (M) Berhad
- P & O Banking Corporation
- Pacific Development Credit Berhad
- The Pacific Bank Berhad
- Perak Savings Bank
- Perdana Finance Berhad
- Perdana Merchant Bankers Berhad
- Perkasa Finance Berhad
- Permata Chartered Merchant Bank Berhad
- Permata Merchant Bank Berhad
- Pertama Malaysia Finance Berhad
- Pertanian Baring Sanwa Multinational Berhad
- Petra Finance Berhad
- Pewira Affin Bank Berhad
- Pewira Affin Merchant Bank Berhad
- Pewira Habib Bank Malaysia Berhad
- Phileo Allied Bank Berhad
- Phileo Allied Finance Berhad
- Pos Office Savings Bank
- The Province Wellesley Co-operative Banking Union Limited
- Public Finance Berhad
- Public Merchant Bank Berhad
- Rakyat First Merchant Bankers Berhad
- Rashid Hussein Bank Delta Finance Berhad (RHB Finance)
- RHB Sakura Merchant Bankers Berhad
- Rotterdamsche Bank NV (RB)
- Sabah Bank Berhad
- Sabah Finance Berhad
- Sanwa Bank of Japan
- Security Pacific Asian Bank Ltd
- Selangor Savings Bank
- Separate Savings Bank (Straits Settlement Post Office Savings Bank)
- Sime Bank Berhad
- Sime Darby Investment Services Ltd
- Sime Finance Berhad
- Sime Merchant Bankers Berhad
- Southern Banking Limited
- Southern Bank Berhad
- Southern Finance Berhad
- Southern Investment Bank Berhad
- Supreme Finance Berhad
- Syarikat Permodalan Kebangsaan Berhad
- Sze Hai Tong Banking and Insurance Company
- Tenaga Finance Berhad
- Unfederated Malay States Pos Office Savings Bank
- The Union Bank of Culcutta
- Terengganu Finance Berhad
- United Asian Bank Berhad
- United Commercial Bank Ltd
- United Chinese Bank Ltd
- United Malayan Banking Corporation Berhad (UMBC)
- United Malayan Banking Corporation Finance Berhad (UMBC Finance)
- United Malayan Banking Berhad
- United Merchant Finance Berhad
- United National Finance Berhad
- Utama Merchant Finance Berhad
- Utama Merchant Bank Berhad
- Utama Wardley Berhad
- Visia Finance Berhad
- Vereenigde Oostindische Compagnie - VOC (Dutch/Netherlands East Indies-Dutch East India Company)
- Wah Tat Bank Berhad
- The Yokohama Specie Bank Limited

(more to come)

== Securities Commission skl related licensed intermediaries (Stock Broking related firms) ==
=== 80 Licensed Fund Managers (+ Futures Fund Managers) ('full list) ===
- Aberdeen Asset Management Sdn Bhd
- Affin Hwang Asset Management Berhad
- AIG Global Investment Corporation (Malaysia) Sdn Bhd
- AIMS Asset Management Sdn Bhd (+ Futures)
- Alliance Capital Asset Management Sdn Bhd (+ Futures)
- Alpha Asset MAnagement Berhad
- Amanah Saham Kedah Berhad
- Amanah SSCM Asset Management Sdn Bhd
- AmanahRaya - JMF Asset Management Sdn Bhd (+ Futures)
- AmInvestment Management Sdn Bhd (+ Futures)
- Apex Investment Services Berhad
- Areca Capital Sdn Bhd
- ASM Investment Service Berhad
- Assar Asset Management Sdn Bhd
- Avenue Invest Berhad (+ Futures)
- Ayman Capital Sdn Bhd
- BIMB Unit Trust Management Sdn Bhd
- Behra Investment Berhad
- BIMSEC Asset Management Sdn Bhd
- BTR Capital Partners Sdn Bhd
- Bumiwerk Asset Management Sdn Bhd
- The Capital Dynamics Asset Management Sdn Bhd
- CIMB-Principal Asset Management Berhad (+ Futures)
- CMS Dresdner Asset Management Sdn Bhd
- Easset Management Sdn Bhd
- ECM Libra capital Markets Sdn Bhd
- First Bond Asset Management Sdn Bhd
- Fortitude Asset Management Sdn Bhd
- Fortress Capital Asset Management Sdn Bhd
- Fulcrum Asset Management Sdn Bhd
- Golden Touch Asset Management Sdn Bhd
- Hadrons Capital Sdn Bhd
- Hickham Capital Management Sdn Bhd
- HLG Asset Management Sdn Bhd (+ Futures)
- Hong Leong Fund Management Sdn Bhd
- ING Funds Berhad
- Inter-Pacific Asset Management Sdn Bhd
- Itrinsic Capital Management Sdn Bhd
- IUB Asset Management Sdn Bhd
- KAF Investment Funds Berhad (+ Futures)
- Kenanga Asset Management Sdn Bhd
- Kenanga Investment Management Sdn Bhd
- Kenanga Unit Trust Berhad (+ Futures)
- Kestrel Capital Partners (M) Sdn Bhd
- KLCS Asset Management Sdn Bhd (+ Futures)
- Kumpulan Sentiasa Cermelang Sdn Bhd (+ Futures)
- Mayban Investment Management Sdn Bhd
- Mercury Asset Management Sdn Bhd
- Meridian Asset Management Sdn Bhd
- MTC Asset Management (M) Sdn Bhd
- Muamalat Avenue Sdn Bhd (+ Futures)
- Navis Management Sdn Bhd
- Opus Asset Management Sdn Bhd (+ Futures)
- OSK International Asset Management Sdn Bhd (+ Futures)
- OSK-UOB Unit Trust Management Berhad
- Pacific Mutual Fund Berhad
- PacificMas Asset Management Sdn Bhd
- PCB Asset Management Sdn Bhd
- Pelaburan Johor Berhad
- Pengurusan Kumipa Berhad
- Perkasa Normandy Managers Sdn Bhd
- Permodalan Nasional Berhad
- PFM Capital Holdings Sdn Bhd
- Pheim Asset Management Sdn Bhd (+ Futures)
- Philip Capital Management Sdn Bhd
- PowerHouse Asset Management Sdn Bhd
- PRB Asset Management Sdn Bhd
- Premier Investment Management Sdn Bhd
- Prudential Fund Management Berhad
- PTB Unit Trust Berhad
- Public Mutual Berhad
- RHB Asset Management Sdn Bhd (+ Futures)
- SBB Asset Management Sdn Bhd (+ Futures)
- Singular Asset Management Sdn Bhd
- SJ Asset Management Sdn Bhd
- Suria Asset Management Sdn Bhd
- Trillium Advisory Investment Management Berhad
- UOB-OSK Asset Management Sdn Bhd
- TA Asset Management Sdn Bhd (Futures only)
- VCB Capital Sdn Bhd
- Zamora Holdings Sdn Bhd

=== 16 Licensed Futures Brokers (full list) ===
- Affin Hwang Futures Sdn Bhd (formerly known as HDM Futures Sdn Bhd)
- AmFutures Sdn Bhd
- Apex Futures Sdn Bhd
- Avenue Securities Sdn Bhd
- CIMB Futures Sdn Bhd
- Fedrums Sdn Bhd
- Fontanazz Futures Sdn Bhd
- Innosabah Options & futures Sdn Bhd
- Inter-Pacific Futures Sdn Bhd
- Kenanga Deutsche Futures Sdn Bhd
- Okachi (Malaysia) Sdn Bhd
- Oriental Pacific Futures Sdn Bhd
- OSK Futures & Options Sdn Bhd
- RHB Futures Sdn Bhd
- Sunny Futures Sdn Bhd
- TA Futures Sdn Bhd

=== 37 Licensed Dealers (full list) ===
- A.A.Anthony Securities Sdn Bhd (bought by UOB Kayhian)
- Affin Securities Sdn Bhd
- AmSecurities Sdn Bhd
- Avenue Securities Sdn Bhd
- BIMB Securities Sdn Bhd
- CIMB Securities Sdn Bhd
- CLSA Securities Malaysia Sdn Bhd
- Credit Suisse Securities (Malaysia) Sdn Bhd
- EONCAP Securities Sdn Bhd
- FA Securities Sdn Bhd
- HLG Securities Sdn Bhd
- Hwang-DBS Securities Sdn Bhd
- Innosabah Securities Berhad (bought by UOB Kayhian)
- Inter-Pacific Securities Sdn Bhd
- JF Apex Securities Berhad
- JPMorgan Securities (Malaysia) Sdn Bhd
- Jupiter Securities Sdn Bhd
- K*N Kenanga Berhad
- KAF-Seagroatt & Campbell Securities Sdn Bhd
- Kuwait Finance House (Malaysia) Berhad
- M&A Securities Sdn Bhd
- Macquarie (Malaysia) Sdn Bhd
- Malaysian Issuing House Sdn Bhd (Issuing House)
- Mercury Securities Sdn Bhd
- MIDF Consultancy & Corporate Services Sdn Bhd (Issuing House)
- MIDF Sisma Securities Sdn Bhd
- Nomura Securities Malaysia Sdn Bhd
- OSK Securities Berhad
- RHB Securities Sdn Bhd
- SBB Securities Sdn Bhd
- SJ Securities Sdn Bhd
- TA Securities Holdings Bhd
- UBS Securities Malaysia Sdn Bhd
- UOB KAY HIAN SECURITIES (M)SDN BHD
- Zamora Trading Sdn Bhd

=== List of Defunct Securities Commission related licensed intermediaries ===
- AIGIC (M) Sdn Bhd
- Allied Avenue Assets Securities Sdn Bhd
- Allied Philip Capital Management Sdn Bhd
- AMMB asset Management Sdn Bhd
- Arab Malaysian Securities Sdn Bhd
- Avenue Asset Management Services Sdn Bhd
- Avenue Unit Trust Berhad
- CMS Dresdner Thornton Asset Management Sdn Bhd
- Commerce Trust Berhad
- Fima Asset Management Sdn Bhd
- FOS Asset Sdn Bhd
- IR Asset Management Sdn Bhd
- J.B Securities Sdn Bhd
- JMF Asset Management Sdn Bhd
- Libra Capital Markets Sdn Bhd
- Premier Capital Management Sdn Bhd
- Rashid Hussein Securities Sdn Bhd
- Towry Law Asset Management Sdn Bhd
- Hwang-DBS Unit Trust Berhad
- Merchant Holdings Sdn Bhd
- Seacorp-Schroder Capital Management Berhad
- Inter-Pacific Portfolio Managers Sdn Bhd
- KAF Management Services Sdn Bhd*Mestika Utama Sdn Bhd
- Prudential Unit Trust Berhad
- Rashid Hussein Asset Management Sdn Bhd
- SDB Asset Management Sdn Bhd
- TA Unit Trust Management Berhad
- Leong & Company Sdn Bhd
- Seagroatt & Campbell Sdn Bhd
- Pengkalan Securities Sdn Bhd
- Bolty Securities Sdn Bhd
- Mohaiyani Securities Sdn Bhd
- ShareTech Securities Sdn Bhd
- Labuan Securities Sdn Bhd

(more to come)

== Investment-Link funds (Insurance companies - Takaful included) ==
=== 8 Life and General Businesses(full list) ===
- AmAssurance Berhad
- American International Assurance Co Ltd (AIA)
- Hong Leong Assurance Berhad
- ING Insurance Berhad
- Malaysia National Insurance Berhad (MNI)
- Malaysian Assurance Alliance Berhad
- MCIS Insurance Berhad
- Prudential Assurance (M) Berhad

=== 8 Life Businesses(full list) ===
- Allianz Life Insurance (Malaysia) Berhad
- Asia Life (Malaysia) Berhad
- AXA Affin Life Insurance Berhad
- Commerce Life Assurance (Malaysia) Berhad
- Great Eastern Life Assurance (Malaysia) Berhad
- Manulife Insurance (M) Berhad
- Maybank Life Assurance Berhad
- Uni.Asia Life Assurance Berhad

=== 26 General Businesses(full list) ===
- ACE Synergy Insurance Berhad
- Allianz General Insurance Malaysia Berhad
- American Home Assurance Company
- AMI Insurans Berhad
- Asia Insurance (Malaysia) Berhad
- AXA Affin General Insurance Berhad
- Berjaya General Insurance Berhad
- Jerneh Insurance Berhad
- Kurnia Insurans (Malaysia) Berhad
- Lonpac Insurance Berhad
- Mayban General Assurance Berhad
- Mitsui Sumitomo Insurance (Malaysia) Berhad (MSIG)
- MPI Generali Insurans Berhad (formerly known as Multi-Purpose Insurans Bhd)
- MUI Continental Insurance Berhad
- Oriental Capital Assurance Berhad
- Overseas Assurance Corporation (Malaysia) Berhad
- Pacific & Orient Insurance Co. Berhad
- Pacific Insurance Berhad, The
- PanGlobal Insurance Berhad
- Progressive Insurance Berhad
- QBE Insurance Berhad
- RHB Insurance Berhad
- Royal & Sun Alliance Insurance (Malaysia) Berhad
- Tahan Insurance Malaysia Berhad
- Tokio Marine Insurans (Malaysia) Berhad
- Uni.Asia General Insurance Berhad

=== 1 Life and General Reinsurance Businesses (full list) ===
- Hannover Rueckversicherungs AG

=== 1 Life Reinsurance Businesses (full list) ===
- Malaysian Life Reinsurance Group Berhad

=== 4 General Reinsurance Business (full list) ===
- Malaysian Reinsurance Berhad
- Munchener Ruckversicherungs-Gesellschaft
- Swiss Reinsurance Company
- The TOA Reinsurance Company Ltd.

=== 12 Takaful Operators (full list) ===
- Sun Life Takaful
- HSBC Amanah Takaful (Malaysia) Sdn Bhd
- Etiqa Takaful Berhad
- Prudential BSN Takaful Berhad
- Syarikat Takaful Malaysia Berhad
- Takaful Ikhlas Sdn. Bhd
- Takaful Nasional Sdn. Bhd.
- Hong Leong MSIG Takaful
- Great Eastern Takaful Sdn Bhd
- AIA AFG Takaful Berhad
- AmMetLife Takaful Berhad
- AIA PUBLIC Takaful Berhad
- MAA Takaful Berhad

=== Defunct Insurance companies ===
- Aetna Universal Insurance Berhad
- ACE Insurance Limited
- AMAL Assurance Berhad
- AMI Insurance Berhad
- The Asia Insurance Company Limited
- AVIVA Insurance Berhad
- AXA Affin Assurance Berhad
- Berjaya General Insurance Sdn Bhd
- Commerce Assurance Berhad
- EON CMG Life Assurance Berhad
- Hong Leong Assurance Sdn Bhd
- John Hancock Life Insurance Berhad
- Industrial &z\ Commercial Insurance Berhad
- KSM Insurans Berhad
- Kompas Insurans Berhad
- London & Pacific Insurance Company Berhad
- Malaysia National Reinsurance Berhad
- Malaysia Pacific Insurance Berhad (MPI)
- Mayban Assurance Berhad
- MBA Life Assurance Berhad
- MBF Insurans Berhad
- MCIS Insurance Berhad
- National Employers' Mutual General Insurance Association Limited
- The Netherlands Insurance Co. Est 1845 Ltd
- The Netherlands Insurance (M) Sdn Bhd
- Oriental Capital Assurance Berhad
- Overseas Union Insurance Berhad
- The Pacific Netherlands Insurance Berhad
- Perdana CIGNA Insurance Berhad
- People's Insurance Company (M) Berhad
- Progressive Insurance Sdn Bhd
- South East Insurance Berhad
- South East Asia Insurance Berhad
- Sri Bumi Insurance Sdn Bhd
- Talasco Insurance Berhad
- Tenaga Insurance Berhad
- The Tokio Marine and Fire Insurance Company
- The Tokio Marine and Fire Insurance (M) Sdn Bhd
- United Malayan Banking Corporation Insurance Berhad (UMBC Insurance)
- United Prime Insurance ( M ) Sdn Bhd
- Wing on Fire & marine Insurance
- Zurich Insurance (Malaysia) Berhad

(More to come)

== See also ==
- Asset management in Malaysia
- Bursa Malaysia (Kuala Lumpur Stock Exchange)
- Economy of Malaysia
- Foreign direct investment
- Islamic banking in Malaysia
- Malaysian Electronic Payment System
- Malaysian Ringgit
