= Aid and relief efforts during the COVID-19 pandemic in Malaysia =

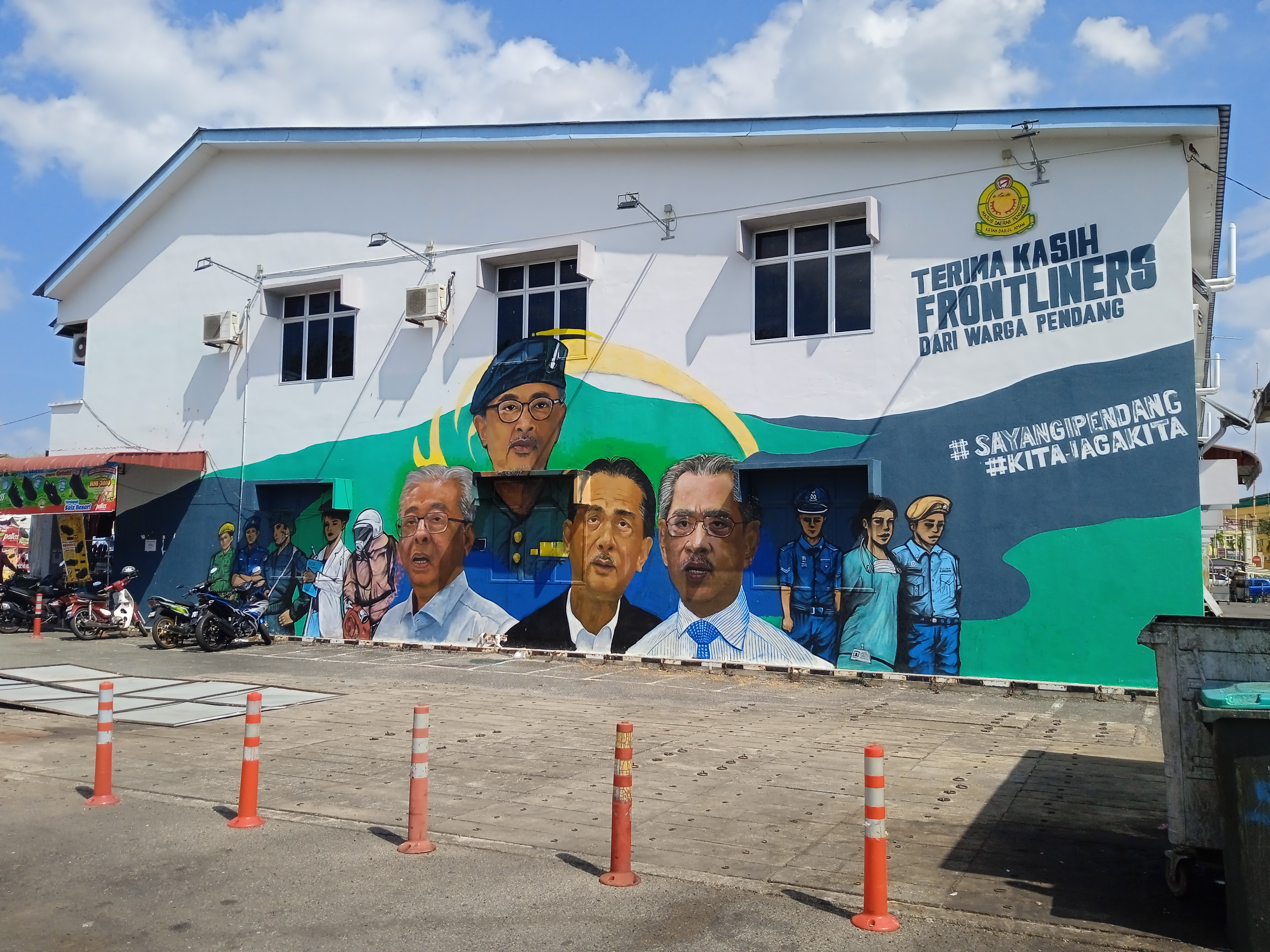
"Terima Kasih Frontliners" (literally means "Thank You Frontliners") mural at Pendang, Kedah

The Government of Malaysia along with various non governmental organisations (NGOs), companies, and foreign governments introduced various financial aid and relief programs in response to the economic impacts of the COVID-19 pandemic in Malaysia. On 27 March 2020, Prime Minister Muhyiddin Yassin introduced an economic stimulus package known as the Prihatin ("caring package") worth RM250 billion.

Between January and March 2020, the Sabah state government and various NGOs raised aid and medical supplies for China. Following the rise in COVID-19 cases in Malaysia, local companies and the Chinese government were involved in the distribution of aid and medical supplies in Malaysia. In addition, Malaysia received aid from the United Arab Emirates, Singapore, Taiwan, Turkey and the multinational corporation McDonald's.

Mercy Malaysia, the Malaysian Red Crescent Society along with various banks and telecommunications companies also provided customers with various forms of financial assistances and discounted services during the pandemic.

== Economic stimulus plan ==
On 23 March 2020, the Malaysian Government allocated RM600 million to the Ministry of Health for the purchase of equipment and to hire contract personnel, especially nurses. It has also announced that contributors of the Employees Provident Fund (EPF) can withdraw up to RM500 per month for 12 months.

On 27 March, Prime Minister Muhyiddin Yassin launched an economic stimulus package known as the Prihatin ("caring package") worth RM250 billion. This package consists of RM128 billion for welfare assistance, RM100 billion to support small and medium businesses, RM2 billion to strengthen the country's economy, and a RM20 billion stimulus package that was previously announced by the government. An allocation of RM130 million was also distributed equally to all states to help overcome the COVID-19 pandemic. In addition, the central bank Bank Negara Malaysia also cut interest rates to 1%.

The details of the plan are:

1. Budget of RM500 million to the Ministry of Health to enhance the health and resources of the ministry.
2. The government raises special allowances for healthcare workers from RM400 to RM600 a month from 1 April until the end of the pandemic.
3. Additional special allowance of RM200 per month for frontliner for police, immigration, Customs Department, Malaysian Civil Defence Force and RELA Corps personnel.
4. Aid of RM1,600 to households earning less than RM4,000, with RM1,000 paid in April and RM600 in May.
5. National Concerns fund with RM10 billion worth of cash payments will be provided to groups B40 and M40, including private workers, farmers and fishermen. These include RM1,600 to four million households earning RM4,000 and below; RM1,000 for households earning RM4,000 above; RM800 for Malaysians aged 21 and over who earn RM2,000 and below; RM500 for Malaysians aged 21 and over earns between RM2,000 and RM4,000.
6. RM200 of one-time assistance to affected higher education institution students.
7. Free internet from April onwards until the end of the MCO.
8. The joint government of TNB will increase the allocation of RM530 million for a discount of between 15% and 50% for electricity usage up to 600 kW [sic] per month for six months from the April bill.
9. Exemption of rent for Program Perumahan Rakyat and public housing for six months.
10. Insurance and takaful companies set aside RM8 million to cover COVID-19 inspection costs up to RM300 per policyholder.
11. Government to provide a payment of RM500 to approximately 120,000 e-hailing drivers starting 1 April.
12. The Government and Bank Negara Malaysia will set aside an additional allocation of RM4.5 billion for SMEs and micro-entrepreneurs which will consist of five initiatives.
13. One-off RM500 aid for 120,000 e-hailing drivers nationwide with an allocation of RM60 million. This is in addition to the one-time assistance announced for taxi drivers announced in the previous stimulus package.
14. The government will pay the salaries incurred by contractors involved in the service sector, such as cleaning services and food supplies cooked at government agencies.
15. The government will introduce a subsidy of RM600 a month for three months for employers with a 50% reduction since 1 January, for workers with less than RM4,000 in salaries.
16. The government will continue all projects allocated in the 2020 Budget, including ECRL, MRT2 and the National Sustainability and Sustainability Plan (NFCP) in line with its focus on ensuring sustainable economic development.
17. Human Resources Development Fund (HRDF) is tax-exempted for all sectors for six months beginning April 2020.
18. Federal government premises such as school cafeteria, nursery, cafeteria and convenience store are exempt from rent for six months.
19. Government pensioners to receive RM500 cash assistance.

Prime Minister Muhyiddin Yassin launched a special stimulus plan on 6 April, worth RM10 billion aimed at small and medium-sized enterprises (SMEs) to mitigate the impact of action control orders (MCO). Muhyiddin said that SMEs and micro-enterprises accounted for two-thirds of the country's manpower and contributed 40% of the country's economy. This is in addition to other economic stimulus plans that increase cash flow to ensure that the economy will not collapse.

On 5 June, the Prime Minister announced the Short-Term Economic Recovery Plan (Penjana) to alleviate the effects of the pandemic. The details of the plan are:

1. Nearly RM9 billion to address rising unemployment.
2. The Wage Subsidy Programme to be extended for another three months.
3. Employers can apply for the Wage Subsidy Programme if they were not allowed to operate during CMCO.
4. Penjana has 40 initiatives worth RM35 billion, of which RM10 billion is a direct fiscal injection by the government.
5. An employment subsidy programme worth RM1.5 billion for companies hiring unemployed people.
6. Companies that employ Malaysians under 40 to be given RM800 per worker while those that employ Malaysians above 40 or disabled people to be given RM1,000, for a period of six months.
7. Public transport users can pay RM30 per month for unlimited rides from 15 June to 31 December.
8. Grants for daycare centre operators for abiding standard operating procedures.
9. E-vouchers for those ordering childcare services online.
10. Up to RM3,000 incentive of individual income tax for fees paid by parents to daycare centres and kindergartens.
11. RM70 million for the Shop Malaysia Online campaign.
12. RM2 billion by the banking sector to assist SMEs, with a threshold of RM500,000 per SME.
13. RM400 million to fund the Penjana microcredit by Tekun and Bank Simpanan Nasional, with RM50 million for female entrepreneurs.
14. RM1 billion for the tourism industry under the Penjana Tourism Funding.
15. Cash-flow aid by SME Bank for G2 and G3 contractors that are awarded minor government projects.
16. RM10 million for the Malaysian Global Innovation and Creativity Centre to fund social enterprises for social projects.
17. The Penjana Nasional fund worth RM600 million to drive the process of digitalisation of businesses and innovation.
18. RM75 million for draft policies related to the gig economy.
19. RM50 million matching grant for gig workers' EPF and Socso contributions.
20. RM75 million to e-wallets, or RM50 per person.
21. Full tax exemption for purchase of locally assembled cars from June to 31 December.
22. RM50 million for the Malaysian Investment Development Authority for promotional and marketing activities.
23. Full exemption of tourism tax from 1 July 2020 to 30 June 2021.
24. Exemption of services tax on lodgings and accommodation services from 1 September 2020 to 30 June 2021.
25. Waiver of penalty to companies that are late in submitting payment for sales and services tax.
26. Free 1GB of Internet data from 8 a.m. to 6 p.m. daily until 31 December.
27. Stamp duty exemption for transfer of property limited to the first RM1 million of home price.
28. Stamp duty exemption for loan agreements for purchase of home between RM300,000 and RM2.5 million effective for sales and purchase agreements signed from 1 June 2020 to 31 May 2021.
29. Real property gains tax exemption for disposal of up to three properties from 1 June 2020 to 31 December 2021.

== Exchange of aid between Malaysia and other countries ==
=== January–February aid to China ===
Malaysian aid organisation #OpsHarapan aimed to collect 10,000 N95 face masks for its relief efforts to Wuhan. A total of 18 million pieces of medical gloves were donated by Malaysia to assist China in their struggle against the virus. The Malaysia's state Government of Sabah has raised RM2 million for the "Wuhan Fund" which will be channelled to China as a sign of solidarity with the country during the outbreak. The state government fund's earlier target was RM1 million although the amount received exceeded the initial target when a local philanthropist contributed RM40,000 (US$9,548). The fundraising was organised in a joint event called "We Love, We Care" by the Sabah government and Chinese associations. A group of musicians in Malaysia also published a song to support China in their struggle against the virus titled "You Are Not Alone" which was featured in a show in Malaysia's capital of Kuala Lumpur.

=== March–April aid to Malaysia ===
On 23 March 2020, the Malaysian government urged local PPE manufacturers to step their production due to reports that Malaysia's healthcare workers faced a shortage of PPE, resorting to clingwrap and plastic wrap for making DIY protective suits which had to be changed up to 5 times per day. On 16 March 2020, Malaysia's Prime Minister announced that the Chinese ambassador in Malaysia has declared China's willingness to help by supplying face masks and disinfectants. The first medical supplies were sent to Sungai Buloh Hospital on 19 March. A further 100,000 face masks were sent by the President of China-Asia Economic Development Association to Malaysia. Along the same day, Chinese Alibaba Group founder Jack Ma further announced that through his foundation, a total of 2 million masks, 150,000 test kits, 20,000 protective suits and 20,000 face shields will be sent to four Southeast Asian countries including Malaysia to aid these nations in their struggle against the virus. A further total of 1,000 face masks, 20,000 medical masks, 100 protective clothing and 100 goggles were contributed by China specifically for the Malaysian police forces.

China's Consulate-General in Kota Kinabalu also has announced that medical aid to be dispatched to Sabah to aid their struggle against the virus and reciprocate the people's of Sabah recent assistance to Mainland China during the outbreak. On 25 March, a further total of 5,500 test kits were delivered to Malaysia's Health Ministry by China through its several business entities operating in Malaysia. On 26 March, 20,000 N95 face masks were delivered by China for the Malaysia's state of Sarawak frontline healthcare workers. By 29 March, China delivered a total of 83 boxes of face masks with 2,000 pieces to Malaysia's state of Sabah.

A further 170,000 boxes of face masks, 1,000 sets of personal protective equipment (PPE), 200 pairs of goggles, hand sanitisers and surgical masks were delivered by China to the Sabah state government on 30 March. Another 20,000 surgical masks destined for Sabah's healthcare frontliner workers were delivered in early April. A total of 30,000 face masks were delivered by China through its Consulate General in Kuching specifically for the Sarawak State Disaster Management Committee. Malaysia has asked China's medical experts to share their experience with Malaysia's frontliners, to be accomplished through a videoconference between their doctors on 26 March 2020. On 13 April 2020, Malaysia's health ministry announced that Malaysian hospitals will run out of PPE supplies in two weeks, calling upon NGO's and other parties to donate their PPE supplies.

== Aid from other countries ==
The Malaysian government also received aid from the United Arab Emirates, which included 600,000 face masks, 200 ventilators, about 100,000 test kits and 50,000 protective clothes. Neighbouring Singapore had donated 5,000 universal transport medium (UTM) swabs, a critical component in test kits which can test for a case of the virus within minutes. Malaysia also among the seven countries in Taiwan further aid lists following the former request of face masks supplies, with Taiwan starting its second round of surgical mask donations to severely hit countries in Latin America and Southeast Asia from 9 April after its donations to Europe and the United States had been fulfilled. Taiwanese Tzu Chi foundation also donated essential food and equipment to hospitals and clinics in Malaysia. Turkey-based Independent Industrialists' and Businessmen's Association's (MUSIAD) had distributed free face masks to shoppers at a mall in Malaysia's capital of Kuala Lumpur on 11 April to assist the country's efforts in their fight against the virus. McDonald's Malaysia, which is part of an American fast-food franchise, donated food to about 50 hospitals in the country, to reach 15,000 healthcare workers, and also to other frontliners such as the police and army personnel.

== Local pandemic fund within Malaysia ==
Following the severely strained healthcare system due to the increasing number of infections by the virus, Mercy Malaysia launched the "Covid-19 Pandemic Fund" to supporting medical services and the essential needs of marginalised groups within the country. Various Malaysian crowdfunding platforms joined hands in raising money to supply frontline health workers with critical protective equipment and supplies. The Malaysian Red Crescent Society also launched the #responsMALAYSIA (Malaysia's Response) initiative to support frontliners.

Various Malaysian states have launched their own stimulus packages and announced immediate financial aid in the form of rental waivers and deferment of student loan repayments to help their citizens to cope throughout the virus outbreak. In addition, the federal government of Malaysia also announced it will disburse a total of RM130 million equally among Malaysia's 13 states to help small traders, the infected individuals and front-line staff especially those in the healthcare sector. The country Prime Minister, Deputy Prime Minister, all other ministers and deputy ministers had contributed two months of their salaries to the COVID-19 Fund of Malaysia has been announced by the Prime Minister's Office statement issued on 26 March.

In February, Malaysia's home improvement retailer MR DIY distributed a total of 3.5 million free face masks nationwide to help curb the spread of the virus. Further in March, Coway Malaysia donated a total of 100,000 pieces of surgical face masks to PDRM in an effort to help safeguard police personnel who are on the frontlines during the global pandemic.

Various Malaysian banks such as Affin Bank, Agrobank, Alliance Bank, AmBank, Bank Islam Malaysia, Bank Muamalat Malaysia, Bank Rakyat, Bank Simpanan Nasional, CIMB, Hong Leong Bank, HSBC Bank Malaysia, Maybank, MBSB Bank, OCBC Bank, Public Bank Berhad, RHB Bank and SME Bank has offered measures including financial assistance for its customers amidst the virus crisis.

== Local broadcasting and telecommunications companies aid ==
To keep the Malaysian public entertained during the movement control order period, both Malaysia's pay television and internet services of Unifi offers free access to all Unifi TV channels while its mobile prepaid of Unifi Mobile offers unlimited data. Astro also offers free access to all of its paid movie channels through both basic Astro and Astro GO mobile application. Starting from 1 April, all telecommunication companies in the country have been instructed by the government to provide free internet data usage to their respective customers throughout the movement control order period has been published in the website of Malaysian Communications and Multimedia Commission (MCMC). The MCMC has announced that Malaysia's mobile telecommunication companies of Celcom, Digi, Maxis and U Mobile will be offering its prepaid and postpaid customers free 1GB of high-speed data, which is to be used daily between 8 am to 6 pm.
