= Payments Network Malaysia =

Malaysian finance company

Payments Network Malaysia Sdn Bhd
- Type: Private limited company
- Industry: Payment system
- Predecessor: MEPS; MyClear
- Founded: 1 August 2017; 9 years ago
- Headquarters: Level 8, Menara Southpoint @ Mid Valley City, Medan Syed Putra Selatan, 59200 Kuala Lumpur, Malaysia
- Area served: Malaysia
- Key people: Anwar Ibrahim (CEO)
- Products: eSPICK; Interbank GIRO; JomPAY; MyDebit; FPX; DuitNow; DuitNow QR; online google
- Services: Financial services
- Parent: Bank Negara Malaysia; Maybank; RHB Bank; Public Bank; CIMB Bank; AmBank; Hong Leong Bank; Affin Bank; Alliance Bank; Bank Islam; Bank Muamalat; Bank Rakyat
- Subsidiaries: Malaysian Electronic Payment System Sdn Bhd; MEPS Currency Management Sdn Bhd
- Website: paynet.my

Payments Network Malaysia Sdn Bhd (PayNet) is the national payments network and shared central infrastructure for Malaysia’s financial markets. It was formed from the merger between the Malaysian Electronic Payment System (MEPS) and Malaysian Electronic Clearing Corporation Sdn Bhd (MyClear) on 1 August 2017. PayNet is Malaysia's premier payments network and central infrastructure for financial markets.

Bank Negara Malaysia (BNM) owns a majority share in PayNet, along with eleven other local financial institutions as joint shareholders.

== History ==
PayNet was formed on 1 August 2017 from the merger of MEPS and My Clear.

=== Project Nexus ===
The Bank for International Settlements signed an agreement with Central Bank of Malaysia, Bank of Thailand, Bangko Sentral ng Pilipinas, Monetary Authority of Singapore, and the Reserve Bank of India on 30 June 2024 as founding member of Project Nexus, a multilateral international initiative to enable retail cross-border payments. Bank Indonesia involved as a special observer. The platform, which is expected to go live by 2026, will interlink domestic fast payment systems of the member countries.

=== International fast payment linkage ===
Following talks with Malaysian Prime Minister Anwar Ibrahim, Indian Prime Minister Narendra Modi declared on August 20, 2024, that his country intends to link its Unified Payment Interface (UPI) with PayNet.

== Services ==
The company's current service portfolio includes the following:

- eSPICK – the national cheque clearing system of Malaysia.
- JomPAY – a payment scheme for paying utility bills
- FPX – a direct-to-bank payment gateway.
- DuitNow – instant account-to-account payment across participating banks and E-wallets.
- DuitNow QR – QR code payment scheme, a contactless payment method.

== See also ==
- National Payments Corporation of India
- MAS Electronic Payment System
