= Malaysian Electronic Payment System =

Interbank network system

Malaysian Electronic Payment System (MEPS)
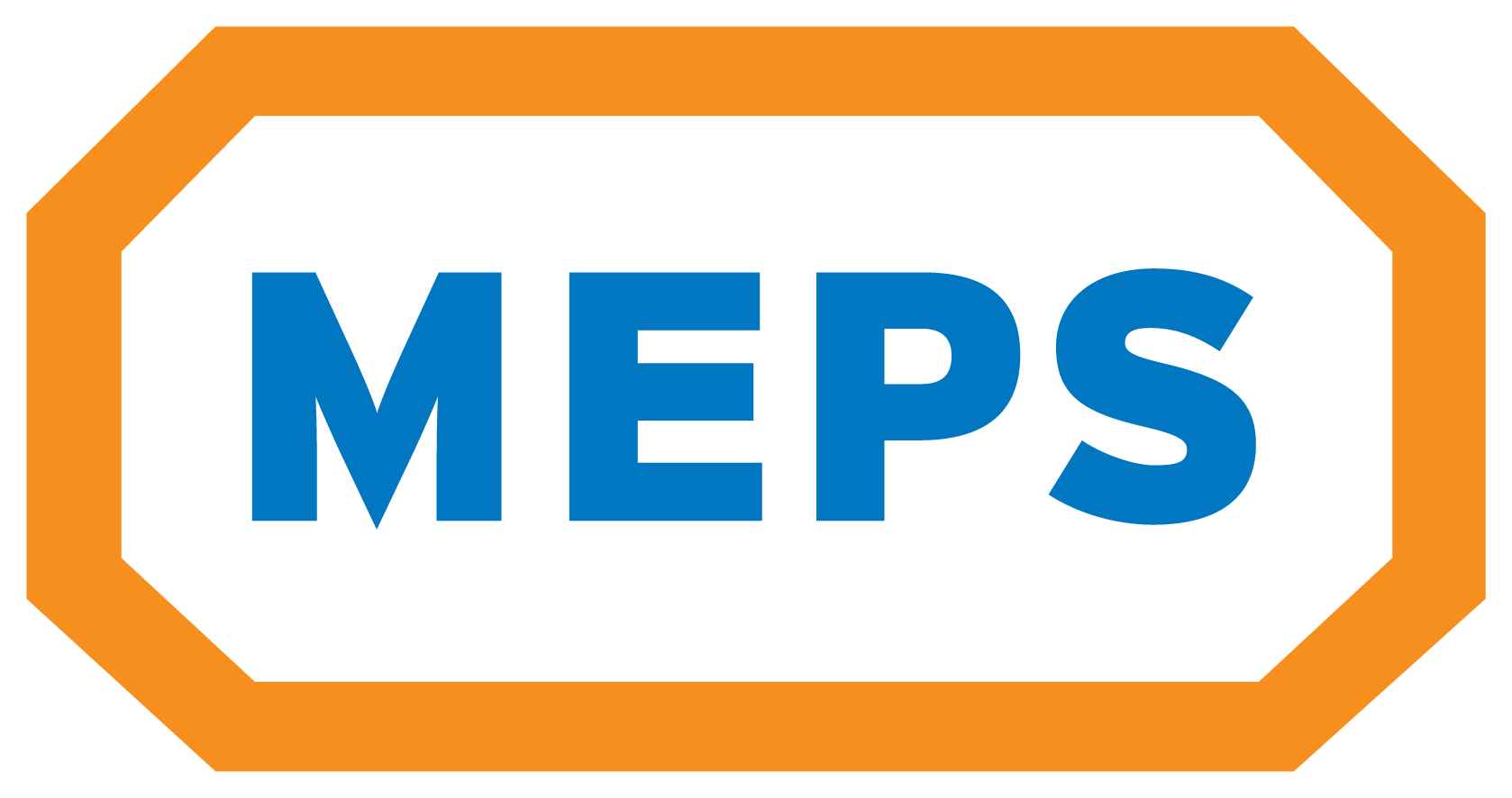
- Industry: Finance
- Founded: Early 1997
- Fate: Merged into PayNet
- Headquarters: Kuala Lumpur, Malaysia
- Key people: Datuk Ahmad Hizzad bin Baharuddin (Chairman); Peter Schiesser (Group CEO)
- Products: Financial services
- Website: www.meps.com.my (defunct) www.mepsatm.com.my

The Malaysian Electronic Payment System (MEPS) is an interbank network service provider in Malaysia. In August 2017, MEPS merged with Malaysian Electronic Clearing Corporation Sdn Bhd (MyClear) to form Payments Network Malaysia Sdn Bhd (PayNet).

With the result of the merger, PayNet is now the holding company for the PayNet Group which comprises two main subsidiaries, namely Malaysian Electronic Payment System Sdn Bhd (MEPS) and MEPS Currency Management Sdn Bhd (MCM). The PayNet Group is Malaysia's premier payments network and central infrastructure for financial markets.

MEPS plays an integral role in the implementation of smart cards for automated teller machine (ATM) cards, which are an upgrade to chip-based cards from previous magnetic-stripe cards issued to all banks' customers.

The card is called a Bankcard, a card with multiple functions. Three main functions can be used, namely ATM (with various combinations of banking transactions), e-debit (online purchase payment) transactions at participating merchants and MEPS Cash (a stored-value card that can be used to pay at participating merchants).

MEPS is a member of the Asian Payment Network (APN).

== Role ==
In brief, MEPS’ role encompasses:

- Development and implementation of payment services
- Provision and management of shared infrastructure for participating financial institutions
- Operating e-payment clearing and settlement systems for the financial industry
- Governing adherence to relevant standards
- Developing technical standards and specifications for the Smart Card
- Certification services for payment smart card and personalization centers

MEPS provides the following services through its network to all participating banks:

- Nationwide Shared ATM Network – An interbank switching infrastructure network for routine banking transactions including cash withdrawal, funds transfer, credit card and loan repayment, account balance inquiry, mobile prepaid top-up, MEPS CASH loading, and Touch n’ Go top-up
- Cross-Border Initiative – A cross-border ATM network and link with six countries; providing inter-country cash withdrawal services and will be expanded to include inter-country funds transfer and balance enquiry
- Regional Switching for Financial Institutions – Provision of ATM switching services for member banks amongst their regional branches
- MEPS ATM – Deployment of white-label ATMs owned and managed by MEPS. The ATMs offer services ranging from domestic and cross-border cash withdrawal, domestic balance inquiry, and funds transfer. Cardholders of participating banks in Malaysia have access to these ATMs while cash advance facilities for MasterCard and Visa cardholders will be enabled soon
- Payment Multi-Purpose Card Specification (PMPC) – A proprietary ATM and Debit chip-card standard that MEPS developed. MEPS is the central coordinating body for the national implementation of the PMPC and is responsible for developing the PMPC chip card specification, technical standards, technical integration, support, and coordination. MEPS is upgrading the PMPC standard to become EMV compliant and renamed as Malaysian Chip Card Specification (MCCS).

== Member banks ==
Listed below are the participating banks. However, some participating banks provide only a selected few of the services offered by MEPS as mentioned above.

- Affin Bank
- Alliance Bank Malaysia Berhad
- Al Rajhi Bank
- Agrobank
- AmBank
- Bank Islam Malaysia
- Bank Rakyat
- Bank Muamalat Malaysia
- Bank Simpanan Nasional
- CIMB Bank
- Citibank
- Hong Leong Bank
- HSBC Bank
- Kuwait Finance House
- Maybank
- MBSB Bank
- OCBC Bank
- Public Bank
- RHB Bank
- Standard Chartered Bank
- United Overseas Bank

== Awards and recognition ==
MEPS is accredited with the following:

- ISO / IEC 27001 for Information Security Management System (ISMS)
- ISO 9001: 2008 Quality Management System
- MS 1900: 2005 Quality Management Systems – Requirements from Islamic Perspectives
- Malaysian Book of Records as the First IT Company to be Certified from Islamic Perspectives
- Top Ten Favourite Brands by Superbrands Malaysia
- 2015 Cards & Electronic Payments International (CEPI) Asia Payment Awards – Best Peer-to-Peer Payments Initiative (Highly Commended)

== See also ==
- ATM usage fees
