= MEPS =

MEPS may refer to:

- Malaysian Electronic Payment System, a regional interbank network system in Malaysia
- Mañana Es Para Siempre (Tomorrow Is Forever), Mexican telenovela
- Marine Ecology Progress Series, a scientific journal dealing mostly with research in the field of marine ecology
- MAS Electronic Payment System, an interbank network in Singapore
- Medical Expenditure Panel Survey
- Microextraction by Packed Sorbent
- United States Military Entrance Processing Station
- Minimum Energy Performance Standard

== See also ==
- MEP (disambiguation) for singular, when "MEPS" is treated as the plural form
