= Bank Persatuan =

Bank of Malaysia

Co-op bank Pertama (CBP)
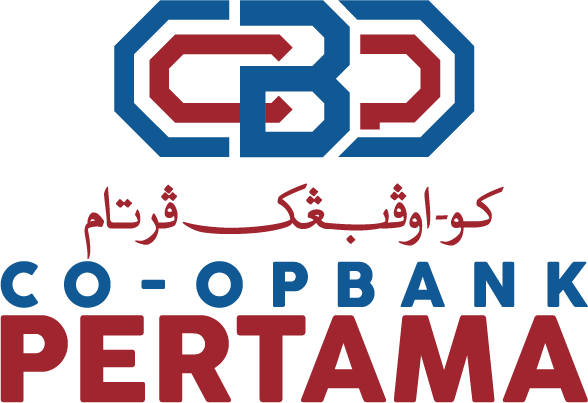
- Type: Cooperative bank
- Industry: Islamic banking and finance
- Founded: 7 June 1950
- Headquarters: Kuala Lumpur, Malaysia
- Key people: Datuk Baharom Bin Embi, Chairman; Puan Hajah Nor Hidayah Binti Omar, Vice Chairman; Khairil Anuar Bin Mohammad Anuar, CEO
- Products: Banking and finance
- Website: www.cbp.com.my

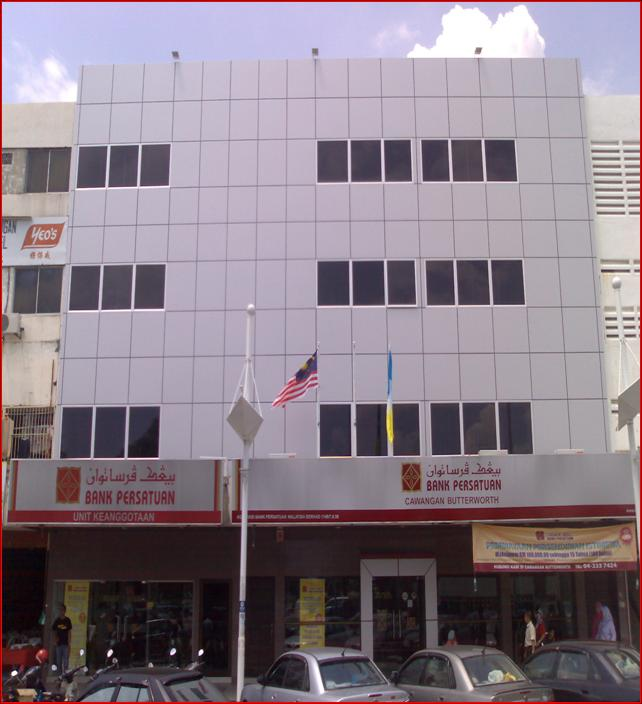
Front view of Bank Persatuan headquarters building in Taman Selat, Butterworth. Ground floor on the right is the Butterworth branch.

Koperasi Co-opbank Pertama Malaysia Berhad (Jawi:كوڤراسي كو-اوڤبڠك ڤرتام مليسيا برحد) known as Co-opbank Pertama (CBP) (Jawi:كو-اوڤبڠك ڤرتام), is a cooperative banking entity based in Penang, Malaysia, and was formerly known as Bank Persatuan. Currently, Co-opbank Pertama has over 35 branches and Ar-Rahnu outlet located mainly in the Peninsular Malaysia.

== History ==
Co-opbank Pertama (CBP) was originally established and officially registered as a cooperative company on 7 June 1950, under the Cooperative Company Ordinance (1948) which is currently known as the Cooperative Act (1993).

Its creation is the result of the merging of over 21 Village Cooperative Companies (Malay: Syarikat Kerjasama Kampung) in Bukit Mertajam, Penang. During its early establishment the newly created cooperative is known as "The Province Wellesley Cooperative Banking Union Limited".

During its establishment, CBP's office was located at the building of "Pejabat Jabatan Kemajuan Kerjasama Bukit Mertajam" whereas its staff's salary was paid by the government. Bank Persatuan activities at that time remained focused on credit financing and supplies of agricultural inputs.

The merging of cooperative banks in 1954 led to the creation of "Bank Agung" which then changed to "Bank Kerjasama" in 1967 and later was known as "Bank Rakyat" in 1972. In 1971, "Lembaga Pertubuhan Peladang" (Planters' Organization Board) was established and all agricultural-based cooperative companies under Bank Persatuan were amalgamated under "Lembaga Pertubuhan Peladang" administration. In that same year Bank Persatuan opened its membership to individual members.

In 1971, the cooperative opened its membership to both individuals and cooperatives. By 1981 its changed its name to Bank Persatuan Kerjasama Seberang Perai Berhad and only in 1995, Bank Persatuan adopted its current name when it is changed to Koperasi Bank Persatuan Malaysia Berhad or can simply be called Bank Persatuan. In September 2018, its name was changed to Co-opbank Pertama as part of its transformation & re-branding process.

== See also ==
- List of banks in Malaysia
- Islamic banking in Malaysia
