= Unsecured debt =

Obligation of repayment without a collateral

In finance, unsecured debt refers to any type of debt or general obligation that is not protected by a guarantor, or collateralized by a lien on specific assets of the borrower in the case of a bankruptcy or liquidation or failure to meet the terms for repayment. Unsecured debts are sometimes called signature debt or personal loans. These differ from secured debt such as a mortgage, which is backed by a piece of real estate.

In the event of the bankruptcy of the borrower, the unsecured creditors have a general claim on the assets of the borrower after the specific pledged assets have been assigned to the secured creditors. The unsecured creditors usually realize a smaller proportion of their claims than the secured creditors.

In some legal systems, unsecured creditors who are also indebted to the insolvent debtor are able (and, in some jurisdictions, required) to set off the debts, so actually putting the unsecured creditor with a matured liability to the debtor in a pre-preferential position.

Under risk-based pricing, creditors tend to demand extremely high interest rates as a condition of extending unsecured debt. The maximum loss on a properly collateralized loan is the difference between the fair market value of the collateral and the outstanding debt. Thus, in the context of secured lending, the use of collateral reduces the size of the "bet" taken by the creditor on the debtor's creditworthiness. Without collateral, the creditor stands to lose the entire sum outstanding at the point of default and must boost the interest rate to price in that risk. Hence, although sufficiently high interest rates are considered usurious, unsecured loans would not be made at all without them.

Unsecured loans are often sought out if additional capital is required although existing (but not necessarily all) assets have been pledged to secure prior debt. Secured lenders more often than not include language in the loan agreement that prevents debtor from assuming additional secured loans or pledging any assets to a creditor.

== Examples of unsecured debt ==
=== Types of unsecured debt ===
- Corporate unsecured debt - Since this type of debt assumes a greater amount of risk, corporations that have lower bond ratings (such as BBB) are classified as unsecured debt due to their higher default risk.
- Personal loan - A personal loan is a loan which can be taken to meet unspecified financial needs, such as a wedding, travel, or medical emergencies. The interest paid on a personal loan is in most cases higher than that payable on secured loans.
- Consumer durable loan - In the retail sector or e-commerce, a growing number of merchants have embraced point-of-sale financing. These are common for durable goods, which are more expensive than small consumer items.
- Student loans - This common type of debt is considered unsecured in many countries, because the loan is usually taken by a student (usually at graduate or undergraduate level) or the student's parent or legal guardian to pay tuition fees. The borrower is usually expected to pay back the loan after completing the course and securing a job, and because this is uncertain, lenders have very strict criteria for this product. The loan is only given after the lender assesses the student's academic record, the type of course the student is wishing to pursue and the quality of the university / institute where the student has secured admission for the aforementioned course, in addition to other standard criteria such as the guarantor's credit history, bank account statements, assets and holdings, etc. However, in rare cases, the borrower (usually a parent / legal guardian) of the student can pledge assets against the loan, thereby making it a secured loan. In recent times, many salaried professionals also take loans to complete part-time courses or certifications. In such cases however, the loan is not considered to be a student loan – it is simply categorized as a general personal loan.
- Credit card debt

== National differences ==
=== Malaysia ===
In Malaysia, there are personal loans for the private sector and for the government sector. The personal loan interest rate for the private sector is always higher than the government sector because it is of lower risk for the bank to lend to the government sector. The government will pay the salary of the civil servants through a payroll system known as the Biro Angkasa and the bank will deduct the monthly installment of the loan from the civil servant's salary through this system, before the salary is even released. An example of these loans are cooperative loans.

Interest rates for personal loans in Malaysia are influenced by either one of these factors: loan amount, loan tenure and income of the applicant. In some cases, the bank will take 2 or even 3 of these factors to decide on the appropriate interest rate to be applied to the personal loan. In 2013, the Malaysian Central Bank introduces a new maximum loan tenure of 10 years for personal loan (previous maximum loan tenure was 25 years).

=== New Zealand ===
In New Zealand, unsecured debt is primarily governed by the Credit Contracts and Consumer Finance Act 2003 (CCCFA), which requires lenders to act responsibly and clearly disclose all loan terms. Because unsecured debts are not backed by collateral, lenders typically assess creditworthiness using credit reporting information, including repayment history and defaults.

If a borrower defaults and does not repay voluntarily, a creditor will commonly need a court judgment or enforceable tribunal order before using New Zealand court enforcement processes. Once enforcement is available, options may include attachment orders (deductions from wages or benefits) or warrants to seize property.

Under the Limitation Act 2010, most unsecured debts become statute-barred after six years. If no legal action is taken and the debt is not acknowledged or repaid within that period, it generally becomes unenforceable in court.

=== Singapore ===
In Singapore, unsecured credit, including credit card debt and personal loans, can carry high interest rates due to the lack of collateral. To safeguard borrowers from excessive debt accumulation, the Monetary Authority of Singapore (MAS) has implemented measures effective since January 1, 2018. These rules cap additional unsecured credit for borrowers whose outstanding debts exceed six times their monthly income, with a total credit limit not exceeding 12 times their monthly income.

The borrowing limit, set industry-wide, aims to prevent long-term reliance on unsecured credit and reduce debt accumulation. Banks must conduct credit bureau checks before granting new credit facilities or credit limit increases, ensuring loans align with borrowers' ability to repay. To manage debt effectively, borrowers can explore debt repayment plans and debt consolidation options. Understanding the rules and regulations can help borrowers maintain financial stability and make informed borrowing decisions in Singapore.

=== United Kingdom ===
Unsecured loans in the UK are a form of credit that doesn't require collateral, such as property or other assets, to back the loan. This makes them a popular choice for borrowers who may not have assets to secure against a loan or prefer not to risk their assets. Unsecured loans are primarily based on the borrower's creditworthiness, with lenders evaluating credit history, income, and financial stability to determine eligibility. Interest rates for these loans can vary widely depending on the lender and the borrower's credit score. While unsecured loans offer the convenience of borrowing without collateral, they typically come with higher interest rates compared to secured loans, reflecting the increased risk for the lender. They are commonly used for various purposes, including debt consolidation, home improvements, or covering unexpected expenses. It's important for borrowers to carefully consider their ability to repay an unsecured loan, as failure to do so can significantly impact their credit score and financial health.

=== United States ===
Failure to make a payment on an unsecured debt may ultimately result in reporting the delinquent debt to a credit reporting agency or legal action. However, a nongovernmental unsecured creditor cannot seize any of your assets without a court judgment in the U.S.

A creditor must file a complaint in state or federal court before a judgment can be made for or against the borrower.

== See also ==
- High-yield debt
- Unsecured guarantor loan
- Medical debt
- Merchant cash advance
- Peer-to-peer lending
- Time deposit
- Credit card debt
