= Islamic banking in Kazakhstan =

Financial instruments

Islamic banking in Kazakhstan was started in 2007 when the Kazakh regulator promulgated the announcement to issue Islamic securities called sukuk (interest-free bonds) in the local currency (tenge). These developments were part of the Kazakh government's development plans to be financed by Islamic financial instruments.

In cooperation with the Islamic Development Bank (IDB), Kazakhstan became the second country (after Malaysia) to introduce IDB-issued Sharia-compliant securities denominated in national currency.

In 2009 Kazakhstan became the first CIS country to pass legislation about Islamic finance. After this international and local institutions began operating in Almaty and Astana.

The legislation prohibits Islamic banks from profiting from unIslamic business ventures like pornography and charging interest. Under the Kazakh rules each bank must have an independent "Council on the principles of Islamic finance" to issue decisions on the policies and bank transactions. Deposit insurance is not available for Islamic banks.
