= Citibank Tower =

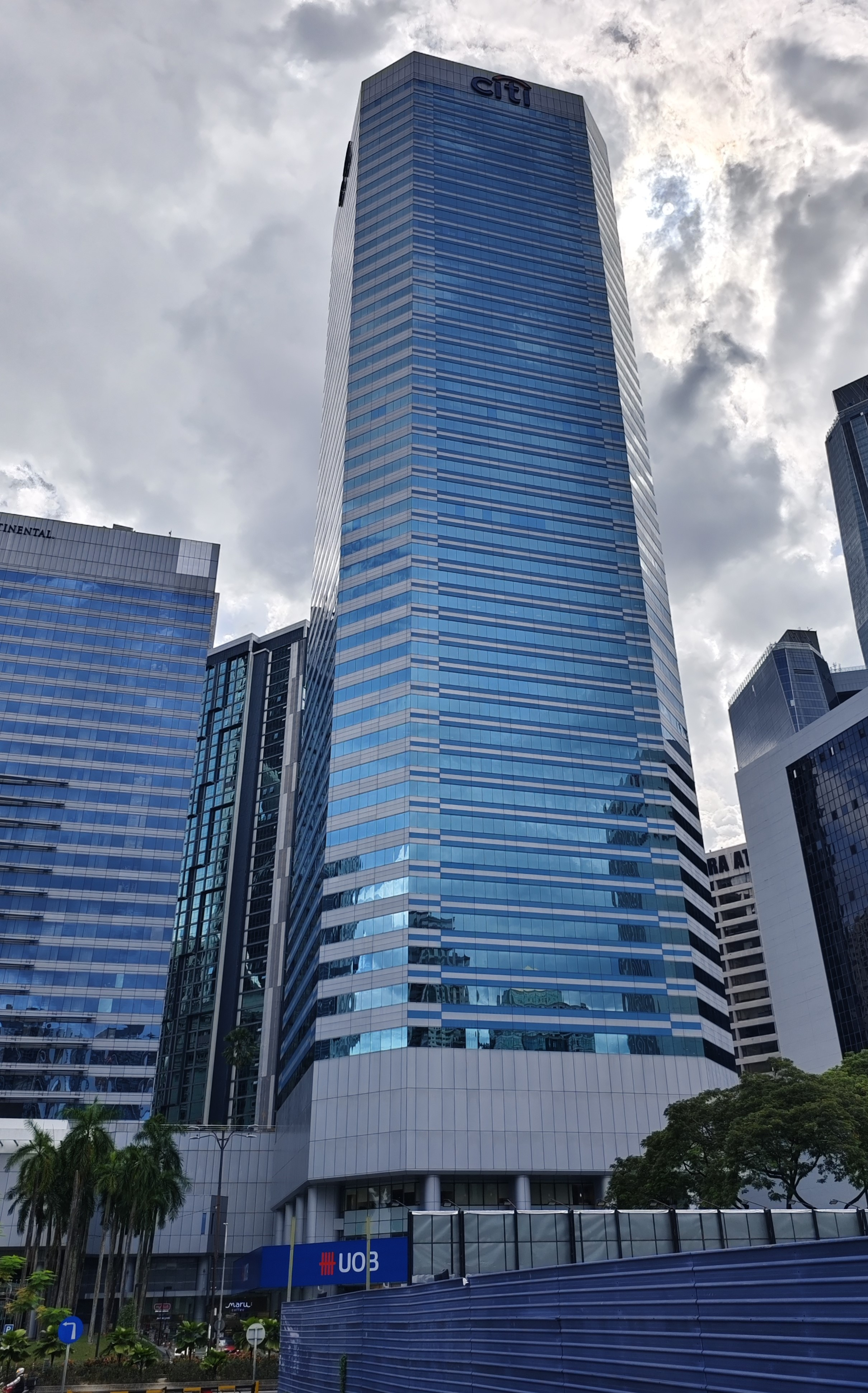
- Interactive map of the Citibank Tower area
- Alternative names: Menara Lion; Citibank Tower

General information
- Type: Commercial offices
- Location: Kuala Lumpur, Malaysia
- Coordinates: 3.16°N 101.7172°E
- Completed: 1995
- Owner: Inverfin Sdn Bhd

Height
- Roof: 190.2 m (624 ft)

Technical details
- Floor count: 50
- Floor area: 68,156 sq ft (6,331.9 m^{2})

Design and construction
- Architect: Hijjas Kasturi Associates

Citibank Tower (Malay: Menara Citibank), is a 50-storey Class A commercial tower located close to the Petronas Towers and houses the headquarters of Citibank Syariah. The building was developed by The Lion Group and completed in 1995, and was originally named Menara Lion or Lion Tower until Citibank acquired a 50% stake and moved into the building in 2000.

The building is owned by Inverfin Sdn Bhd, which is in turn, equally owned by Hap Seng Consolidated Bhd and Menara Citi Holding Co. Hap Seng Consolidated obtained its 50% stake in Inverfin in August 2009 from CapitaLand (30%) and Amsteel Corp Bhd (20%) (a Lion Group subsidiary), following IOI Group’s decision not to proceed with the acquisition of the same which it had bid for a year earlier. In May 2010, Hap Seng Consolidated indicated its interest to acquire the remaining 50% stake in building sometime in the future.

Citibank Tower has a basement parking facility for its employees and visitors.

== See also ==
- List of tallest buildings in Kuala Lumpur
