= AIA Public =

Malaysian takaful company

AIA PUBLIC Takaful Bhd.
- Type: Private limited company
- Industry: Takaful
- Founded: 2011; 15 years ago (as ING Public Takaful Ehsan Berhad)
- Headquarters: Menara AIA; 99 Jalan Ampang, Kuala Lumpur, Malaysia
- Key people: Thomas Mun (Chairman); Elmie Aman Najas (CEO)
- Products: Family takaful
- Revenue: ▲RM215 million (2014)
- Net income: ▼ -RM8 million (2014)
- Total assets: ▲RM432 million (2014)
- Total equity: ▼RM71 million (2014)
- Parent: AIA Group Limited (70%); Public Bank Berhad (30%)
- Website: www.aiapublic.com.my

AIA PUBLIC Takaful Bhd. is a Malaysian takaful company, jointly owned by AIA Group Limited and Public Bank Berhad.

The company is the successor to two former takaful operators—ING Public Takaful Ehsan and AIA AFG Takaful. ING Public was the takaful joint venture between ING Group and Public Bank until 2012, when AIA acquired ING's Malaysian operations. AIA AFG was the takaful joint venture between AIA and Alliance Financial Group (AFG). Subsequent to AIA's acquisition of ING's stake in ING Public (renamed AIA PUBLIC), AFG disposed of its interest in AIA AFG. AIA AFG was then merged into AIA Public, with the transfer of business completed in 2014. The series of transactions resulted in AIA Group and Public Bank holding 70 and 30 percent interests respectively in the company.

AIA PUBLIC distributes family takaful products via AIA Malaysia's 17,000 insurance agents (known as life planners) (as of 2015) and Public Bank's over 250 branches in Malaysia.

The company made its first surplus distribution in 2014.
