= EON Bank =

EON Bank Berhad
- Company type: Public
- Industry: Banking and Finance
- Defunct: 1 July 2011
- Successor: Hong Leong Bank
- Headquarters: Kuala Lumpur, Malaysia
- Area served: Personal banking services in: Malaysia
- Products: Banking and Finance Services

EON Bank Berhad was a company listed on the Main Board of Bursa Malaysia (formerly known as the Kuala Lumpur Stock Exchange or Oriental Bank) on 23 December 2002. It is the holding company of EON Bank Group. It is now part of Hong Leong Bank Group.

EON Bank Berhad is a licensed banking and finance company operating under the regulations of Bank Negara Malaysia under the provisions of the Banking and Financial Institutions Act, 1989. EON Bank is principally engaged in the provision of a comprehensive range of both conventional and Islamic banking services and products.
