= Al Rajhi Bank Malaysia =

Malaysian bank

- Industry: Financial services
- Headquarters: Kuala Lumpur, Malaysia
- Services: Banking
- Owner: Al-Rajhi Bank
- Website: http://www.alrajhibank.com.my/

Al Rajhi Bank Malaysia is a bank based in Malaysia. Its head office is located at Kuala Lumpur, Malaysia.

== See also ==
- Al-Rajhi Bank
- List of banks
- List of banks in Malaysia
