= Cooperative loans in Malaysia =

Malaysian credit services

Cooperative loans in Malaysia, commonly known in the Malay language as Pinjaman Koperasi, are credit services offered by cooperatives registered under the Cooperative Commission of Malaysia (SKM) to their members who work as civil servants. Cooperative loans are part of the shadow banking system in Malaysia. The borrowers are restricted to employees in government departments, statutory bodies, government-linked companies, or municipal councils. The Congress of Unions of Employees in the Public and Civil Services (CUEPACS) supports these loans because they aid civil servants in overcoming financial problems and reducing borrowing from loan sharks. All matters relating to the administration of these loans are regulated under the Cooperative Society Act of 1993.

== Loan features ==
Cooperative loans in Malaysia share some common features such as:

=== Repayment by salary deduction ===
Payment of monthly installment is via an automatic salary deduction by a government-related body called the National Cooperative Movement of Malaysia (ANGKASA). Loan size is limited to RM250,000 (maximum allowed) or to the maximum installment amount that can be deducted from the borrower's salary. Loan installments, together with other deductions, cannot exceed the maximum 60% limit on salary deductions imposed by the Public Services Department. This is to ensure that the take-home pay is at least 40% of gross salary. The maximum tenure is 10 years (the maximum tenure allowable by Bank Negara Malaysia) or until retirement year, whichever comes first.

=== Sharia compliance ===
The vast majority of personal loans offered by the cooperatives are Islamic loans that comply with the Sharia guidelines set by SKM. These loans are based on Islamic banking and finance principles, such as Tawarruq and Murabahah, which involve the buying and selling of commodity payable by installment or deferred payment. Using the buying-selling model, interest (riba) which is forbidden (haram), is replaced by a profit margin agreed upon between the buyer and the seller. Most cooperative loans come with compulsory takaful insurance protection that covers the outstanding amount in circumstances of death or total permanent disability.

=== Dependence on borrowed funds ===
Cooperatives provide credit facilities to their members by using either their own or borrowed funds. Since cooperatives funds are limited, the operations of these loans are primarily dependent on consistent and constant funding from financial institutions. Popular commercial banks in Malaysia such as Maybank, RHB Bank, Kuwait Finance House and Bank Rakyat are currently funding or have in the past contributed funds to the cooperatives.

=== Approval rate ===
The approval rate of cooperative loans is very high, as credit score is irrelevant since monthly installment repayment is automatic. Applicants who have been blacklisted by banks due to poor credit score as reflected by Central Credit Reference Information System (CCRIS) and the Credit Tip-Off System (CTOS) successfully apply for cooperative loans.

== Controversies ==
These plans have many critics, one of the most vocal being the Consumer Association of Penang. Among the criticism directed at the cooperatives is that cooperative loans encourage over-borrowing and burden the borrowers with long-term debts.

=== Long-term debt burden ===
In the past, cooperative loan schemes have had very long tenure, up to a maximum of 25 years. A loan stretched over a long tenure allows the borrower to pay lower monthly installment and hence be eligible for a higher loan amount. The maximum loan amount is RM250,000. In June 2013, in an effort to rein in rising household debt, Bank Negara restricted all personal loan borrowings to a maximum of 10 years. This ruling effectively reduced borrowings under the cooperative schemes and led to protests by the cooperatives. The Congress of Union of Employees in the Public And Civil Services (CUEPACS) also opposed the Central Bank's new ruling and suggested a compromised solution of 15 years tenure. According to them, many government employees will borrow from loan sharks if they are unable to secure cooperative loans. Despite much opposition, the 10-year loan tenure cap is still in place today.

=== Illegal schemes ===
Some cooperatives are found to be operating illegal loan schemes and charging exorbitant interest. In August 2016, the Ministry of Domestic Trade, Co-operatives and Consumerism (Malaysia) (KPDNKK) ordered the closure of 12 cooperatives found operating loan schemes with the involvement of loan sharks. The minister of KPDNKK, Datuk Hamzah, announced that the government was working on improving the Cooperative Act of 1993 to better regulate the activities of nearly 13,000 registered cooperatives throughout the country.

=== High effective interest rates ===
Another criticism revolves around the actual cost of the loan. Prior to 2012, the typical interest rate of most cooperative loan was around 10% per annum calculated on a flat rate. Borrowers only received 81% of the loan amount with 19% deducted for various fees and expenses including a commission to agents. A recalculation of interest rates based on effective rates on the actual money received showed that borrowers were paying interest of 24% per annum.

== Cooperative loans today ==
Increased competition among cooperatives offering loans resulted in interest rate steadily declining. Most cooperative loans today charge an interest of 4–7% per annum with payout usually around 90–95%, which makes the cost of cooperative loans similar to bank loans. Cooperative loans are meant to be a more viable option for civil servants with poor credit score. Cooperative loans compared to license money lenders who charge 18% per annum (maximum allowable interest rate as stipulated by the Money Lending Act 1951).
