= Citibank (Malaysia) =

Bank in Malaysia

Citibank Berhad

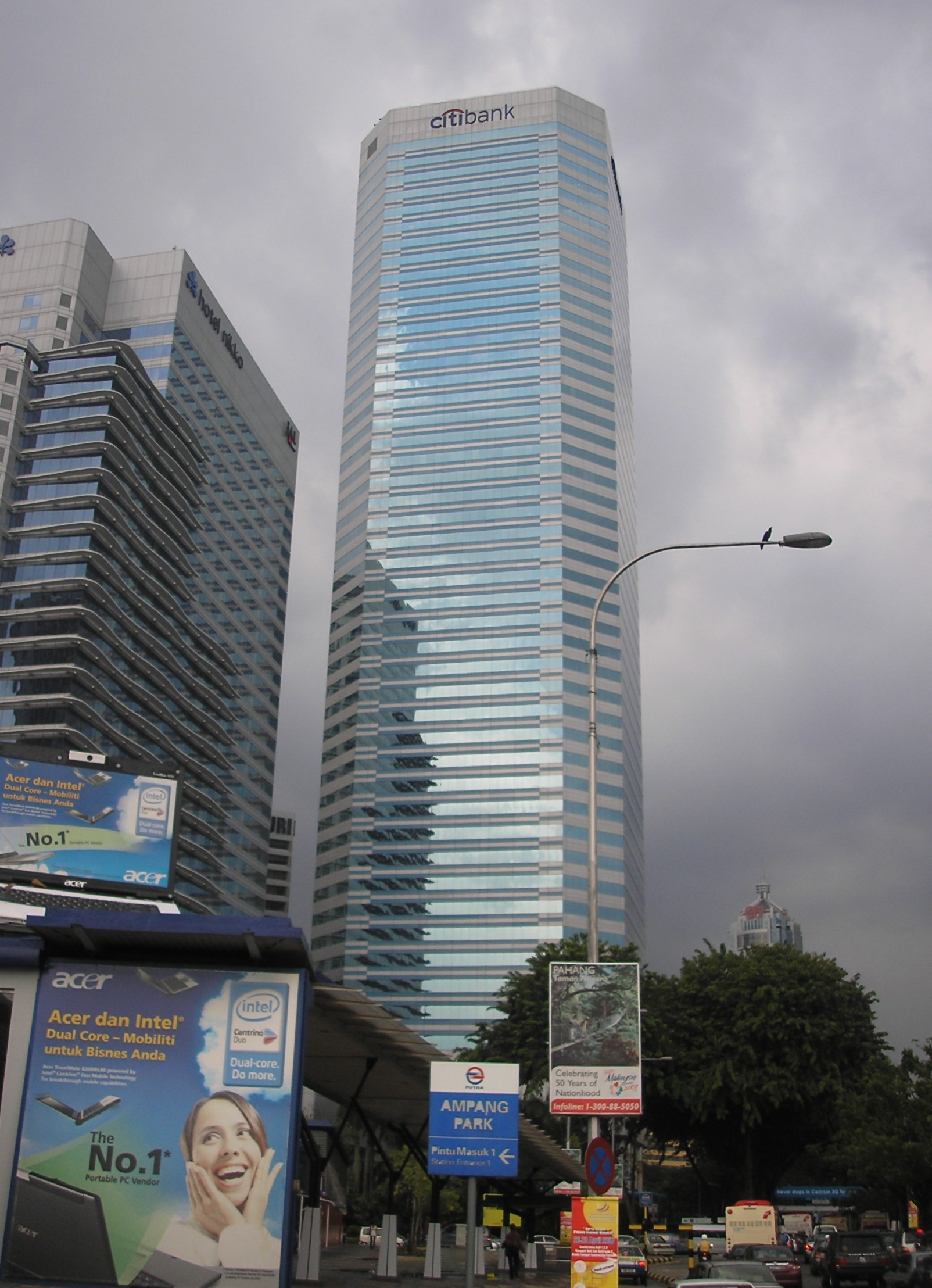
- Citibank Tower, Kuala Lumpur, Malaysia
- Company type: Berhad, Licensed Banking Institution.
- Industry: Banking, Financial services
- Founded: Present since July 1959; 67 years ago Incorporation in 1994; 32 years ago
- Headquarters: Past – Medan Pasar; Kuala Lumpur, Current - Menara Citibank, Jalan Ampang, Kuala Lumpur
- Key people: Vikram Singh (Chief Executive Officer), Ms. Tang Wan Chee (Company Secretary), Ms. Terri Tan Seat Mooi (Company Secretary)
- Products: Financial services
- Number of employees: 4,000
- Parent: Citigroup Holdings (Singapore) Ptd. Ltd.
- Subsidiaries: Citigroup Global Markets Malaysia Sdn BerhadBhd; Citibank Malaysia (L) Limited; Menara Citi Holding Company Sdn Bhderhad (a subsidiary of Citicorp Overseas Investment Corp); Inverfin Sdn Bhd Citicorp Trade Services (Malaysia) Sdn Bhd; Citigroup Transaction Services (M) Sdn Bhd

Citibank Berhad is a licensed commercial bank operating in Malaysia headquartered in Jalan Ampang, Kuala Lumpur. It operates as a subsidiary of Citigroup Holding (Singapore) Private Limited and began its banking operations in Malaysia in 1959. The bank was locally incorporated in 1994. Citibank Berhad has 11 branches across Kuala Lumpur, Selangor, Penang, Kuantan, Malacca and Johor.

== History ==
Formerly known as First National City Bank, Citibank opened its first Malaysian branch in Jalan Medan Pasar, Kuala Lumpur with 17 employees in July 1959. Two more branches opened in 1965, another one in Kuala Lumpur and one in Penang.

Citibank Berhad locally incorporated on April 22, 1994 making it the first American Bank to do so.

Consumer and corporate banking operations were brought under one roof at the new headquarters, Citibank Menara, on June 11, 2001.

In 2006, following the lifting of restrictions on foreign banks, Citibank opened branches throughout Malaysia in Bukit Tengah (Penang), Damansara Perdana (Petaling Jaya), Klang, and Puchong (Selangor). In 2009, Citibank opened another four branches in Taipan USJ, Cheras, Melaka, and Kuantan, expanding its branch network to eleven.

On November 1, 2022, Citigroup completed the transfer of Citi Malaysia's retail banking and consumer credit card businesses to UOB Malaysia.
