= Islamic banking in Malaysia =

Banking in Malaysia

Logo displayed by all institutions providing Islamic banking in Malaysia

Islamic banking in Malaysia began in September 1963 when Perbadanan Wang Simpanan Bakal-Bakal Haji (PWSBH) was established. PWSBH was set up as an institution for Muslims to save for their Hajj (pilgrimage to Mecca) expenses. In 1969, PWSBH merged with Pejabat Urusan Haji to form Lembaga Urusan dan Tabung Haji (now known as Lembaga Tabung Haji).

The first Islamic bank in Malaysia was established in 1983. In 1993, commercial banks, merchant banks and finance companies were allowed to offer Islamic banking products and services under the Islamic Banking Scheme (IBS). These institutions however, are required to separate the funds and activities of Islamic banking transactions from that of the conventional banking business to ensure that there would not be any co-mingling of funds.

The list of banks in Malaysia offering Islamic products (updated in 2015) have grown to 16 banks. Apart from banks, other non-banks intermediaries offering syariah based products are Malaysia Building Society Berhad (MBSB) and cooperatives registered under the Cooperative Commission of Malaysia (SKM).

In Malaysia, the National Shariah Advisory Council additionally set up at Bank Negara Malaysia (BNM) advises BNM on the Shariah aspects of the operations of these institutions, as well as on their products and services. In 2006, Bank Negara Malaysia setup International Centre for Education in Islamic Finance (INCEIF) a dedicated University to provide skilled and certified personnel for Islamic Finance in Malaysia. The university was established as part of the Malaysian Government's initiative to further strengthen the country's position as an international Islamic finance centre. It is the only university in the world that is wholly dedicated to postgraduate study in Islamic Finance.

In June 2005, Dow Jones and Company of New York City and RHB Securities of Kuala Lumpur, teamed up to launch a new "Islamic Malaysia Index" — a collection of 45 stocks representing Malaysian companies that comply with a variety of Sharia-based criteria. Three variables (the total debt of an indexed company, its total cash plus interest-bearing securities and its accounts receivables) must each be less than 33% of the trailing 12-month average capitalization, for example.

== See also ==
- Economy of the OIC
- Shariah investments
- Cooperative loans in Malaysia
