= MAS Electronic Payment System =

Fund transfer system

The MAS Electronic Payment System, or MEPS in short, is an SGD-only online interbank payment and fund transfer system in Singapore. It went online in July 1998, and is owned and operated by the Monetary Authority of Singapore (MAS). The irrevocable transfer of funds and the real-time nature of transfers are some of the key features of MEPS.

As of 9 December 2006, the system was upgraded to MEPS+, which includes improved features such as the use of SWIFT message formats and network and automated gridlock detection and resolution.

== See also ==
- Banking in Singapore
