= Agrobank =

Malaysian bank

Bank Pertanian Malaysia Berhad

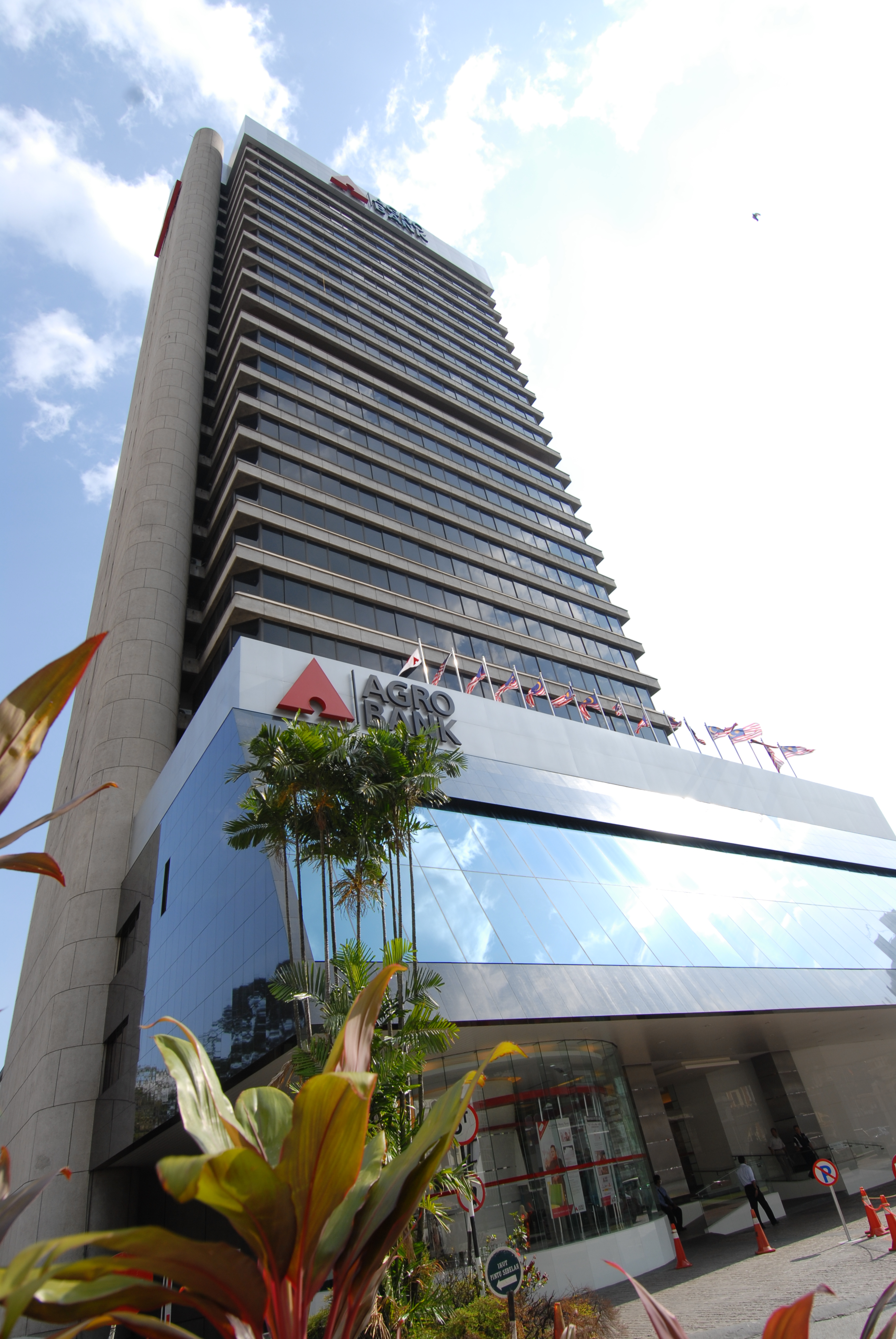
- Agrobank headquarters in Kuala Lumpur, 2010
- Company type: State-owned enterprise
- Industry: Banking, financial services
- Founded: 1969
- Founder: Government of Malaysia
- Headquarters: Leboh Pasar Besar, Peti Surat 10815, 50726 Kuala Lumpur, Malaysia
- Number of locations: 184 branches across Malaysia as of April 2018
- Products: Banking and Finance
- Parent: Minister of Finance Incorporated
- Website: www.agrobank.com.my

Bank Pertanian Malaysia Berhad, d.b.a. Agrobank is a Malaysian government-owned bank under the purview of the Minister of Finance Incorporated, established in 1969 with focus on agriculture sector. The Bank's financing of the agricultural sector is driven by a policy set forth by the Ministry of Agriculture and Food Industries (MAFI).

As a DFI (Development Financial Institution) that focus on strengthening the agriculture sector in Malaysia, Agrobank aims to balance its developmental and commercial roles to benefit the agriculture sector. Agrobank provides a comprehensive financing solution for agriculture; that includes upstream activities such as the supply of agricultural production inputs to downstream activities such as processing and selling of agricultural products to consumers.

It operates via 184 branches; offering products and services in the areas of corporate, commercial and micro financing as well as trade finance, personal financing, electronic banking and deposit & services.

== History ==
The Bank Pertanian building was completed in September 1978.

On 1 July 2015, Agrobank became a full-fledged Islamic bank.
