= Bank Muamalat Malaysia =

Islamic bank of Malaysia

Bank Muamalat Malaysia Berhad
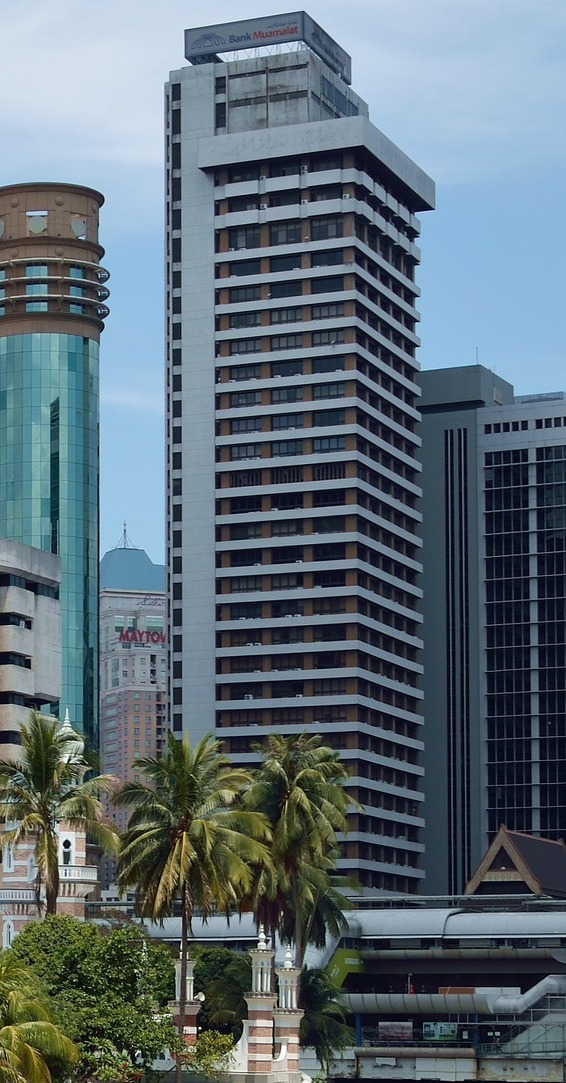
- Bank Muamalat Tower, the headquarters of the bank seen from opposite side of the Klang River.
- Native name: بڠك معاملة مليسيا
- Company type: Subsidiary
- Industry: Finance
- Founded: October 1, 1999; 26 years ago
- Headquarters: Kuala Lumpur, Malaysia
- Key people: Khairul Kamarudin (CEO); Tan Sri Tajuddin Atan (chairman)
- Products: Financial services
- Website: www.muamalat.com.my

Bank Muamalat Malaysia Berhad (Jawi: بڠك معاملة مليسيا) started its operations on 1 October 1999 with a combined assets and liabilities brought over from the Islamic banking windows of the then Bank Bumiputra Malaysia Berhad, Bank of Commerce (M) Berhad and BBMB Kewangan.

Bank Muamalat Malaysia Berhad, the second full-fledged Islamic bank to be established in Malaysia after Bank Islam Malaysia Berhad, is poised to play its role in providing Islamic banking products and services to Malaysians, without regard to race or religious beliefs. The bank was based on a profit sharing model and its products weren't linked to the Bank Indonesia discount rate, thus surviving to the 1997 Asian financial crisis which increased the mean interest rate of the other Indonesian banks.

DRB-HICOM holds 70% shares in the Bank while Khazanah Nasional Berhad holds the remaining shares.

== See also ==
- List of banks in Malaysia
