= Alliance Bank Malaysia =

Bank

Alliance Bank Malaysia Berhad

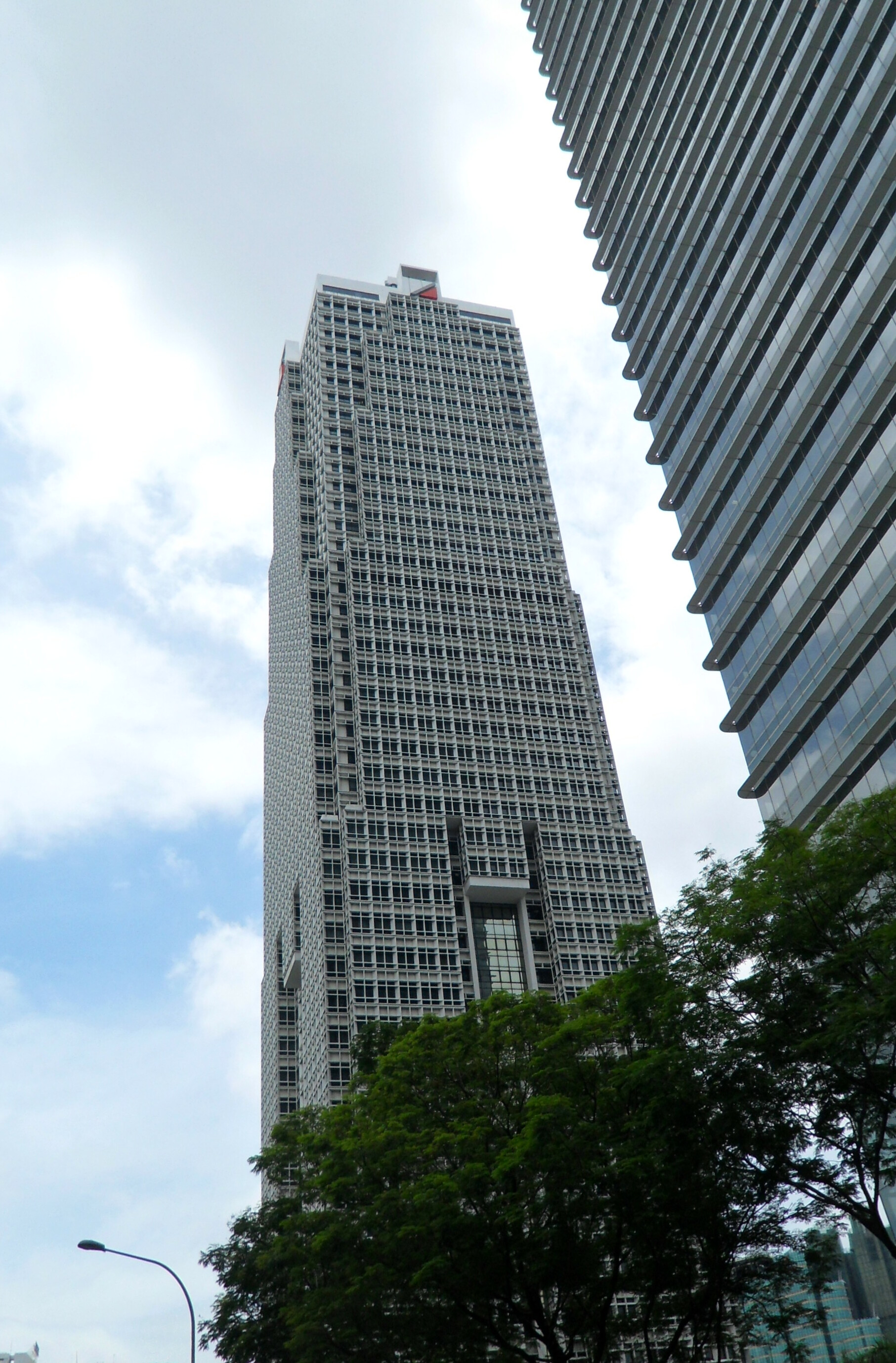
- Alliance Bank's headquarters in Kuala Lumpur, Malaysia
- Type: Public limited company
- Traded as: MYX: 2488
- ISIN: MYL2488OO004
- Industry: Banking & Financial Services
- Founded: 1982
- Headquarters: Menara Multi-Purpose, Capital Square 8, Jalan Munshi Abdullah, 50100 Kuala Lumpur, Malaysia
- Key people: Kellee Kam (Group Chief Executive Officer); Tan Sri Dato’ Ahmad Bin Mohd Don (Chairman)
- Services: Banking & Financial Services
- Subsidiaries: Alliance Islamic Bank Berhad; Alliance Direct Marketing Sdn. Bhd.; AllianceGroup Nominees (Tempatan) Sdn. Bhd.; Alliance Group Nominees (Asing) Sdn. Bhd.; Alliance DBS Research Sdn Bhd. (JV); Alliance Investment Bank Berhad (under members' voluntary winding up); Alliance Investment Bank Berhad (under members' voluntary winding up); Alliance Financial Group Berhad (under members' voluntary winding up)
- Website: alliancebank.com.my

Alliance Bank Malaysia Berhad, often known as Alliance Bank, is a publicly traded banking and financial institution in Malaysia.

== See also ==
- List of banks
- List of banks in Malaysia
