= Bank Islam Malaysia =

Malaysian Islamic bank

Bank Islam Malaysia Berhad
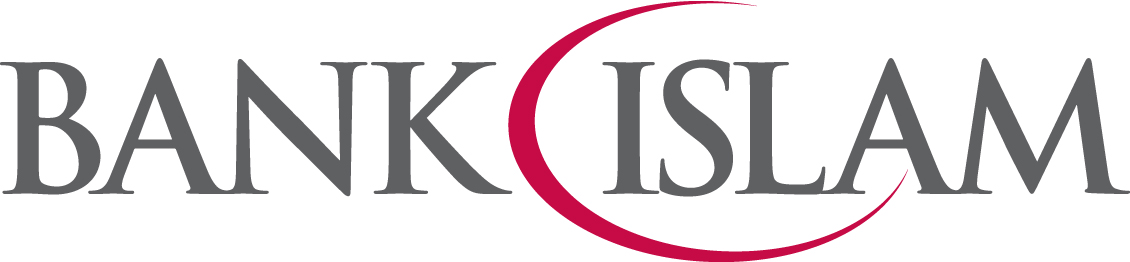
- Current Bank Islam logo since 2005
- Native name: بڠك اسلام مليسيا برحد
- Company type: Public limited company
- Industry: Islamic banking and finance
- Founded: 1 July 1983; 42 years ago
- Headquarters: Level 32, Menara Bank Islam, No. 22, Jalan Perak, 50450 Kuala Lumpur, Malaysia
- Key people: Ismail Bakar, Chairman; Mohd Muazzam Mohamed, Chief Executive Officer; Ir. Dr. Muhamad Fuad Abdullah, Chairman Shariah Supervisory Council
- Parent: BIMB Holdings
- Website: www.bankislam.com

Bank Islam Malaysia Berhad (Jawi: بڠك اسلام مليسيا برحد) is an Islamic bank based in Malaysia. It was established in July 1983. Bank Islam was established primarily to address the financial needs of the country's Muslim population and extended its services to the broader population.

== See also ==
- Bank Syariah Indonesia
- Dubai Islamic Bank
- Al-Rajhi Bank
