= Hong Leong Bank =

Malaysian Banking Company

Hong Leong Bank Berhad

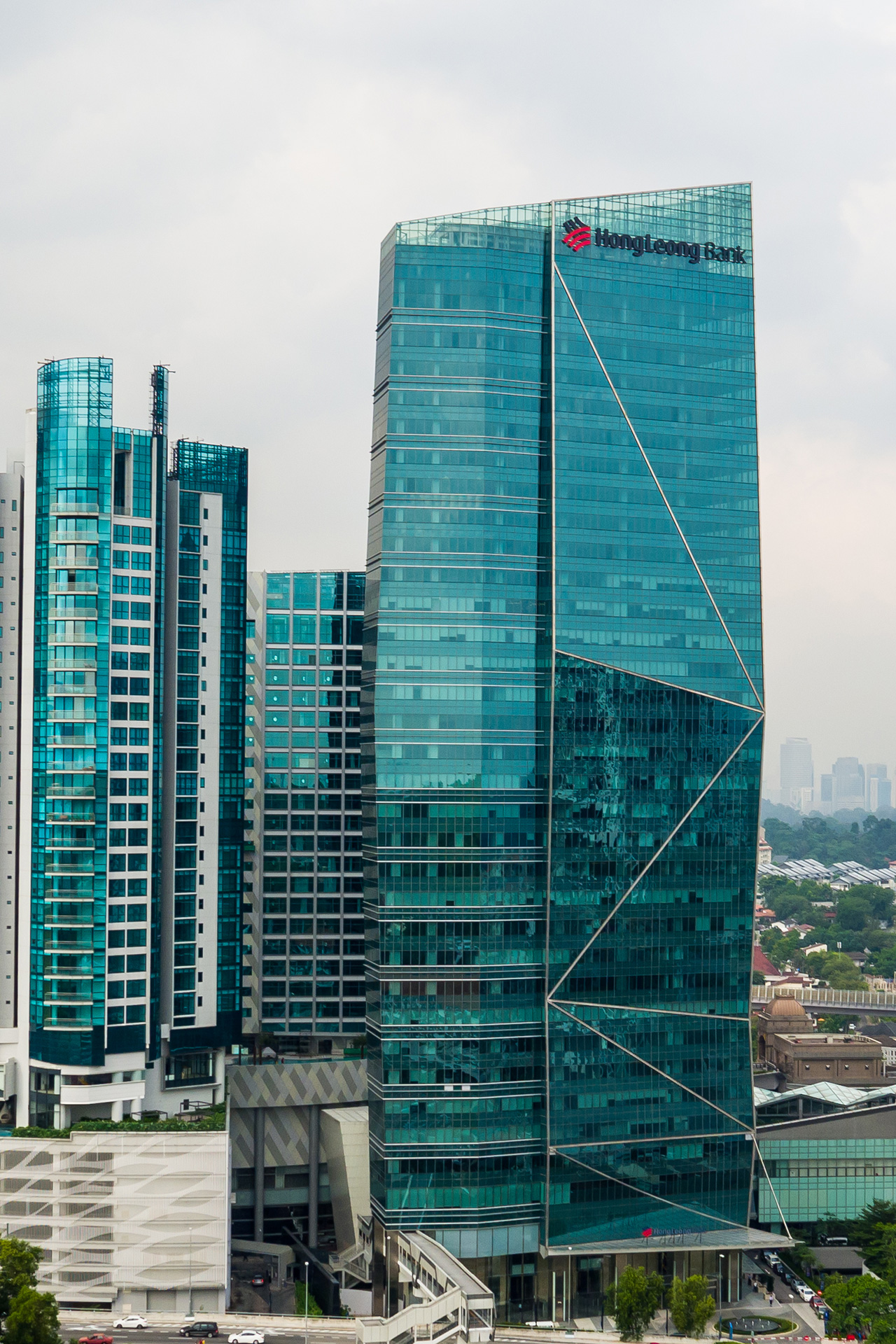
- Menara Hong Leong, the bank's headquarters
- Type: Public limited company
- Traded as: MYX: 5819
- ISIN: MYL5819OO007
- Industry: Banking
- Founded: 1905 (then called Kwang Lee Mortgage & Remittance company)
- Founders: Lam Tee Chew (林子昭) and Lam Song Khee (林崧祺)
- Headquarters: Menara Hong Leong, 6, Jalan Damanlela, Bukit Damansara, 50490, Kuala Lumpur, Malaysia
- Number of locations: 226 branches
- Area served: Malaysia; Singapore; Hong Kong; Mainland China; Vietnam; Cambodia; United States; Australia
- Key people: Kevin Lam Sai Yoke (CEO); Quek Leng Chan (Chairman)
- Products: Financial services
- Services: Retail banking, corporate banking, investment banking, mortgage loans, private banking, wealth management, credit cards
- Revenue: ▲RM6.051 billion (Fiscal Year Ended 30 June 2020)
- Operating income: ▼RM2.075 billion (Fiscal Year Ended 30 June 2020)
- Net income: ▼RM1.654 billion (Fiscal Year Ended 30 June 2020)
- Total assets: ▲RM177.707 billion (Fiscal Year Ended 30 June 2020)
- Total equity: ▼RM20.985 billion (Fiscal Year Ended 30 June 2020)
- Owner: Hong Leong Financial Group (64.23%); Employees Provident Fund (10.35%)
- Parent: Hong Leong Financial Group
- Subsidiaries: Hong Leong Islamic Bank; Bank of Chengdu; HLB Vietnam; HLB Cambodia
- Rating: Moody's: A3; Fitch Ratings: BBB+
- Website: www.hlb.com.my

Hong Leong Bank Berhad (Chinese: 豐隆銀行; MYX: 5819; stylized as HongLeong Bank) is a major public listed banking group in Malaysia.

== History ==
=== Early beginnings ===
Hong Leong Bank began its operations in 1905 in Kuching, Sarawak, under the name of Kwong Lee Mortgage & Remittance Company. The original company was founded by Cantonese brothers Lam Tee Chew (林子昭) and Lam Song Khee (林崧祺). The company granted loans against the security of export commodities such as pepper, rubber and other indigenous products. It also provided the services of remitting money of overseas Chinese to their families in the Southeast region of China.

In the initial years, the company went through a difficult period of growth, caught in the middle of a few economic crises. The First World War broke out in 1914 causing panic in the financial circles. A few years after hostilities ended, the post-war Recession of 1920–1921 set in. After the recession, the company opened its branch in Sibu in 1923. Three years later, another branch was opened in Singapore in 1926. The year 1929 saw the start of the Great Depression that lasted until 1933. The Depression caused a sharp fall in the export earnings of commodities and many business concerns, including some banks, were in financial difficulties.

Kwong Lee Mortgage and Remittance Company survived all these setbacks because of its strong cash reserves and its conservative operational policy. Immediately after the Depression, on 26 October 1934, the company was converted into a public company under the name Kwong Lee Bank. Shortly after, the third branch of the bank was opened in Sarikei in 1937.

The Second World War caused a temporary disruption in the currency and banking system. After the war, the immediate task was one of reconstruction and rehabilitation. In this connection, Kwong Lee Bank played an important role in reviving confidence and business activities by providing financing to enable old businesses to be resumed and new ones to be set up. The aftermath of the war saw the continued expansion of the bank, and in 1964, Oversea-Chinese Banking Corporation of Singapore (OCBC Bank) under the stewardship of Tan Chin Tuan (its then chairman and managing director) acquired a 52% majority stake in Kwong Lee Bank from the Lam family.

In 1973, Kwong Lee Bank opened another branch in Bintangor.

=== Expansion ===
In late 1977, Yang Amat Mulia Tunku Osman Ibni Tunku Temenggong Ahmad, a member of the royal family from the State of Johor, came in as a shareholder of the bank and acquired 30% of its share capital from both OCBC Bank and the Lam family. The period subsequent to this saw a change in the direction of Kwong Lee Bank's expansion. From five banking branch offices in Sarawak (Kuching, Sibu, Sarikei, Serian and Bintangor) and one in Singapore, the bank expanded its operations to Peninsular Malaysia when it opened its first branch in Kuala Lumpur in May 1978 and this was followed by another branch in Johor Bahru during the same month. Over the next four years, a total of six branches were opened in Labis, Segamat, Bintulu, Kota Tinggi, Kota Kinabalu and Kluang and on 1 January 1982, the Head Office was relocated from Kuching to Kuala Lumpur.

=== Acquisitions ===
In May 1982, Kwong Lee Bank Berhad was acquired by the MUI Group, a corporate group controlled by Malaysian business tycoon Tan Sri Dato Khoo Kay Peng. Exiting shareholders include OCBC Bank (which acquired a stake in the bank in 1964) and members of the Lam family (relatives and descendants of the founder Lam Ji Chiew). Kwong Lee Bank Berhad was renamed Malayan United Bank Berhad on 2 February 1983. Subsequently, it was renamed MUI Bank Bhd. Under the MUI banner, the bank grew from 11 branches (including Singapore) to 35 branches.

On 3 January 1994, the Hong Leong Group Malaysia acquired MUI Bank Berhad through Hong Leong Credit Berhad and renamed it as Hong Leong Bank Berhad (HLBB). The acquisition of MUI Bank Berhad by Hong Leong Group Malaysia (which is controlled by Malaysian business tycoon Quek Leng Chan) followed shortly after an aborted takeover attempt by another Malaysian tycoon Tan Sri Dato Vincent Tan Chee Yioun (through his vehicle Berjaya Corporation).

HLBB was listed on the Kuala Lumpur Stock Exchange on 17 October 1994 with its total paid-up capital enlarged to RM 470 million. Since then, the growth of the bank has been remarkable.

The consolidation of the banking institution to meet the requirements of Bank Negara Malaysia marks another milestone for Hong Leong Bank Berhad. The completion of the merger of Hong Leong Bank with Wah Tat Bank and Hong Leong Finance with Credit Corporation Malaysia on 1 January 2001 marks the emergence of a larger banking group.

HLBB is a member of the Hong Leong Group. The group has diversified businesses in financial services, manufacturing, property, and infrastructure development.

=== Acquisition of EON Bank ===
On 6 May 2011, Hong Leong Bank announced that it had completed its acquisition on EON Capital Bhd's assets and liabilities, making EON Bank part of Hong Leong Bank Group.

Within close to 8 weeks, the legal vesting was concluded where all assets and liabilities of the former EON Bank was vested into HLB. The merger creates the country's fourth-largest bank with an asset size of more than RM140 billion, with a total of 329 branches.

== Corporate affairs ==
=== Personal banking ===
The bank provides banking services and financial products, which include property, auto, personal loans, payment products, share financing, investment, and insurance, as well as deposits and remittance to individuals and small businesses.

=== Business and corporate banking ===
Principal business activities include the provision of banking such as deposit and loan services covering business current account, interest-bearing auto-sweep as well as fixed deposit, and financing options ranging from asset acquisition, working capital, and debt capital market structures, for corporate, commercial and SME client base. HLB also specializes in the provision of transaction banking via cash management, trade financing and services.

=== Portfolio Investment Account ===
Hong Leong Islamic Bank (HLISB) has launched the first-in-market digital restricted investment account, Portfolio Investment Account (PIA-i). HLISB said it had collaborated with Hong Leong Islamic Asset Management (HLISAM) for the PIA-i to offer its customers the opportunity and accessibility to invest in Shariah-compliant unit trusts funds on a digital platform.

== Operations ==
=== Principal subsidiaries ===
These are HLB's subsidiaries in Asia region.

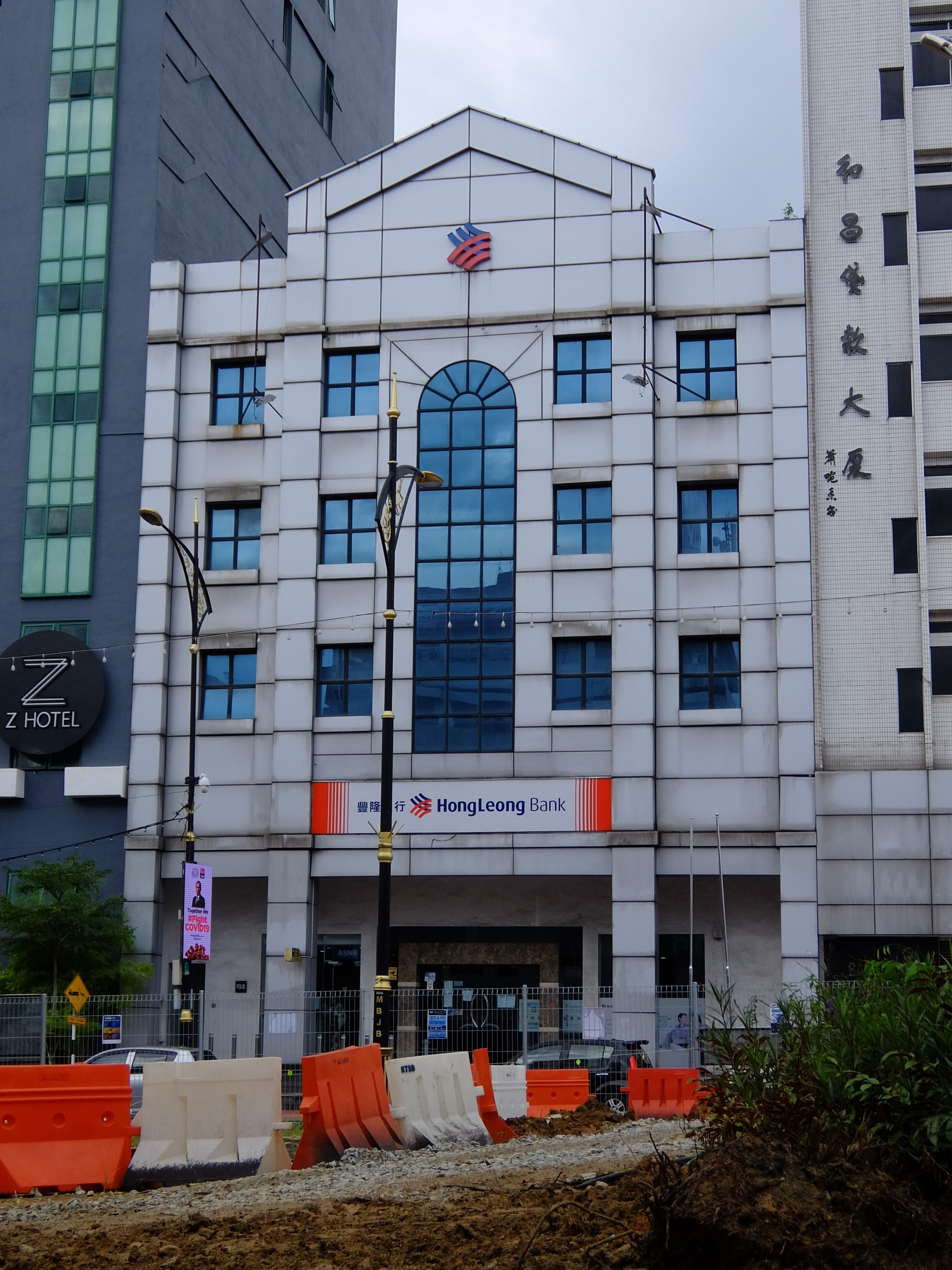
Hong Leong Bank Building in Johor Bahru city centre.

==== Malaysia ====
- Hong Leong Bank Berhad
- Hong Leong Islamic Bank Berhad

==== Singapore ====
- HL Bank Singapore

==== Hong Kong ====
- Hong Leong Bank Berhad, Hong Kong Branch

==== Vietnam ====
- Hong Leong Bank Vietnam Limited

==== Cambodia ====
- Hong Leong Bank (Cambodia) PLC

==== China ====
In March 2010, HLB together with Bank of Chengdu Co., Ltd. (BOCD) formed a joint-venture company named Sichuan Jincheng Consumer Finance Ltd Co (SJCF) to start consumer finance operations in Central and Western China. HLB has a 49% stake in the joint-venture company while BOCD held the rest.

- Bank of Chengdu Co., Ltd - 18% of equity held.

== Controversy ==
In February 2013, the bank had embarked on a rationalization exercise as part of its continuing efforts to review its business and maintain competitiveness.

As part of the exercise involves transfer non-executive staffs from all over the country to three centralized locations, it created dissatisfactions amongst affected employees. A picket was held at Wisma Hong Leong in November 2013. Alleged wrongful dismissal of the 27 employees for refusing to transfer has been referred to Industrial Court.
