= Bank Rakyat =

Bank of Malaysia

Bank Kerjasama Rakyat Malaysia Berhad
- Trade name: Bank Rakyat
- Type: Public limited company
- Industry: Banking
- Founded: 28 September 1954; 71 years ago
- Headquarters: Level 35, Menara 1, Menara Kembar Bank Rakyat, No. 33, Jalan Rakyat, KL Sentral, 50470 Kuala Lumpur, Malaysia
- Key people: Haji Abd Rani Lebai Jaafar (Chairman); Mohammad Hanis Osman (CEO)
- Products: Financial services Islamic Banking
- Operating income: ▼MYR 6.06 billion (2021); MYR 6.55 billion (2020)
- Net income: ▼MYR 0.605 billion (2021); MYR 1.251 billion (2020)
- Total assets: ▲MYR 114.7 billion (2021); MYR 111.5 billion (2020)
- Website: www.bankrakyat.com.my

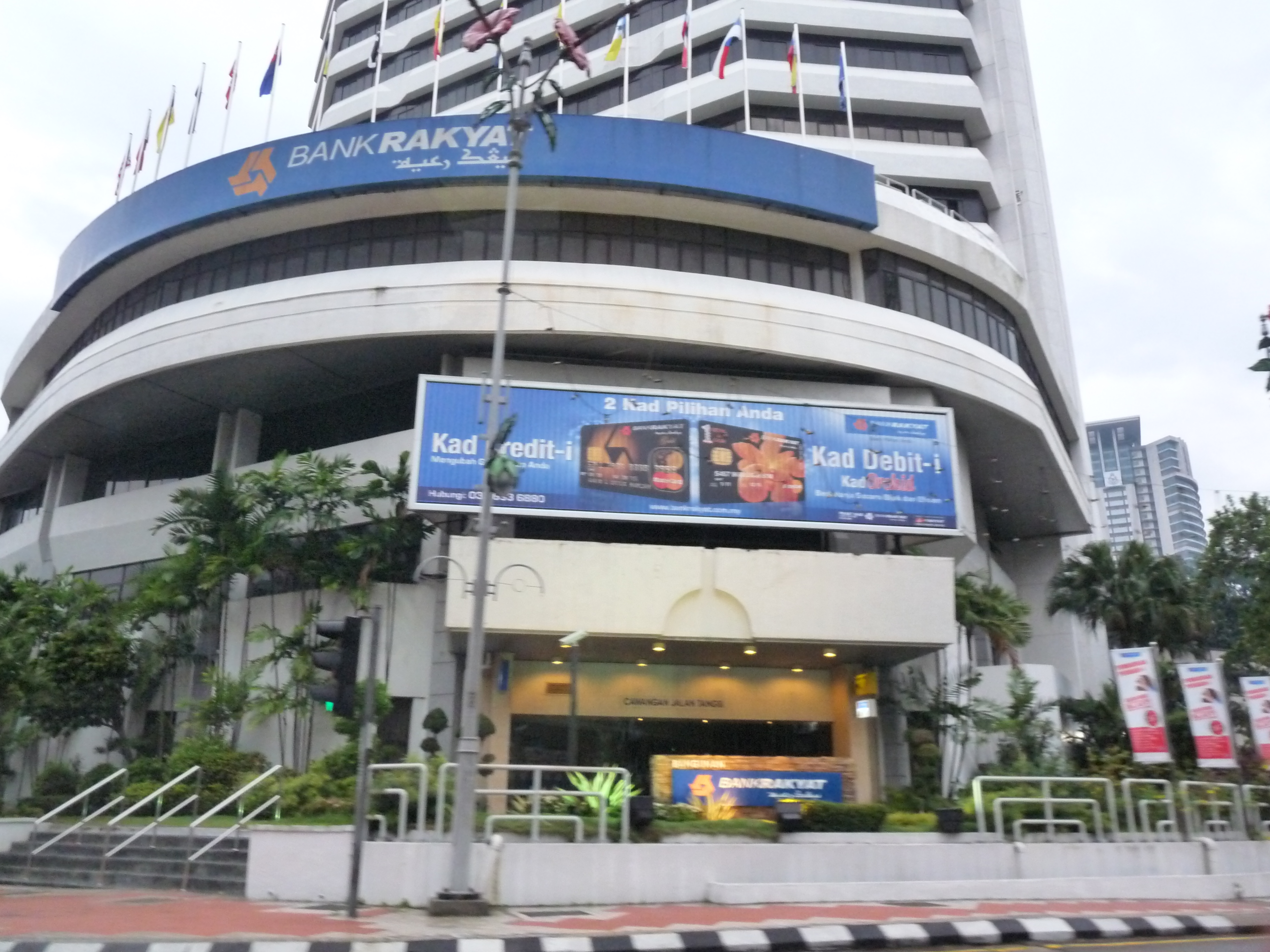
Ground part of former Bank Rakyat building at Jalan Tangsi, Kuala Lumpur in April 2013

Bank Kerjasama Rakyat Malaysia Berhad (Jawi: بڠک کرجاسام رعيت مليسيا برحد) or Bank Rakyat (Jawi: بڠک رعية) was established on 28 September 1954 under Ordinance Cooperation's Act 1948, regulated by Bank Negara Malaysia (BNM) under Development Financial Institutions Act (DAFIA 2002), Ministry Of Entrepreneur Development and Cooperatives (MEDAC) and Cooperatives Commission of Malaysia.
