= Public bank (disambiguation) =

Public bank can refer to:

- Public bank
- Public Bank Berhad
- Public Bank FC
- Public Bank (Hong Kong)
- Public sector banks in India
