= Penang Mutiara Beach Resort =

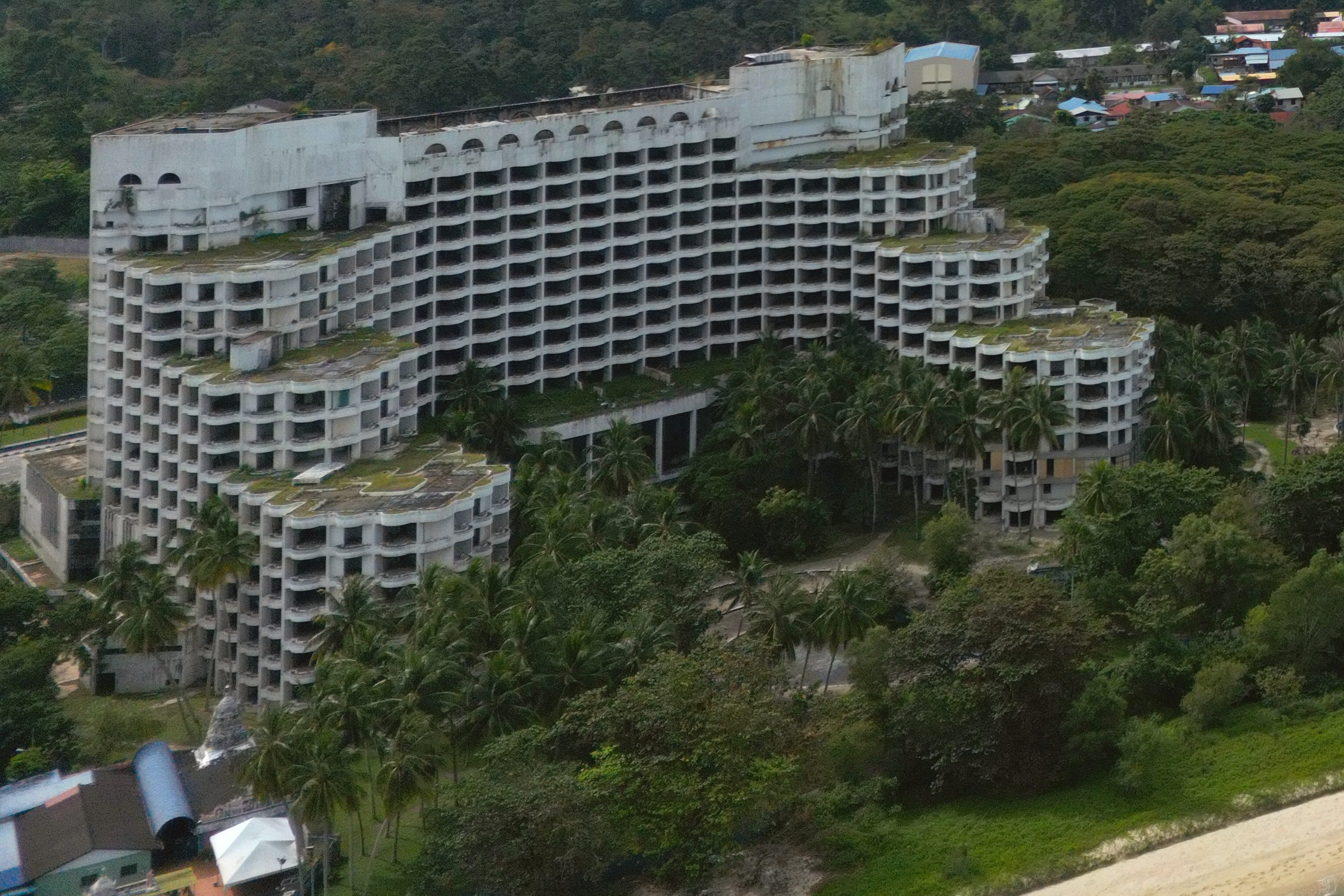
- The abandoned building in January 2024
- Interactive map of the Penang Mutiara Beach Resort area

General information
- Status: Completed
- Type: Hotel
- Location: Jalan Teluk Bahang, Teluk Bahang, 11050 George Town, Pulau Pinang, Malaysia
- Coordinates: 5.45969°N 100.21687°E
- Opening: September 16, 1988
- Closed: March 27, 2006; 19 years ago
- Owner: Tradewinds Corp Bhd

Height
- Height: 56.64 m

Technical details
- Floor count: 15

Design and construction
- Architecture firm: Kumpulan Akitek

Other information
- Number of rooms: 438

The Penang Mutiara Beach Resort is an abandoned luxury hotel on the “glowing bay” beachfront in Teluk Bahang, Penang, Malaysia. The 15-storey high-rise building has an estimated height of 56.64 m. Ownership is by Tradewinds Corp Bhd, formerly known as Pernas International Holdings Bhd. Famous guest were the Sultan of Selangor and the former prime minister of Malaysia, Mahathir Mohamad.

== History ==
The Penang Mutiara was built in 1987 and opened September 16th, 1988. Owner was Pernas-OUE, a joint venture between Overseas Union Enterprise (OUE) from Singapore and Pernas Hotel (Penang), a subsidiary of the government owned Pernas. With many recreation and conferencing facilities the Penang Mutiara was one of the most luxurious hotels in Asia. It featured 1500 hotel rooms and had a staff of 1,500 people. The leisure facilities contained two outdoor swimming pools (notable for its dolphin statues), steam and sauna baths, whirlpools, five tennis courts, four squash courts, volleyball courts, and a gymnasium. A variety of restaurants, bars and lounges was offered. For example, the House of Four Seasons with Chinese cuisine, the Tsuru-No-Ya with Japanese cuisine, La Farfalla with Italian cuisine, the Palmetto Lounge with sea view, the Puppetry Lounge with Wayang kulit shadow puppets etched on mirrors, the Garden Terrace for breakfast and an open-air bar on the poolside. In its heyday, the hotel had five-stars and was accepted in the organization The Leading Hotels of the World. Management was by Meritus Hotels & Resorts (formerly Singapore Mandarin International), the hotel-management division of OUE. Pernas Hotel Chain Sdn Bhd took over in 1999. With privatization and the majority of shares privately hold, the owner Pernas International Holdings Bhd (formerly Pernas International Hotels and Properties Bhd) was renamed into Tradewinds Corporation Bhd. Negotiations with InterContinental for the hotel-management were held and a rebranding as InterContinental Resort Penang was planned. On March 27, 2006, the hotel was closed for renovation. Reopening was planned for 2008 and delayed until 2009. It was planned to halve the number of hotel rooms to 220 and convert the other rooms to residential villas. Later this plan was also abandoned. In 2015 Tradewinds group managing director Datuk Wira Azhar Abdul Hamid stated that reopening the hotel would cost the same as building a new one.

=== Architecture ===
The architect was Kumpulan Akitek. The U-shaped layout with terraces and curved balconies offers a maximal sea view.

=== Name ===
Mutiara is Malay for “pearl” and is used as a term of endearment. Later, Pernas International Holdings (Tradewinds Corp) established Mutiara Hotels & Resorts as a chain brand.
