= List of largest banks in the United States =

The following table lists the 100 largest bank holding companies in the United States ranked by total assets as of June 30, 2026 per the Federal Financial Institutions Examination Council.

In the first quarter of 2026, there were 3,763 commercial banks and 515 savings and loan associations in the United States insured by the Federal Deposit Insurance Corporation (FDIC) with US$26.145 trillion in assets.

The list excludes the following six banks listed amongst the 100 largest by the Federal Reserve but not the Federal Financial Institutions Examination Council, because they are not holding companies: Zions Bancorporation ($89 billion in assets), Flagstar Bank ($87 billion in assets), Bank OZK ($41 billion in assets), Sallie Mae ($28 billion in assets), TowneBank ($22 billion in assets), and Optum Bank ($21 billion in assets).

== List ==
Rank	Name	Headquarters	Total assets (billions of US$) as of June 30, 2026
1	JPMorgan Chase	New York, New York	$5,015
2	Bank of America	Charlotte, North Carolina	$3,499
3	Citigroup	New York, New York	$2,894
4	Wells Fargo	San Francisco, California	$2,282
5	Goldman Sachs	New York, New York	$2,127
6	Morgan Stanley	New York, New York	$1,675
7	U.S. Bancorp	Minneapolis, Minnesota	$725
8	Capital One	Tysons, Virginia	$673
9	PNC Financial Services	Pittsburgh, Pennsylvania	$616
10	Truist	Charlotte, North Carolina	$556
11	The Bank of New York Mellon	New York, New York	$525
12	Charles Schwab Corporation	Westlake, Texas	$517
13	TD Bank, N.A.	Mount Laurel, New Jersey (Note: American subsidiary of foreign bank)	$507
14	State Street Corporation	Boston, Massachusetts	$418
15	American Express	New York, New York	$308
16	Fifth Third Bank	Cincinnati, Ohio	$300
17	BMO USA	Chicago, Illinois	$298
18	Huntington Bancshares	Columbus, Ohio	$283
19	USAA	San Antonio, Texas	$244
20	HSBC Bank USA	New York, New York	$243
21	First Citizens BancShares	Raleigh, North Carolina	$236
22	Barclays	New York, New York	$234
23	Citizens Financial Group	Providence, Rhode Island	$234
24	M&T Bank	Buffalo, New York	$219
25	UBS	New York, New York	$214
26	RBC Bank (Georgia), N.A. / City National Bank	Toronto, Canada	$204
27	Ally Financial	Detroit, Michigan	$199
28	Ameriprise Financial	Minneapolis, Minnesota	$197
29	KeyBank	Cleveland, Ohio	$191
30	Northern Trust	Chicago, Illinois	$179
31	Santander Bank	Boston, Massachusetts	$164
32	Regions Financial Corporation	Birmingham, Alabama	$161
33	Deutsche Bank	New York, New York	$130
34	Pinnacle Financial Partners	Nashville, Tennessee	$129
35	Synchrony Financial	Stamford, Connecticut	$121
36	Western Alliance Bancorporation	Phoenix, Arizona	$98
37	Raymond James Financial	St. Petersburg, Florida	$94
38	Mizuho Americas	New York, New York	$90
39	Webster Bank	Stamford, Connecticut	$85
40	East West Bank	Pasadena, California	$84
41	BNP Paribas	New York, New York	$84
42	First Horizon Bank	Memphis, Tennessee	$84
43	CIBC Bank USA	Chicago, Illinois	$83
44	Popular Bank	San Juan, Puerto Rico	$78
45	Wintrust Financial	Rosemont, Illinois	$74
46	Old National Bank	Evansville, Indiana	$74
47	UMB Financial Corporation	Kansas City, Missouri	$72
48	SouthState Bank	Winter Haven, Florida	$68
49	Valley Bank	Wayne, New Jersey	$66
50	Columbia Bank	Tacoma, Washington	$65
51	Sumitomo Mitsui Banking Corporation	New York, New York	$63
52	SoFi	San Francisco, California	$60
53	John Deere Bank	Reno, Nevada	$59
54	Cullen/Frost Bankers	San Antonio, Texas	$53
55	BOK Financial Corporation	Tulsa, Oklahoma	$53
56	Associated Banc-Corp	Green Bay, Wisconsin	$51
57	FNB Corporation	Pittsburgh, Pennsylvania	$51
58	EverBank	Jacksonville, Florida	$46
59	Stifel	St. Louis, Missouri	$44
60	Prosperity Bancshares	Houston, Texas	$43
61	MidFirst Bank	Oklahoma City, Oklahoma	$42
62	Atlantic Union Bank	Richmond, Virginia	$38
63	Hancock Whitney	Gulfport, Mississippi	$36
64	Commerce Bancshares	Kansas City, Missouri	$35
65	Banc of California	Los Angeles, California	$35
66	BankUnited	Miami Lakes, Florida	$34
67	First National of Nebraska	Omaha, Nebraska	$34
68	Fulton Financial Corporation	Lancaster, Pennsylvania	$34
69	Texas Capital Bank	Dallas, Texas	$33
70	United Bank	Charleston, West Virginia	$33
71	Glacier Bancorp	Kalispell, Montana	$31
72	Eastern Bank	Boston, Massachusetts	$31
73	Axos Financial	Las Vegas, Nevada	$29
74	City National Bank of Florida	Miami, Florida	$29
75	United Community Bank	Greenville, South Carolina	$29
76	Ameris Bancorp	Atlanta, Georgia	$28
77	Arvest Bank	Bentonville, Arkansas	$28
78	WesBanco	Wheeling, West Virginia	$27
79	WaFd Bank	Seattle, Washington	$27
80	Renasant Bank	Tupelo, Mississippi	$27
81	Customers Bank	Wyomissing, Pennsylvania	$26
82	First Interstate BancSystem	Billings, Montana	$25
83	Provident Bank of New Jersey	Jersey City, New Jersey	$25
84	Rockland Trust	Rockland, Massachusetts	$24
85	Simmons Bank	Pine Bluff, Arkansas	$24
86	Home BancShares	Conway, Arkansas	$24
87	Cathay Bank	Los Angeles, California	$24
88	Bank of Hawaii	Honolulu, Hawaii	$23
89	First Hawaiian Bank	Honolulu, Hawaii	$23
90	OceanFirst Bank	Toms River, New Jersey	$23
91	WSFS Bank	Wilmington, Delaware	$22
92	First Financial Bank	Cincinnati, Ohio	$22
93	Beacon Financial Corporation	Boston, Massachusetts	$22
94	Seacoast Banking Corporation of Florida	Stuart, Florida	$21
95	First Merchants Corporation	Muncie, Indiana	$21
96	EB Acquisition Company, LLC	University Park, Texas	$21
97	EB Acquisition Company II, LLC	University Park, Texas	$21
98	Mechanics Bancorp	Seattle, Washington	$21
99	Merchants Bank	Carmel, Indiana	$21
100	Citizens Business Bank	Ontario, California	$21

== See also ==
- Banking in the United States
- List of largest banks in the Americas
- List of largest banks in North America
- List of largest banks in Latin America
- List of largest banks in the world
