= Perbadanan Nasional =

Malaysian state-owned conglomerate

Perbadanan Nasional Berhad
- Native name: Perbadanan Nasional
- Type: State-owned enterprise
- Founded: November 1969; 56 years ago
- Headquarters: Tower 7, Avenue 7, Bangsar South City, No. 8, Jalan Kerinchi, 59200 Kuala Lumpur, Malaysia
- Key people: Datuk Mohamed Rozhan bin Mohd Ghazalli (Chairman since June 2025)
- Parent: Minister of Finance Incorporated
- Website: www.pernas.my

Perbadanan Nasional Berhad (English: National Corporation, abbreviated PERNAS) was set up in November 1969 as a wholly owned government company to carry out the resolutions at the Second Bumiputera Economic Congress. Among the major shareholders included were Malaysia's Ministry of Finance, Bank Negara Malaysia (The Central Bank of Malaysia) and Bank Bumiputera Malaysia Berhad. Pernas was put under a solid footing under the chairmanship of Tengku Razaleigh Hamzah (1970–1974) who had been the Minister of Finance from 1976 to 1984.

== Background ==
With the background of poor and very low participation of Bumiputeras in the private sector and industries at that time, PERNAS' principle were to:

- to enter undertakings which would bring high economic returns,
- when enter into joint ventures, PERNAS was to be the majority stockholder with controlling interest over operations,
- Bumiputeras were to be employed at all levels of operations and undertakings.

== History ==
Eighty subsidiaries were set up under PERNAS to achieve its objective. Malaysia National Insurance Berhad (MNI) was established in April 1970. There followed during 1971 Pernas Construction Sdn. Bhd., Pernas Engineering Sdn. Bhd., and Pernas Securities Sdn. Bhd. Then came Pernas Mining Sdn. Bhd (1973) and Pernas Edar Sdn Bhd (1974).

Tengku Razaleigh Hamzah was in the thick of what became known as the Haw Par imbroglio of the mid-1970s, working with the Singapore-based Haw Par Brothers International Ltd, then an offshoot of the empire of British wheeler-dealer Jim Slater, to acquire control of London Tin Company, the British-controlled tin conglomerate, and the Sime Darby plantations conglomerate. This was to be achieved through a complex series of transactions by which PERNAS would end up as the largest shareholder of both. It failed when Singapore accused Haw Par of financial irregularities and later jailed a senior executive and the head, Donald Watson, fled to Ireland.

But it proved a short-lived setback for Tengku Razaleigh Hamzah. Within two years, a share and proxy battle orchestrated by merchant bank Rothschild – which was also a part owner of Bumiputera Merchant Bankers – brought Sime Darby under Malaysian control and its headquarters shifted to Kuala Lumpur. Control of London Tin Company was acquired the same year. In another coup in 1979, Malaysian money made a “dawn raid” on British plantation giant, Kumpulan Guthrie Bhd, which wrenched the company from British control; most of the other British owned plantations soon followed.

Among the major corporate takeover exercise and formation of new businesses during Razaleigh's stewardship as Pernas Chairman were

- Insurance - Malaysia National Insurance Bhd,
- Banking - Maybank Bhd,
- Mining - the then world largest tin mining company, London Tin Company which later were renamed into Malaysian Mining Corporation. It is known as MM Corporation Berhad.
- Palm Oil and Rubber Producer - Sime Darby, Guthrie Berhad, Highlands and Lowlands Berhad.

Pernas also joint ventured with Sogo for its Kuala Lumpur store in 1992, which opened in 1994.

In 1971, Razaleigh's led trade delegation went to China to initiate a prospect of initiating a business relationship. During the visit to China, Razaleigh managed to meet the then China's Premier Zhou En Lai. Total trade with China stood at a mere RM105.6 million in 1971, but ballooned to RM1.6 billion in 1980. Since then the contact between the two countries has been on the increase as evidenced by the number of visits of trade, medical and sports delegations to China.
