= List of largest banks in ASEAN =

This is a list of the largest Southeast Asian banks, measured by total assets, market capitalisation, sales, and profit.

== Largest Southeast Asian banks (overall) ==
By Forbes TheGlobal2000 for 2023

SEA rank	World rank	Company	Industry	Sales (billion $)	Profits (billion $)	Assets (billion $)	Market value (billion $)	Country
1	181	OCBC Bank	Banking	25.39	4.17	417.50	42.89	Singapore
2	190	DBS Bank	Banking	16.11	5.94	554.45	61.90	Singapore
3	308	Bank Rakyat Indonesia	Banking	13.16	3.45	119.84	53.79	Indonesia
4	367	United Overseas Bank	Banking	12.00	3.32	375.98	35.36	Singapore
5	418	Bank Mandiri	Banking	10.00	2.72	120.80	32.58	Indonesia
6	462	Bank Central Asia	Banking	6.71	2.93	88.15	75.60	Indonesia
7	472	Maybank	Banking	9.90	1.87	215.17	23.77	Malaysia
8	740	Public Bank Berhad	Banking	4.57	1.39	111.98	17.54	Malaysia
9	770	CIMB	Banking	6.30	1.24	151.36	12.33	Malaysia
10	814	Vietcombank	Banking	4.40	1.15	69.13	18.13	Vietnam
11	849	Kasikornbank	Banking	8.14	1.18	124.31	10.82	Thailand
12	875	Siam Commercial Bank	Banking	5.54	1.55	97.24	10.25	Thailand
13	903	BDO Unibank	Banking	4.69	1.12	75.17	13.04	Philippines
14	931	Bank Negara Indonesia	Banking	5.02	1.23	66.15	11.76	Indonesia
15	1081	BIDV	Banking	6.04	0.78	89.95	9.38	Vietnam
16	1037	Bangkok Bank	Banking	5.74	0.92	130.46	8.89	Thailand
17	1114	Krung Thai Bank	Banking	4.65	0.99	104.37	7.52	Thailand
18	1329	Vietinbank	Banking	5.45	0.72	76.71	5.71	Vietnam
19	1433	RHB Bank	Banking	2.58	0.62	70.55	5.28	Malaysia
20	1449	Hong Leong Bank	Banking	2.03	0.61	67.68	4.65	Malaysia
21	1491	Metrobank	Banking	2.61	0.64	52.96	4.90	Philippines
22	1532	Techcombank	Banking	2.38	0.86	29.65	4.31	Vietnam
23	1605	MB Bank	Banking	3.02	0.75	30.90	3.50	Vietnam
24	1811	TMB Bank	Banking	2.47	0.33	53.81	3.64	Thailand

== Largest Southeast Asian banks by total assets ==
Information from Forbes as of 2022

Rank	Bank name	Country	Total assets (US$ billion)
1	DBS Bank	Singapore	509.1
2	OCBC Bank	Singapore	402.2
3	United Overseas Bank	Singapore	340.7
4	Maybank	Malaysia	213.2
5	CIMB	Malaysia	149.3
6	Bangkok Bank	Thailand	130.7
7	Kasikornbank	Thailand	124.3
8	Bank Mandiri	Indonesia	121.1
9	Bank Rakyat Indonesia	Indonesia	117.7
10	Public Bank Berhad	Malaysia	111.1
11	Krungthai Bank	Thailand	107.7
12	Siam Commercial Bank	Thailand	101.4
13	Bank Central Asia	Indonesia	87.7
14	Bank for Investment and Development of Vietnam	Vietnam	77.3
15	Banco de Oro	Philippines	69.5
16	RHB Bank	Malaysia	69.5
17	Bank Negara Indonesia	Indonesia	67.7
17	Vietinbank	Vietnam	67.2
19	Hong Leong Bank	Malaysia	66.7
20	Vietcombank	Vietnam	62.1
21	TMB Bank	Thailand	53.8
22	Metropolitan Bank and Trust Company	Philippines	49.1

== Largest Southeast Asian banks by market capitalisation ==
Information from Forbes as of 2022

Rank	Bank name	Country	Market capitalisation (US$ billion)
1	Bank Central Asia	Indonesia	67.6
2	DBS Bank	Singapore	63.0
3	Bank Rakyat Indonesia	Indonesia	50.1
4	OCBC Bank	Singapore	39.7
5	United Overseas Bank	Singapore	38.0
6	Bank Mandiri	Indonesia	26.9
7	Maybank	Malaysia	24.7
8	Public Bank Berhad	Malaysia	21.2
9	Vietcombank	Vietnam	16.9
10	CIMB	Malaysia	12.2
11	Bank Negara Indonesia	Indonesia	12.1
12	BDO Unibank	Philippines	11.3
13	Kasikornbank	Thailand	10.8
14	Bank for Investment and Development of Vietnam	Vietnam	8.5
15	Siam Commercial Bank	Thailand	8.3
16	Bangkok Bank	Thailand	7.5
17	Vietinbank	Vietnam	6.2
18	Krung Thai Bank	Thailand	5.9
19	RHB Bank	Malaysia	5.7
20	Hong Leong Bank	Malaysia	5.1
21	Metropolitan Bank and Trust Company	Philippines	4.8
22	TMB Bank	Thailand	3.6

== Largest Southeast Asian banks by sales ==
Information from Forbes as of 2022

Rank	Bank name	Country	Sales (US$ billion)
1	OCBC Bank	Singapore	22.9
2	Bank Rakyat Indonesia	Indonesia	12.8
3	DBS Bank	Singapore	12.4
4	Bank Mandiri	Indonesia	9.5
5	Maybank	Malaysia	9.2
6	United Overseas Bank	Singapore	8.9
7	Kasikornbank	Thailand	8.1
8	Bank Central Asia	Indonesia	6.1
9	CIMB	Malaysia	5.7
10	Siam Commercial Bank	Thailand	5.4
11	Bangkok Bank	Thailand	5.4
12	Bank for Investment and Development of Vietnam	Vietnam	5.4
13	Bank Negara Indonesia	Indonesia	4.8
14	Public Bank Berhad	Malaysia	4.5
15	Krung Thai Bank	Thailand	4.4
16	Vietinbank	Vietnam	4.4
17	BDO Unibank	Philippines	4.3
18	Vietcombank	Vietnam	3.9
19	RHB Bank	Malaysia	2.6
20	TMB Bank	Thailand	2.5
21	Metropolitan Bank and Trust Company	Philippines	2.3
22	Hong Leong Bank	Malaysia	1.9

== Largest Southeast Asian banks by profit ==
Information from Forbes as of 2022

Rank	Bank name	Country	Profit (US$ billion)
1	DBS Bank	Singapore	5.0
2	OCBC Bank	Singapore	3.6
3	United Overseas Bank	Singapore	3.0
4	Bank Central Asia	Indonesia	2.3
5	Bank Rakyat Indonesia	Indonesia	2.2
6	Bank Mandiri	Indonesia	2.0
7	Maybank	Malaysia	2.0
8	Public Bank Berhad	Malaysia	1.4
9	Kasikornbank	Thailand	1.2
10	Siam Commercial Bank	Thailand	1.1
11	CIMB	Malaysia	1.0
12	Vietcombank	Vietnam	0.96
13	BDO Unibank	Philippines	0.90
14	Vietinbank	Vietnam	0.61
15	Bangkok Bank	Thailand	0.82
16	Bank Negara Indonesia	Indonesia	0.76
17	Krung Thai Bank	Thailand	0.76
17	RHB Bank	Malaysia	0.63
19	Hong Leong Bank	Malaysia	0.57
20	Bank for Investment and Development of Vietnam	Vietnam	0.46
21	Metropolitan Bank and Trust Company	Philippines	0.45
22	TMB Bank	Thailand	0.33

== See also ==
- List of largest banks
- List of largest banks in the United States
- List of largest banks in North America
- List of largest banks in Latin America
