= AmTrust Bank =

Former American Bank based in Cleveland, Ohio

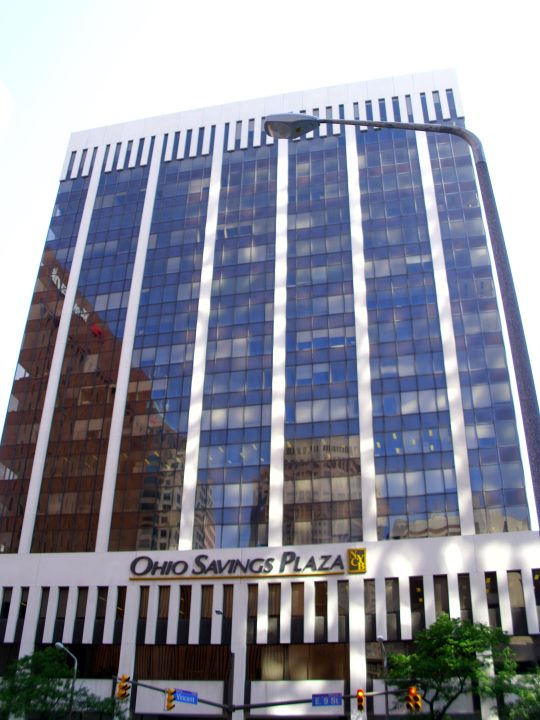
- The Ohio Savings Plaza building, the bank’s headquarters in Cleveland, Ohio, from 1977 until 2009 when the company closed.
- Type: Private
- Industry: Banking
- Founded: 1889; 137 years ago
- Defunct: December 4, 2009; 16 years ago
- Fate: Bank failure; assets acquired by New York Community Bank
- Successor: New York Community Bank (now Flagstar Bank)
- Headquarters: Cleveland, Ohio, United States

AmTrust Bank was a bank based in Cleveland, Ohio. The company was founded in 1889 and was closed in December 2009.

== History ==
The bank was founded in 1889 as Ohio Savings, Loan & Building Co.

In 1963, Leo Goldberg acquired control of the company.

In 1975, the bank acquired Citizens Federal Savings & Loan of Akron. In 1978, the bank acquired Shaker Savings. In 1989, the bank acquired Palm Plaza Savings Association, based in Boca Raton, Florida.

In 2000, the bank opened its first branches in Phoenix, Arizona. In 2007, the bank changed its name to AmTrust Bank. In January 2009, the bank sold its 5 branches in Columbus, Ohio, to WesBanco.

On December 1, 2009, AmTrust Financial Corp., the parent company of AmTrust Bank, filed for Chapter 11 bankruptcy protection. On December 4, 2009, as a result of bank failure, the bank was shut down by the Office of Thrift Supervision. It was placed into receivership and the Federal Deposit Insurance Corporation was named receiver. The assets of the bank were sold to New York Community Bank. NYCB changed the name of the acquired Ohio branches back to Ohio Savings Bank.
