= Home BancShares =

American bank holding company

Home BancShares, Inc.
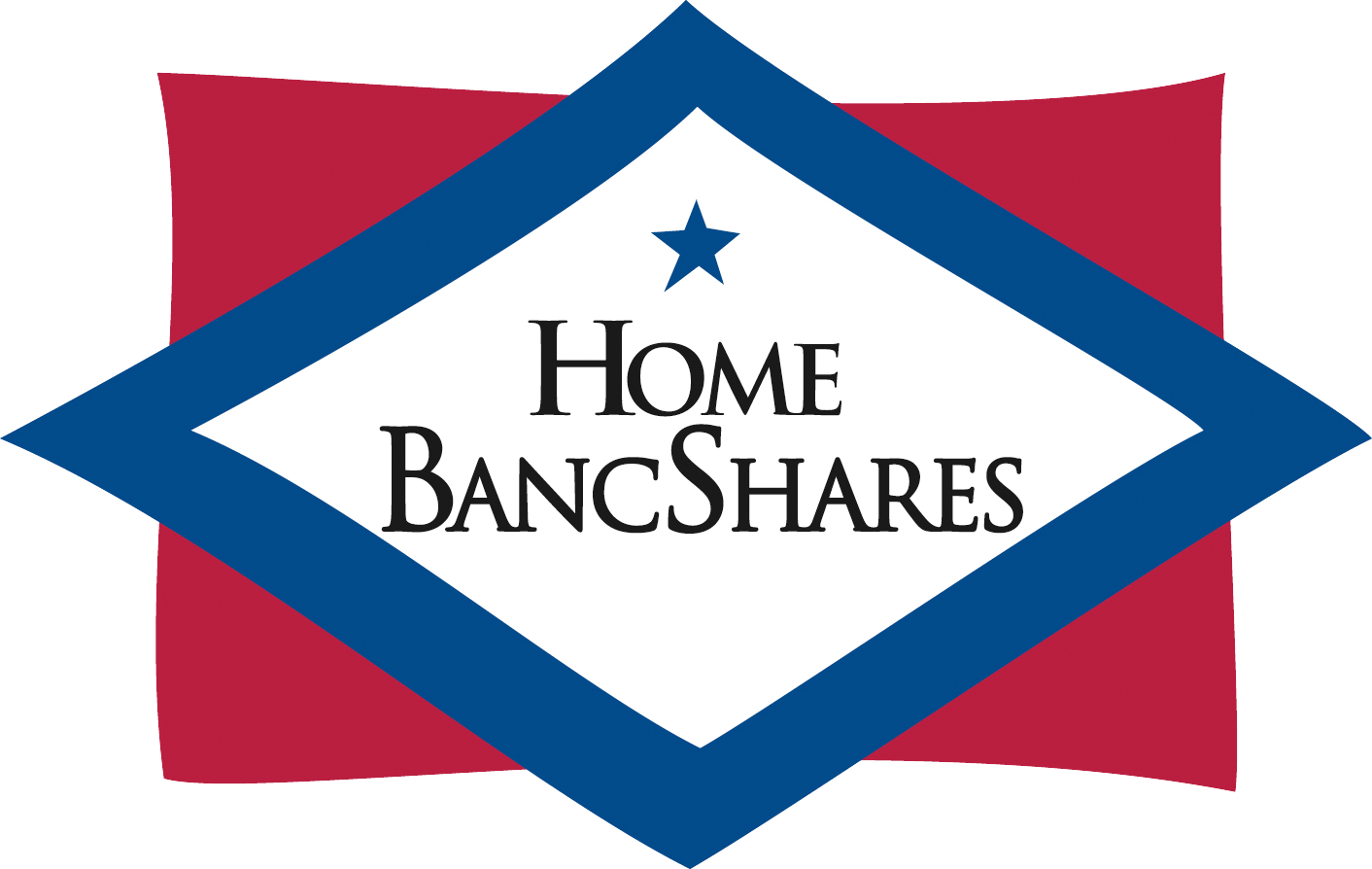
- Type: Public
- Traded as: NYSE: HOMB; S&P 400 component
- Industry: Banking
- Founded: 1999; 27 years ago
- Founder: John W. Allison; Robert H. “Bunny” Adcock, Jr.
- Headquarters: Conway, Arkansas
- Key people: John W. Allison (Chairman)
- Net income: ▲$0.300 billion (2018)
- Total assets: ▲$15.302 billion (2018)
- Total equity: ▲$2.349 billion (2018)
- Number of employees: 1,815 (2018)
- Website: homebancshares.com

Home BancShares, Inc., operating as Centennial Bank, is a bank holding company based in Conway, Arkansas. It is on the list of largest banks in the United States. The bank operates 222 branches in Arkansas, Alabama, Florida, Texas, and New York City.

== History ==
The bank was founded in 1999 as First State Bank by John W. Allison and Robert H. “Bunny” Adcock, Jr.

=== Acquisitions ===
- 2003: Community Bank, Cabot, Arkansas
- 2005: Bank of Mountain View, Mountain View, Arkansas
- 2005: Twin City Bank, North Little Rock, Arkansas
- 2005: Marine Bank, Marathon Key, Florida
- 2008: Centennial Bank, Little Rock, Arkansas
- 2010: Old Southern Bank, Orlando, Florida
- 2010: Key West Bank, Key West, Florida
- 2010: Coastal Community Bank, Panama City, Florida
- 2010: Bayside Savings Bank, Port St Joe, Florida
- 2010: Wakulla Bank, Crawfordville, Florida
- 2010: Gulf State Community Bank, Carrabelle, Florida
- 2012: Vision Bank, Panama City, Florida
- 2012: Heritage Bank of Florida, Lutz, Florida
- 2012: Premier Bank, Tallahassee, Florida
- 2013: Liberty Bankshares/Liberty Bank, Jonesboro, Arkansas
- 2014: Florida Traditions Bank, Dade City, Florida
- 2014: Broward Financial Holdings/Broward Bank of Commerce, Ft Lauderdale, Florida
- 2015: Doral Bank, Florida; Pandhandle branches
- 2015: Florida Business BancGroup/Bay Cities Bank, Tampa, Florida
- 2017: Stonegate Bank, Pompano Beach, Florida 33062
- 2021: Happy State Bank
- 2025: Mountain Commerce Bank
