= Sun National Bank =

- Type: Public company
- Traded as: Previously Nasdaq: SNBC
- Industry: Financial services
- Founded: 1985
- Defunct: January 31, 2018
- Fate: Acquired
- Successor: OceanFirst Bank
- Headquarters: Mount Laurel, New Jersey, United States
- Area served: New Jersey, New York and Pennsylvania
- Products: Banking services
- Website: www.sunnationalbank.com

Sun National Bank was an American bank that is owned by holding company Sun Bancorp, Inc. (Nasdaq: SNBC) headquartered in Mount Laurel, New Jersey. The Bank served consumers and businesses through more than 30 branch locations in New Jersey, as well as commercial lending offices in New Jersey, Pennsylvania and New York.

Sun National Bank was an Equal Housing Lender and its deposits were insured up to the legal maximum by the Federal Deposit Insurance Corporation (FDIC). In 2015, the Bank announced a major rebrand initiative for Sun National Bank, as well as its financial planning subsidiary, Prosperis Financial Solutions.

On January 31, 2018 OceanFirst Financial Corp acquired Sun Bancorp, Inc. The bank branches were rebranded and merged with OceanFirst Bank.
