= List of largest banks in the Americas =

The following is a list of the largest banks in the Americas by total assets as of April 11, 2022. Information from 2022 S&P Global Market Intelligence, and all of the largest banks on the continent are based in two countries – the United States and Canada.

| Rank | Bank name | Country | Continent | Total assets (2022) (billions of US$) |
|---|---|---|---|---|
| 1 | JPMorgan Chase | United States | North America | $3,743.57 |
| 2 | Bank of America | United States | North America | $3,169.50 |
| 3 | Citigroup Inc. | United States | North America | $2,291.41 |
| 4 | Wells Fargo | United States | North America | $1,948.07 |
| 5 | Toronto-Dominion Bank | Canada | North America | $1,486.40 |
| 6 | Goldman Sachs | United States | North America | $1,463.99 |
| 7 | Royal Bank of Canada | Canada | North America | $1,376.79 |
| 8 | Morgan Stanley | United States | North America | $1,188.14 |
| 9 | Scotiabank | Canada | North America | $978.48 |
| 10 | Bank of Montreal | Canada | North America | $908.62 |
| 11 | Canadian Imperial Bank of Commerce | Canada | North America | $676.95 |
| 12 | U.S. Bancorp | United States | North America | $573.28 |
| 13 | PNC Financial Services | United States | North America | $557.19 |
| 14 | Truist Financial | United States | North America | $541.24 |
| 15 | The Bank of New York Mellon | United States | North America | $444.44 |
| 16 | Capital One | United States | North America | $432.38 |
| 17 | Itaú Unibanco | Brazil | South America | $371.38 |
| 18 | Banco do Brasil | Brazil | South America | $340.89 |
| 19 | State Street Corporation | United States | North America | $314.62 |
| 20 | Desjardins Group | Canada | North America | $313.78 |

== See also ==
- List of banks in the Americas
- List of largest banks
- List of largest banks in the United States
- List of largest banks in North America
- List of largest banks in Latin America
