= Flagstar Bank =

American bank holding company

Flagstar Bank, N.A.
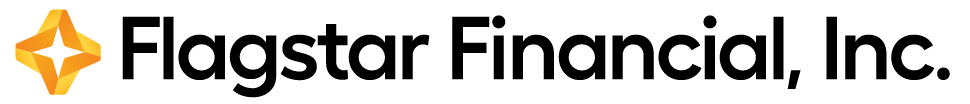

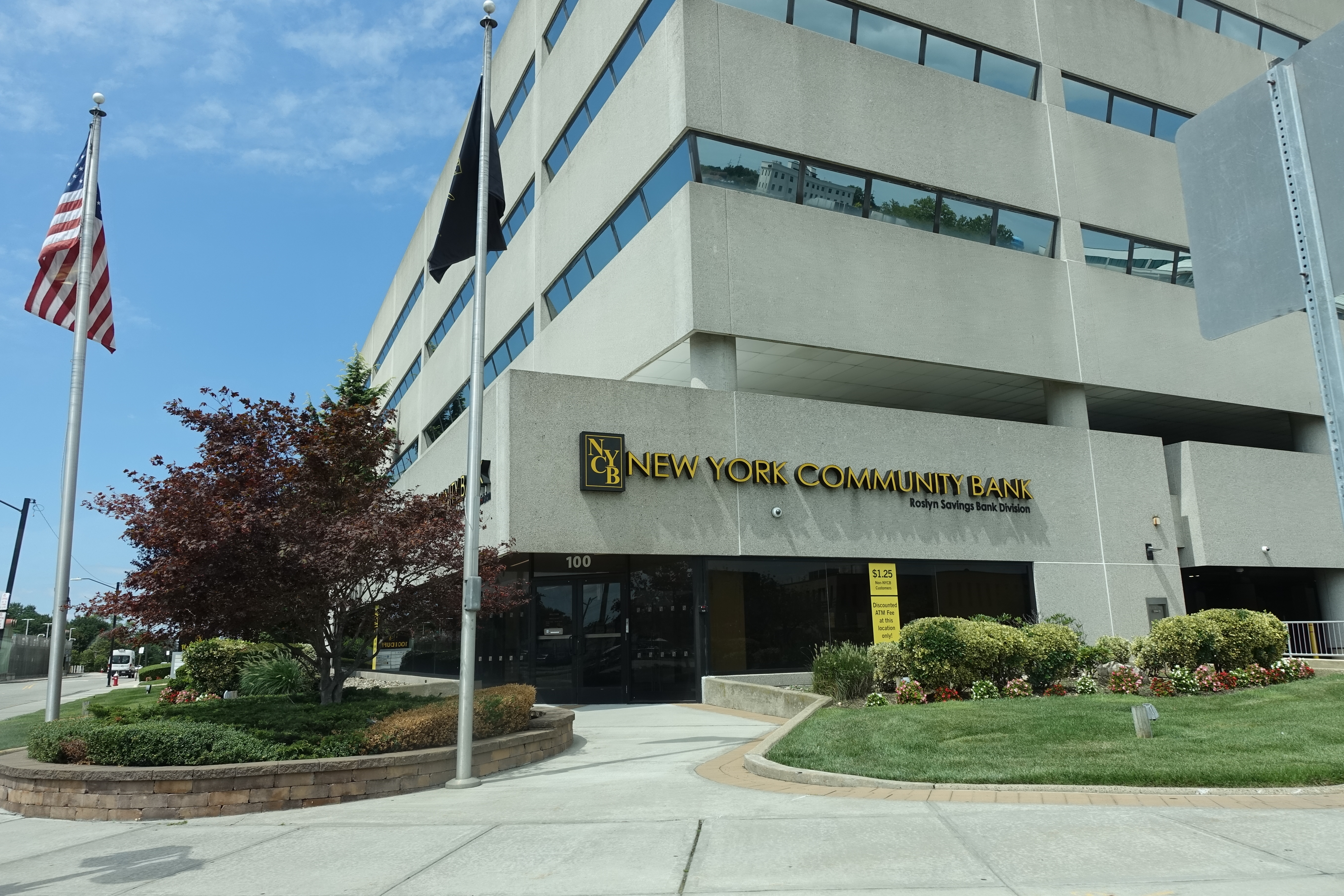
- Flagstar Bank, N.A. headquarters, Hicksville, New York, U.S.
- Formerly: Queens County Savings Bank (1859–2000); New York Community Bank (2000–2024); Flagstar Financial, Inc. (2024–2025)
- Type: Public company
- Traded as: NYSE: FLG; S&P 400 component
- Industry: Financial services
- Founded: April 14, 1859; 167 years ago
- Headquarters: Hicksville, New York, U.S.
- Number of locations: 345 branches
- Key people: Joseph Otting (CEO), Sandro DiNello (Chairman)
- Products: Banking
- Revenue: ▲$5.953 billion (2024)
- Operating income: ▼$2.152 billion (2024)
- Net income: ▼$(1.159) billion (2024)
- Total assets: ▼$100 billion (2024)
- Total equity: ▼$8.167 billion (2024)
- Number of employees: 6,993 (2024)
- Website: www.flagstar.com

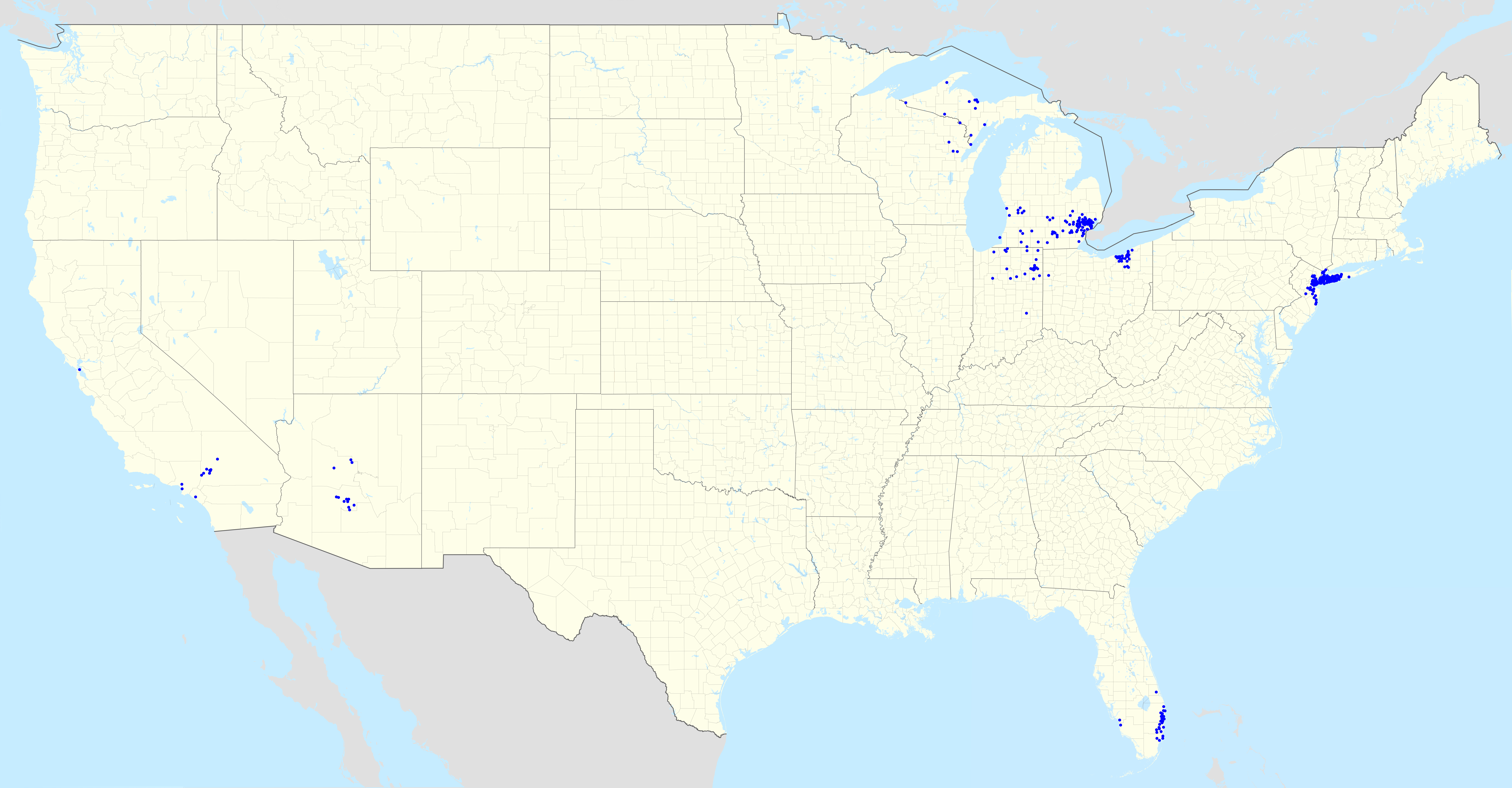
Flagstar Bank footprint.

Flagstar Bank, N.A. (FLG), is an American regional financial services holding company headquartered in Hicksville, New York. In 2023, the bank operated 395 branches under the names New York Community Bank, Queens County Savings Bank, Roslyn Savings Bank, Richmond County Savings Bank, Roosevelt Savings Bank, Atlantic Bank, Garden State Community Bank, Ohio Savings Bank, AmTrust Bank, Flagstar Bank, and Desert Community Bank. However, they rebranded all of these under the Flagstar name on February 21, 2024.

A large majority of the loans originated by the bank are either multi-family or commercial loans, many in New York City, to buildings subject to laws regarding rent regulation in New York. However, it does not offer construction loans.

== History ==
Flagstar's predecessor, NYCB, was founded on April 14, 1859, in Flushing, Queens, as Queens County Savings Bank. On December 15, 2000, it changed its name to New York Community Bank to better reflect its market area beyond Queens. In 1993, the company became a public company via an initial public offering.

NYCB underwent multiple acquisitions in the 2000s, acquiring Haven Bancorp for $196 million in 2000, Richmond County Financial in an $802 million transaction in 2001, asset manager Peter B. Cannell & Co. in 2002, Roslyn Bancorp in a $1.6 billion transaction in 2003, Long Island Financial in a $70 million transaction in 2005, Atlantic Bank of New York from the National Bank of Greece for $400 million in 2006, 11 branches in New York City from Doral Financial Corporation in March 2007, Penn Federal Savings Bank for $262 million in April 2007 (adding branches in East Central and North East New Jersey), and Synergy Bank of Cranford, New Jersey, for $168 million in stock in October 2007.

In September 2009, NYCB re-branded the Synergy branches to Garden State Community Bank. In December 2009, the Federal Deposit Insurance Corporation seized AmTrust Bank, a bank headquartered in Cleveland, OH with 66 branches and $13 billion in assets in Ohio, Florida and Arizona. NYCB acquired Amtrust, which expanded NYCB's branch footprint outside of the New York metropolitan area for the first time. In 2017, the bank sold the mortgage business acquired from the purchase of AmTrust at a $90 million profit.

In March 2010, Desert Hills Bank of Phoenix, Arizona, with $496 million in assets, was seized by the FDIC and acquired by NYCB. NYCB rebranded these branches under the AmTrust name. In June 2012, NYCB acquired the assets of Aurora Bank from Lehman Brothers. On October 29, 2015, the bank announced an agreement to merge with Astoria Bank, but the proposed merger was terminated in December 2016 after failing to win regulatory approval.

On November 4, 2016, Brooklyn Sports & Entertainment announced that the bank had acquired the naming rights to Nassau Coliseum; it was renamed "NYCB Live: Home of the Nassau Veterans Memorial Coliseum", due to agreements requiring that "Nassau Veterans Memorial Coliseum" remain in the arena's name. NYCB pulled out of its naming rights contract in late August 2020 due to uncertainty surrounding the property after a June 2020 closure and subsequent new leaseholder.

In December 2020, President, CEO and Board member Joseph Ficalora announced his retirement. Thomas Cangemi, the company's Chief Financial Officer since 2005, became president and CEO. On April 26, 2021, NYCB announced the acquisition of Flagstar Bank in an all stock strategic merger. The acquisition was completed on December 1, 2022.

In March 2023, New York Community Bancorp's Flagstar Bank took on nearly all of Signature Bank's deposits. Signature Bank was closed by regulators on March 12, 2023. Signature Bank's closure became the third largest bank failure in U.S. history. The $2.7 billion deal included Signature's $38.4 billion in assets and 40 branches. The agreement did not include about $4 billion linked to Signature's crypto business, which the FDIC said it intended to deal with directly. The 40 former branches of Signature Bank operated under Flagstar Bank as of Monday, March 20, 2023. "Depositors of Signature Bridge Bank, N.A., other than depositors related to the digital banking business, will automatically become depositors of the assuming institution," the FDIC said in a statement. The FDIC said Flagstar would also buy some of Signature's loan portfolios.

On February 6, 2024, the bond credit rating provider Moody's Investors Service downgraded NYCB's credit rating to junk status, attributed to its exposure in commercial real estate lending. NYCB had reported a quarterly loss of $252 million one week prior. As a result of their acquisition of Flagstar bank in 2022, the company rebranded all of their branches under the Flagstar name on February 21, 2024.

In February 2024, Alessandro DiNello, its executive chairman, was appointed president and CEO. His tenure was brief. In March 2024 Joseph Otting was appointed a new CEO after NYCB secured $1 billion equity injection from the investment firm run by former Treasury Secretary Steven Mnuchin, Hudson Bay Capital and Reverence Capital, at $2 a share NYCB stock had previously plummeted in late February after the bank announced a $2.4 billion December quarter earnings hit.

On March 11, 2024 NYCB announced the plans to submit one-for-three reverse stock split of its common stock to shareholders. On October 15, 2024, New York Community Bancorp officially rebranded to Flagstar Financial, and changed its stock ticker from NYCB to FLG. As of 2025, Flagstar is undergoing a multi-phase branch restructuring and cost-reduction initiative. In October 2025, per a restructuring of the holding company Flagstar Financial once again rebranded, this time as Flagstar Bank, N.A.

== See also ==
- List of largest banks in the United States
