= Teh Hong Piow =

Malaysian banker (1930–2022)

Yang Berbahagia Tan Sri Dato' Teh Hong Piow PSM SPMJ SSIJ SSAP SIMP JP
- 郑鸿标
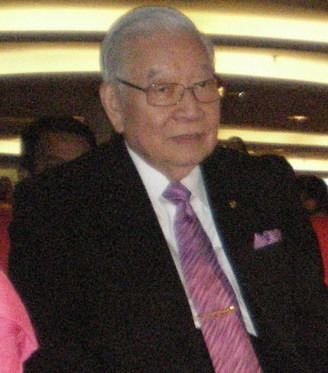
- Born: 14 March 1930; Singapore, Straits Settlements
- Died: 12 December 2022 (aged 92); Kuala Lumpur, Malaysia
- Occupations: Businessman, Entrepreneur
- Title: Founder, Chairman Emeritus, Director and Adviser of Public Bank
- Spouse: Tay Sock Noy
- Children: 4

Teh Hong Piow (simplified Chinese: 郑鸿标; traditional Chinese: 鄭鴻標; pinyin: Zhèng Hóng Biāo; Jyutping: Zeng6 Hung4 Biu1; Pe̍h-ōe-jī: Tēⁿ Hông-piau; 14 March 1930 – 12 December 2022) was a Malaysian banker and businessman. He was the founder, chairman, director, and adviser to the Public Bank Berhad in Malaysia. Teh was one of three individuals in the country who were permitted to hold a stake of more than 10% in a domestic financial institution.

== Biography ==
Teh was born in Singapore on 14 March 1930. He attended his formal primary and secondary education at the Anglo-Chinese School in Singapore. He has been married to Puan Sri Tay Sock Noy since 1956 and they have four children – three daughters, Lilian Teh Li Ming, Lillyn Teh Li Hua, Diona Teh Li Shian and a son, William Teh Lee Pang.

On 12 December 2022, Teh died at the age of 92.

== Career ==
Teh began his banking career in 1950 as a Bank Clerk in Overseas-Chinese Banking Corporation Ltd and rose in rank to officer within five years. He joined Malayan Banking Berhad as Manager in 1960. Later in 1964, he was promoted to the position of General Manager at the young age of 34, then founded Public Bank Berhad in 1965 and commencement of business operation in 1966. He has since overseen its evolution into a modern and integrated financial institution with a wide network of 259 domestic and two overseas branches.

One of Malaysia's wealthiest businessmen, Teh obtained three degrees at the unaccredited Pacific Western University and two PhDs at Clayton University (also unaccredited) and University Malaya. His net worth was estimated by Forbes to be US$4.7 billion, making him the 223rd richest person in the world and the 5th richest in Malaysia.

Teh was the Chairman of Public Bank Group. He also held leading positions in various organisations such as Public Foundation, Malaysia and LPI Capital Berhad, Malaysia (Group). On 1 January 2019, he had retired as a chairman but continued to stay on as an adviser to provide guidance and support the continued growth of Public Bank and the Public Bank group. Teh, who was also the non-executive chairman of the units – Public Islamic Bank Bhd (PIBB) and Public Investment Bank Bhd (PIVB) had retired as chairman on 1 January 2018. However, he stayed on as a non-executive director.

Teh had been awarded around 45 awards during his career, including the award for 'Greatest Malaysian Banker of All Time' by the Asia Pacific Brands Foundation.

== Honours ==
=== Honours of Malaysia ===
- Malaysia
  - Commander of the Order of Loyalty to the Crown of Malaysia (PSM) – Tan Sri (1983)
- Pahang
  - Dato Kurnia Sentosa (1966)
  - Justice of the Peace of Pahang (1967)
  - Grand Knight of the Order of the Crown of Pahang (SIMP) – formerly Dato', now Dato' Indera
  - Grand Knight of the Order of Sultan Ahmad Shah of Pahang (SSAP) – Dato' Sri (2002)
- Johor
  - Knight Commander of the Order of the Crown of Johor (DPMJ) – Dato' (1973)
  - Knight Grand Commander of the Order of the Crown of Johor (SPMJ) – Dato' (1974)
  - Knight Grand Companion of the Order of Loyalty of Sultan Ismail of Johor (SSIJ) – Dato'
