= List of largest banks in North America =

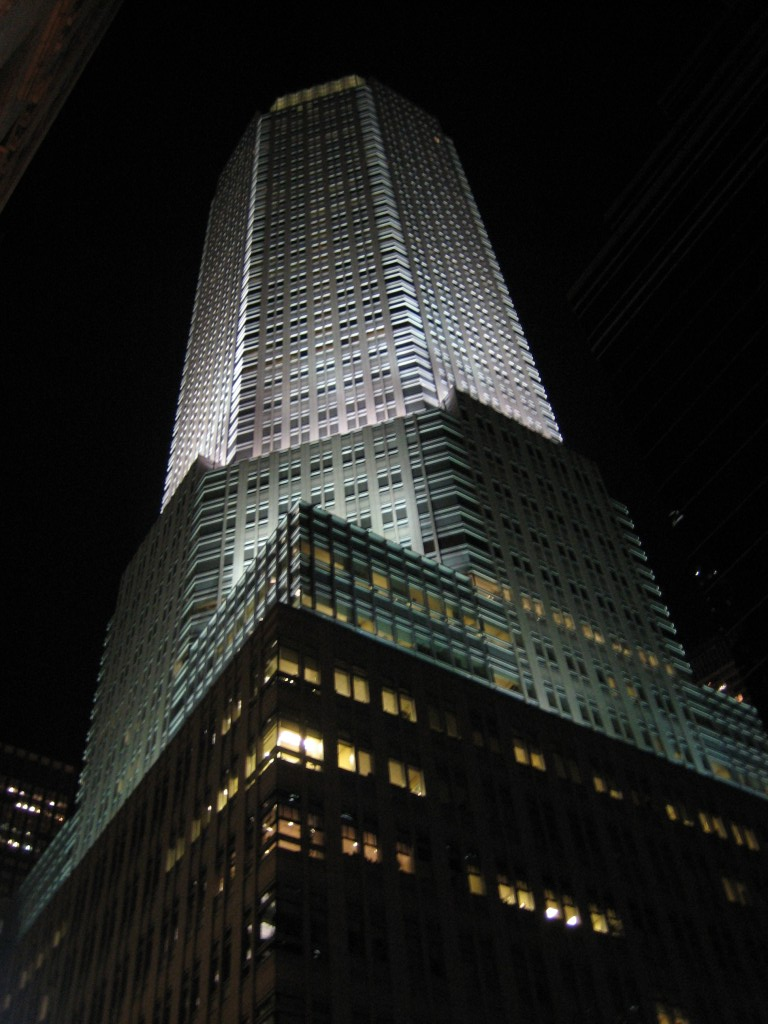
JPMorgan Chase, the largest bank in North America

List of the largest banks in North America by total assets as of 2023. Information from 2023 S&P Global Market Intelligence, and all of the largest banks on the continent are based in two countries - the United States and Canada.

Rank	Bank name	Country	Total assets (2023) (billions of US$)	Headquarter city
1	JPMorgan Chase	United States	$3,898.33	New York City
2	Bank of America	United States	$3,051.38	Charlotte
3	Citigroup	United States	$2,416.68	New York City
4	Wells Fargo	United States	$1,881.02	San Francisco
5	Royal Bank of Canada	Canada	$1,544.17	Montreal
6	TD Bank	Canada	$1,524.83	Toronto
7	Goldman Sachs	United States	$1,441.80	New York City
8	Morgan Stanley	United States	$1,180.23	New York City
9	Scotiabank	Canada	$1,029.80	Toronto
10	Bank of Montreal	Canada	$859.05	Montreal
11	CIBC	Canada	$691.31	Toronto
12	U.S. Bancorp	United States	$674.81	Minneapolis
13	PNC Financial	United States	$557.26	Pittsburgh
14	Truist Financial	United States	$555.26	Charlotte
15	Capital One	United States	$455.25	McLean
16	BNY	United States	$405.78	New York City
17	National Bank of Canada	Canada	$312.67	Montreal
18	State Street	United States	$290.81	Boston
19	Citizens Financial Group	United States	$222.25	Providence
20	First Citizens BancShares	United States	$214.65	Raleigh

== Banks by country ==
Number of banks in the top 20 by total assets
Rank	Country	Number
1.	United States	14
2.	Canada	6

== See also ==
- List of largest banks
- List of largest banks in the United States
- List of largest banks in the Americas
- List of largest banks in Latin America
- List of largest banks in Southeast Asia
