= List of largest banks =

Largest commercial banks by total assets and market capitalization

The following are lists of the largest commercial banks in the world, as measured by total assets and market capitalization.

== By total assets ==
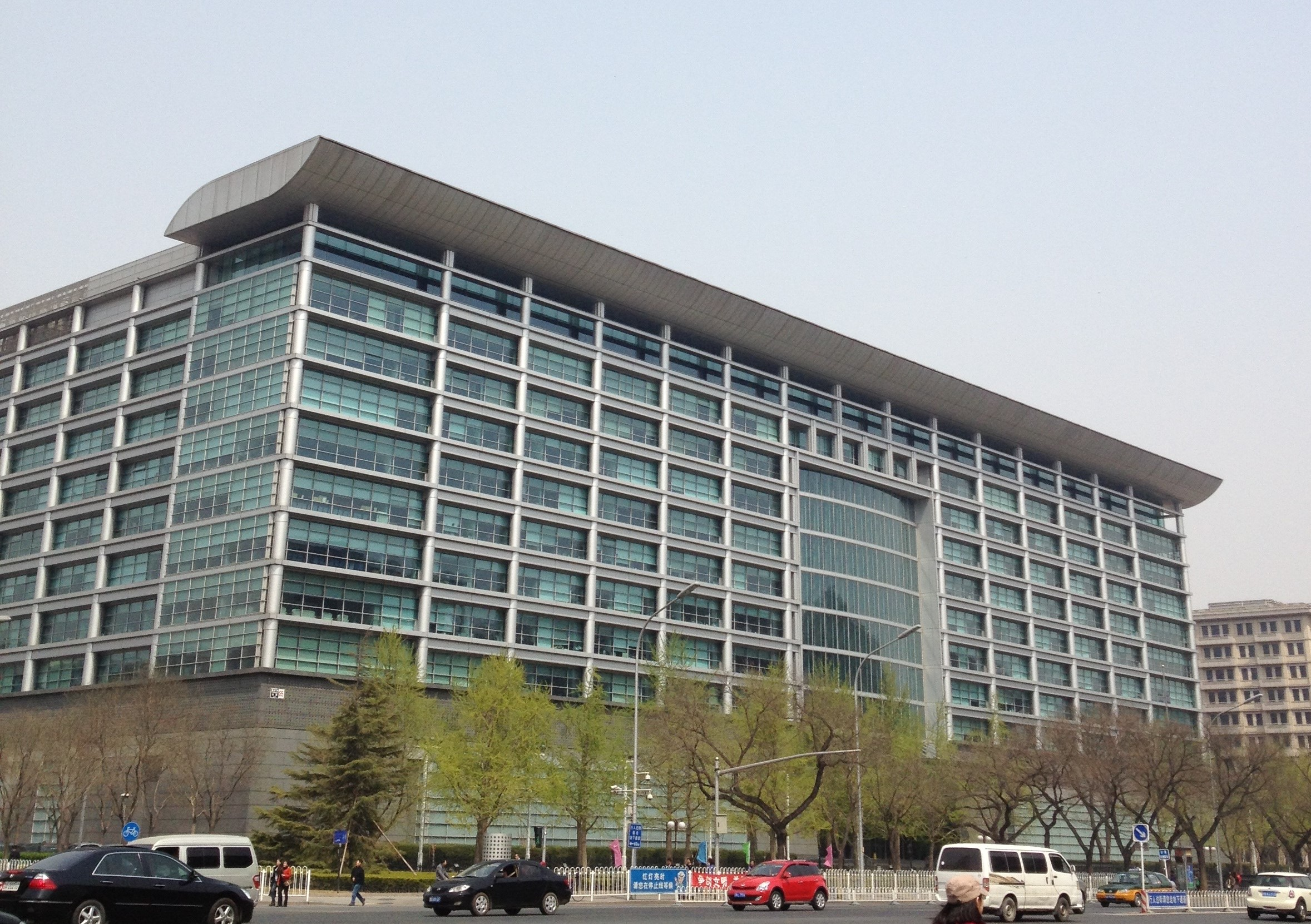
Head office of the Industrial and Commercial Bank of China, the world’s largest bank by total assets

This list is based on the April 2026 S&P Global Market Intelligence report of the 100 largest banks in the world. The ranking was based upon assets as reported and was not adjusted for different accounting treatments. Another publication which compiles an annual list of the world's largest banks is The Banker magazine. It publishes a list of the World 1000 Largest Banks every July. The financial data published by the July yearly issue of The Banker are much more extensive compared to the S&P Top 100 banks, but it is not a publication intended for the general public.

Accounting treatment affects the assets reported: for example, the United States uses US GAAP (as opposed to IFRS), which only reports the net derivative position in most cases, leading to US banks having fewer derivative assets than comparable non-US banks. When adjusted forward this netting, JPMorgan Chase would have US$4,607.43 billion in total assets, rather than US$4,002.81 billion. However, this has no impact on the ranking of the bank.

Rank	Bank name	Total assets (April 2026) (US$ billion)
1	Industrial and Commercial Bank of China	7,645.80
2	Agricultural Bank of China	6,974.82
3	China Construction Bank	6,524.05
4	Bank of China	5,484.11
5	(United States) JPMorgan Chase	4,424.90
6	(United Kingdom) HSBC	3,444.82
7	(United States) Bank of America	3,411.74
8	(France) BNP Paribas	3,279.30
9	(France) Crédit Agricole	3,148.91
10	Postal Savings Bank of China	2,671.00
11	(Japan) Mitsubishi UFJ Financial Group	2,666.71
12	(United States) Citigroup	2,622.20
13	(Spain) Banco Santander	2,251.97
14	(China) Bank of Communications	2,222.98
15	(United States) Wells Fargo	2,148.63
16	(United Kingdom) Barclays	2,078.28
17	(Japan) SMBC Group	2,020.13
18	(France) Société Générale	1,986.83
19	(Japan) Mizuho Financial Group	1,897.91
20	China Merchants Bank	1,868.71
21	(France) BPCE Group	1,813.02
22	(United States) Goldman Sachs	1,809.32
23	Royal Bank of Canada	1,726.91
24	(Germany) Deutsche Bank	1,684.94
25	(Switzerland) UBS	1,617.43
26	(China) Industrial Bank	1,586.16
27	(Canada) Toronto-Dominion Bank	1,547.69
28	Japan Post Bank	1,451.31
29	China CITIC Bank	1,448.45
30	(France) Crédit Mutuel	1,441.94
31	(China) Shanghai Pudong Development Bank	1,441.40
32	(United States) Morgan Stanley	1,420.27
33	(United Kingdom) Lloyds Banking Group	1,270.62
34	(Netherlands) ING Group	1,238.00
35	(Italy) Intesa Sanpaolo	1,127.02
36	China Minsheng Bank	1,119.83
37	(Canada) Scotiabank	1,088.15
38	(Canada) Bank of Montreal	1,069.57
39	China Everbright Bank	1,024.44
40	(Italy) UniCredit	1,021.77
41	(Spain) Banco Bilbao Vizcaya Argentaria	1,005.77
42	(United Kingdom) NatWest Group	961.71
43	(Australia) Commonwealth Bank	955.00
44	(United Kingdom) Standard Chartered	919.96
45	State Bank of India	877.07
46	(Russia) Sberbank	870.03
47	(Australia) ANZ Group	857.93
48	(France) La Banque postale	851.81
49	(China) Ping An Bank	847.22
50	(Canada) CIBC	834.98
51	(Spain) CaixaBank	779.66
52	(Germany) DZ Bank	776.59
53	(Finland) Nordea	768.29
54	(Netherlands) Rabobank	750.13
55	(Australia) Westpac	744.33
56	National Australia Bank	733.56
57	(Singapore) DBS Group	697.77
58	(Germany) Commerzbank	692.84
59	(United States) U.S. Bancorp	692.35
60	(China) Bank of Jiangsu	692.14
61	(China) Bank of Beijing	687.19
62	(China) Huaxia Bank	677.34
63	(United States) Capital One	669.01
64	(United States) PNC Financial Services	600.13
65	(Denmark) Danske Bank	590.16
66	(Brazil) Itaú Unibanco	562.14
67	(South Korea) KB Financial Group	562.76
68	(United States) Truist Financial Corp	547.54
69	(South Korea) Shinhan Financial Group	544.51
70	(Japan) Norinchukin Bank	541.55
71	(Singapore) Oversea-Chinese Banking Corporation	525.32
72	(Japan) Sumitomo Mitsui Trust Holdings	522.00
73	(China) Bank of Ningbo	519.79
74	(Austria) Erste Group	518.50
75	China Guangfa Bank	515.24
76	(India) HDFC Bank	514.82
77	(Netherlands) ABN AMRO	510.65
78	(United Kingdom) Nationwide Building Society	507.39
79	China Zheshang Bank	497.70
80	(Japan) Resona Holdings	494.80
81	(United States) Charles Schwab Corporation	491.00
82	(China) Bank of Shanghai	473.06
83	(United States) BNY	472.30
84	(Belgium) KBC Group	471.89
85	(South Korea) Hana Financial Group	467.32
86	(Russia) VTB Bank	466.33
87	National Bank of Canada	444.67
88	(Brazil) Banco do Brasil	445.10
89	(Singapore) United Overseas Bank	444.76
90	(China) Bank of Nanjing	432.12
91	(Brazil) Banco Bradesco	418.80
92	(South Korea) NongHyup Bank	417.56
93	(South Korea) Woori Financial Group	416.56
94	(Germany) Landesbank Baden-Württemberg	407.77
95	(Switzerland) Raiffeisen Group	407.32
96	(Brazil) Caixa Econômica Federal	403.70
97	(Sweden) SEB Group	398.24
98	(Japan) Nomura Holdings	395.02
99	(United Arab Emirates) First Abu Dhabi Bank	382.19
100	(Qatar) QNB Group	381.61

=== Banks by country or territory ===
Number of banks in the top 100 by total assets
Rank	Country	Number
1	China	21
2	United States	12
3	Japan	8
4	Canada	6
4	France	6
4	United Kingdom	6
7	South Korea	5
8	Australia	4
8	Germany	4
8	Brazil	4
11	Netherlands	3
11	Singapore	3
11	Spain	3
14	India	2
14	Italy	2
14	Russia	2
14	Switzerland	2
18	Austria	1
18	Belgium	1
18	Denmark	1
18	Finland	1
18	Qatar	1
18	Sweden	1
18	United Arab Emirates	1

== By market capitalization ==
Many of the largest banks in the world are part of larger bank holding companies. This structure allows them to offer various financial services, making them more resilient and competitive in the global market. The website Companies Market Cap maintains their own lists of the top largest banks in the world ranked by their market capitalization.

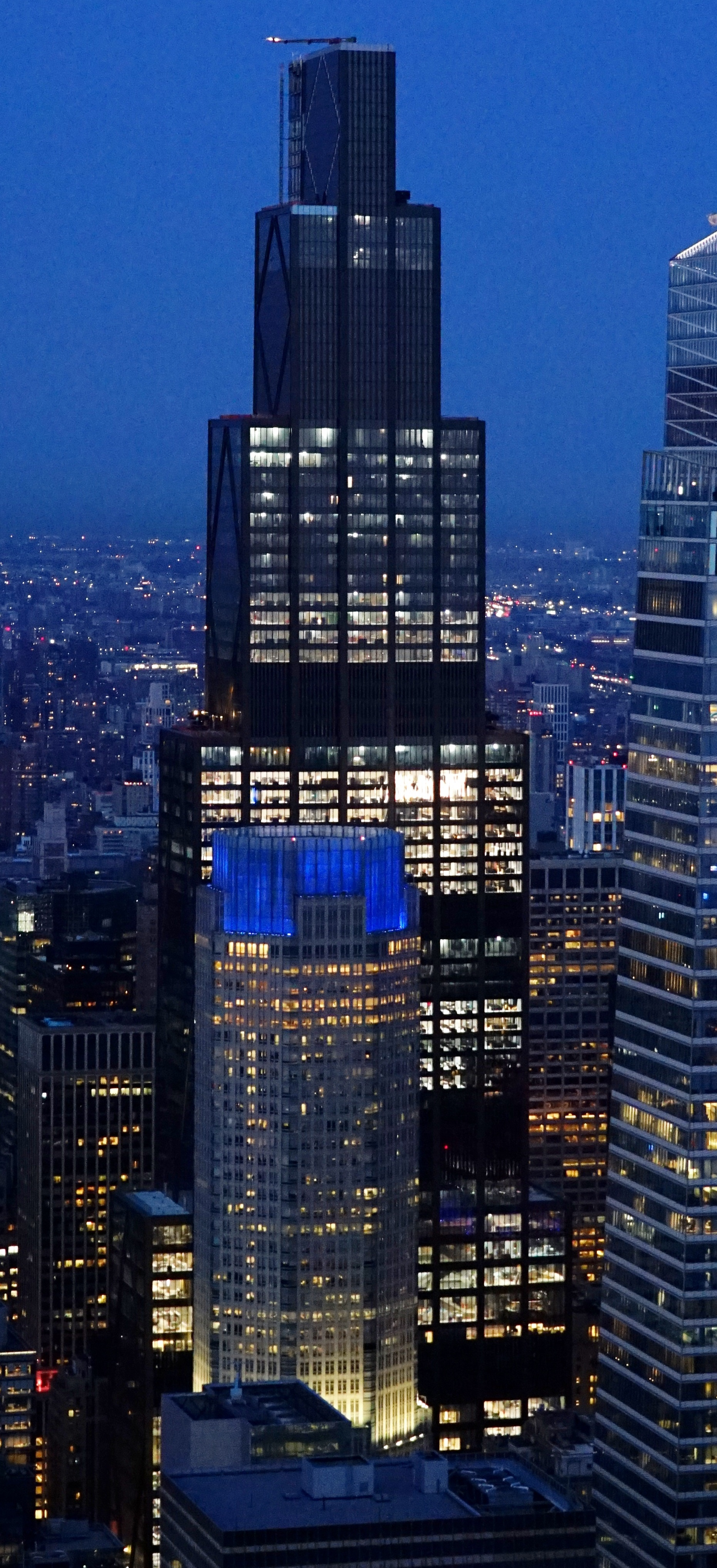
JPMorgan Chase, the largest bank in the world by market capitalization

Bank name	Top 10 largest banks (12/06/2026)	
Bank name	Rank	Market cap (US$ billion)
(United States) JPMorgan Chase	1	852.89
China Construction Bank	2	414.07
(United States) Bank of America	3	395.81
Agricultural Bank of China	4	352.05
(United States) Morgan Stanley	5	339.79
Industrial and Commercial Bank of China	6	328.41
(United Kingdom) HSBC	7	315.93
(United States) Goldman Sachs	8	312.58
Bank of China	9	299.81
Royal Bank of Canada	10	278.33

== See also ==
- List of systemically important banks
- List of largest banks in Africa
- List of largest banks in the Americas
- List of largest banks in North America
- List of largest banks in Latin America
- List of largest banks in Southeast Asia
- List of largest banks in the United States
