= List of largest banks in Latin America =

This is the list of the banks in Latin America, as measured by total assets.

== By total assets ==
The list is based on the April 2023 S&P Global Market Intelligence report of the 50 largest banks in Latin America.

Rank	Bank name	Total assets (2024) (US$ Millions)
1	(Brazil) Itaú Unibanco	519 501
2	(Brazil) Banco do Brasil	414 096
3	(Brazil) Banco Bradesco	349 873
4	(Brazil) BTG Pactual	323 779
5	(Brazil) Caixa Econômica Federal	289 015
6	(Brazil) Santander Brasil	227 538
7	(Mexico) BBVA México	166 370
8	(Mexico) Banorte	121 510
9	(Mexico) Santander México	98 584
10	(Chile) Banco de Crédito e Inversiones	85 012
11	(Mexico) Banamex	81 253
12	Santander Chile	69 767
13	(Colombia) Bancolombia	60 999
14	Banco de Chile	53 091
15	(Peru) Banco de Crédito del Perú	52 260
16	Banco del Estado de Chile	51 123
21	(Mexico) HSBC México	47 609
17	(Colombia) Grupo Aval	60.99
18	Scotiabank Chile	57.72
19	(Brazil) Banco Safra	50.76
20	(Colombia) Grupo Bolívar	41.96
22	(Mexico) Scotiabank México	38.85
23	Banco de la Nación Argentina	33.42
24	(Costa Rica) BAC Credomatic	32.24
25	(Mexico) Grupo Inbursa	30.41
26	(Peru) Intercorp Perú	29.27
27	(Brazil) Banco Cooperativo Sicredi	28.47
28	(Brazil) Banco Citibank	28.40
29	(Peru) BBVA Perú	25.74
30	(Panama) Bicapital Corp.	24.29
31	(Brazil) Banco Votorantim	23.03
32	Banco de la República Oriental del Uruguay	22.00
33	(Ecuador) Banco Pichincha	21.55
34	(Brazil) Banrisul	21.50
35	BBVA Colombia	20.55
36	(Panama) Promerica Financial Corp.	19.82
37	(Guatemala) Grupo Financiero BI	19.24
38	(Panama) Empresa General de Inversiones (EGI)	19.17
39	(Argentina) Grupo Financiero Galicia	19.11
40	(Peru) Scotiabank Perú	19.11
41	(Dominican Republic) Banreservas	18.46
42	(Chile) Grupo Security	17.43
43	(Argentina) Banco Provincia	16.91
44	(Trinidad and Tobago) Republic Financial	16.74
45	(Mexico) BanBajío	15.92
46	Santander Argentina	15.25
47	National Bank of Panama	14.60
48	(Mexico) Banco Azteca	14.42
49	(Jamaica) NCB Financial Group	13.89
50	(Brazil) Daycoval	13.37

== See also ==
- List of largest banks
- List of largest banks in Africa
- List of largest banks in the Americas
- List of largest banks in North America
- List of largest banks in the United States
- List of largest banks in Southeast Asia
- List of banks in the Americas
