= Public Bank Vietnam =

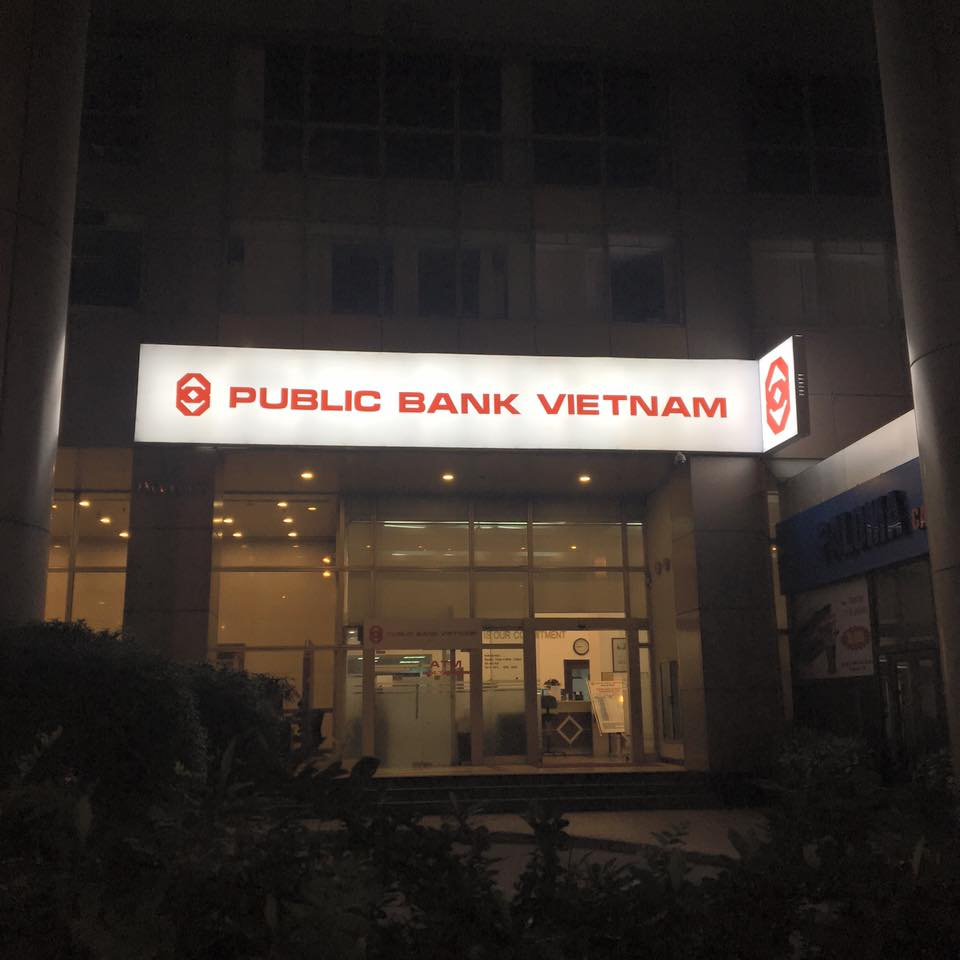
Public Bank Vietnam - Hanoi Branch located at No. 2 Ngo Quyen Street, Hoan Kiem District, Hanoi

Public Bank Vietnam Limited (PBVN) (Vietnamese: Ngân hàng TNHH MTV Public Việt Nam) is a bank based in Hanoi, Vietnam, offering financial services in Vietnam. It was transformed from VID Public Bank (VIDPB) - a joint venture between Bank for Investment and Development of Vietnam (BIDV) of Vietnam and Public Bank Berhad (PBB) of Malaysia (MYX: 1295) with equal stake established in May 1992. The transformation completed on March 24, 2016, and the bank officially commenced operations on April 1, 2016.

== Background ==
VIDPB was one of the first joint-venture banks in Vietnam when it was established in May 1992. On July 15, 2014, PBB acquired all BIDV's stake in the joint-venture. On March 24, 2015, State Bank of Vietnam (SBV) approved in principle that allow VIDPB to transform into a wholly owned subsidiary of PBB. After meeting all SBV's requirements, the bank was officially allowed to transform to Public Bank Vietnam Limited on March 24, 2016.

After the transformation, it became the 6th bank with 100% foreign ownership in Vietnam (after HSBC Vietnam Limited, ANZ Vietnam Limited, Standard Chartered Bank Vietnam Limited, Shinhan Bank Vietnam Limited and Hong Leong Bank Vietnam Limited). Its current charter capital is of VND6 trillion.

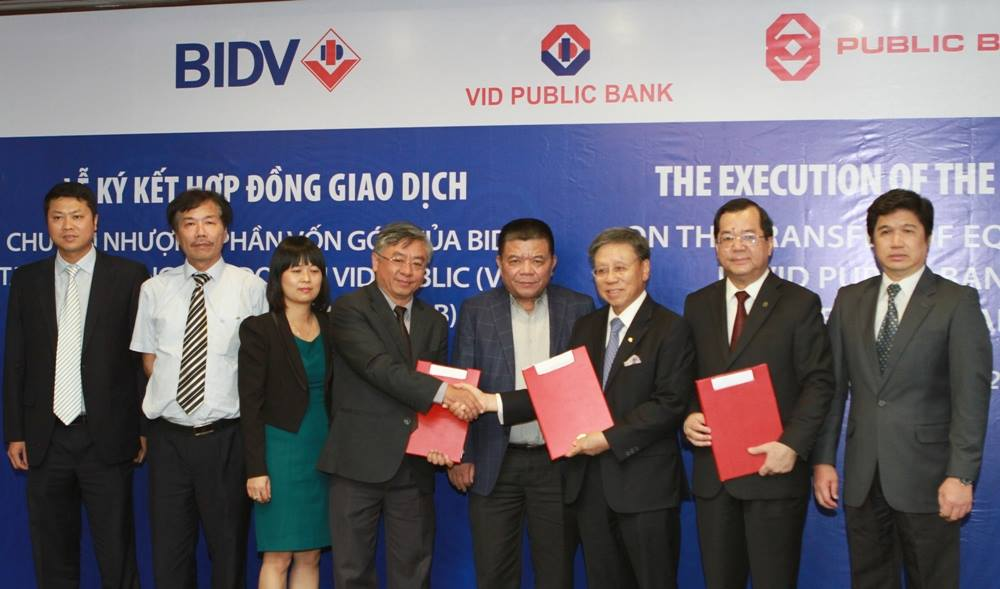
The stake acquisition ceremony on July 15th, 2014

== Operations ==
PBVN currently has a network of 17 branches, i.e. in Hanoi (5), Haiphong (1), Da Nang (2), Bình Dương (1), Đồng Nai (1) and Ho Chi Minh City (7). Besides, it also has 9 transaction bureaus, i.e. in Hanoi (2) and Ho Chi Minh City (7).

Currently, the bank serves millions of customers in 6 cities / provinces where it operates.

== Main competitors ==
- Joint Stock Commercial Bank for Foreign Trade of Vietnam (Vietcombank)
- Bank for Investment and Development of Vietnam (BIDV)
- Vietinbank
- Vietnam Bank for Agriculture and Rural Development (Agribank)

== See also ==
- List of banks in Vietnam
