= Public Bank Berhad =

Bank based in Kuala Lumpur, Malaysia

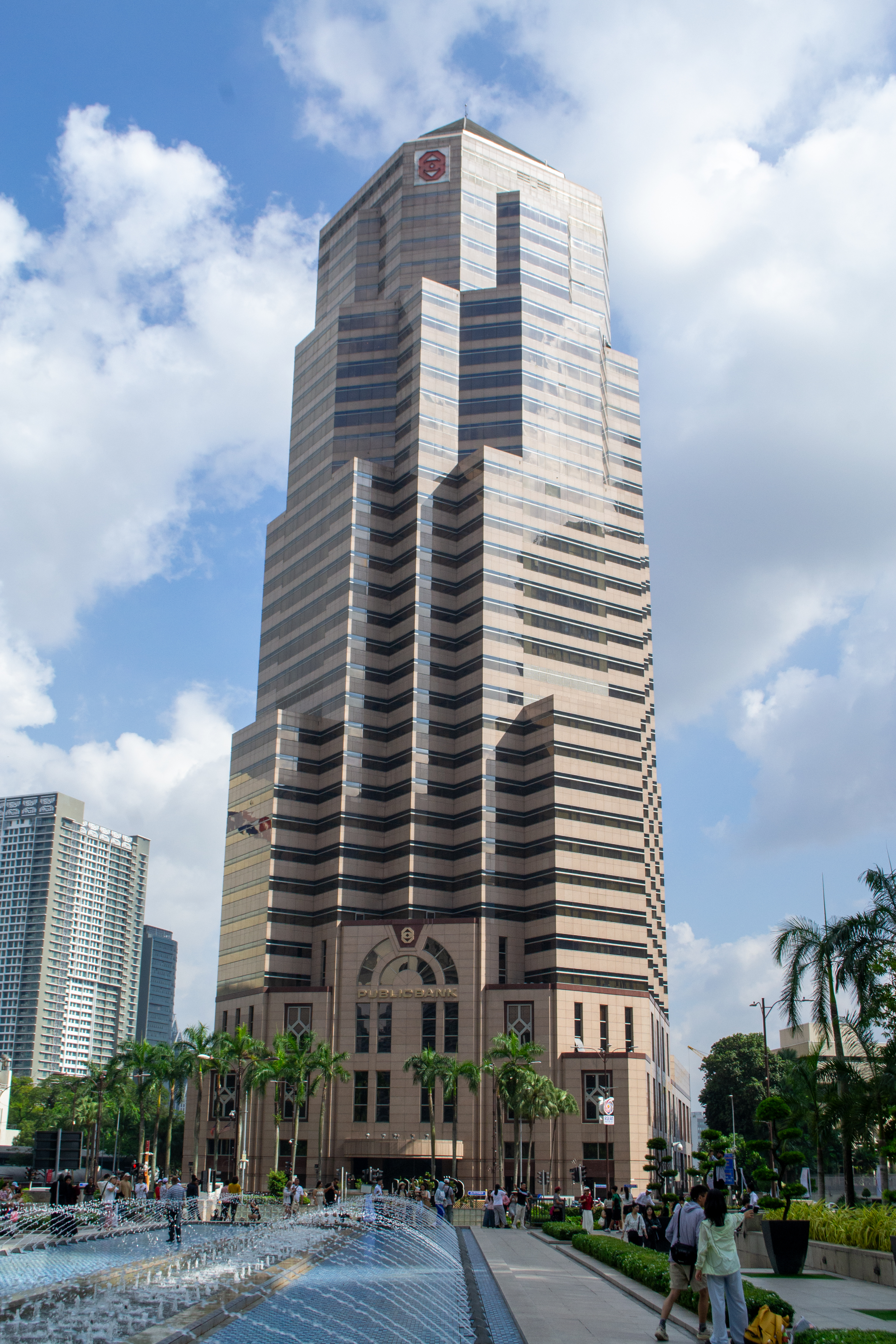
- Menara Public Bank, Public Bank Berhad headquarters in Kuala Lumpur, Malaysia.
- Company type: Public limited company
- Traded as: MYX: 1295
- ISIN: MYL1295OO004
- Industry: Banking and finance
- Founded: 1966; 60 years ago
- Founder: Teh Hong Piow
- Headquarters: Kuala Lumpur, Malaysia
- Area served: Asia-Pacific
- Key people: Lai Wan (chairman); Tay Ah Lek (managing director & CEO)
- Products: Financial services
- Revenue: ▲RM22.45 billion (US$5.49 billion) (2019)
- Operating income: ▲RM7.13 billion (US$1.74 billion) (2019)
- Net income: ▼RM5.51 billion (US$1.35 billion) (2019)
- Total assets: ▲RM432.8 billion (US$105.82 billion) (2019)
- Number of employees: >18,000
- Website: www.pbebank.com

Public Bank Berhad (MYX: 1295) is a bank based in Kuala Lumpur, Malaysia, offering financial services in Malaysia as well as the Asia-Pacific region.

The bank was founded in 1966 by Teh Hong Piow, the then general manager of Malayan Banking. The bank was listed on the Malaysian Stock Exchange in 1967.

Public Bank is currently one of the largest banks in Southeast Asia, with over RM 363.76 billion (US$91.26 billion) of assets and RM71.90 billion (US$18.04 billion) in market capitalization in 2015.

Public Bank is the largest bank in Malaysia by shareholders' funds, second largest by market capitalization, just behind Maybank and third largest by total assets, behind Maybank and CIMB.

Public Bank currently offers a comprehensive range of financial products and services which include personal banking, commercial banking, Islamic banking, investment banking, share broking, trustee services, nominee services, sale and management of unit trust funds, bancassurance and general insurance products. Public Bank's strategy is centered on growth in the retail banking business particularly on the retail consumers and small and medium enterprises ("SMEs").

== Operations ==
The Public Bank Group is well known for its strong financial performance and consistent prudent management. It is consistently accorded with strong credit and financial ratings from local and foreign rating agencies. Public Bank gained a long-term rating of AAA the Rating Agency Malaysia. It is the highest rating accorded by Rating Agency Malaysia. It also received a short-term rating of P1 with stable outlook. Standard & Poor's reaffirmed Public Bank's A− long-term rating and A-2 short-term counterparty credit rating with stable outlook. Moody's Investors Service reaffirmed Public Bank's foreign currency long-term deposit rating of A3 and short-term deposit rating of P-2 with stable outlook.

Public Bank currently has a network of 259 branches and over 2000 self terminals in Malaysia. The company also has its presence in the Asia-Pacific region with a network of 1 subsidiary in Hong Kong (Public Bank (Hong Kong) Limited, with 79 branches), 1 subsidiary in Cambodia (Cambodian Public Bank Plc, with 30 branches), 2 subsidiaries in Vietnam (Public Bank Vietnam Limited, with 12 branches), 4 branches in Laos, 3 branches in China and 3 branches in Sri Lanka.

In total, the company serves more than 9 million customers in countries where it operates.

=== Subsidiaries ===
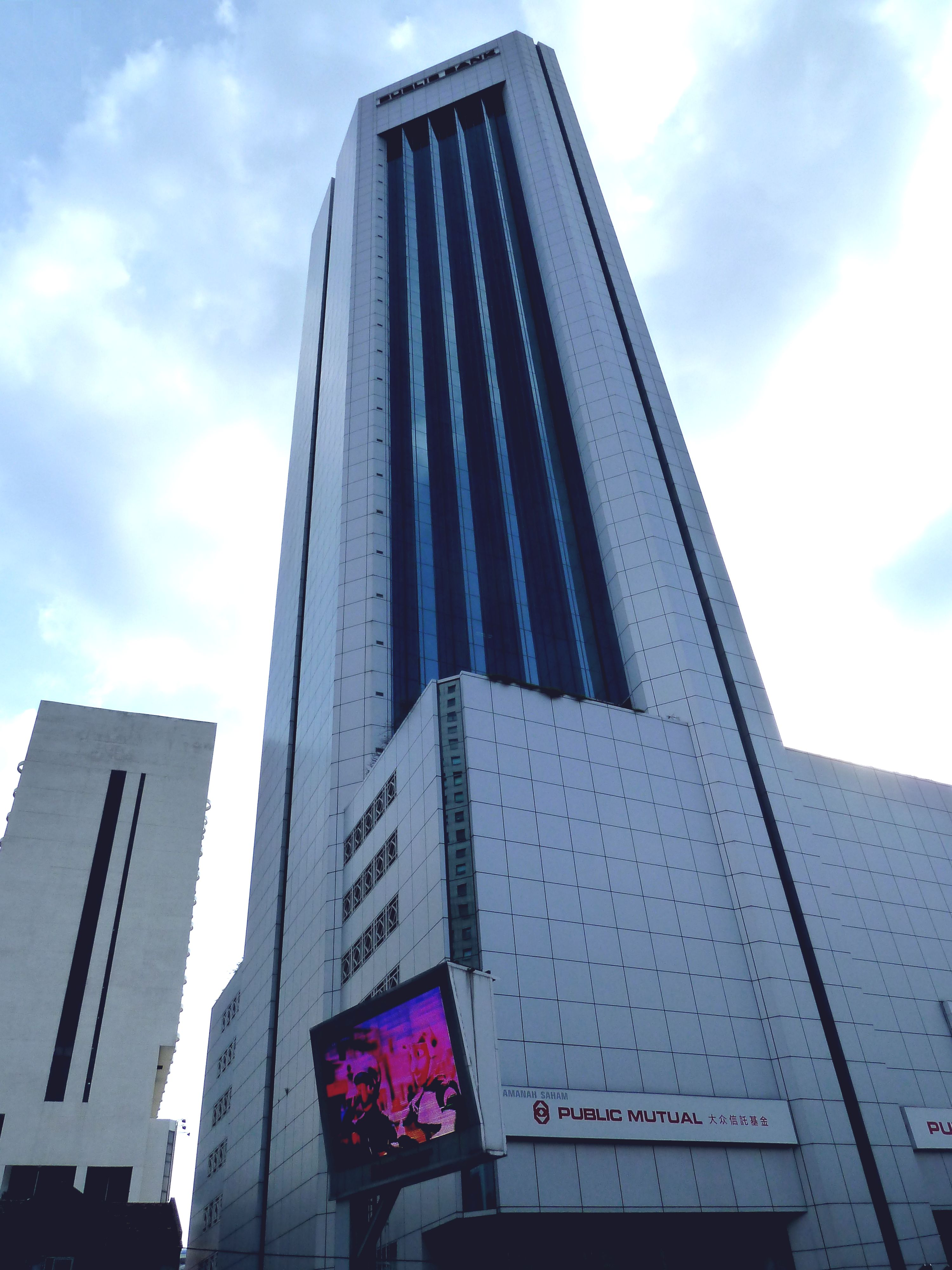
Public Bank Tower in central Johor Bahru, Johor, Malaysia

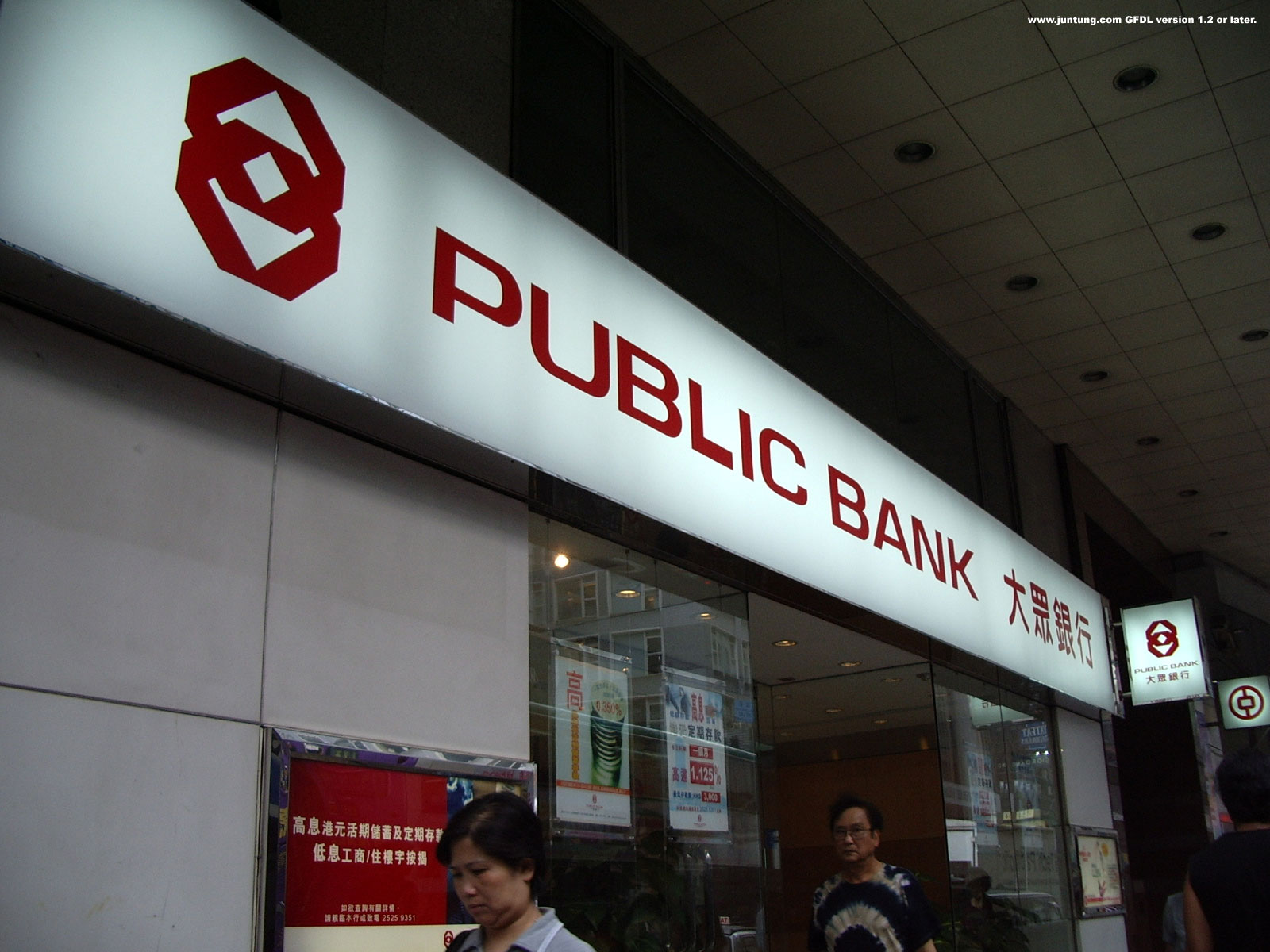
Public Bank branch at Wing On Building, Hong Kong

==== Malaysia ====
- Public Islamic Bank
- Public Investment Bank
- Public Mutual Berhad
- Public Bank (Labuan)
- PB Trustee Services

==== Hong Kong ====
- Public Bank (Hong Kong) Limited
- Public Finance Limited
- Winton (B.V.I.) Limited

==== Cambodia ====
- Cambodian Public Bank Plc
- Campu Lonpac Insurance Plc
- Campu Securities Plc

==== Vietnam ====
- Public Bank Vietnam Limited

== See also ==
- Public Bank (Hong Kong)
- List of largest Malaysian banks
- List of largest banks in Southeast Asia
