= Public Bank (Hong Kong) =

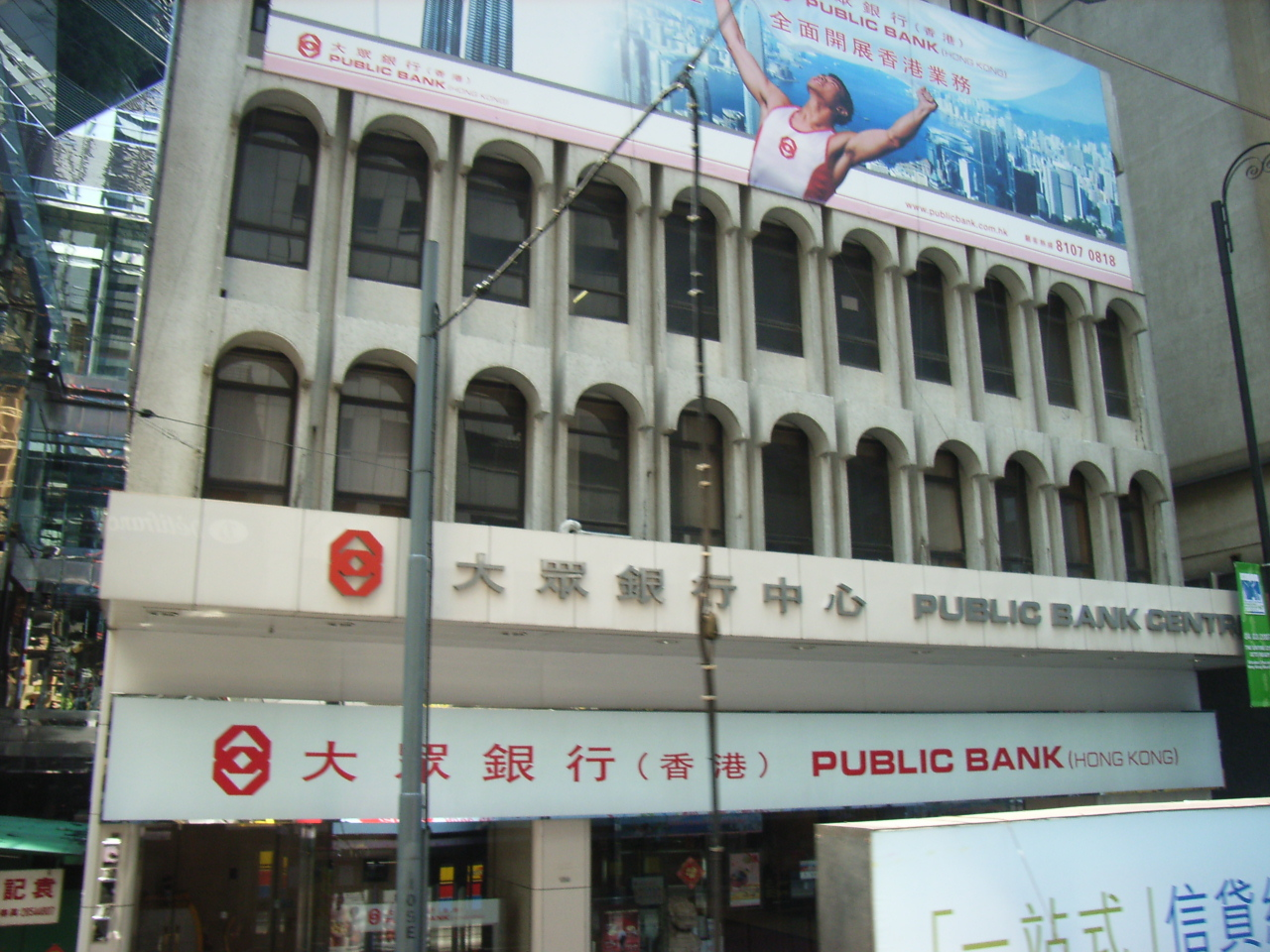
Public Bank (Hong Kong) Centre, Central, Hong Kong.

Public Bank (Hong Kong) Limited (Chinese: 大眾銀行(香港)有限公司) is a licensed bank in Hong Kong. Originally named Asia Commercial Bank Limited and owned by Asia Financial Holdings Limited (SEHK: 662, ), it was acquired by Public Financial Holdings Limited (SEHK: 626, a Public Bank Berhad subsidiary, formerly known as JCG Financial Holdings Limited, ), completed on 30 May 2006. It was subsequently renamed on 30 June 2006.

It was established in Hong Kong in the 1930s.

It has 32 branches in Hong Kong; 1 branch and 4 sub-branches in Shenzhen and a representative office each in Shanghai and Shenyang in the PRC.

== Board Executive Committee ==
- Tan Sri Dato’ Sri Dr. Teh Hong Piow (Chairman) (Demise)
- Tan Sri Dato’ Sri Tay Ah Lek
- Dato’ Chang Kat Kiam
- Mr. Tan Yoke Kong
- Mr. Chong Yam Kiang

== See also ==
- List of banks in Hong Kong
