= OceanFirst Bank =

Banking institution in the United States

OceanFirst Bank, N.A.
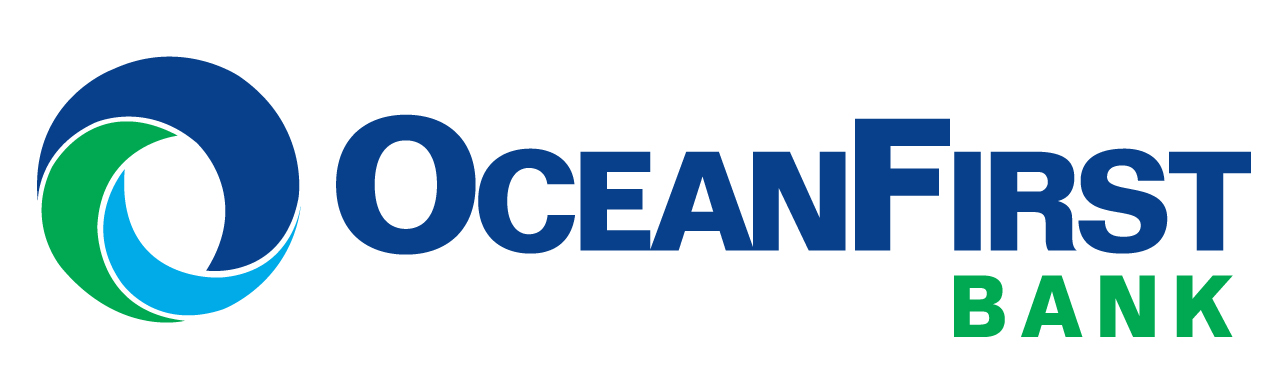
- Type: Public
- Traded as: Nasdaq: OCFC
- ISIN: US6752341080
- Industry: Investment banking; financial services
- Founded: 1902; 124 years ago
- Headquarters: Toms River, New Jersey, U.S.
- Key people: Christopher Maher (Chairman and CEO); Joseph Lebel (President and COO)
- Net income: ▼US$104.065 million (2023)
- Total assets: ▲US$13.538 billion (2023)
- Total equity: ▲US$1.661 billion (2023)
- Number of employees: 920 (2023)
- Website: oceanfirst.com

OceanFirst Bank N.A. is an American regional bank subsidiary of the U.S. financial services holding company OceanFirst Financial Corp. founded and headquartered in Ocean County, New Jersey, with operations throughout New Jersey, and in the major metropolitan markets of Philadelphia, New York City, Baltimore, Boston, Washington D.C.

The company offers checking and savings accounts, online and mobile banking, residential mortgages, commercial financing, and treasury management.

== History ==
When OceanFirst Bank opened its doors in 1902, it was founded as the Point Pleasant Building & Loan Association. In 1960, the name was changed to Ocean Federal Savings and Loan, establishing local operations until 1985 when business expansion took place into Middlesex County, NJ.

OceanFirst completed its initial public offering (IPO) converting from mutual to stock ownership in 1996, which included establishing a holding company, OceanFirst Financial Corp. In 1999, the name was changed from Ocean Federal Savings & Loan Association to OceanFirst Bank. In 2018, the company completed the conversion of its charter from a federal savings bank to a national commercial bank, changing to OceanFirst Bank N.A.

== Acquisitions ==
OceanFirst Financial Corp. enhanced its organic growth efforts with acquisitions beginning in 2015. Since then, it has completed deals to acquire 7 different financial institutions in New Jersey, and New York City. First was the acquisition of Colonial American Bank on July 31, 2015. Then, in January 2016, it agreed to buy Cape Bancorp, Inc. which was a bank with 22 branches and five loans offices, for $196 million.

On November 30, 2016, OceanFirst Financial Corp. acquired, for $146 million, Ocean Shore Holding Co. including its subsidiary, Ocean City Home Bank, a community bank in Ocean City with 11 branches in Atlantic and Cape May counties. In 2018, it completed a $475 million acquisition of Sun Bancorp Inc., the holding company for Sun National Bank. In January 2019, it closed a $77 million acquisition deal of Capital Bank of New Jersey including four branches located in Cumberland, Gloucester, and Atlantic Counties.

On January 1, 2020, OceanFirst Financial Corp. acquired Two River Bancorp and Country Bank Holding Company, Inc. in a transaction worth approximately $183 million and $102.2 million respectively. Two River Bancorp was a full-service community bank operating 14 branch locations and 2 loan production offices in Monmouth, Ocean, Union and Essex Counties. Country Bank Holding Company Inc. provided banking services to small businesses and individuals through its network of 5 Country Bank branches located in the metropolitan New York market.

In August 2024, OceanFirst acquired Garden State Home Loans, which will now operate as Garden State Home Loans, A Division of OceanFirst Bank. Garden State originates loans and is licensed to serve 14 states. Shortly after, OceanFirst acquired Spring Garden Capital Group, LLC. Spring Garden provides funding for affordable and workforce housing in the Philadelphia, Pittsburgh, Baltimore, and Washington D.C. areas.

On December 29, 2025, OceanFirst announced an agreement to acquire Flushing Financial Corp in a deal that will bring OceanFirst to be an organization with $23 billion in assets, $17 billion in total loans, and $18 billion in total deposits across 71 retail branches.

== Sponsorship ==
The first commercial naming rights for Monmouth University was announced in 2016. The name of the arena was changed from Multipurpose Activity Center to OceanFirst Bank Center following a multi-year naming rights sponsorship with OceanFirst.

== OceanFirst Foundation ==
In 1996, the bank established an independent charitable foundation named OceanFederal Foundation in 1996. In 1999, it became OceanFirst Foundation. The Foundation empowers non profit organizations to think bigger, solve more problems, and make life better. Overall, more than 9,000 grants totaling over $49 million have been given out to over 1,200 organizations.
