= WesBanco =

American bank holding company

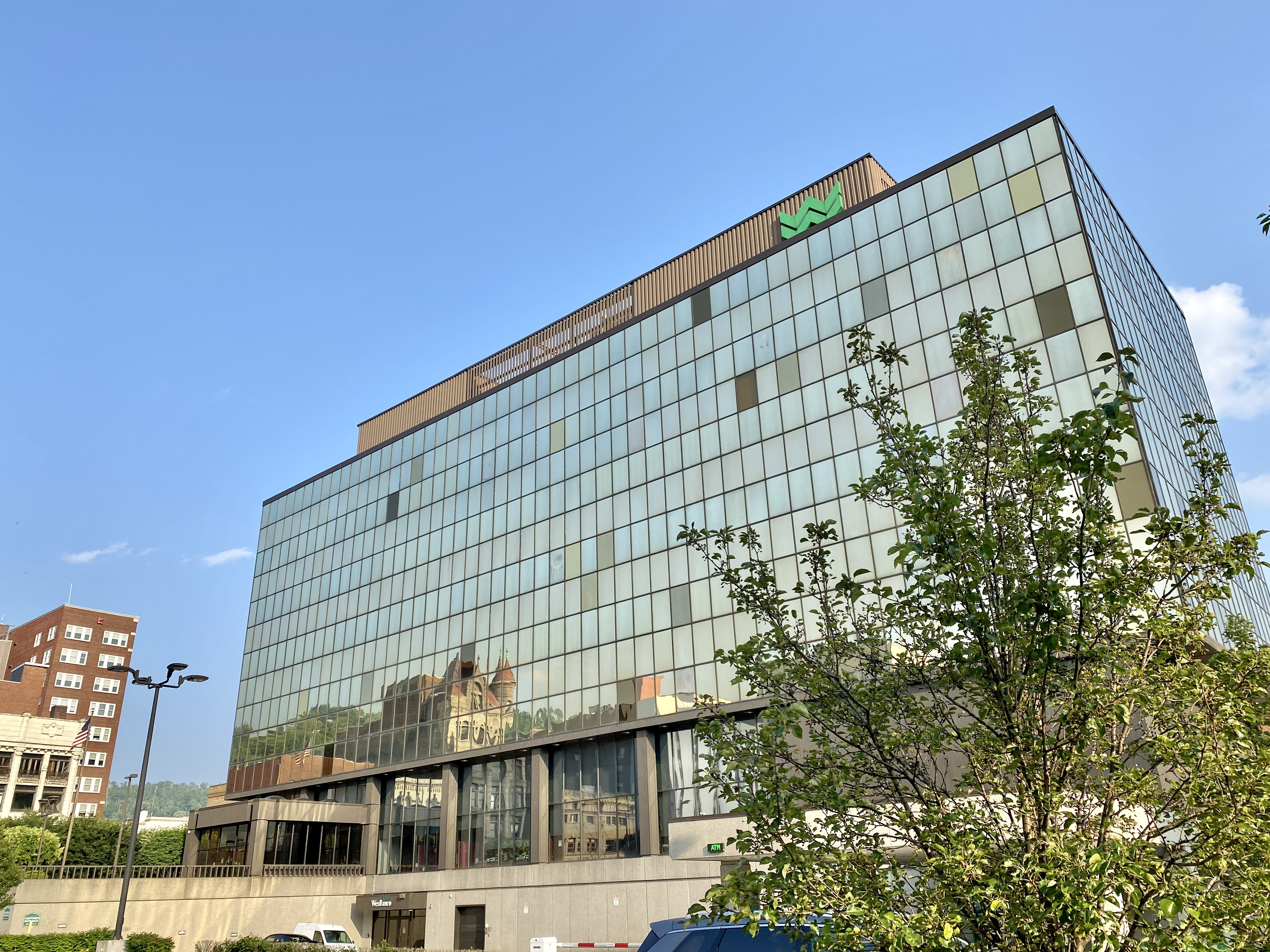
- WesBanco headquarters at 1 Bank Plaza in Wheeling, West Virginia.
- Type: Public company
- Traded as: Nasdaq: WSBC; Russell 2000 component; S&P 600 component
- Industry: Banking
- Founded: 1870; 156 years ago as "The German Bank"; 1968; 58 years ago as WesBanco
- Headquarters: Wheeling, West Virginia, U.S.
- Key people: James C. Gardill, Chairman; Todd F. Clossin, CEO & President; Robert H. Young, CFO
- Revenue: ▲$586.9 million (2024)
- Net income: ▼$151.5 million (2024)
- Total assets: ▲$18.684 billion (2024)
- Total equity: ▲$2.790 billion (2024)
- Number of employees: 2,195
- Website: wesbanco.com

WesBanco, Inc., is a bank holding company headquartered in Wheeling, West Virginia, United States. It has over 200 branches in West Virginia, Ohio, Western Pennsylvania, Kentucky, Maryland, and Southern Indiana.

WesBanco is the second-largest bank headquartered in West Virginia, after United Bank. Based on total deposits, it is the third-largest bank operating in West Virginia, after Truist Bank and United Bank.

In addition to banking services, the company offers insurance and investment products.

The company owns the naming rights to the WesBanco Arena, home of the Wheeling Nailers hockey team.

== History ==
The company was initially chartered on January 20, 1870, as "The German Bank". In 1918 the bank changed its name to "Wheeling Bank & Trust Company," and in 1933 the bank merged with Dollar Savings & Trust Company forming the Wheeling Dollar Savings & Trust Company. In 1968, WesBanco, Inc. was incorporated.

In July 1992, the company acquired First National Bank of Barnesville, Ohio.

In 2004, the company acquired Western Ohio Financial Corporation, the parent company of Cornerstone Bank, for $65.2 million.

In 2007, the company acquired Oak Hill Financial for $201 million in cash and stock.

During the 2008 financial crisis, the company received a $75 million investment by the United States Department of the Treasury as part of the Troubled Asset Relief Program. The company repurchased most of the investment in September 2009.

In March 2009, the company acquired branches in Columbus, Ohio, from AmTrust Bank, which was being liquidated.

In November 2012, the company acquired Fidelity Bancorp, expanding into the Pittsburgh area.

In February 2015, the company further expanded its Pittsburgh-area presence with the acquisition of Ellwood City, Pennsylvania-based ESB Financial Corporation.

In September 2016, the company expanded into Kentucky and Southern Indiana with the acquisition of Your Community Bankshares.

On April 5, 2018, the company acquired First Sentry Bancshares, Inc. (of Huntington, West Virginia).

On November 14, 2019, the company announced the impending merger with Maryland-based Old Line Bank with WesBanco being the surviving entity.

In March 2025, WesBanco acquired Defiance, Ohio based Premier Financial Corp in a $959 million all-stock transaction. Premier operated 73 bank branches and 9 loan offices in Indiana, Michigan, Ohio, and Pennsylvania.
