= Etiqa =

Malaysian life insurance company

Etiqa Insurance and Takaful
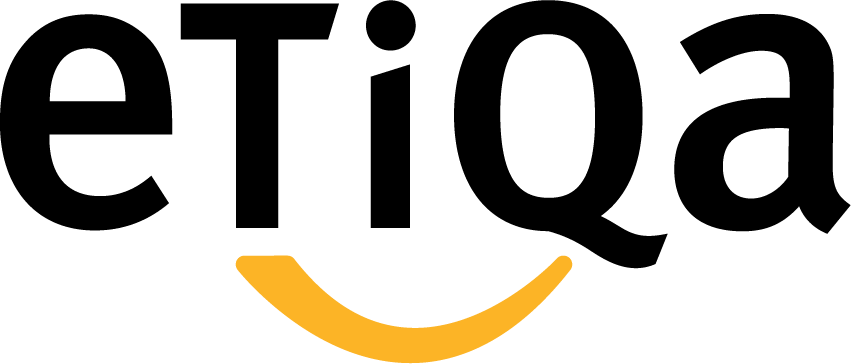
- Official logo for Etiqa Insurance and Takaful
- Type: Private limited company
- Industry: Insurance and Takaful
- Founded: November 2007; 18 years ago
- Headquarters: Dataran Maybank; Jalan Maarof, Kuala Lumpur, Malaysia
- Key people: Y. Bhg. Datuk R. Karunakaran (Chairman); Kamaludin Ahmad (Group CEO, Etiqa Insurance & Takaful)
- Products: Insurance and Takaful
- Website: https://etiqa.com

Etiqa is an insurer and takaful operator in ASEAN. It is a member of the Maybank Group, offering life and general insurance policies, as well as, family and general takaful plans. It has over 10,000 agents, 46 branches, 17 offices, and a bancassurance network consisting of over 490 branches, cooperatives, brokers, and online platforms across Malaysia, Singapore, Indonesia, the Philippines, and Cambodia. Etiqa is a digital insurance/takaful player in Malaysia with over 55% of market share in online premiums/contributions as of 2020. It is also a bank assurance player in Malaysia, in Digital Life Insurance in Singapore, and a Group Medical insurer in the Philippines.

Etiqa is composed of four main operating entities in Malaysia, namely, Etiqa General Insurance Berhad, Etiqa Life Insurance Berhad, Etiqa General Takaful Berhad, and Etiqa Family Takaful Berhad. The company also has two smaller operating entities in Labuan, as well as several other operating entities in Singapore, Indonesia, the Philippines and Cambodia.

== History ==
The Etiqa brand name was launched on November 15, 2007. This comes after a 2005 merger involving Maybank Ageas, Maybank General Assurance, Maybank Life Assurance, and Maybank Takaful with Malaysia National Insurance Bhd (MNI) and its subsidiary, Takaful Nasional Sdn Bhd.

Etiqa's first expansion into ASEAN began with Singapore's UMBC Insurance Bhd (previously named United General Insurance Company Ltd.), which had been operational since 1961. In 2001, the company entered into a partnership with Maybank and Fortis International N.V., where they were subsequently renamed as Maybank General Assurance Bhd. By 2009, the company had evolved to become the Singaporean branch of Etiqa Insurance Bhd. On June 13, 2014, Etiqa Insurance Pte. Ltd. (EIPL) Singapore was granted approval from the Monetary Authority of Singapore (MAS) to operate as a licensed life insurance and general insurance company. Etiqa Insurance Pte. Ltd. was officially launched in August 2014, selling its life insurance products at Maybank branches across Singapore.

In 2015, Maybank began acquiring shares in AsianLife and General Assurance Corp. (ALGA), an insurance group based in the Philippines which had been operational since 1958. On June 19, 2019, ALGA underwent a rebranding campaign to become Etiqa Philippines. This was accomplished in order to align with its parent company, Etiqa International Holdings (EIHSB) Malaysia, an investment holding company of Maybank.

In September 2018, Etiqa International Holdings acquired a majority stake of 75% in PT Asuransi Asoka Mas, an Indonesian-based general insurance company. EIHSB acquired 750 million shares for approximately RM64.92 million from PT Transpacific Mutualcapita which kept the remaining 25% stake in Asuransi Asoka. Between March 14, 2019, to February 18, 2020, PT Asuransi Asoka Mas was renamed to become PT Asuransi Etiqa Internasional Indonesia (EII).

In January 2018, Etiqa split into four main operating entities: Etiqa General Insurance Bhd (EGIB), Etiqa Life Insurance Bhd (ELIB), Etiqa General Takaful Bhd (EGTB), and Etiqa Family Takaful Bhd (EFTB). The decision to split into four main entities comes in support of the Malaysian Central Bank's initiative to improve its focus on its respective businesses, minimize risks, and ensure stability.

In 2019, Cambodia's Ministry of Economy and Finance (MEF) granted operating licenses to Etiqa General Insurance Cambodia Plc (EGIC) and Etiqa Life Insurance Cambodia Plc (ELIC). The following year, in May 2020, both entities became operational, offering fire insurance for retail and commercial clients, as well as, personal accident insurance products, both online and through its Maybank branches located across Cambodia.
