= Maybank =

Malaysian bank

Malayan Banking Berhad

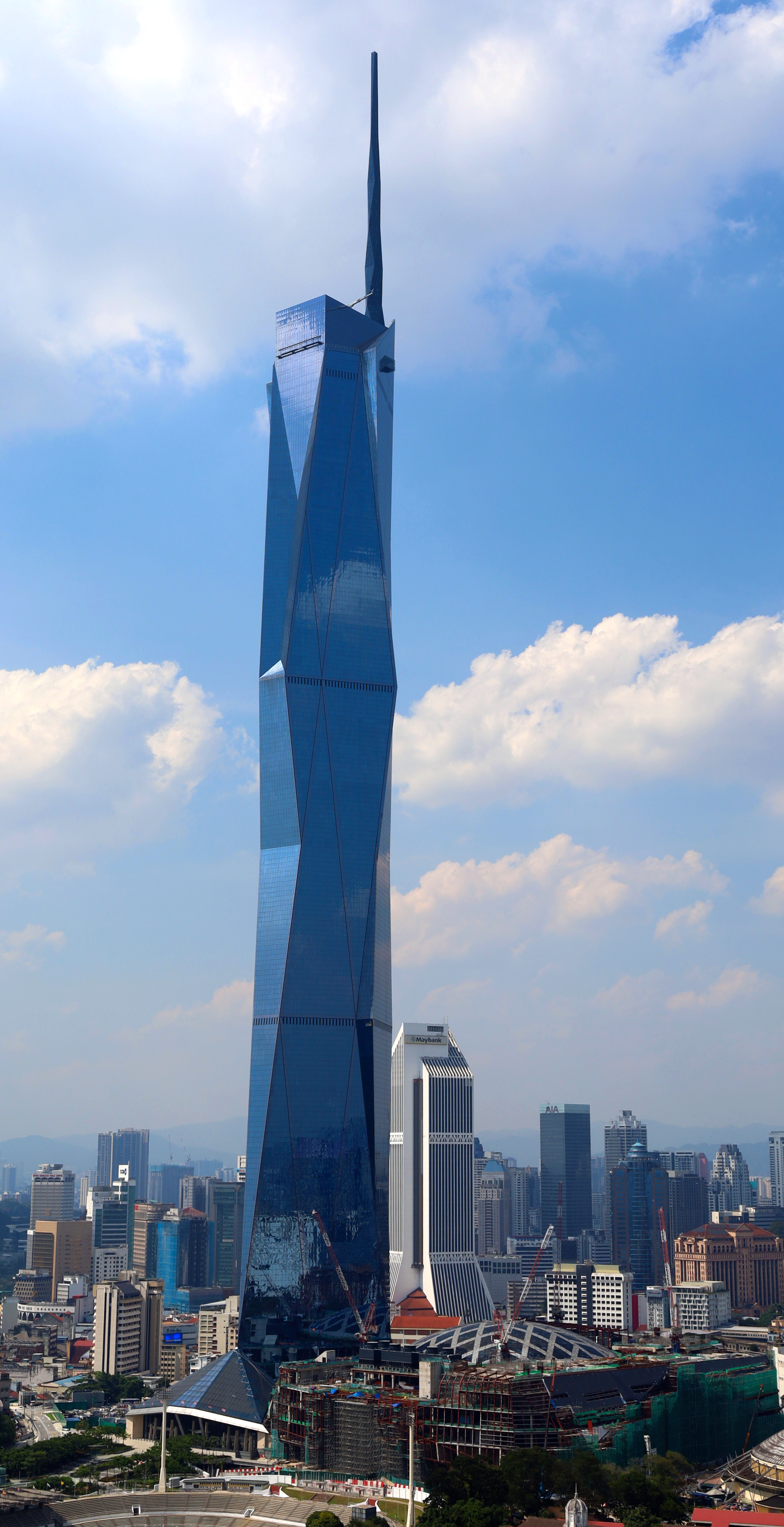
- Merdeka Maybank Tower, in Kuala Lumpur, current headquarters of Maybank
- Type: Public limited company
- Traded as: MYX: 1155; FTSE Bursa Malaysia KLCI component
- ISIN: MYL1155OO000
- Industry: Financial Services
- Founded: 31 May 1960; 66 years ago
- Founders: Khoo Teck Puat
- Headquarters: Merdeka Maybank Tower, Kuala Lumpur, Malaysia
- Area served: Southeast Asia; Greater China; Saudi Arabia; UK; US, Pakistan; India; Uzbekistan; UAE
- Key people: Khairussaleh Ramli (CEO)
- Revenue: ▲RM30.38 billion (US$7.44 billion) (2025)
- Operating income: ▲RM14.06 billion (US$3.44 billion) (2026)
- Net income: ▲RM10.52 billion (US$2.58 billion) (2026)
- Total assets: ▲RM1.05 trillion (US$257.77 billion) (2026)
- Number of employees: Over 43,000
- Subsidiaries: Maybank Islamic Berhad; PT Bank Maybank Indonesia Tbk; Maybank Philippines, Incorporated; Maybank (Cambodia) Plc; Maybank Singapore Limited; MCB Bank Limited; An Binh Commercial Joint Stock Bank; Uzbek Leasing International A.O.; Etiqa International Holdings Sdn Bhd; Maybank International Holdings Sdn Bhd; Maybank Investment Bank Berhad; Maybank Asset Management Group Berhad; Maybank Trustees Berhad; Maybank Shared Services Sdn Bhd; BinaFikir Sdn Bhd
- Website: www.maybank.com

Malayan Banking Berhad (commonly known as Maybank) is a Malaysian universal bank, with key operating "home markets" of Malaysia, Singapore, and Indonesia. According to the 2020 Brand Finance report, Maybank is Malaysia's most valuable bank brand, the fourth-top brand amongst the ASEAN countries and ranked 70th among the world's most valuable bank brands.

== Background ==
Maybank is Malaysia's largest bank by market capitalisation and total assets and one of the largest banks in Southeast Asia, with total assets exceeding US$203 billion and a net profit of US$1.98 billion for 2019.

Maybank is also ranked 106th in The Banker's 2020 Top 1000 World Banks (as of July 2020) and 349th in the Forbes Global 2000 Leading Companies (as of May 2020).

Maybank is the largest public listed company on Bursa Malaysia, the Malaysian stock exchange, with a market capitalisation of US$23.7 billion as of 31 December 2019.

Maybank's Islamic banking arm, Maybank Islamic, is the largest Islamic bank in ASEAN and Malaysia in terms of assets, and was named 2020's Global Islamic Bank of the Year by The Banker.

Maybank's network spans across all 10 ASEAN nations as well as key Asian countries and global financial centres, with a network of 2,600 retail banking branches worldwide and more than 43,000 employees.

== History ==
Maybank was founded by Singaporean business tycoon Tan Sri Khoo Teck Puat (who died in 2004) and Oei Tjong Ie. The company was led by President and CEO Tan Sri Amirsham Abdul Aziz from 1994 until March 2008 after which he was appointed Minister in the Prime Minister's Department in-charge of the Economic Planning Unit, a post he held until April 2009. Tan Sri Abdul Wahid Omar was President & CEO of Maybank Group from May 2008 to June 2013. On 1 May 2022, Dato' Khairussaleh Ramli was appointed as President & CEO of Maybank Group.

=== Timeline ===
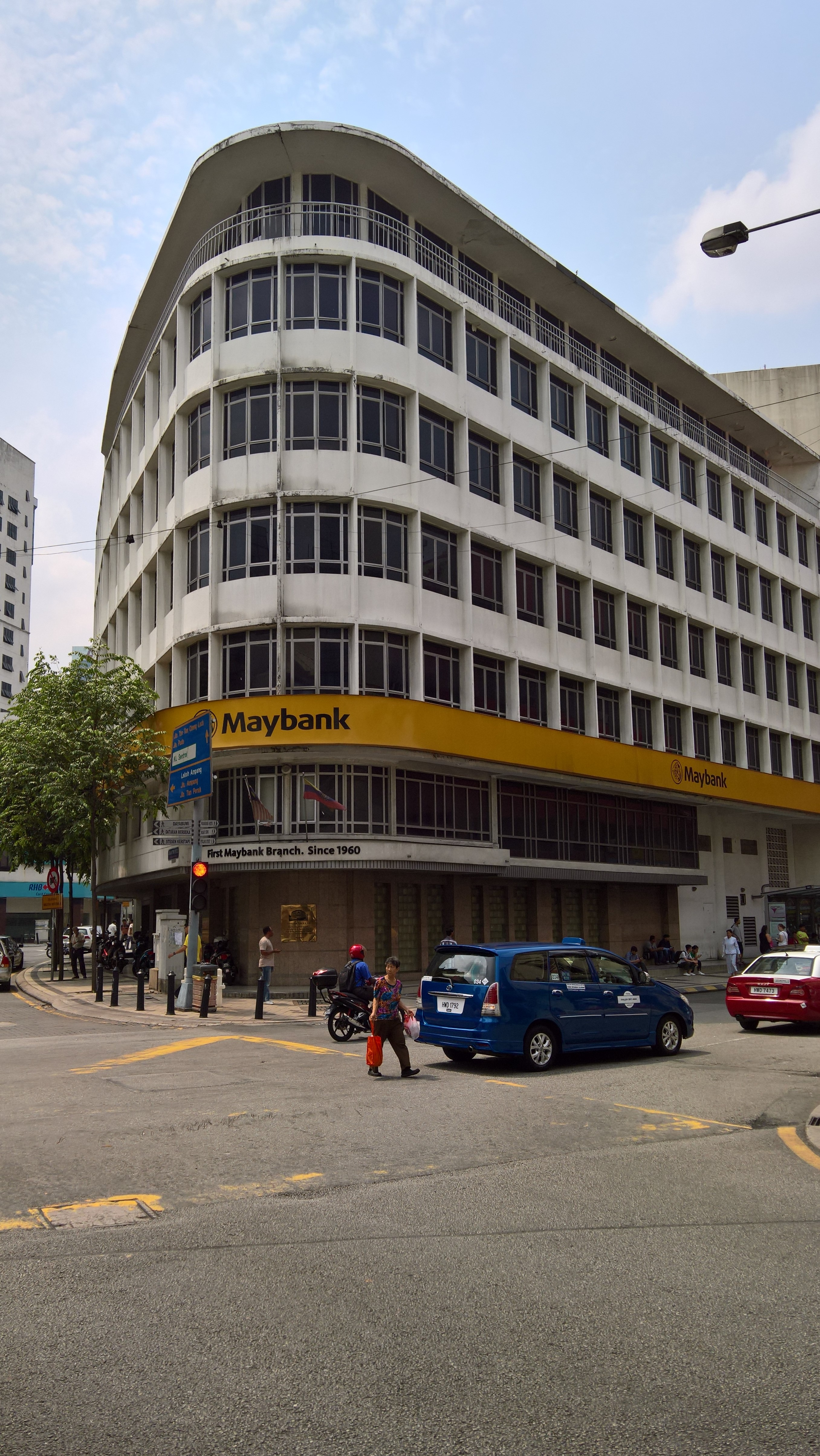
"First Maybank Branch. Since 1960" at Jalan Tun H.S. Lee, Kuala Lumpur

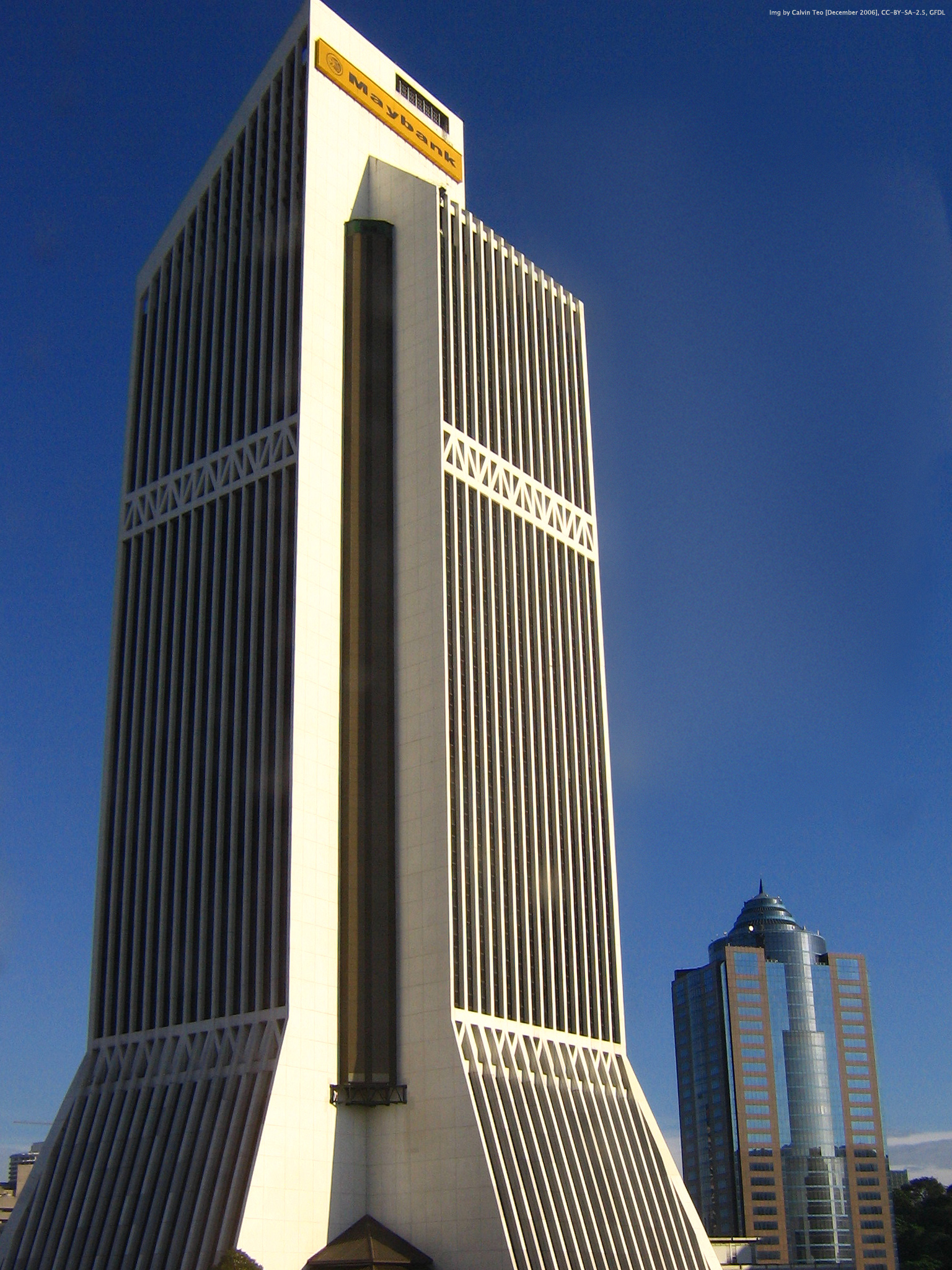
Menara Maybank, in Kuala Lumpur, former headquarters of Maybank

- 1960 – Maybank is incorporated on 31 May and begins operations in Kuala Lumpur on 12 September. Malayan Finance Corporation (later Mayban Finance) is established, the first wholly bank-owned finance company. Maybank's first overseas branch opens in Brunei on 28 November. Branches are also opened in Singapore.
- 1962 – Listed on the Kuala Lumpur Stock Exchange. Hong Kong and London branches opened.
- 1973 – Forms own investment banking arm, Aseambankers Malaysia Berhad (Asian & Euro-American Merchant Banking (Malaysia) Berhad)
- 1977 – Mayban-Phoenix Assurance Bhd is incorporated offering underwriting general insurance risks. Mayban-Phoenix Assurance was renamed Mayban Assurance in 1986
- 1984 – New York branch opened
- 1990 – Set up new operations in the Federal Territory of Labuan
- 1992 – Mayban Securities formed.
- 1993 – Maybank Ventures begins operations in February. In September, Aseam Leasing and Credit Bhd are incorporated, offering leasing and hire purchase activities. Opens representative office in Beijing, People's Republic of China
- 1994 – Entered a joint-venture with PT Bank Nusa Nasional (Indonesia), bringing the Maybank name to the Indonesian market. A branch is opened in Phnom Penh, Cambodia
- 1995 – Maybank (PNG) Ltd. opens in Port Moresby and Lae
- 1996 – Hanoi branch and a representative office in Ho Chi Minh City are officially opened. Maybank Bankassurans launched, offering insurance products to customers at bank branches. Kwong Yik Bank sold to Rashid Hussain Berhad in December
- 1997 – Acquired a 60% stake in PNB-Republic Bank of the Philippines and renamed it Maybank Philippines Inc
- 2000 – First Malaysia bank to open a branch in Shanghai, People's Republic of China. Acquired Pacific Bank and the Phileo Allied Bank Bhd, and then merged in 2001
- 2001 – Maybank and Fortis International NV collaborate to set up Mayban Fortis Holdings Bhd in a 70:30 partnership. All Maybank's insurance companies are grouped under Mayban Fortis Holdings Bhd
- 2002 – Mayban Takaful Bhd commences operations, the first Takaful company owned by a conventional bank in Malaysia. First Malaysia bank to operate in Bahrain
- 2005 – Acquired Malaysia National Insurance Bhd (MNI) and its subsidiary, Takaful Nasional Sdn Bhd (Takaful Nasional)
- 2006 – Maybank acquired American Express' card business in Malaysia
- 2007 – Launched Etiqa, the new brand name for Maybank's conventional and takaful businesses under Mayban Fortis Holdings Bhd
- 2008 – Islamic banking subsidiary, Maybank Islamic Berhad, established. Acquires stakes in An Binh Bank (Vietnam), MCB Bank Ltd of Pakistan and Bank Internasional Indonesia
- 2009 – Renamed Aseambankers to Maybank Investment Bank. Completed a RM6 billion rights issue – the largest in Malaysian corporate history
- 2010 – Introduced a Dividend Reinvestment Plan, the first public listed company in Malaysia to do so
- 2011 – Acquired Kim Eng Holdings Limited, making it its subsidiary
- 2012 - First branch in Laos opened, completing the Group's footprint in all 10 ASEAN nations
- 2015 - Exited Papua New Guinea with the sale of Maybank (PNG) Limited and Mayban Property (PNG) Limited to Kina Ventures Ltd.

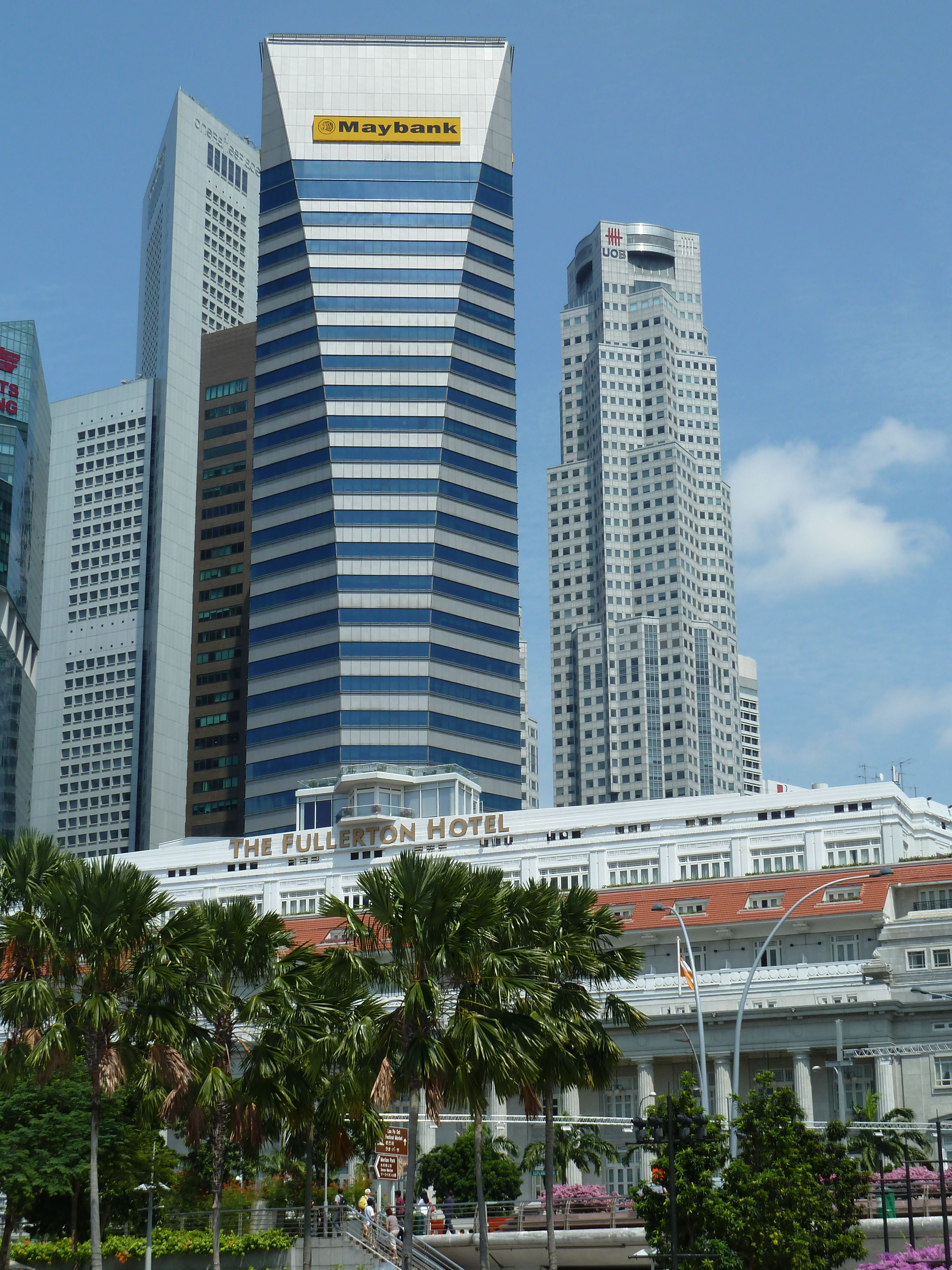
Maybank Tower, Singapore

== Awards and recognitions ==
From 2014 to 2018, Maybank was recognized as the most valuable bank brand in Malaysia for four consecutive years, according to the Brand Finance Banking 500 Brand Value Report 2018, published by the brand valuation consultancy Brand Finance.

Maybank was named the 'Best Malaysian Organisation' at the Life At Work Awards 2018, an initiative by Talent Corporation Malaysia Berhad (TalentCorp).

In January 2019, Maybank was included in Brand Finance's Global 500 Brands list, making it the only Malaysian bank and one of only two Malaysian brands to be featured that year. The bank achieved a brand valuation of US$4.2 billion, representing a 32% increase from its 2018 valuation of US$3.16 billion.

== See also ==
- List of largest Malaysian banks
- List of largest banks in Southeast Asia
