= Al Rajhi Grand Mosque =

One of the largest congregational mosques in Riyadh, Saudi Arabia

- Arabic: جامع الراجحي
- Al Rajhi Mosque, 2024

- Location of the mosque in Saudi Arabia

Religion
- Affiliation: Sunni Islam
- Ecclesiastical or organisational status: Mosque
- Status: Active

Location
- Location: Riyadh, Al-Sulay
- Country: Saudi Arabia
- Coordinates: 24°40′38″N 46°46′44″E

Architecture
- Type: Mosque architecture
- Style: Moorish Revival
- Founder: Sulaiman Al-Rajhi
- Funded by: Sulaiman Al-Rajhi
- Completed: September 26, 2004

Specifications
- Capacity: 20,000 worshippers
- Interior area: 13,260 m^{2} (142,700 sq ft)
- Dome: 1
- Dome height (outer): 37 m (121 ft)
- Dome dia. (outer): 28.8 m (94 ft)
- Minaret: 2
- Minaret height: 55 m (180 ft)
- Site area: 43,568 m^{2} (468,960 sq ft)

Sheikh Sulaiman Al-Rajhi Mosque (Arabic: جامع الشيخ سليمان الراجحي), better known as Al-Rajhi Grand Mosque (Arabic: جامع الراجحي), is a Sunni Islam Friday mosque in the al-Jazirah neighborhood of Riyadh, Saudi Arabia.

Opened in 2004, it incorporates elements of Andalusian Moorish Revival architecture and is one of the largest mosques in Riyadh besides being considered among the largest mosques in Saudi Arabia and the Arab world. It is named after the Saudi businessman and billionaire Sulaiman bin Abdulaziz Al-Rajhi, who primarily funded the mosque's construction.

== Overview ==
The construction of the mosque was financed by Saudi businessman Sulaiman bin Abdulaziz Al-Rajhi. The mosque was set to replace an old mosque of the same name situated in the east of al-Safa neighborhood since 1985.

The mosque is locally known for providing Islamic funerary services to the deceased, such as ritual baths and prayers, which was previously located in the al-Rabwah neighborhood.

The mosque was inaugurated on 26 September 2004 by the-then governor of Riyadh, Prince Salman bin Abdulaziz. Approximately two months after its inauguration, local street vendors had turned the mosque's eastern parking lot into an open-air marketplace, resulting in overcrowding and disorder. The local Al-Riyadh daily reported the issue and asked the city's municipal authorities to intervene in the matter.

The mosque's library was opened in 2005, which initially contained approximately 3,000 books, which by 2013, increased to around 16,000 books and 47,000 volumes.

The mosque hosted the funeral prayers of Saudi businessman and philanthropist Saleh bin Abdulaziz al-Rajhi, the founder of Al Rajhi Bank upon his death in 2011. In 2012, the mosque also hosted the funeral prayers of Mohamed bin Abdulaziz al-Rajhi, the brother to both Saleh and Sulaiman.

=== COVID-19 closure and reopening ===
In March 2020, the World Health Organization declared coronavirus a global pandemic. Weeks later, King Salman bin Abdulaziz announced a three-week nationwide curfew, barring all types of gatherings across Saudi Arabia. Al Rajhi Mosque subsequently was closed to worshippers until June 2020, when the Saudi government eased restrictions and worshippers were allowed in limited numbers provided that they maintain social distancing. In 2021, the Ministry of Islamic Affairs recognized Al Rajhi Mosque as one of the twelve mosques in Riyadh designated for Islamic funerary rituals in order to contain the spread of COVID-19 pandemic in the country.

== In popular culture ==
The mosque had a brief appearance in the 2023 Indian Hindi-language comedy drama film Dunki, incorrectly depicting it as part of the skyline of Jeddah.

== See also ==
- Islam in Saudi Arabia
- List of mosques in Saudi Arabia
