= Al-Rajhi =

Al-Rajhi (Arabic: الراجحي) may refer to:

== People ==
- Farhat Rajhi, Tunisian politician
- Saleh Abdul Aziz Al Rajhi, Saudi businessman
- Sulaiman Abdul Aziz Al Rajhi, Saudi businessman

== Other uses ==
- Sulaiman Al Rajhi Colleges., Saudi college
- Al-Rajhi Bank, Saudi bank
- Al Rajhi Tower, Proposed skyscraper in Riyadh, Saudi Arabia
