= Kurdish population of Nashville =

Ethnic group in Nashville, Tennessee

Kurds in Nashville
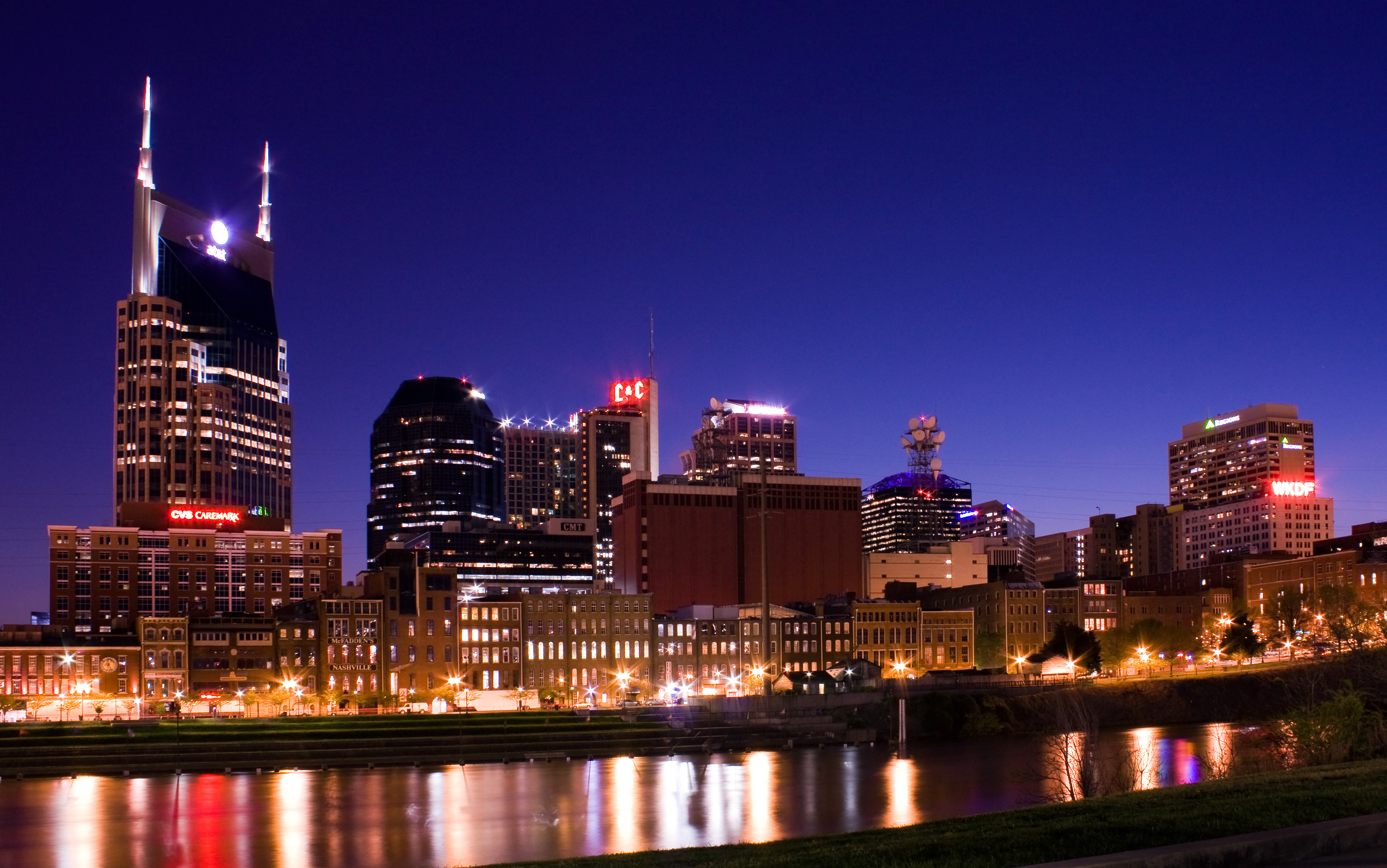
- Nashville, Tennessee

Total population
- 15,000–20,000 (2023)

Regions with significant populations
- United States, primarily Nashville, Tennessee

Languages
- Kurdish, Arabic, English

Religion
- Sunni Islam, Shi'a Islam, Alevi Islam, Yarsani, Judaism

Related ethnic groups
- Kurds (from Iraq, Syria, Turkey, Iran)

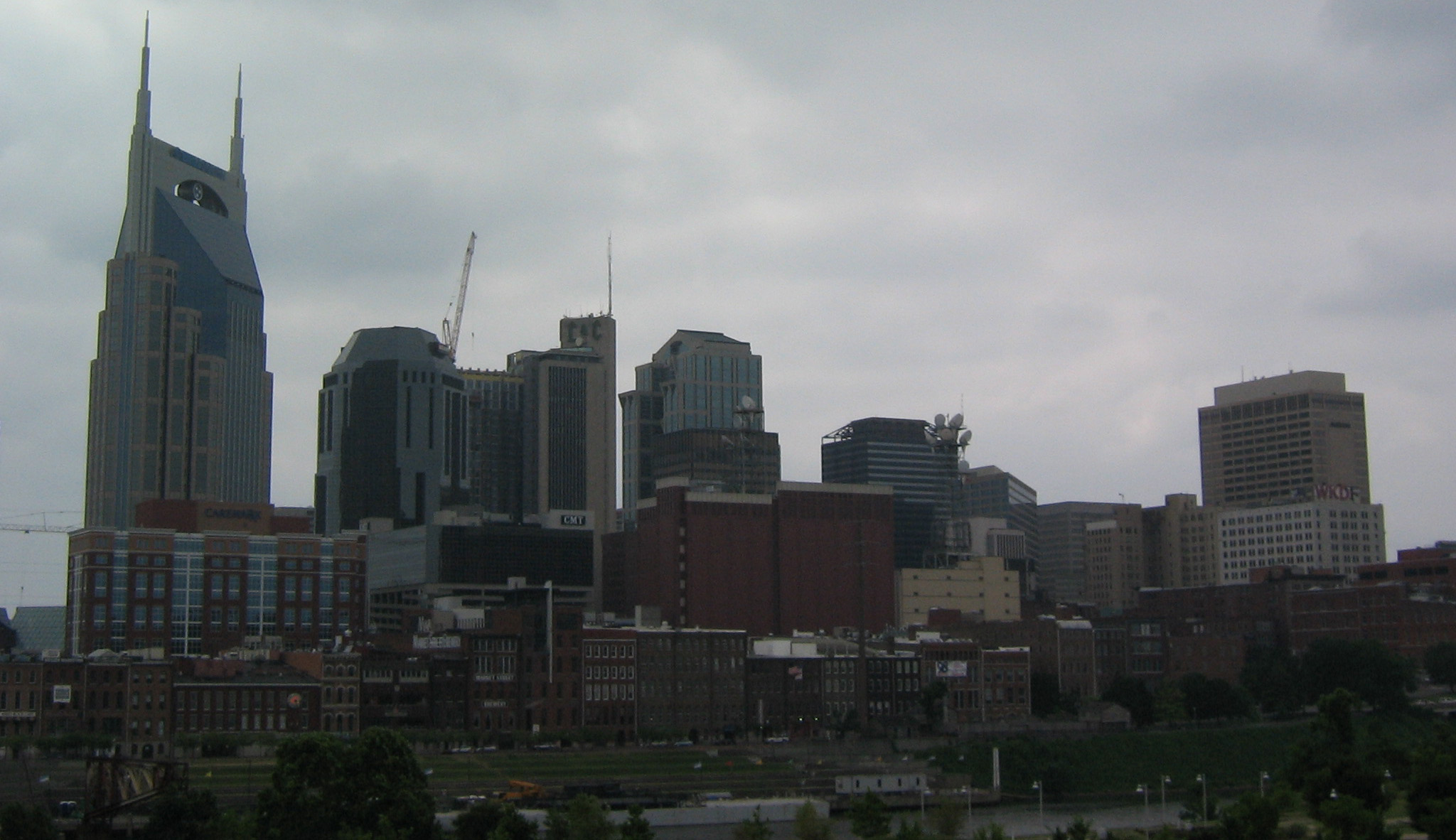
Nashville, Tennessee

The single largest community in the United States of ethnic Kurds exists in Nashville, Tennessee. This enclave is often called "Little Kurdistan" and is located in South Nashville. The majority of Nashville's "Little Kurdistan" comes from Iraqi Kurdistan, however there are sizeable communities of Kurds from Syria, Iran, and Turkey. It has been estimated that there are 15,000 Kurds living in Nashville, although more recent estimates place the number at around 20,000, the largest in the country.

== Population and demographics ==
It is estimated that there are 15,000 Kurds in Nashville. However, the US census does not take official data on the number of Kurds living in the United States. In the 1990s, the Office of Refugee Resettlement (ORR) fingered Nashville as a center of resettlement and issued them federal funding to resettle the Kurds who came to Nashville. Nashville has since become a hub of refugee resettlement for other communities as well.

== History ==
Following the breakup of the Ottoman Empire, the Kurdish people were separated into many nation-states. While Kurds are in Iran, Turkey, and Syria, the majority of Nashville's Kurdish population is Iraqi.

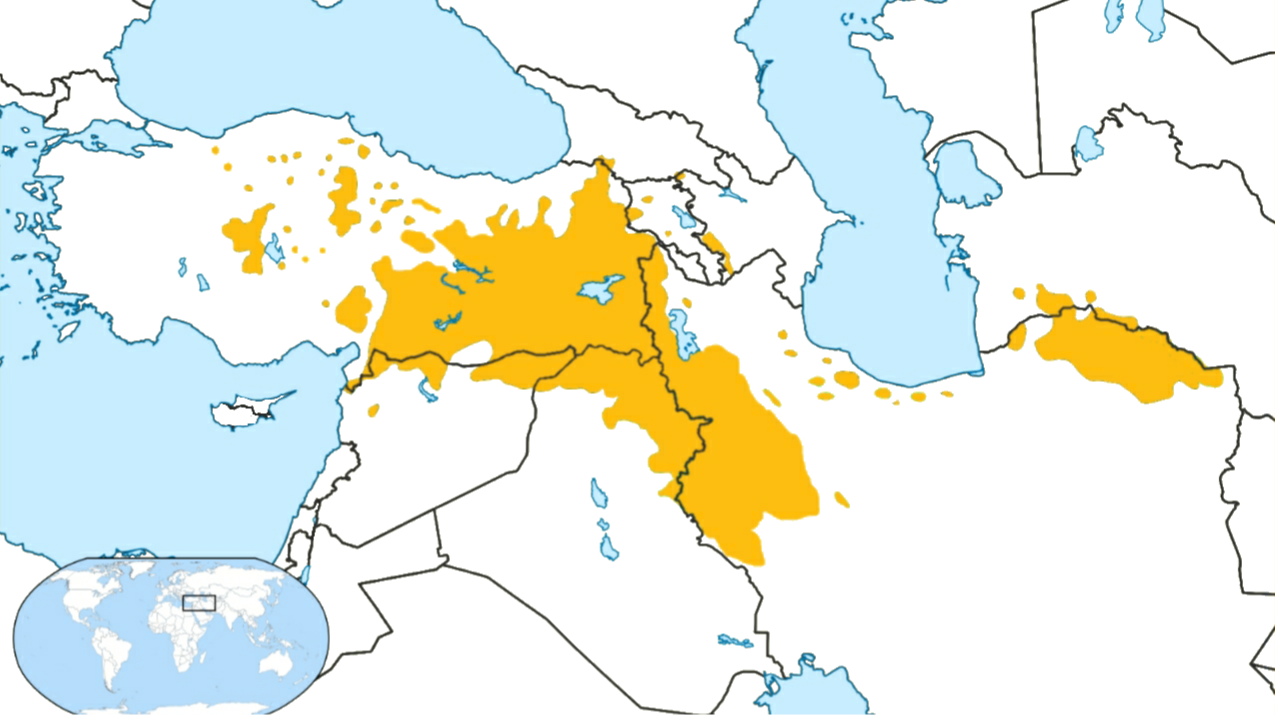
Distribution of Kurdish people in the Middle East

=== Iraq ===
The Kurdish portion of Iraq is oil-rich and much of the strife between the Iraqis and Kurds has been regarding this issue. This reached its epoch during Saddam Hussein's reign in the 1980s who started the Anfal campaign. Iraq began this campaign to stop the Iraqi Kurds from aiding Iran in a war between the countries. This, however, changed into a genocide which killed 50,000–100,000 Kurds. During this genocide, 3,000 to 4,000 Kurdish towns were destroyed, and 1.5 million Kurds were displaced. The American-led Gulf War restored peace to the Kurds after Resolution 688 of the UN established a no-fly zone. Moreover, the Gulf War, as covered by Western media outlets such as CNN, led to the "Kurdish Question" becoming a global issue. While the coverage was originally focused on the Iraqi treatment of the Kurds, CNN covered Turkish military's treatment as well which was negatively received.

=== Waves of immigration ===
The majority of Kurdish immigration happened following Saddam Hussein's genocide in the Anfal campaign. Somewhere between 750 and 3000 people came during this largest wave, likely at the lower end of that range. There were two other waves of Kurdish immigration to Nashville that preceded this were during the First and Second Iraqi-Kurdish conflicts in the 1970s.

== Culture ==
=== Little Kurdistan ===
Little Kurdistan is located in the south of Nashville. Unlike other enclaves in major cities like Chinatown or Little Italy, Little Kurdistan is centered around a strip mall, a mosque, and a few stores. While small, the Kurds of Nashville are hoping to create a semblance of their home country in the United States.

=== Religion ===
Many Kurds are Sunni Muslims, but they are not a religious monolith. There are a number of Kurds who are Shi'a Muslim, Alevi Muslim, Jewish, and Yarsani. In Nashville, the Salahadeen Center of Nashville is the hub of religious life for many of the Kurds living in Little Kurdistan.

=== Politics ===
==== Domestic ====
Despite holding a strong minority in the city, the Kurds of Nashville do not hold prominent political office; however, the director of the Salahadeen Center, Nawzad Hawrami, is on Nashville's New American Advisory Council, which informs Nashville's local government of pressing issues regarding refugees and immigrants in the city. Moreover, historically, the Kurds in Nashville have been long time Republican voters and proponents of American foreign policy.

==== International ====
Nashville is designated as one of the few international locations where Kurds can cast their ballots in Iraqi elections. In 2005, Kurds were able to vote in democratic elections for Iraq as long as they were able to prove Iraqi citizenship and US residency. Prior to the vote for the independence of Kurdistan, many Kurds protested in downtown Nashville against the Iraqi government and advocated for a Kurdish nation-state.

== Controversy ==
=== Gang violence ===
In the late 1990s and early 2000s, a Kurdish gang—Kurdish Pride Gang—formed. By 2006, the Nashville police had designated 24 individuals as members and many arrests were made for their violence. However, the Kurdish community strongly rebuked the gang and urged for peace led by leaders in the community including a college professor and Nawzad Hawrami, the director of the Salahadeen Center. These actions in conjunction with anti-gang related policing in 2012 disrupted Kurdish Pride. While it was believed that the gang activity lessened following these actions, in 2018, the first Kurdish police officer was arrested for allegedly being a part of Kurdish Pride. Metro Police have not given numbers at how many members still exist.

=== The withdrawal of troops from Kurdistan ===
On October 6, 2019, Recep Tayyip Erdoğan, President of Turkey, informed the US that the Turkish army would be invading Northeast Syria, where many Kurds live. The next day President Donald Trump announced plans to remove troops from the regime which left the Kurds at risk to Turkish aggression. The US House of Representatives in a bipartisan show of support to the Kurds condemned President Trump's actions.

In Nashville, hundreds of Nashville's Kurdish population protested downtown against President Trump's action. They were joined in protest by Democratic Congressperson Jim Cooper. Both of Tennessee's Republican senators also rebuked President Trump's withdrawal.

== See also ==
- Kurdish Americans
- Kurdish American Caucus
