= Talat Othman =

American businessman (born 1936)

Talat M. Othman (born April 27, 1936, in Beitunia, Palestine) is a Palestinian-American businessman and investor. He is the president of Grove Financial, Inc. and the founding president of the Arab-American Business and Professional Association. In 1973, he founded the Midwest Chapter of the Forex Association of North America. He serves as senior advisor of McKinley Reserve. On July 31, 2000, he opened the Republican National Convention session with a dua'a – or Muslim benediction – marking the first time a Muslim had addressed a major US political gathering. Illinois governor Jim Edgar proclaimed Nov 1, 1997 Haj Talat M. Othman day in Illinois. On April 4, 2002, Othman joined Islamic Institute head Khaled Saffuri in a meeting with Treasury Secretary Paul O'Neill (arranged by Grover Norquist) as representatives of the Muslim-American community, to voice complaints about the March 20 raid on the International Institute of Islamic Thought and 19 related entities.

In 2006, Othman received an honorary doctorate degree in humane letters from Catholic Theological Union.

== Career synopsis ==
In 1947, Othman emigrated to the United States with his family. From 1956 to 1977, Othman served as an executive in the International Banking Department at Harris Trust and Savings Bank in Chicago, Illinois, as vice president and division administrator of the International Money Management Division, including the International Economic Research Unit. From 1978 to 1983, Othman was general manager and chief executive officer of the Saudi Arab Finance Corporation, Luxembourg, and general manager of the Saudi Investment Group, Jeddah, Saudi Arabia. From 1983 to 1995, he served as chairman and chief executive officer of Dearborn Financial Inc., Arlington Heights, Illinois. In 1987, he joined the board of Harken Energy to represent the interests of Abdullah Taha Bakhsh. Served as chair of the three member Audit Committee of which George W. Bush was a member. In 1990, he was among 15 Arab-Americans invited to the White House after Saddam Hussein's invasion of Kuwait.

In 1995, Othman established Grove Financial, Inc. of Chicago and currently serves as its chairman and CEO. It is an international investment management firm located in Long Grove, Illinois, specializing in managing investment funds and U.S.-Middle East business. He opened the July 31, 2000 session of the RNC with a Muslim benediction.

Othman is president of Crescent Capital Management, LLC. Chicago, Illinois, and chairman of the board of trustees of Amana Mutual Funds, Bellingham, Washington.

== Other affiliations ==
He is on the board of Bank One Wisconsin Corp, Dansk International Designs, Hartmarx Corp, Tejas Power Corp, PathoGenesis Corp, and Amana Mutual Funds Trust. He is advisory board member of St. Jude Children's Research Hospital. He is on the Dean's Council of Advisors of Harvard Kennedy School. He is a member of the Chicago Council on Foreign Relations Independent Task Force. He is a board member of the Middle East Policy Council. He is the founding chairman of the American Muslim Council.

He is chairman of the Islamic Free Market Institute founded by Khaled Saffuri.

Othman served on the board of trustees for the Illinois State Universities Retirement System and the Illinois State Finance Authority. Othman is a former board member of the Illinois Finance Authority.
