= Shah Abdul Hannan =

Bangladeshi economist (1939–2021)

- শাহ আবদুল হান্নান
- Born: 23 September 1939; Kurikhai, Kishoreganj, Bengal Presidency
- Died: 2 June 2021 (aged 82); Ibn Sina Hospital, Dhaka, Bangladesh

Philosophical work
- Era: 1963-2021
- Main interests: Islamic economy, Islamic culture, Islamic banking
- Website: shahfoundationbd.org/hannan

Shah Abdul Hannan (Bengali: শাহ আবদুল হান্নান; 23 September 1939 – 2 June 2021) was a Bangladeshi Islamic philosopher, writer, economist, educator and media personality. He served as the deputy governor of the Bangladesh Bank and chairman of the National Board of Revenue. He was the founding vice chancellor of Darul Ihsan University, North South University, chairman of the Islamic Economics Research Bureau, and the director of Islami Bank Bangladesh Ltd.

== Early life and education ==
Abdul Hannan was born on 23 September 1939 to a Bengali Muslim family in Kurikhai, Kishoreganj subdivision, Mymensingh district, Bengal Presidency. He completed his Bachelor of Economics and Political Science in 1959 and his Master of Political Science in 1961 from the University of Dacca. After completing his studies he joined the then Pakistan Civil Service.

== Career ==
=== Government service ===
Shah Abdul Hannan started his professional life as a lecturer of political science in a college in Dhaka. He joined Pakistan Finance Service in 1963 and retired as the secretary of the government of Bangladesh in 1998. He served the government of Bangladesh as:

- Chairman, National Board of Revenue, where he pioneered the introduction of VAT (Value Added Tax) in Bangladesh;
- Deputy Governor of Bangladesh Bank;
- Director General, Bureau of Anti-corruption;
- Secretary, Ministry of Social Welfare;
- Secretary, Internal Resources Division, Ministry of Finance.

=== Educator ===
Hannan was one of the founding members of the North South University, Asian University of Bangladesh, and Darul Ihsan University. He also served as the chairman of the Institute of Research and Development (IRD), International Islamic University, Chittagong and a syndicate member of Manarat International University.

He has lectured for YouTube videos and indoor classes on a wide range of issues, including women's rights, human rights, contemporary issues and Islamic solutions, Usul al fiqh, and Islamic economics.

=== Economist ===
As an economist, Shah Abdul Hannan served as:

- Co-founder, Islamic Economics Research Bureau
- Co-founder, Bangladesh Institute of Islamic Thought
- Member, Editorial Board, The Daily Arthanitee
- Chief Advisor, Islamic Insurance Co. Bangladesh
- Chairman, Islamic Banks' Consultative Forum (IBCF)
- Founder member, Central Shariah Board of Islamic Banks
- Chairman of Islami Bank Bangladesh Ltd

=== Social work ===
- Chairman, Ibn Sina Trust
- Chairman, Manarat Dhaka International School and College
- Member, Association of Correction and Social Reclamation, Bangladesh (ACSRB)

=== Media personality ===
Shah Hannan regularly attended media programs of channels NTV, ATN Bangla, RTV and Islamic TV.

== Works ==
Books written by Shah Abdul Hannan:

- Islami Ortthonitite Shorker er Vumika (1985)
- Islami Orthoniti: Dorshon O Kormokoushol (2002)
- Nari Shomossa o Islam (1988)
- Nari O Bastobota (2002)
- Social Laws of Islam (1995)
- Desh Shomaj O Rajniti (2003)
- Bishoy Chinta
- Soviet Union e Islam (1976)
- Usul-al-Fiqh (2000)
- Law Economics and History (2003)
- Islam and Gender: The Bangladesh Perspective (2016)

== Personal life ==
He had two children, Samina Akhter and Shah Mustafa Faisal.

== Death ==
Hannan died at Ibn Sina Hospital on 2 June 2021, at the age of 82. He has been undergoing treatment since 8 May for geriatric illness; during this time he suffered multiple heart attacks, and lost his memory due to inflammation in the brain. Per Islamic tradition, he was given Salat al-Janazah funeral prayers: one was held at Dhanmondi Shahi Eidgah, another was in front of his house, and a third was at the Baitul Mukarram National Mosque. He was buried at Shahjahanpur Cemetery in Dhaka.
