= BIIT =

BIIT may refer to:

- Bangladesh Institute of Islamic Thought, a think-tank in Bangladesh
- Barani Institute of Information Technology, an institution in Pakistan
