= Naif Saleh Alrajhi =

Saudi entrepreneur, investor, philanthropist and businessman

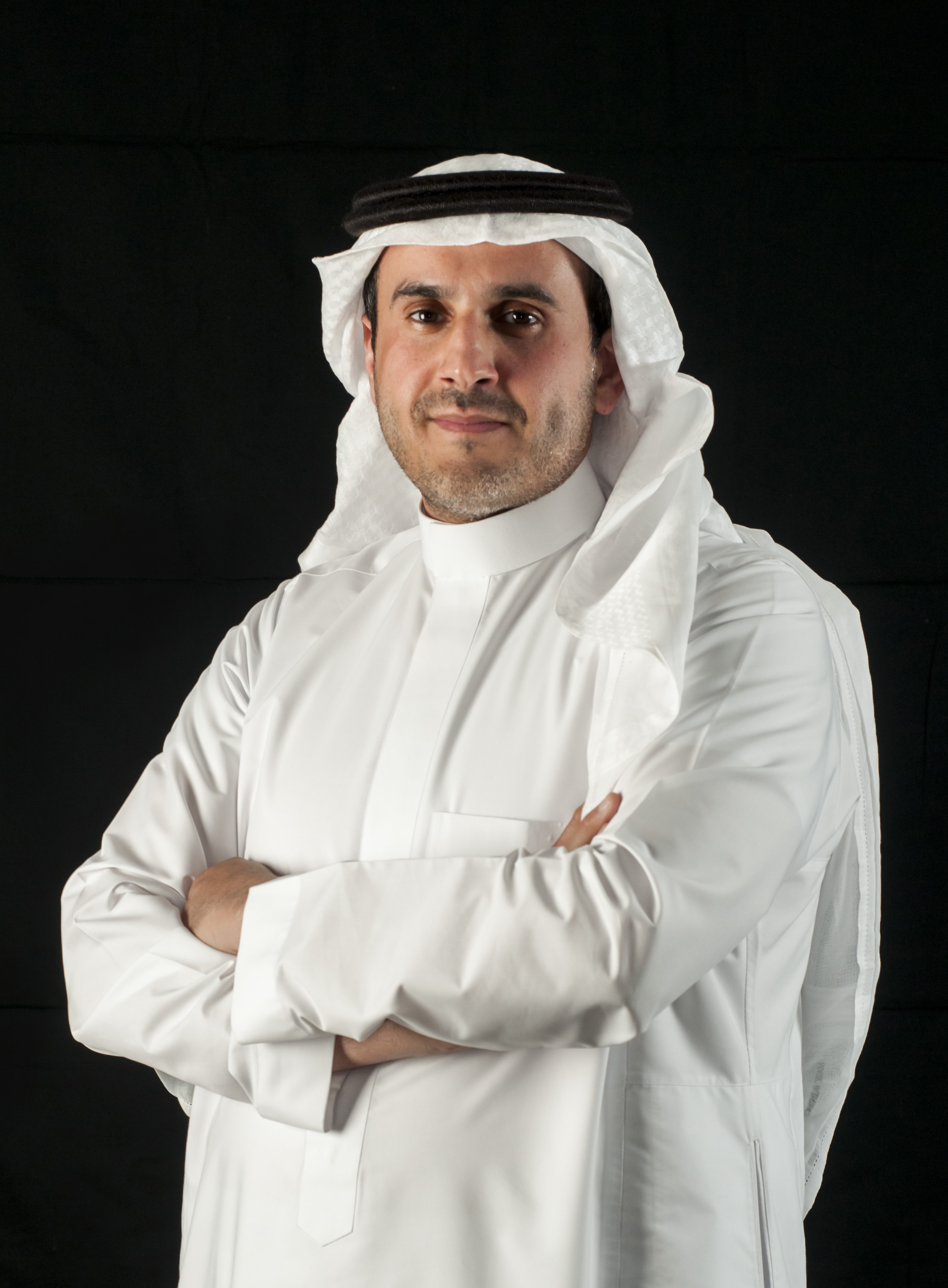
- Born: Saudi Arabia
- Occupation: Investor – entrepreneur – philanthropist
- Title: Founder, Chairman, and CEO of Naif Alrajhi Investment Vice Chairman of Gulf Training and Education Company Board Member of Sinad Holding Company
- Father: Saleh Abdul Aziz Al Rajhi
- Family: Al Rajhi Family
- Awards: International Finance Awards (2019); Arabian Business's Top 50 Most Influential Personalities (2021); Arabian Business's Top 150 Most Influential Arabs (2025)

Naif Saleh Abdulaziz Alrajhi (Arabic: نايف صالح الراجحي), a Saudi entrepreneur, investor, philanthropist and businessman. He is the founder and CEO of Naif Alrajhi Investment, Vice Chairman of the Board of Directors at Memar Investment & Real Estate Development Company, Vice Chairman of the Board of Directors at Gulf Training & Education Company, and Board Member at Sinad Holding Company.

In 2001, Naif Alrajhi launched his career in commerce. In 2003, he began working in real estate development. He developed several projects and residential towers like "The Time Place", the first towers in Dubai Marina.

In 2011, he launched the first real estate fund in Saudi Arabia, and in 2015, a closed fund was introduced with Riyad Capital named Riyadh Real Estate Income Fund which was listed as the first REIT fund in the Saudi Stock Exchange.

In 2019, He was awarded the "Most Innovative Diversified Investment Portfolio" at the International Finance Awards 2019, he was listed in Top 50 Most Influential 2021 by Arabian Business, and Forbes "Top 100 Arab Family Businesses in the Middle East".

== Career ==
Naif Saleh Abdulaziz Alrajhi was born in Riyadh, Saudi Arabia. In 2001, he launched his career in commerce, while in 2003, he began working in real estate development. He developed several projects and residential towers, including the "Time Place Tower," among the first towers in Dubai Marina.

In 2007, he founded Memar Investment & Real Estate Development Company, which developed and implemented many residential and hospitality projects. Later, in 2011, he launched the first real estate fund of its kind in Saudi Arabia, which was issued to the public. In 2015, a closed fund was introduced with Riyad Capital, named Riyadh Real Estate Income Fund, and in 2017 it was listed as the first REIT fund in the Saudi Stock Exchange.

He currently heads Naif Alrajhi Investment Company, which he founded in 2012, headquartered in Riyadh and with offices in London and Dubai. The company boasts diverse and risk-managed investments, including more than 350 investments across 30 companies in 14 sectors. The company also invests in capital and property markets.

Since 2012, Naif Al Rajhi Investment has established partnerships with many renowned companies, including Awfa Investment, Ramla Real Estate Development, Memar Development & Investment, United Technology Construction (UTC), Golden Compass, Bohour International Investment, and Phi Advertising.

== Awards and achievements ==
In 2019, He was awarded the "Most Innovative Diversified Investment Portfolio" at the International Finance Awards 2019 and was listed in the Top 50 Most Influential in Saudi Arabia 2021 by Arabian Business, and he was featured in Forbes's list "Top 100 Arab Family Businesses in the Middle East". Naif AlRajhi was selected among the "Top 150 Most Influential Arabs for 2025" by Arabian Business.

== Philanthropy ==
In 2014, Alraji made a sponsorship agreement with "Tasamy for Impact", an initiative that was established by Princess Ameera al-Taweel for enabling sustainable and innovative solutions to societal problems.

Since 2018, he has launched an annual blood donation campaign in collaboration with the Central Blood Bank and King Faisal Specialist Hospital. In 2019, his company launched an initiative to provide necessary equipment for the visually impaired and offer assistance to those in need. Additionally, Feyan, the community service arm of Naif Alrajhi Investment, launched the "Nora Tree Planting" initiative to support the Saudi Green Cause, in collaboration with the Green Horizons Environmental Association.

== Personal life ==
He belongs to the Al Rajhi family, who are considered one of the wealthiest non-royal families in Saudi Arabia. His father was Saleh Abdulaziz Alrajhi, co-founder of Al-Rajhi Bank and many prominent industrial companies in Saudi Arabia.
