= Operation Green Quest =

2001–03 US effort against terrorist financing

Operation Green Quest was a U.S. interagency investigative unit formed in October 2001 after the September 11 attacks. Sponsored by the United States Customs Service, it was concerned with the surveillance and stemming of terrorist financing sources.

While it reportedly achieved some successes in terms of recovery of smuggled currency and assets, the operation was ultimately criticized for targeting a number of respected Muslim community leaders and rarely making a connection to terrorist activities. A lack of coordination between the Federal Bureau of Investigation (FBI) and the U.S. Immigration and Customs Enforcement (ICE), and disputes over each agency's jurisdiction, led to the program's disbandment in June 2003.

== History ==
On 25 October 2001, in the wake of the 9/11 attacks, President George W. Bush’s administration announced the establishment of “a new multi-agency financial enforcement initiative”. The investigative unit, called "Operation Green Quest," was intended to play a coordinating role – sharing leads, exchanging data, and preventing the duplication of field investigations – between a number of government agencies with financial expertise, in order to track and disrupt the sources of terrorist financing.

Led by the U.S. Customs Service, this initiative brought together agents and analysts from the Federal Bureau of Investigation (FBI), the Internal Revenue Service (IRS), the U.S. Secret Service, the Office of Foreign Assets Control (OFAC), the Financial Crimes Enforcement Network (FinCen), the Bureau of Alcohol, Tobacco and Firearms (ATF), the U.S. Postal Inspection Service, and the Naval Criminal Investigative Service. The operation was also supported by the Customs Money Laundering Coordination Center.

The director of Operation Green Quest was a senior special agent from U.S. Customs and the deputy director is a senior special agent from the IRS. A senior FBI official was also posted to the unit, as well as two federal prosecutors from the U.S. Justice Department's Criminal Division. At launch, the unit consisted of close to 30 special agents and analysts from the participating agencies. By January 2003, personnel numbered 300 agents.

== March 2002 raids ==
Operation Green Quest's most high-profile operation was a raid carried out on March 20-21, 2002, against 19 Muslim charities and foundations in Herndon, VA. Customs officials at the time described it as the largest action undertaken by the operation in the year following 9/11.

U.S. customs agents with federal search warrants reportedly confiscated around 500 boxes of paper and 80 computers, but no criminal charges ensued, no financial assets were frozen, no organizations were shut down, and no links to terrorism were found. A number of indictments were raised against alleged Iraqi and Yemeni hawala money-laundering rings in Seattle and New York City, but it was unclear whether these were linked to terrorist financing or if they were simply networks of Middle Eastern immigrants sending money home to their families.

The raid was described as having targeted the homes and offices of “some of the region's most respected Muslim leaders”, and was denounced by the Muslim community and by civil rights groups. A 2003 report by the U.S. Commission on Civil Rights described the raids as having frightened and angered the Muslim community, “as agents broke down doors, handcuffed people, and seized personal property ranging from computers to children's toys.”

It gave rise to concerns of unfair persecution. Two weeks later, on April 4, 2002, a delegation of notable GOP-affiliated Muslim figures, including Palestinian-American financier and Republican organizer Talat M. Othman and Islamic Institute head Khaled Saffuri, was received by Treasury Secretary Paul O'Neill as representatives of the Muslim-American community to voice complaints about the raid.

== Disbandment ==
The conflicts between the FBI and U.S. Immigration and Customs Enforcement (the successor agency to U.S. Customs) over jurisdiction were well-documented. FBI officials were said to deride Green Quest agents as "cowboys" whose actions were undermining more important, long-term FBI investigations. In turn, Green Quest sources allegedly accused the FBI of jealousy.

As a result, the Attorney General and the Secretary of Homeland Security signed in May 2003 an agreement concerning terrorist financing investigations. In it, DHS acknowledged that the Department of Justice, through the FBI, was the lead agency in the fight against terrorist financing, and that any terrorist financing investigations would have to be conducted under the auspices of the FBI-led Joint Terrorism Task Force. DHS also agreed to disband Operation Green Quest by June of that year, and not to start any investigations into terrorism or terrorist financing without the permission of the FBI.

== Legacy ==
The legacy of Operation Green Quest is the subject of some debate. A report by the U.S. Office of the Inspector General in 2007 described its actions as having been “very successful,” on account of having opened 2,000 cases, resulting in 79 arrests, 70 indictments, and seizures of $33 million in its first year and a half.

The same report revealed that investigations had rarely developed into terrorist financing cases, according to a memo from 25 June 2003, authored by the Deputy Assistant Director for Financial Programs at ICE. Only 9 of the 2,000 cases had been found to have a terrorist connection, and only 2 were ever referred to the FBI’s Joint Terrorism Task Forces (JTTFs).

The American Civil Liberties Union (ACLU) criticized the operation at the time for its alleged lack of accountability and redress of their operations. ACLU declared that organizations which were flagged as having any kind of connection to terrorism, no matter how tenuous, were investigated in secret and were never given any opportunity to clear their name.

Operation Green Quest also reportedly angered the Muslim community in the United States. The organizations and leaders targeted in the raid – some of whom had been publicly supportive of the administration’s actions post-9/11 – were widely regarded as moderate and progressive voices in American Islam, whose reputations were tarnished as a result of the raid.

In a 2004 study of the March raids, Professor John G. Douglass contended that the raids were reflective of a political agenda, intending to send a message to the American Muslim population. “As a practical matter,” he wrote, “the government has publicly identified the targeted religious organizations as aiders and abettors to terrorism, while avoiding any responsibility for proving the charge.”

== See also ==
- International Institute of Islamic Thought, one of the more notable targets of the March 20 raid.
- September 11 attacks
