= Mahmoud Abu-Saud =

American economist

Mahmoud Abu-Saud (1911 – April 24, 1993), was an economist, author, religious scholar and activist. A specialist in central banking, he was instrumental in establishing central banks and currency regulation in a number of countries including Kuwait and Afghanistan. He was a co-founder of the American Muslim Council.

== Life ==
Abu-Saud was born in 1911 in Sudan to Egyptian parents. He later lived in Panama City, Florida. He died of a heart attack on April 24, 1993, in Birmingham while on a speaking tour in England.

== Work ==
Professor Abu Saud was a prominent figure and contributor to the seminars and conferences of the Association of Muslim Social Scientists (AMSS), the International Institute of Islamic Thought and the Islamic Society of North America for several years.

== Writings ==
- Sex Roles in Muslim Families in the US, privately published, 1979
- Money, Interest and Qirad, Studies in Islamic Economics, Ed. Khurshid Ahmad, The Islamic Foundation, Leicester, 1980, ISBN 0-86037-067-4
- Concept of Islam, American Trust Publications, 1983, ISBN 0-89259-043-2
- Contemporary Economic Issues: Usury and Interest, International Islamic Federation of Student Organizations, Kuwait, 1984
- Contemporary Zakat, Zakat and Research Foundation, Ohio, 1988
- The Methodology of the Islamic Behavioral Sciences, American Journal of Islamic Social Sciences, Vol 10, No 3, Fall 1993, ISSN 0742-6763
