= Amana Mutual Funds Trust =

American mutual fund company

Amana Mutual Funds Trust (Ticker symbols: AMANX, AMAGX, and AMDWX), headquartered in Bellingham, Washington, is a mutual fund company offering investment products consistent with Islamic banking principles.

== Founding principles ==
The Amana Income Fund, founded by Unified Management Corporation, Indianapolis, IN, in 1986, was the Trust's first fund. The Amana Growth Fund was created in 1994. The Amana Developing World Fund was created in 2009. All three funds are managed according to Islamic principles.

Traditional mutual funds are off-limits to Muslims, because they typically contain securities that are forbidden by sharia law. Accordingly, the Amana Funds are managed under strict guidelines to comply with Islamic principles. Examples of forbidden (haram) investments are companies that:

- Produce or sell alcohol, tobacco or pornography
- Process or sell pork products
- Generate revenue from gambling or interest (riba)
- Maintain a debt ratio of greater than one-third of assets

The funds were created and are still managed under the value investment style. Nicholas Kaiser has been portfolio manager of the funds since 1990. Scott Klimo is the deputy portfolio manager of the funds.

The Amana Funds are unique in that they were specifically conceived to meet the needs of Muslim investors. One of the reasons Muslims are motivated to save and invest is to make financial preparations necessary to make the Hajj, a sacred form of a self-presentation before God (Allah in Arabic) that is considered within Islam to be one of life's primary duties. In order to make the Hajj, a Muslim must first get his financial house in order, which presents special challenges if the money is to be invested in compliance Shari'ah-oriented financial principles. According to Amana's founding chairman Dr. M. Yaqub Mirza,

In order to make the Hajj, Muslims must first pay off their debts, including the zakat due on their wealth; to return whatever was given them in trust; and have enough savings to bear the expenses of the journey (such as travel, Hajj tax, and lodging) and the sacrifice (of an animal). Besides this, they also have to provide for their families and dependents during their absence. They must have earned and saved enough to cover these expenses. No Hajj is valid if it is performed "on credit."

== Performance ==
Performance of the Amana Funds is best evaluated by consulting a variety of sources. The ticker symbols for the funds are:

- The Amana Income Fund: AMANX (Inception: June 23, 1986)
- The Amana Growth Fund: AMAGX (Inception: Feb. 3, 1994)
- The Amana Developing World Fund: AMDWX (Inception: Sept. 28, 2009)

== Organization and structure ==
Saturna Capital Corporation is the investment adviser and administrator of the Amana Mutual Funds Trust and the Saturna Investment Trust. Saturna Capital Corporation, established in 1989, is administrator to $3.8 billion in assets under management as of September 2012.

Saturna Sdn. Bhd., located in Kuala Lumpur, Malaysia is a wholly owned subsidiary of Saturna Capital Corporation.

Saturna Brokerage Services is the distributor of the Amana Funds Trust and is a wholly owned subsidiary of Saturna Capital Corporation.

Saturna Trust Company, headquartered in Reno, NV is a wholly owned subsidiary of Saturna Capital Corporation.

== Board of Trustees and Officers ==
Independent Trustees:

- Talat M. Othman, Chairperson (since 2001)
- Iqbal Unus, Ph.D. (since 1989)
- Miles Davis, Ph.D. (since 2008)
- M. Yaqub Mirza, Ph.D. (since 2009, also 1987 to 2003)
- Ronald H. Fielding, MA, MBA, CFA (since 2012)

Interested Trustee:

- Nicholas F. Kaiser, CFA, Trustee (since 1989)

Officers who are not trustees:

- Jane Carten, MBA, Vice President (since 2012)
- Christopher R. Fankhauser, Treasurer (since 2002)
- Ethel B. Bartholome, Secretary (since 2003)

== History ==
The concept for the Amana Funds emerged in 1984 when two members of the North American Islamic Trust, Yaqub Mirza and Bassam Osman, presented the idea of a mutual fund for Muslim investors to Nicholas Kaiser, who was then portfolio manager of multiple mutual funds at Unified Management Corporation, based in Indianapolis, Indiana.

== Portfolio Managers ==
The Amana Funds' portfolios have been managed since 1989 by Nicholas Kaiser, MBA, CFA, (Chairman and controlling shareowner of the Amana Funds’ Adviser, Saturna Capital Corporation). Mr. Kaiser founded Saturna Capital in 1989 after selling his controlling interest in Unified Management Corporation. His educational background includes an economics degree from Yale College and a master's degree in business administration from the University of Chicago (1968) with dual majors in economics and finance. Scott Klimo, CFA, has been the deputy portfolio manager of the Amana Funds since 2012. Mr. Klimo joined Saturna Capital, adviser to the Amana Funds, as director of research in 2012. He holds a BA in Asian Studies from Hamilton College, Clinton, NY, and attended the Chinese University of Hong Kong and the Mandarin Training Center, Taipei, Taiwan.

== Alumni ==
Amana's past board membership has included the following interesting individuals:

- Yaqub Mirza, co-founder, trustee 1986–2003.
- Jamal M. Barzinji, trustee, 1984–2001.
- Abdul Wahab, trustee, 2005–2012.
- Abid Malik, trustee, 2006–2012.
- Herbert Grubel, Ph.D., trustee, 2008–2012.
- Salim Manzar, trustee, 2008–2012.
- Monem Salam, MBA, vice president, 2003–2012, deputy portfolio manager, 2008–2012.
- James D. Winship, JD, MBA, chief compliance officer, 2004-2012
