= SAAR Foundation =

The SAAR Foundation was a flagship corporation representing charities, think tanks, and business entities. SAAR was named after its founder, Saudi patriarch Sulaiman Abdul Aziz Al Rajhi, a man close to the Saudi ruling family and on the Golden Chain, a list of early al-Qaeda supporters. SAAR is alternatively referred to as the Safa Group. The SAAR Foundation, which was dissolved in December 2000, achieved prominence as the key subject of a March 20, 2002, raid by federal agents, as a part of Operation Green Quest. The raid was carried out over suspicions by the U.S. Treasury Department that the group was laundering money for Al Qaeda or other terrorist groups. In 2003, they were accused of large scale money laundering for terrorist entities.

== Background ==
The Foundation's overseas origins date to the 1970s. The origins began with a group of Muslim scholars, businessmen, and scientists from the Middle East and Asia who moved to the U.S. in the 1980s. The network began with the incorporation of the SAAR Foundation, Inc., in Herndon, Virginia, as a 501(c)(3) non-profit in July 1983. The parent corporation dissolved in 2000 and was replaced by the Safa Trust, which was run by many of the same group of individuals. SAAR was named after the patriarch of the wealthy Saudi Arabian al-Rajhi family, who are also the foundation's largest donors.

Federal investigations allege that SAAR makes up a network of up to one hundred non-profit and for-profit organizations with known ties to radical Islamist groups. Many of these organizations shared the same address in Virginia, which led investigators to claim that many of the organizations were "phantom" entities engaged in reverse money-laundering. Special Agent David Kane of the Bureau of Immigration and Customs Enforcement testified in a 2003 affidavit that the most likely cause for the group's presence was "to conceal support for terrorism". Seventy percent of the contributions to SAAR charities came from within the SAAR network. Millions of dollars ended up in an offshore bank account in the Bahamas and the Isle of Man making them difficult to trace. Traced funds arrived at financial institutions designated by the U.S. Treasury as financial conduits for terrorist groups like Al Taqwa Bank and Akida Bank Private, LTD. Other funds were traced to a group, WISE, linked to the organization Palestinian Islamic Jihad.

In the years that followed the investigation, SAAR was fined "more than $500,000" for contempt of court for failing to turn over documents subpoenaed by the grand jury investigation. The fines have not been paid, however, because the SAAR Foundation no longer has assets in its name in the U.S.

== Federal investigation ==
As part of Operation Green Quest, a multiagency task force led by the U.S. Customs and U.S. Customs and Immigration Enforcement, SAAR was investigated in an investigation into suspected terror financing entities. Their mission was focused on closing down illicit financial systems and repairing vulnerable and legitimate systems that could be used to raise funds for terrorists. On March 20, 2002, federal agents raided 14 interlocking business entities in Herndon, Virginia, associated with the SAAR Foundation looking for ties to the Al Taqwa Bank and the Muslim Brotherhood. Over 500 boxes of files and computer files were confiscated, filling seven trucks. Investigations from Operation Green Quest led to seventy indictments and $33 million in seized funds by 2003.

== Notable personnel ==
- Yaqub Mirza, chief executive (1984-2002)
- Mohamed Hadid, Wealthy business man who partnered with the Foundation to fund real estate developments in the U.S.
