= Sinaiyah al-Jadidah (Riyadh) =

Industrial district in Riyadh, Saudi Arabia

Sinaiyah al-Jadidah الصناعية الجديدة
- Industrial district/Neighborhood
- Second Industrial City
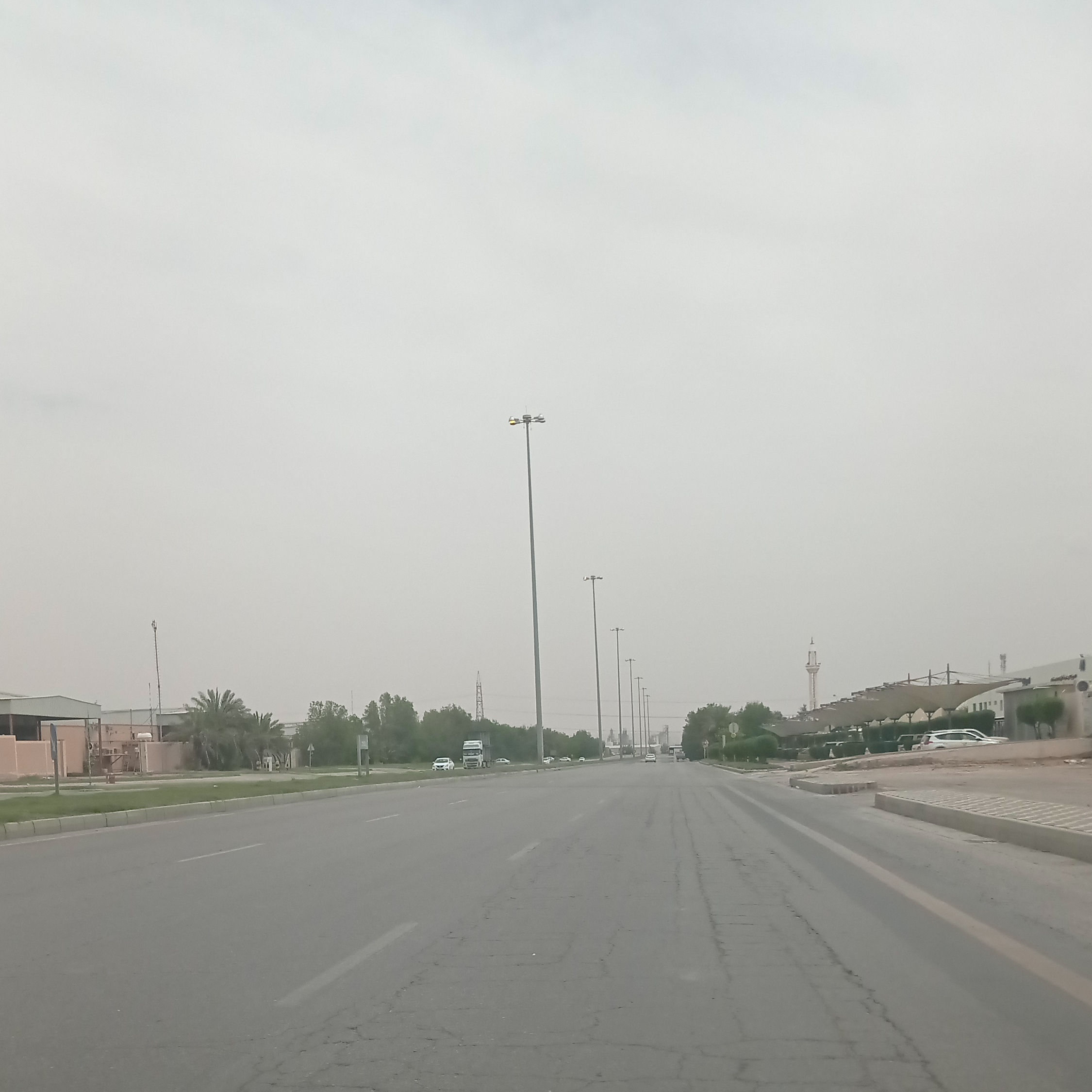
- New Industrial City, 2023

- Location within Saudi Arabia Location within Asia
- Coordinates: 24°32′40″N 46°53′53″E
- Country: Saudi Arabia
- City: Riyadh
- Established: 1976

Government
  - Body: Al Sulay Sub-Municipality

Area
  - Total: 1,900 ha (4,700 acres)

Language
  - Official: Arabic

Sinaiyah al-Jadidah (Arabic: مدينة الصناعية الجديدة, lit. 'New Industrial City'), officially Second Industrial City (Arabic: المدينة الصناعية الثانية), is an industrial district in eastern-southernmost Riyadh, Saudi Arabia, located east of al-Misfat and south of Iskan along the al-Kharj Road in the sub-municipality of al-Sulay. It was established in 1976 during the reign of King Khalid bin Abdulaziz as part of the second national five-year development plan of 1975–1980. It assumed its current name around 1984 and covers an area of 4700 acres. It is overseen by the Saudi Authority for Industrial Cities and Technology Zones (MODON).
