= Manarat Dhaka International School and College =

School in Bangladesh

Manarat Dhaka International School & College
- মানারাত ঢাকা ইন্টারন্যাশনাল স্কুল এন্ড কলেজ

Location
- Plot (CEN) 16, Road No. 104, Gulshan-2; Gulshan, Dhaka-1212; Bangladesh; 23.7908°N 90.4207°E

Information
- Established: 1979
- Founder: Sheikh Fouad Abdulhameed Alkhateeb
- Chairman: Shah Abdul Hannan
- Principal: Brig Gen S. M. Mahbub-Ul-Alam, OSP, SGP, ndc, psc (retd)
- Teaching staff: 250
- Employees: 150
- Years: KG–12
- Enrollment: 3500
- Education system: Cambridge Assessment International Education
- Language: Bengali, English, Arabic
- Area: 2.7 acres
- Campus type: Urban
- Colors: Bottle Green, White
- Athletics: Cricket, football, badminton, table tennis, carrom, volleyball
- Publication: The Beacon, Manarat Science Journal
- Affiliation: MAD, MESA, TSC, MCCA
- Alumni: Manarites
- Website: www.manaratcollege.edu.bd

Manarat Dhaka International School & College (MDIC) (from the Arabic word منارة manārat "beacon") is a trust-owned school in Gulshan, Dhaka, Bangladesh. It offers British Curriculum from play-group to advanced level, offering GCE O-Level and GCE A-Level examinations, held by Cambridge International Education. Manarat emphasizes moral teachings and etiquette more than textbook knowledge. It encourages its students to learn Arabic from a very young age (up to grade 6). It also stresses Islamic teachings and inspires students to strengthen their iman.

The current principal of the school is Brig Gen S. M. Mahbub-Ul-Alam, OSP, SGP, ndc, psc (retd) and the school's vice principals are Professor Tahmina Yeasmeen and Md. Anwarul Hossain.

Due to the COVID-19 pandemic, the school was closed and classes & exams were taken through the online platform Zoom between March 2020 and March 2022.

== History ==
The Manarat trust established an English medium kindergarten school in 1979, named Manarat Dacca. In 1985 the school was renamed as Manarat Dhaka International School. With gradual advancement of the students in higher classes and with the launch of an English medium equivalent of HSC Level program in the A-Level exams, the name of the school was changed to Manarat Dhaka International College in 1991.

It was a time when English medium education was very rare in the country. A group of Islamic scholars under the guidance of the late Sheikh Fouad Abdulhameed Alkhateeb, the ambassador of the Kingdom of Saudi Arabia in Bangladesh, strongly felt the necessity of establishing an educational institution where eternal values of Islam could be taught along with modern education. With that view in mind, Manarat started its journey as an English medium institution under the curriculum of Cambridge International Examinations London with Islamic values at its bastion.

== Campus ==
The college is located in one of the quieter and more scenic parts of Gulshan, on the edge of Gulshan Lake. Although started in a hired house, it now owns four multi storied buildings and two big play grounds in front on an area of 2.7 acres of land. The campus is located in Gulshan, Plot - CEN 16, Road - 104 with 3500 active students and 250 teaching staff and 150 admin staff.

The northernmost building (internally called the Girls' Building) is a 5-story red brick building with white accents that houses girls' classrooms for grades 1-12 as well as an activity room. Connected to it is a white building called the Academic Building. This is the largest of the four buildings with 8 floors and houses a variety of rooms including classrooms and offices. This building also houses the Girls' Section's computer lab, a library, four labs for physics, chemistry, biology and general sciences, two multi-purpose halls on the topmost floor, the larger of which is named the Fouad Al-Khateeb Auditorium. Connected to it is the other southern 5-story red brick building, called the Boys' Building. This building hosts classrooms for grades 4-12 for boys, as well as a computer lab and a salah room. The fourth building was the latest addition in 2024 and has 4 floors. It is located just behind the Boys' building, is orange in color and has classrooms for boys from classes 4-5. Each building has its own lift. There is a playing field in between the buildings as well one in front of the boys' building to the south. The school holds an assembly on Sunday and Wednesday in these fields. There is a small yellow tin-shed building to the east of the larger field, adjacent to the Manarat University, which houses the grades of nursery and kindergarten.

== Activities ==
=== Debate ===
The Manarat Association of Debaters has hosted and participated in many competitions at home and abroad. This accomplished debating association has promoted Bangladesh by becoming runners-up in the SAARC Debate Championship in New Delhi in 2008. Members of the debating team also represented Bangladesh in the 1st World's Championship Debate Competition in 2006 at Wales, United Kingdom and in the 2nd World's Championship Debate Competition in Seoul, South Korea.

In the year 2007, MDIC ranked 2nd in the Bangladesh Debate Council's 3rd Pre-Worlds Ranking. Manarat holds the top position under "School and College Ranking – English" category.

Most recently, MDIC became semi-finalists at the Asian Schools Debate Championship 2018, held in Thailand.

The Manarat Debate Club, the sister concern of the MAD, has been operating within the school since 2008. In 2024, it officially became one of the 26 clubs under the supervision of MCCA.

=== Sports ===
Manarat regularly arranges and participates in various sporting events. The college hosted the MDIC Cup Football-2018 with teams from 18 English medium schools. The Manarites U-19 team were crowned 'Champions' and the U-14 Manarites were runners-up for their competition.

The Manarite football team also participated in the Gothia Cup-2016 held in China and Team Manarat continued to playoff B after reaching 3rd place in Group 4. In the playoff they made it to semi-finals.

=== Manarat Clubs for Co-Curricular Activities ===
MCCA is an inter-organizational association of MDIC staff, teachers and students founded in November 2023 for organizing and enhancing the extra-curricular activities performed by students. It officially began its operation in the November of next year by introducing 26 clubs under its command, most prominent of them being Manarat Science Club (MSC) and Manarat Business Club (MBC). Manarat Students' Welfare Association (MSWA), a community welfare association established in 2008, is included under MCCA.

MCCA held an inauguration ceremony on 30th January alongside the MBC's Business Fair 2024-25. It has since held numerous workshops and events under its different clubs, including science fairs under MSC and robotics workshop and seminars under Manarat Robotics and AI Club (MRAIC). It holds weekly speaking sessions in classroom as part of the Cultural Activity Classes on Thursdays.

The head of MCCA is the Principal himself, with the two vice-principals as his deputies. MCCA is governed by a committee of 30 teachers with two head co-ordinators, Dr. Maksudul Alam and Mrs. Sharmin Akter. Each club under MCCA has two teacher coordinators and governing student body.

== Notable alumni ==
- Nafees Bin Zafar, software engineer, first Bangladeshi to win an Oscar
