= Bangladesh Institute of Islamic Thought =

Bangladesh-based think tank

Bangladesh Institute of Islamic Thought (BIIT)
- Type: Private
- Industry: Research, Education
- Founded: 1989
- Headquarters: Dhaka, Bangladesh
- Area served: Bangladesh
- Key people: Shah Abdul Hannan chairman M. Abdul Aziz CEO

Bangladesh Institute of Islamic Thought (BIIT) is a research-oriented think-tank situated in Bangladesh and is registered with the International Institute of Islamic Thought, based in Washington, United States. BIIT is engaged in research and in-depth studies for synthesizing education, culture & ethics. It was established in the year 1989 and presently functions as a registered non-government organization.

== Leadership ==
Shah Abdul Hannan, a notable Bangladeshi intellectual, is a co-founder of the institute.

== Location and services ==
The divisional offices of the institute are located Chittagong, Rajshahi and Kushtia. The institution has a well resourced library.

== Publication ==
The institute regularly publishes books and translated works from Islamic scholars of other languages such as Arabic and English. It publishes a semiannual journal called Bangladesh Journal of Integrated Thought (BJIT) in English and Bengali.

== See also ==
- Islam in Bangladesh
