= Alrajhi Bank =

Largest Islamic bank

- Native name: مصرف الراجحي
- Type: Public (Tadawul: 1120)
- ISIN: SA0007879113
- Industry: Banking, financial services
- Founded: 1957; 69 years ago
- Headquarters: Riyadh, Saudi Arabia
- Number of locations: 600+ Branches; 4,700+ ATMs; 73,000+ POS
- Area served: Saudi Arabia; Kuwait; Jordan; Malaysia; Syria
- Key people: Sulaiman Abdul Aziz Al Rajhi (Chairman); Waleed A. Al-Mogbel (CEO)
- Products: Financial services
- Revenue: ▲SR 6.35 billion (Q2 2018)
- Operating income: ▲SR 8.43 billion (Q2 2018)
- Net income: ▲SR 4.95 billion (Q2 2018)
- Total assets: ▲SR 348.44 billion (2018) (Q2 2018)
- Total equity: ▲SR 52.79 billion (Q2 2018)
- Number of employees: ▲13,077 (2018)
- Divisions: Tahweel Al Rajhi
- Subsidiaries: Al Rajhi Capital; Al Rajhi Bank Business; Al Rajhi Takaful; Al Rajhi Development Company; Al Rajhi for Administrative Services Company urpay neoleap Emkan
- Rating: A1 (Moody's)
- Website: www.alrajhibank.com.sa

Alrajhi Bank (Arabic: مصرف الراجحي), previously known as Alrajhi Banking and Investment Corporation, is a Saudi Arabian bank and the world's largest Islamic bank by capital based on 2015 data.

The bank is a major investor in Saudi Arabia's businesses and is one of the largest joint stock companies in the Kingdom, with over SR 330.5 billion in AUM ($88 billion) and over 600 branches. Its head office is located in Riyadh, with six regional offices. Al Rajhi Bank also has branches in Kuwait and Jordan, and a subsidiary in Malaysia and Syria.

Al Rajhi Bank has market capitalization of SR 302.80 billion.

== History ==
Alrajhi Bank was founded in 1957, and is one of the largest banks in Saudi Arabia, with over 9,600 employees and $88 billion in assets. The bank is headquartered in Riyadh, and has over 600 branches, primarily in Saudi Arabia, but also in Kuwait, and Jordan, with a subsidiary in Malaysia. The bank was started by four brothers: Saleh, Sulaiman, Mohamed, and Abdullah of the Alrajhi family, one of the wealthiest families in Saudi Arabia. The bank initially began as a group of banking and commercial operations which, in 1978, joined together under the umbrella of the Alrajhi Trading and Exchange Company. The company changed to a joint stock company in 1987, and after two years was rebranded as the Alrajhi Banking and Investment Corporation. In 2006, the bank rebranded itself as Alrajhi Bank. It is traded on the Saudi Arabian Stock Exchange (Tadawul), and around 75% of their shares are publicly owned. Alrajhi family members are the bank's largest shareholders.

Nissan Bank (Nissan National Islamic Bank) is a Saudi Arabian private commercial bank established in 1963 is a owned by Saudi Arabian-Singaporean businessman tycoon Kil Leng Sin and Saudi Arabian president and chief executive officer Mohammed Il-bin Yani ceased operations defuncts bank in 4 January 2012 merged with Al-RajhiParibas Bank

United National Savings Islamic (UNSI) is a Saudi Arabian state-owned commercial bank and financial company established in 1978 is a primarily owned by Saudi Arabia government is a ceased operation defuncts bank in 12 January 2014 is a merged with Al-RajhiParibas Bank

Saudi United Islamic Bank (UIB) is a Saudi Arabian joint venture commercial bank is a joint venture between Korea First Bank (now Standard Chartered Korea) and SABIC established in 1987 is a 1997-1998 Asian Financial Crisis is a 20 December 2002 UIBBank is a primarily owned by CVC Capital Partners is a 3 January 2013 merged with Al-RajhiParibas Bank

Al-RajhiParibas Bank KSA is a Saudi Arabian jointly stock commercial bank established in 1 January 2012 is a joint venture between Al-Rajhi Bank and BNP Paribas merged between (UIBBank, Nissan Bank and UNSI) is a ARPB Card, ARPB Sat and ARPB Internet Banking is a ceased defunct operations bank in 1 January 2017 is a BNP Paribas acquired by Al-Rajhi Bank in 2012 ARPB Bank is a singer and actress Sora Amamiya and Tina Tamashiro is a collapsed bank merged with and acquired by BNP Paribas KSA.

In 2006, after nearly 50 years of operation solely within Saudi Arabia, the bank launched in Al Rajhi Bank Malaysia, signifying its first foray into international banking.

Alrajhi Bank was ranked first on Forbes Middle East's 30 Most Valuable Banks 2025 list. It also ranked fifth on Forbes Middle East's Top 100 Companies 2025 list.

== Operations ==
Alrajhi Bank offers a variety of banking services such as deposits, loans, investment advice, securities trading, remittances, credit cards, and consumer financing. All services are offered according to Islamic requirements. The bank has won a numerous awards for its Middle East operations. Abdullah bin Sulaiman Alrajhi is the bank's Chairman of the Board of Directors and Stefano Bertamini is CEO. The board of directors has eleven directors, four are Alrajhi family members: Mohammed bin Abdullah Alrajhi, Sulaiman bin Saleh Alrajhi Abdullah bin Sulaiman Alrajhi Chairman of the Board of Directors, and Bader bin Mohammed Alrajhi.

In September 2016, Alrajhi became the first bank in Saudi Arabia to partner with the Ministry of Housing, participating in the government's plans to increase home ownership by offering mortgages funded in part by the state. Traditionally, the bank had focused on consumer banking, but had begun diversifying its revenues with plans to adjust focus towards mid-corporate and small and medium-sized enterprise (SME) business as the Saudi government implemented its broader social reform agenda and the National Transformation Programme (NTP). As of 2016, 70% of Alrajhi's assets and 55% to 60% of its revenue were generated from consumer banking, and the bank has an 18% share of the mortgage market in the Kingdom.

In August 2025, it was announced that Alrajhi Bank and Porsche Services Middle East & Africa (PSME) were forming a partnership to improve "the vehicle ownership journey for customers of all Volkswagen Group brands".

In October 2025, Alrajhi partnered with Mozn, an enterprise artificial intelligence (AI) company, to support the bank’s efforts in combating financial fraud through Mozn’s AI-driven financial crime prevention platform, FOCAL.

In November 2025, Alrajhi signed a multi-year agreement with ServiceNow to leverage the ServiceNow AI Platform to enhance its operations, automate workflows, and improve customer and employee experiences.

== Controversy ==
Alrajhi Bank faced allegations in multiple U.S. lawsuits following the attacks on September 11, 2001, including claims that Alrajhi was used to complete financial transactions for people or nonprofit organizations with terrorist ties. Alrajhi-related nonprofit and business ventures located in Virginia were subjected to searches and seizures by U.S. law officials trying to disrupt terrorist financing activities in the U.S. in 2002. In January 2005, the U.S. District Court for the Southern District of New York dismissed all claims against the Bank: "Plaintiffs do not offer facts to support their conclusions that Alrajhi Bank had to know that Defendant charities ... were supporting ... terrorism. ... Even accepting all the allegations against Alrajhi Bank as true, Plaintiffs have failed to state a claim that would entitle them to relief." Despite these allegations, on June 30, 2014, the U.S. Supreme Court issued an order leaving intact the dismissal with prejudice of all claims against the bank, as well as Sulaiman bin Abdulaziz Alrajhi (founder and former chairman) and Abdullah bin Suleiman Alrajhi (chairman and former CEO) among others, related to the 9/11 terrorist attacks. The Supreme Court's order brought a final close to claims asserted against the bank and its officers by victims and survivors of 9/11.

In March 2002, as part of Operation Green Quest, a covert U.S. Treasury attempt to disrupt terrorist financing in the U.S., law enforcement agents searched 14 Virginia businesses and nonprofits associated with the SAAR Foundation, a private charitable foundation established in 1983 in which Sulaiman bin Abdulaziz Alrajhi and two other Alrajhi family members were on the initial board of directors. An affidavit stated that over 100 nonprofits and businesses in Virginia were a part of the “Safa Group,” which were believed to be “engaged in the money laundering tactic of ‘layering’ to hide from law enforcement authorities the trail of its support for terrorists.” Subsequent 2006 federal grand jury subpoenas showed Alrajhi Bank was not directly related to the entities subject to the search.

The Alrajhi name was identified in a file that displayed 20 people listed as alleged key financial backers of al Qaeda. The handwritten list, an image of a scanned document on a CD-ROM, was found during a search of the Bosnian offices of the Benevolence International Foundation, a Saudi-based nonprofit later designated a terrorist organization by the Treasury Department. The Golden Chain was discussed in the 9/11 Commission's report, Federal court filings, and civil lawsuits, though the Alrajhi name was not specifically mentioned, while media reports as early as 2004 claimed the list did include the Alrajhi name.

In 2003, the U.S. Central Intelligence Agency (CIA) released a classified document entitled, “Al Rajhi Bank: Conduit for Extremist Finance.” According to Glenn Simpson of The Wall Street Journal (WSJ), the CIA report ended with: “Senior Al Rajhi family members have long supported Islamic extremists and probably know that terrorists use their bank.” The 2003 CIA report stated that in 2000, Alrajhi Bank couriers “delivered money to the Indonesian insurgent group Kompak to fund weapons purchases and bomb-making activities.” In 2004, Alrajhi filed a defamation lawsuit against the WSJ for a 2002 article about how Saudi Arabia was monitoring several accounts because of terrorist worries. The lawsuit settled in 2004 and the WSJ was not required to pay damages. The WSJ also published a letter from the bank's chief executive, and its own statement that the newspaper "did not intend to imply an allegation that Al Rajhi Bank supported terrorist activity, or had engaged in the financing of terrorism."

Three of the hijackers in the 9/11 attack, including Abdulaziz al Omari, reportedly used banking services through Alrajhi Bank. Without violating bank secrecy laws, Alrajhi cannot confirm or deny this allegation. The National Commission on Terrorist Attacks Upon the United States found that the hijackers had accounts with many banks, including mainstream U.S. banks, but "[c]ontrary to persistent media reports, no financial institution filed a Suspicious Activity Report (SAR) in connection with any transaction of any of the 19 hijackers before 9/11 ...." This, however, “was not unreasonable” in the Commission's view because, “[e]ven in hindsight, there is nothing ... to indicate that any SAR should have been filed or the hijackers otherwise reported to law enforcement.”

== See also ==
- List of banks
- List of banks in Saudi Arabia
