= Kurdish American Caucus =

Established on May 23, 2008 by US Congressmen Lincoln Davis (D-Tennessee) and Joe Wilson (R-South Carolina), the Kurdish American Congressional Caucus is a bipartisan Congressional committee focusing on US-Kurdish relations, understanding Kurdish culture, and addressing overarching issues important to Kurdish-Americans in the U.S. and elsewhere. The KACC pays special recognition to Kurds in the U.S. and the diaspora, their contributions to the United States and in Iraq, highlighting the necessity to promote their rights as an ethnic minority.

At the launch of the Kurdish American Caucus, Rep. Davis stated that he “... hopes that this [KACC] will stand as a symbol of continued friendship and cooperation between the United States and Iraq's Kurdish people in our effort to bring peace and stability to a federated Iraq.”

In February 2012, Rep. Jared Polis accepted the Democratic co-chair position to lead the caucus. He joined the Republican co-chair Rep. Joe Wilson.

The Kurdish people number 30 million worldwide; with an estimated 50,000 in US. The ongoing mission of the KACC is to provide them with an established voice in the United States.

== Current House Members ==
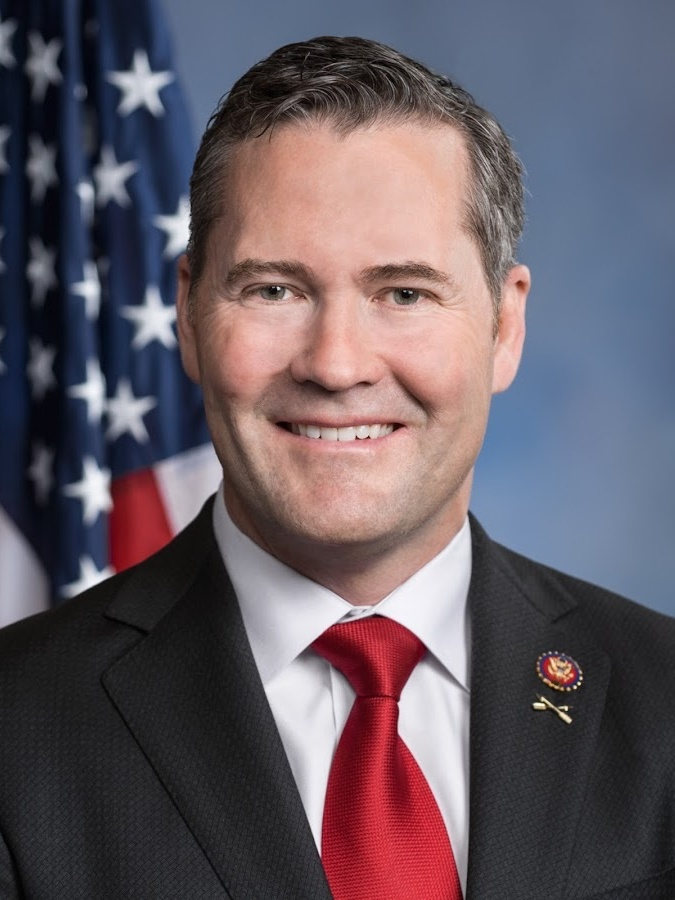
Mike Waltz

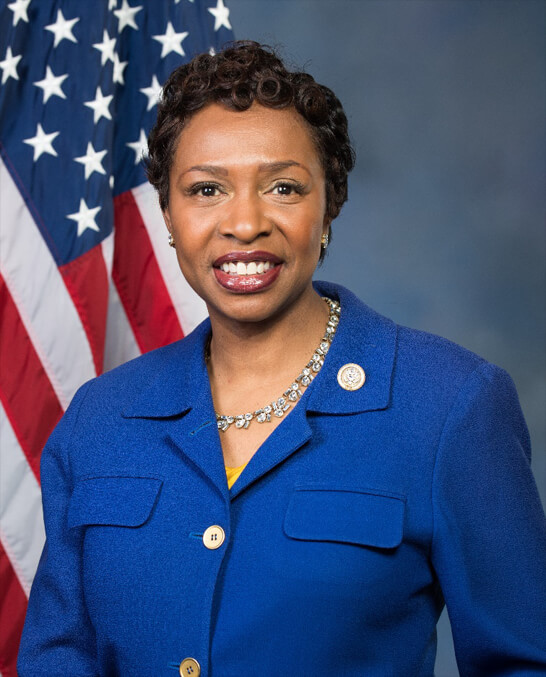
Yvette Clarke

- Ralph Abraham (R‑LA‑5)
- Steve Chabot (R‑OH‑1)
- Mike Waltz (R‑FL‑6)
- David Cicilline (D‑RI‑1)
- Yvette Clarke (D‑NY‑9)
- Gerry Connolly (D‑VA‑11)
- Jim Cooper (D‑TN‑5)
- Susan Davis (D‑CA‑49)
- Jeff Duncan (R‑SC‑3)
- Mike Gallagher (R‑WI‑8)
- Louie Gohmert (R‑TX‑1)
- Sam Graves (R‑MI‑6)
- Jim Himes (D‑CT‑4)
- Doug Lamborn (R‑CO‑5)
- Blaine Luetkemeyer (R‑MO‑3)
- Carolyn Maloney (D‑NY‑12)
- Michael McCaul (R‑TX‑10)
- Gregory Meeks (D‑NY‑5)
- Colin Peterson (D‑MN‑7)
- Mike Quigley (D‑IL‑5)
- Brad Sherman (D‑CA‑24)
- Scott Tipton (D‑CO‑3)
- Terri Sewell (D‑AL‑7)
- Tim Walberg (R‑MI‑5)
- Joe Wilson (R‑SC‑2)- Republican co-chair
- Frederica Wilson (D‑FL‑24)

== See also ==
- Kurdish Americans
