= Yaqub Mirza =

Pakistani businessman

- Born: December 6, 1946; Karachi, British Raj
- Died: December 3, 2025 (age 78)
- Education: MSc from the University of Karachi (1969), M.A. in Teaching Science from University of Texas at Dallas (1975), PhD in Physics (1974)
- Occupations: Business and teaching

M. Yaqub Mirza (c. 1946 - December 3, 2025 in Karachi, British Raj (now Pakistan)) was a Herndon, Virginia-based businessman and Islamic activist.

== Background ==
Muhammad Yaqub Mirza held a MSc from the University of Karachi (1969), and a PhD in Physics (1974) and M.A. in Teaching Science (1975) from the University of Texas at Dallas. His doctoral thesis was entitled Multiphoton Ionization of Cesium Through Resonant Dissociative States of Cs2 and his thesis advisor was Carl B. Collins.

Mirza was a co-founder of the International Institute of Islamic Thought. He was a co-founder and trustee (1984–2003) of Amana Mutual Funds Trust, a Bellingham, Washington-based mutual fund that operates in accordance with Sharia financial principles. From 1998 until his death in late 2025, he was President and CEO of Sterling Management Group, Inc (SMG).

== Lecturing career ==
Mirza has delivered lecture on Islamic finance and entrepreneurship at several institutions.

== Legal issues and political activity ==
In 2002, Mirza's offices were raided by the FBI as part of an investigation into money laundering and terrorism, although Mirza was not charged with any crime as a result of this.

Mirza and Sterling Group were active financial supporters of the Republican Party in Virginia.
