= Manarat International University =

Private university in Bangladesh

Manarat International University (MIU)
- মানারাত ইন্টারন্যাশনাল ইউনিভার্সিটি
- Type: Private
- Established: 2001
- Accreditation: University Grants Commission of Bangladesh; Pharmacy Council of Bangladesh
- Academic affiliations: Universiti Malaysia Pahang
- Chairman: Mohammad Fazlur Rahman
- Chancellor: President Mohammed Shahabuddin
- Vice-Chancellor: Mohammad Abdur Rob
- Faculty: 200
- Students: 3000
- Location: Main Campus: Plot# CEN 16, Road# 106, Gulshan 2, Dhaka; Permanent Campus: Ashulia Model Town, Savar, Khagan, Ashulia, Dhaka Division, Bangladesh; 23.8777°N 90.3122°E
- Campus: Main campus (Gulshan), Permanent campus (Ashulia), 3.9 acres (1.6 ha)
- Colours: Green & blue
- Website: www.manarat.ac.bd

Manarat International University (MIU) is a private university in Dhaka, Bangladesh. It was established in 2001 by the Manarat Trust.

== History ==
Manarat International University was established on 21 May 2001 by the Manarat Trust which owns Manarat Dhaka International School and College.

In August 2016, Rapid Action Battalion arrested three students of the university who were members of the female unit of Jama'atul Mujahideen Bangladesh. Counter Terrorism and Transnational Crime arrested a student of the university for being a member and recruiter of a banned religious extremist group, Ansar Al Islam, in November 2021.

In September 2022, the government of Bangladesh dismantled the existing trustee board alleging it had links with Bangladesh Jamaat-e-Islami. The vice-chancellor, Md Nazrul Islam, said he was ignorant about the allegations as he was appointed only in 2020. Mayor of Dhaka North and Awami League politician, Atiqul Islam, was appointed chairman of the newly created Trustee board. Justices Zafar Ahmed and Mohammed Akhtaruzzaman of the High Court Division issued a ruling in October asking the government to explain why their actions should not be declared illegal following a petition by AKM Fazlul Haque, who was a member of the disbanded trustee board of Manarat International University. In November, the university offered a 50% discount on admission fees.

On 2 January 2023, the University Grants Commission ordered Manarat International University to only recruit students for their permanent campus and not their temporary campuses.

== Departments ==
- Department of Computer Science and Engineering(CSE)
- Department of Electronics and Electrical Engineering(EEE)
- Department of Pharmacy
- Department of English
- Department of Journalism and Media Studies
- Department of Magical Affairs
- Department of Business Administration(BBA)
- Department of Law(LLB)
- Department of Islamic Studies

The university offers the following postgraduate programs:

- Masters of Arts in English
- Masters of Business Administration(MBA)
- M.Pharm(Will begin soon)

== List of vice-chancellors ==
- Md Nazrul Islam (present)

== Board of trustees ==
Name	Position	Profession	Reference
	Chairman		
	Member		
	Member		
	Member		
	Member		
	Member		
	Member		
	Member		
	Member		
	Member		
	Member		
	Member		
	Member		
	Member		

== Library ==
Manarat International University library (MIU Library) has more than 16,000 books, 200 e-books, 150 DVDs, and a collection of print journals and other publications. The library subscribes to 10 local and 5 foreign journals, 5 local magazines, one foreign daily, and most of the leading national dailies published from Dhaka. The library can accommodate over 200 students in its reading rooms. On average, 800 students use the library each day. The library has two branches: one at Gulshan Campus, another at Mirpur Campus.

== Research scope ==
Manarat University inspires and provides ample opportunity for research. The pharmacy department's laboratories are well equipped by modern research items. It has launched the following labs for pharmacy department:

- Pharmaceutical Microbiology Lab
- Pharmaceutical Analysis lab
- Pharmaceutical Technology lab
- Pharmacognosy Lab
- Medicinal chemistry Lab
- Animal Lab for Physiological Research
- Chemistry Lab (for synthetic chemistry)

== See also ==
- List of Islamic educational institutions
- Manarat Dhaka International School and College
