= Saad Abbas Ismail =

American archaeologist

Saad A. Ismail
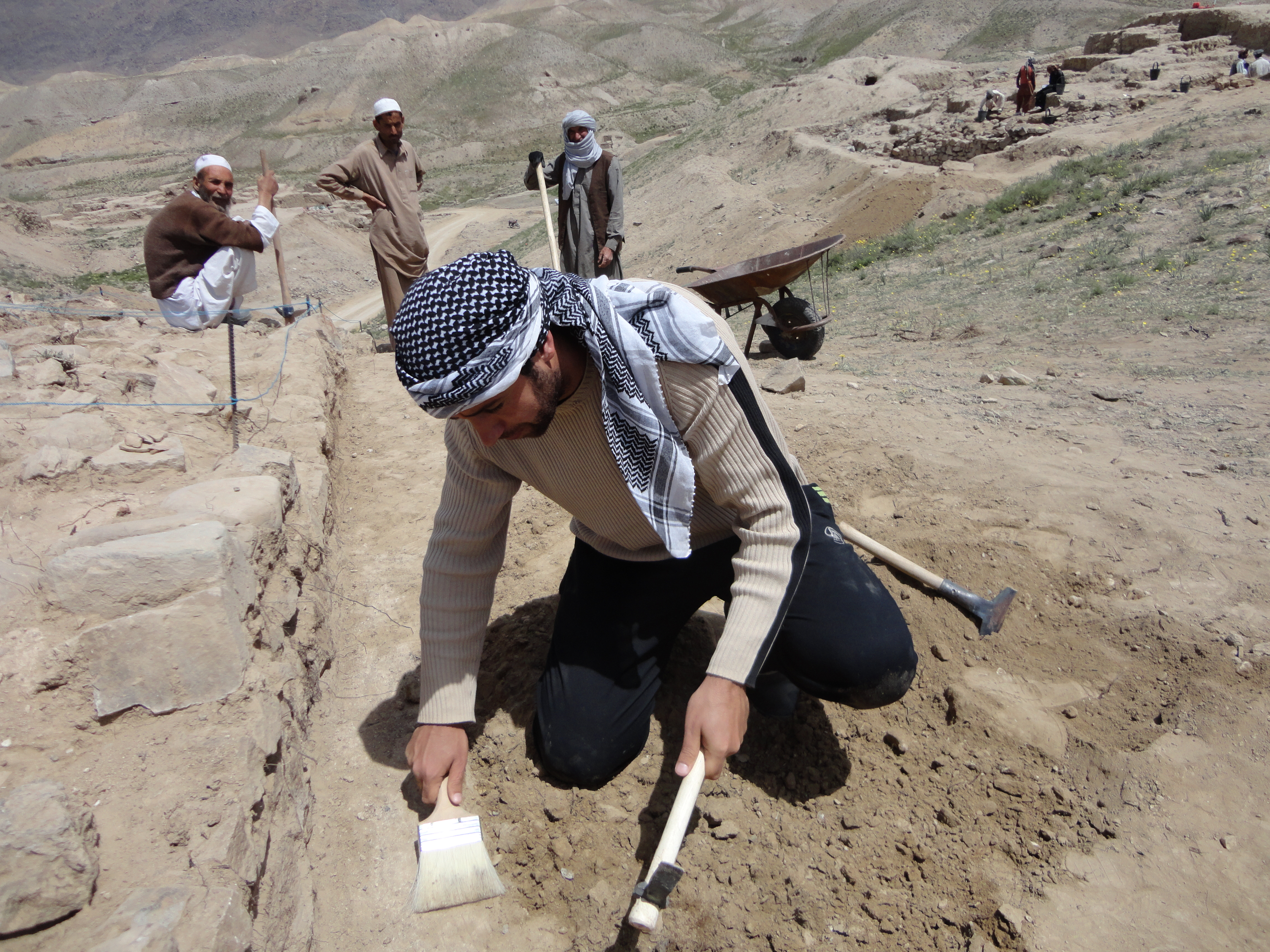
- Saad A. Ismail, Kurdish archaeologist
- Born: Saad Abbas Ismail; Kamishli, Syria
- Education: Lebanese University
- Occupations: Archaeologist, Translator, Writer
- Years active: 2011–present
- Era: 21st century
- Employer(s): World Bank, Chicago University, Amsterdam University, Berlin University, Leeds University, Yale University, American University of Beirut, London University
- Known for: Archaeological work in the Middle East, Mesopotamia, and Syria
- Notable work: "From North to East of Syria: Ancient Mesopotamia Nationalism" (2008); "The Syrian Plateau from Paleolithic Period to the Rise of the Islamic Period" (2012); "Theory and Method in Archaeology: How Can We Integrate the Two to Arrive at a Better Understanding of the Past and Apply Archaeology to Present and Future Problems More Efficiently" (2013); "The Pre-Imperial Persians at the Land of Anshan: Some Preliminary Observations" (2014)

Saad A. Ismail is a Syrian-American archaeologist, translator, and writer. He has published extensively on a range of archaeological topics and has worked at numerous archaeological sites around the world.

He was born and raised in Kamishli, Syria, and studied Archaeology at the Lebanese University in Beirut, Lebanon. Saad completed his Master's degree in 2011, focusing on Orthostates at Tall Halaf.

After receiving his master's degree, Saad wrote many articles about Middle Eastern and Mesopotamian archaeology, covering topics related to Lebanon, Mes Aynak, Afghanistan, and Syria. Since then, he has devoted himself to excavations with prominent institutions such as the World Bank, University of Chicago, University of Amsterdam, Berlin University, Leeds University, Yale University, Lebanese University, American University of Beirut, and University of London. He has also written and translated books and articles on archaeology and archaeological studies.

Additionally, Saad is an expert on the archaeology of northeastern Syria, where looting has been a significant issue in recent years.

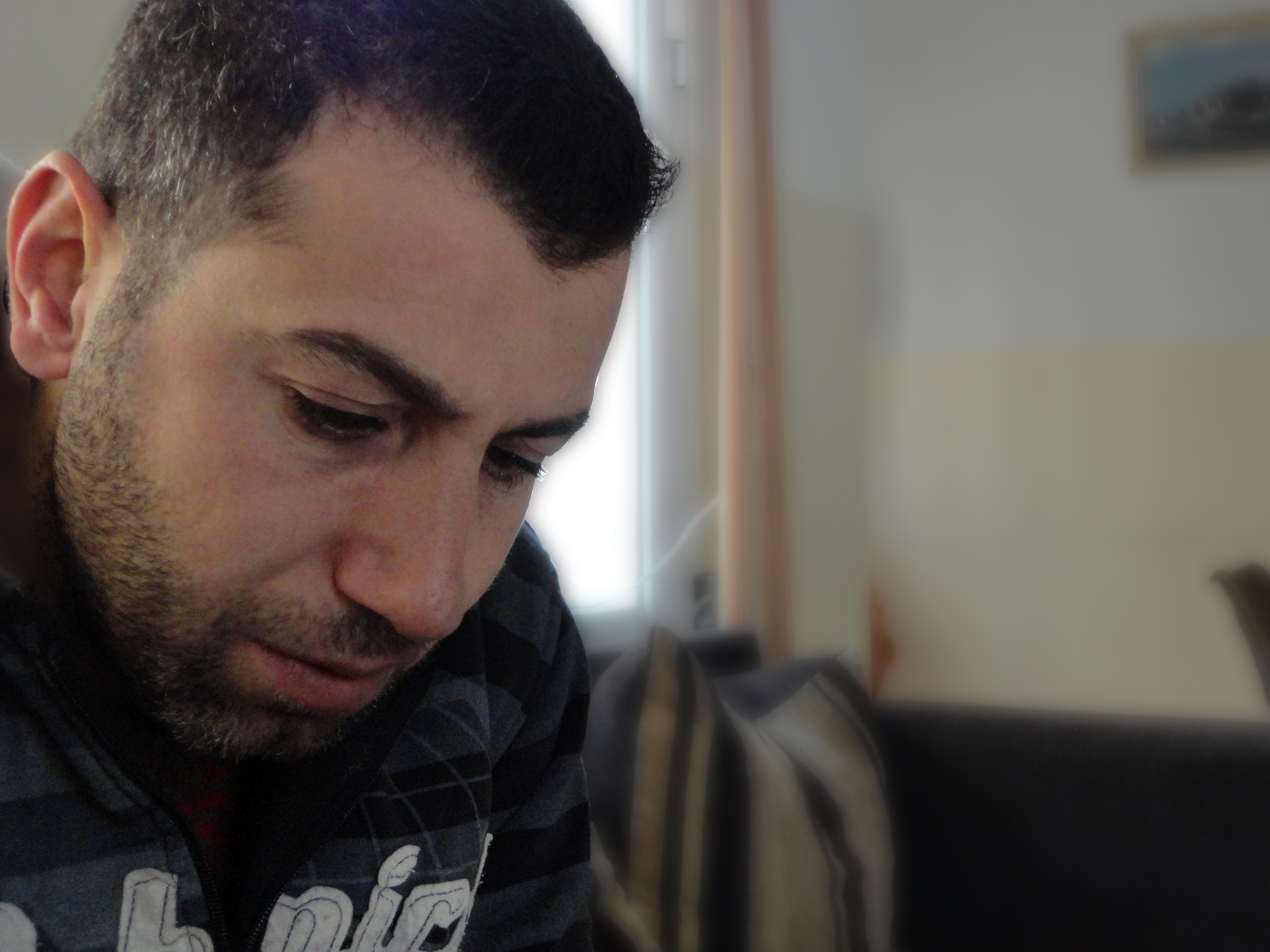
Saad Ismail

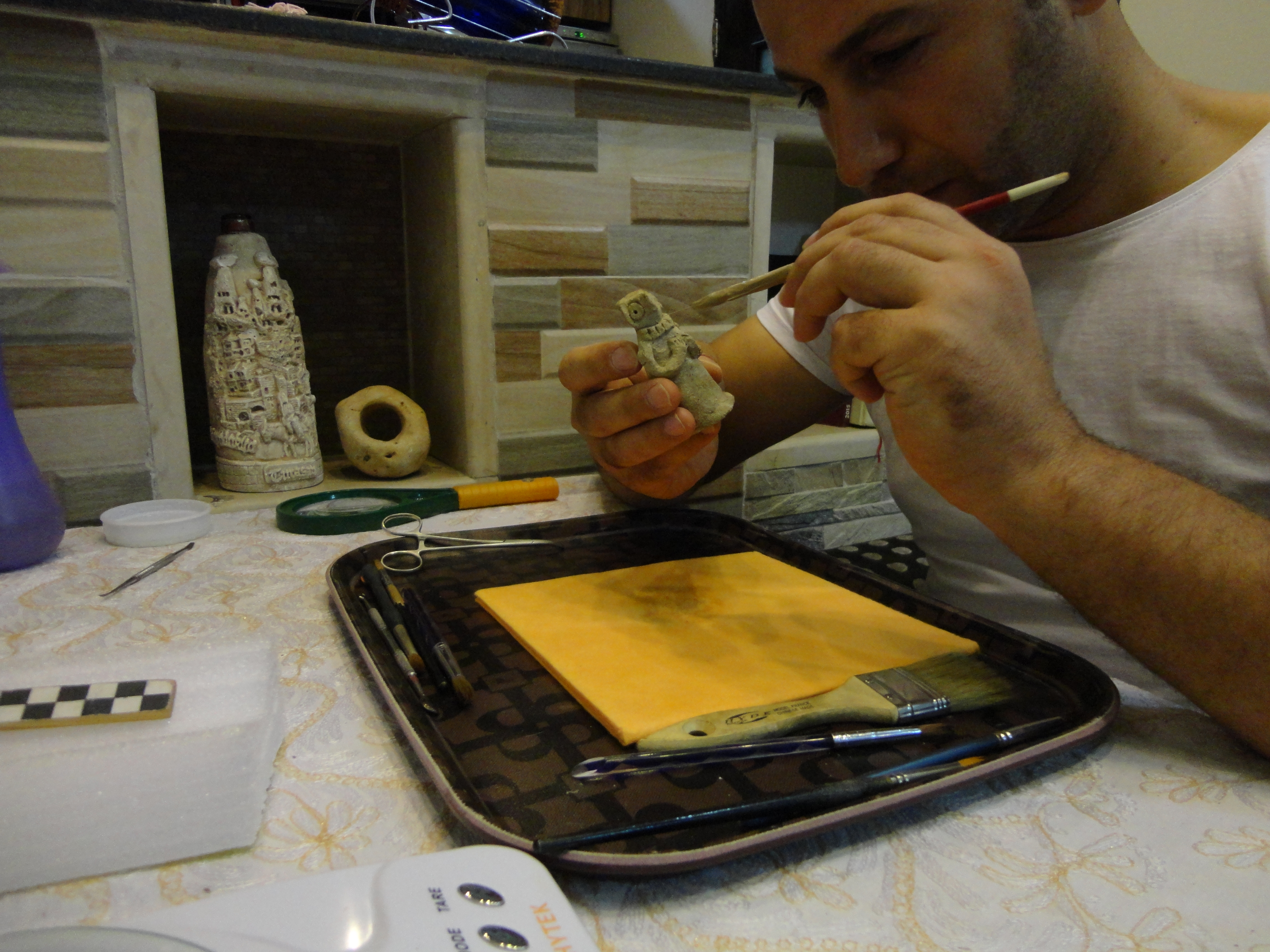
Saad Ismail during the cleaning of one of the objects found in northeast Syria.
