= Jamal al Barzinji =

Kurdish-American businessman (1939-2015)

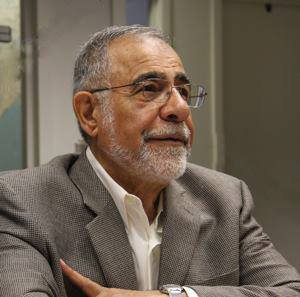
- Jamal al Barzinji in 2011
- Born: December 15, 1939; Mosul, Iraq
- Died: September 26, 2015 (aged 75)
- Education: University of Sheffield, England, in 1962; Louisiana State University in 1974
- Occupations: Businessman, entrepreneur and educational reformer

Jamal al Barzinji (Arabic: جمال برزنجي) (December 15, 1939 – September 26, 2015) was an Iraqi-American businessman, entrepreneur and educational reformer.

He was a founding member of the International Institute of Islamic Thought, the World Assembly of Muslim Youth, and the SAAR Foundation. He was a founder and served on the board of the Islamic Society of North America and is a past president of the Muslim Students' Association.

== Background ==
Born to Kurdish parents in Iraq, he had a PhD. and MSc. in Chemical Engineering, with a minor in Management, from Louisiana State University in 1974 and a BSc. in Chemical Engineering & Fuel Technology from the University of Sheffield, England, in 1962.

Dr. Barzinji was a dean at International Islamic University Malaysia (IIUM). As President of the International Institute of Islamic Thought (IIIT), he worked with various universities to endow chairs of Islamic Studies and programs of interfaith understanding, such as the ones at Georgetown University, Harvard University, George Mason University, Nazareth College, Huron University College and Hartford Seminary.

Barzinji died on September 26, 2015, after a long illness.

== Posthumous honors ==
On September 25, 2011, Barzinji was awarded a lifetime achievement award by the Arab community of northern Virginia at an event attended by Virginia governor Tim Kaine.

He was awarded a posthumous Honorary Doctor of Divinity at Hartford Seminary in 2016.

The Barzinji Institute for Global Virtual Learning was established in his memory at Shenandoah University.
