= Al Sulay Sub-Municipality =

Baladiyah al-Sulay بلدية السلي
- Baladiyah
- Country: Saudi Arabia
- City: Riyadh
- Website: sulai.alriyadh.gov.sa

Baladiyah al-Sulay (Arabic: بلدية السلي), officially the Al-Sulay Sub-Municipality is one of the 16 baladiyahs of Riyadh, Saudi Arabia. It includes 13 neighborhoods and is responsible for their maintenance, development and planning.

== Neighborhoods and districts ==
- Al-Jazirah
- Al-Fayha
- Al-Sa'adah
- Khashm al-Aan
- Al-Sulay
- Al-Mishaal
- Al-Nur
- Al-Dafaa'
- Al-Iskan
- Al-Manakh
- Sinaiyah al-Jadidah
- Al-Birriyah
- Heet
