= Saleh Abdul Aziz Al Rajhi =

Saudi businessman and philanthropist

Sheikh Saleh Abdulaziz Al Rajhi
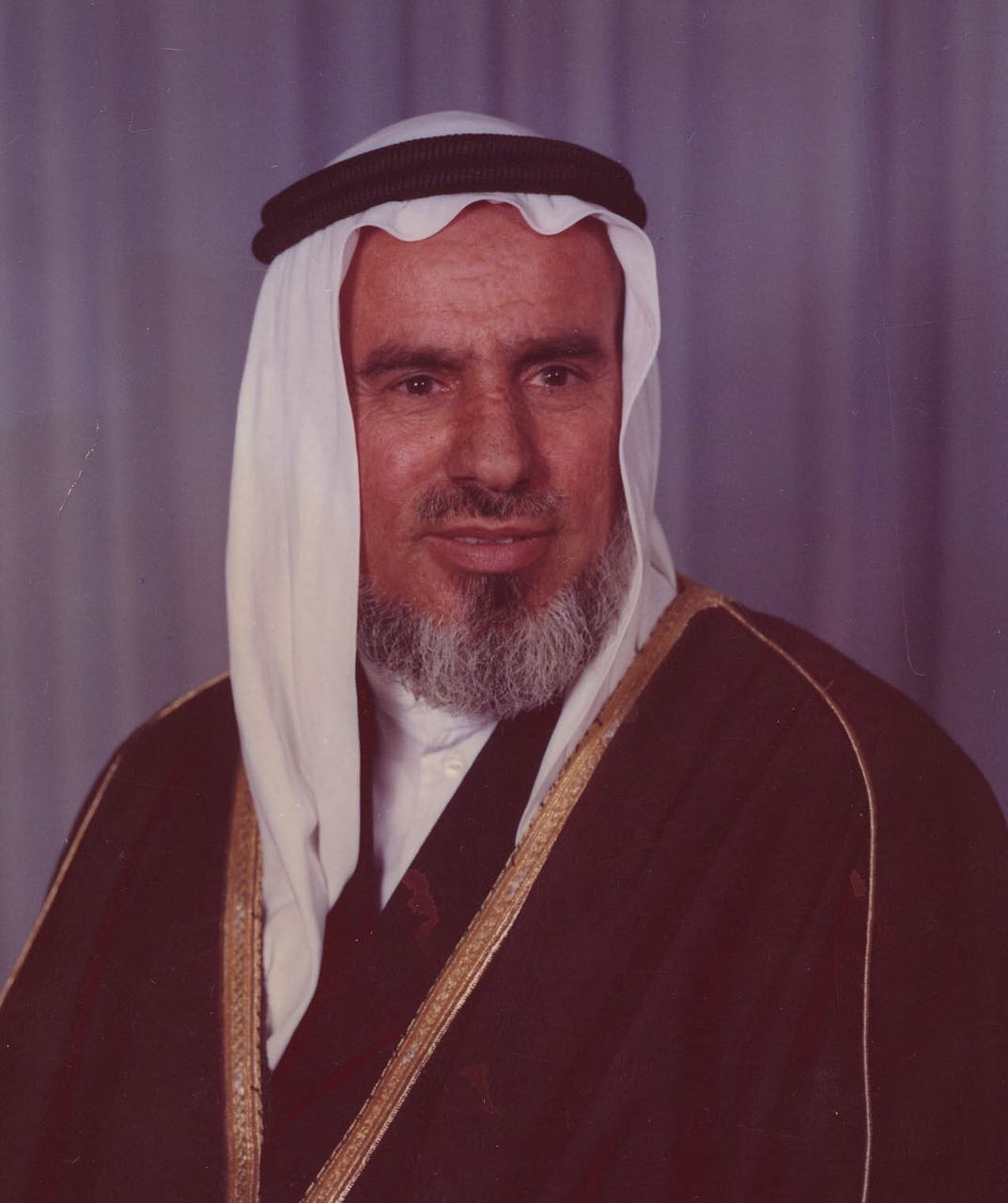
- Born: 1921
- Died: February 12, 2011 (aged 89–90)
- Known for: Founding Al Rajhi Bank
- Children: Naif Saleh Alrajhi

Sheikh Saleh Abdul Aziz Al Rajhi (1921 – February 12, 2011) (Arabic: الشيخ صالح بن عبد العزيز الراجحي) was a Saudi Arabian banker who founded the Al-Rajhi Bank, the largest Islamic banking institution.

The eldest of the Al Rajhi family, he was engaged in other successful industries such as construction, real estate and agriculture. Aside from being a prominent Saudi businessman, he was also a philanthropist known for significant contributions in the field of agriculture, education and health. During his later years, Al Rajhi established instructions for the establishment of a foundation to manage continuous endowments towards the charities which he had constantly supported in life.

== Early life ==
Saleh bin Abdul-Aziz bin Saleh ibn Suleiman ibn Mohammed ibn Suleiman ibn Nasser Al Rajhi was born 1921 in Al-Bukayriyah, Qassim, KSA. His father, Sheikh Abdul-Aziz Al-Rajhi was a farmer and trader of lesser means. After his father's move Riyadh to seek better business prospects, Saleh started his education under Sheikh Muhammad Ibn Ibrahim. He completed the Quran and other studies by the age of 13 years old.

== Early business enterprise ==
In the early 1930s, Al Rajhi worked odd jobs at the local marketplace to earn money. Initially, he worked as a porter. Upon saving some money, Al Rajhi used it as capital to trade scrap items. He bought and sold keys, locks and haberdashery items, hawking the items in public places, particularly in the busy areas adjacent to the markets and mosques.

In 1937, as Al Rajhi turned 16 years old, he managed to occupy a space among the vendors and set up a bastah (a small trading place on the ground demarcated by a sheet or cloth spread upon which items are placed). He was first located in Safat, in front of the Grand Mosque in Riyadh. This involved breaking down Riyals into change – gursh and halalahs. For this he earned a commission of 5%.

As his business grew, he changed his bastah for a chest. This had kept his money in different denominations safe. Gradually, his customers started to bring in different currencies for him to change. Businessmen, pilgrims and travelers would exchange different monies from Indian Rupees to gold.

== Currency exchange business ==
In 1947, Al Rajhi opened a formal currency shop in Riyadh. He sent for his brothers, Mohammed and Sulaiman, to be a part of the business. Sulaiman, who later succeeded his brother as head of the family conglomerate, was a teenager then, hired for a salary of $10 to do exchange delivery and messenger jobs for the shop. The older Al Rajhi developed the systems and methods by which they recorded, traded and handled the money they received.

Toward the 1950s, Al Rajhi sent his brother Sulaiman to Mecca to conduct the exchange business for pilgrims and business people who had frequented the area. Sulaiman, with the blessing of his older brother remained in Mecca and further expanded to Jeddah which was growing economically at the time as well. The brothers conducted their currency business between the three branches for the next 25 years, which marked the beginnings of Al-Rajhi Bank.

== Al Rajhi Bank ==
In 1957, the brothers formally established the beginnings of Al-Rajhi Bank, with Al Rajhi travelling to other countries in the region to initiate relationships with various banking institutions. He had also engaged in the first gold trade with Kuwait. Aside from this, Al Rajhi also established a unique system of drafts and money transfers. Eventually, he was able to connect to the United States banks through his established reputation in the Middle East. By the 1960s, the Al Rajhis were banking in most of the major financial sectors across Europe and Asia.

== Agriculture ==
=== Al Batin Project ===
In 1993, Al Rajhi established an agricultural plantation in Buraydah City, Qassim region. It concentrated on the production of wheat, barley, watermelon, and an assortment of vegetable with an intercropping of date palms over 5,466 hectares of farmland.

In 1995, upon the instructions of Al Rajhi, the plantation diverted its direction and focused mainly on palm dates, planting 63,000 seedlings of 45 palm date varieties with the goal of reaching 200,000 trees. This project was supervised by the Ministry of Agriculture which approved of the installation of specialized irrigation systems.

In 2006, the Al Batin Palm Project was recognized by the Guinness Book of World Records (General Information and Standard Achievements) as the largest palm tree project in the world.

=== Durma Project ===
In 1994-1996, Al Rajhi started the Durma Project. With a land area of 760 hectares, specialized tissue palms were planted. The area had a unique characteristic which included high arability of the soil, availability of natural deep wells and low water tables. As with the Al Batin project, the farms were initially planted with wheat and barley and subsequently transitioned the crop to palm dates. The three-tiered project spearheaded by Al Rajhi spanning 1994-1996 aimed to plant 50,000 palm seedlings of different types.

== Other projects ==
In the 1990s Al-Rajhi turned over the reins of the heading the Al Rajhi Bank to focus on real estate and agriculture. His ventures in these two sectors eventually became some of the most successful in KSA. Aside from these, Al Rajhi held stakes in another financial of import Al Baraka Banking Group and shares in cement and construction ventures.

Aside from the main business of currency exchange and banking, Saleh Al Rajhi held various positions in other companies with the following designations:

Year Established	Position	Company
N/A	Managing Director	Central Electricity Company
1955	Member, founder and chairman	Saudi Cement Company
1959	Member, founder and chairman	National Gypsum Company
1961	Member, founder and chairman	Yamama Cement Company
1961	Member and founder	Chamber of Commerce and Industry in Riyadh
1977	Member, founder and chairman	Saudi Ceramic Company
1977	Member and founder	Saudi Lime Sand Bricks Company
1978	Member, founder and chairman	Southern Cement Company
1978	Founder	Saleh Abdul Aziz Al-Rajhi & Co. Ltd.
1981	Member, founder and chairman	Nadec Agricultural Development Company
1982	Member, founder and chairman	Hail Agricultural Development Company
1983	Founder	Tabuk Company for Agricultural Development
1987	Member, founder and chairman	Al Rajhi Banking and Investment Company
N/A	Member and founder	Light Buildings Company (SIBOREX) and Saudi Serpo Company Limited.
N/A	Member of the Board of Directors	National Company for Operation and Industrial Services

== See also ==
- Sulaiman Abdul Aziz Al Rajhi
- Al Rajhi Bank
