= Khaled Saffuri =

Arab-American political activist

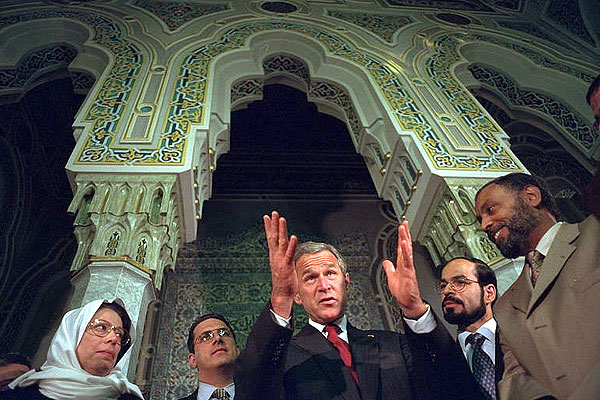
- Saffuri standing on the right of President George Bush at a visit to the Islamic Center of Washington.
- Born: Lebanon
- Education: University of Redlands
- Occupation: Activist
- Employer: The National Interest Foundation
- Title: President and Founder

Khaled Saffuri (Arabic: خالد صفوري; born in Lebanon) is an Arab-American political activist of Palestinian origin, and the founder of The National Interest Foundation. He is also the co-founder of the Islamic Free Market Institute.

== Background ==
Brought up as a stateless exile in Kuwait, Saffuri came to the US as a student in 1982, and started college in San Diego, eventually receiving a bachelor's degree in Business Administration and a master's degree in Management Science from the University of Redlands, California.

== Career ==
Saffuri moved to Washington, DC in 1987 to work as Development Director with the American Arab Anti-Discrimination Committee, a civil rights group founded by former US Senator James Abourezk In 1990, he joined the National Association of Arab-Americans (NAAA) and served as an Assistant Executive Director until September 1993.

Saffuri was executive director of American Task Force for Bosnia (ATFB), an organization he established in December 1992 to consolidate efforts among mainstream Muslim, Christian, Jewish, and other ethnic organizations in the United States to end the conflict in Bosnia. Saffuri was also the director for government affairs for the American Muslim Council (AMC) from September 1995 until December 1997.

In 2018, Saffuri founded The National Interest Foundation (NIF), a nonpartisan nonprofit think tank organization which is focused on bettering relationships between the United States and countries across the globe through the promotion of smarter foreign policy. NIF focuses specifically on human rights and promoting democracy in the Middle East. He currently serves as the president of the organization.

== The National Interest Foundation ==
The National Interest Foundation (NIF) was founded in 2018 to promote freedom and democracy and expose the actions of repressive regimes in the Middle East and around the world. The organizations hosts monthly lectures and an annual international conference on US foreign policy and human rights on Capitol Hill in Washington D.C. It also published weekly newsletters with analysis on human rights and democratic issues, primarily focusing on the Middle East. NIF also periodically published long, in-depth reports on its website.
