= International Institute of Islamic Thought =

Islamic organization based in Virginia, United States

- Abbreviation: IIIT
- Formation: 1981
- Type: Non-profit
- Headquarters: 555 Grove Street, Herndon, Virginia
- Subsidiaries: Bangladesh Institute of Islamic Thought
- Website: www.iiit.org

The International Institute of Islamic Thought (IIIT) is a privately held non-profit organization in the United States founded by Ismail al-Faruqi and Anwar Ibrahim. It was established as a non-profit 501(c)(3) non-denominational organization in 1981, and is based in Herndon, Virginia. The stated objective of the institute is to revive and reform Islamic thought through research on advancing education in Muslim societies, and publishing, translating and teaching this work.

== History ==
The institute was founded in 1981 by Palestinian-American scholar Ismail al-Faruqi and Malaysian politician and Prime Minister Anwar Ibrahim. The institute is a non-profit 501(c)(3) non-denominational organization located in Herndon, Virginia.

In a 2016 essay published by the American Academy of Religion's Religious Studies News, the then IIIT director Ermin Sinanović explained that IIIT had been intended to resolve an "intellectual crisis" which afflicted the global Muslim community. Sinanović explained that the founders of the institute believed the crisis could only be resolved by “reading the two Books” – in other words, a critical examination of Muslim heritage coupled with a critique of modern secular thought. To that end, IIIT has advocated for reform of education in Muslim societies grounded in this integrated approach to knowledge.

=== Operation Green Quest ===
In the aftermath of the September 11 attacks, IIIT found itself targeted by the U.S. federal authorities as part of Operation Green Quest. Formed in October 2001, the operation involved an interagency task force set up to investigate the financing of Al-Qaeda and other international terrorist groups. In March 2002, the unit raided the offices of 19 Muslim charities and educational institutions. Though it confiscated a significant amount of documents and computer files, the investigation did not find any incriminating evidence – but it drew strong protests from American Muslim and civil-rights groups for the message it sent out to the American Muslim community.

=== Targeting by far-right groups ===
In 2019, investigative journalist and academic Nafeez Mosaddeq Ahmed reported that far-right Islamophobic think tanks and politicians had been agitating against American Muslim civil society groups, particularly IIIT. According to Ahmed, groups like the Center for Security Policy, Jihad Watch, and The Investigative Project on Terrorism were nodes in a network of far-right anti-Muslim organizations who were accusing Western Muslim groups of supporting terrorism and extremism.

== Activities ==
The stated goal of the institute is to conduct research, advance education in Muslim societies, and disseminate knowledge through publication, translation and teaching, with "the objectives of revival and reform of Islamic thought."

=== Islamic thought and research ===
The institute hosts scholars from across the Muslim world to examine knowledge from each academic field in the context of Islam. Ismail al-Faruqi, IIIT's co-founder, named this process “the Islamization of knowledge” (it was later renamed “the integration of knowledge” and then “unity of knowledge”). This process involved “testing every truth claim by internal coherence, correspondence with reality, and enhancement of human life and morality”, rather than the “subordination of knowledge to dogmatic principles”.

=== Education in Muslim societies ===
The institute argues for the reform of education in Muslim societies. It promotes an approach to knowledge that integrates the Qur'an with human knowledge acquired through the humanities, social and natural sciences.

== Publications ==
=== Libraries ===
IIIT’s two libraries – the Taha Jabir Al-Alwani Library and the Ismail al Faruqi Library – are featured on the Library of Congress’ list of religious collections in the area of Maryland, Virginia and the District of Columbia.

=== American Journal of Islam and Society ===
IIIT publishes the American Journal of Islam and Society (AJIS) twice a year. Launched in 1984, the journal is double-blind peer-reviewed and interdisciplinary. Before 2020, the journal was known as the American Journal of Islamic Social Sciences.

=== Books ===
In 1982, soon after its foundation, one of IIIT's first actions was to republish Trialogue of the Abrahamic Faiths. The book, authored by IIIT co-founder al-Faruqi, provided a forum for Muslim, Christian, and Jewish scholars to discuss issues of faith, modern forms of social organization like the nation state, and the role of the faith community as transnational actors for justice and peace.

== See also ==
- Ismail al-Faruqi
- Anwar Ibrahim
- Mahmoud Abu-Saud
- Jamal al Barzinji
- Taha Jabir Alalwani
- Yaqub Mirza

== Bibliography ==
- Esposito, John L. (2003). Oxford Dictionary of Islam. Oxford University Press. ISBN 9780195125580.
- Al-Faruqi, Ismaʼil R. (1995). Trialogue of the Abrahamic Faiths. Amana Publications. ISBN 0915957256.
