= Sulaiman Abdul Aziz Al Rajhi =

Saudi Arabian billionaire

Sulaiman Abdulaziz Al Rajhi
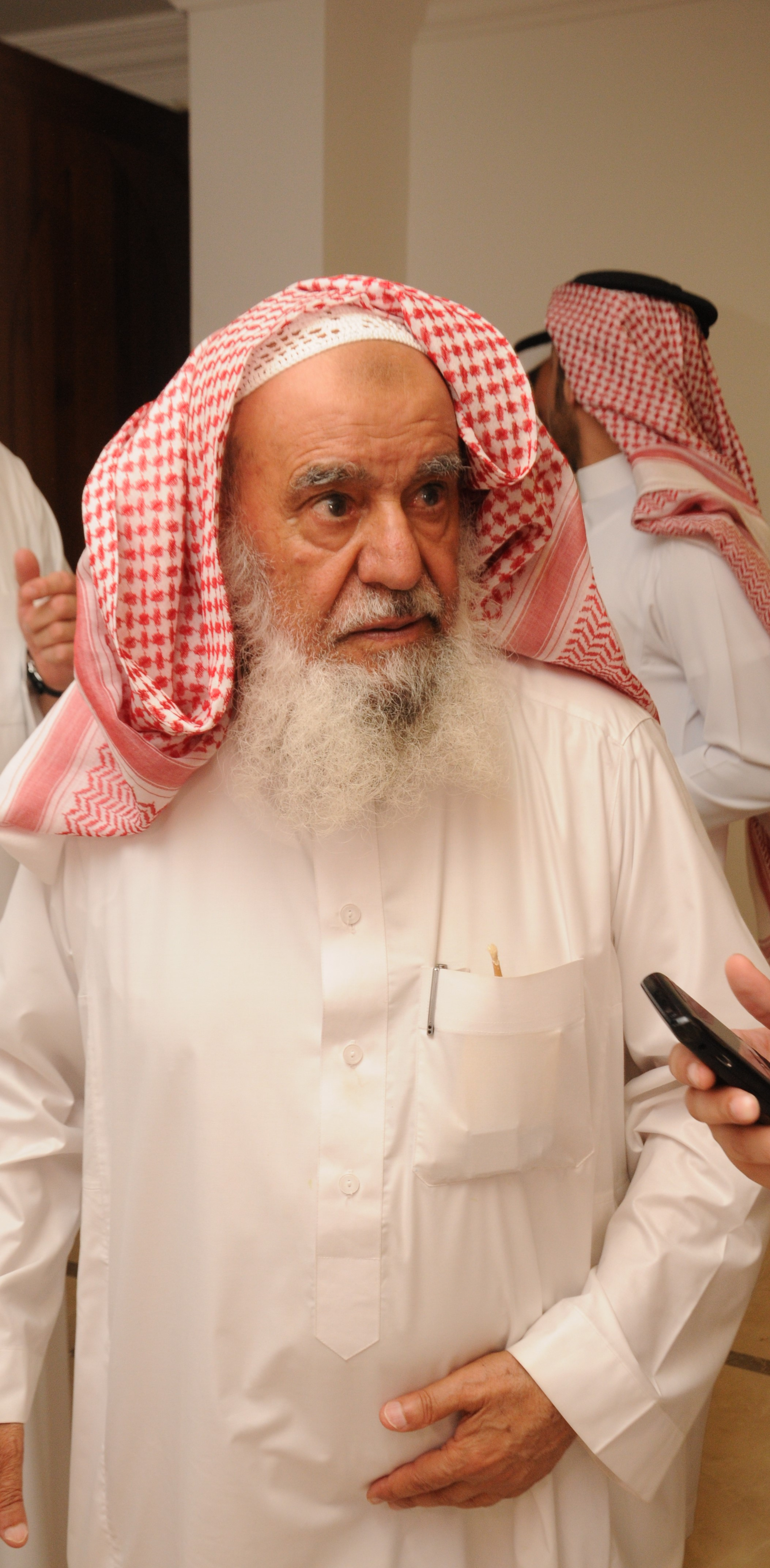
- Born: 1929 (age 96–97); Saudi Arabia

Sheikh Sulaiman bin Abdulaziz Al Rajhi (Arabic :سليمان بن عبد العزيز الراجحي, born 1929) is a Saudi Arabian businessperson. As of 2011, his wealth was estimated by Forbes to be $7.7 billion, making him the 120th richest person in the world.

He received the 2012 King Faisal International Prize for dedicating half his fortune to charity, starting an Islamic bank, supporting charity work and implementing effective national projects.

== Biography ==
Sulaiman Al Rajhi was born in Al Bukairiyah, located in Al Qassim province in Saudi Arabia, and grew up in the Nejd desert where he and his brother Saleh began their business by charging money for pilgrims taking camel caravans across the desert to the cities of Mecca and Medina.

Sulaiman Abdulaziz Al Rajhi holds the largest individual stake in his family's Al Rajhi Bank, which has consistently reported the most profitable operations amongst all of Saudi Arabia's banking groups. A co-founder of the bank, with older brother, Saleh, he is currently the chairman of what is nationally recognized as the Tadawul's most venerable institution.

The Al Rajhi brothers’ business growth and expansion was fed by the flood of migrant workers to Saudi Arabia during the 1970s oil boom. The Al Rajhis helped them send their earnings home to places like India and Pakistan. In 1983, the brothers won permission to open Saudi Arabia’s first Islamic bank, one that would observe religious tenets such as a ban on interest.

The Al Rajhi family continue to be Al Rajhi Bank's majority share holders though Sulaiman and his brothers have diversified family investments into gypsum, agriculture, steel, and other industrial sectors.

His higher educational degree was elementary degree. He lives in Saudi Arabia and has at least 23 children.

== Terrorism financing allegations ==
Following the September 11 attacks, Sulaiman bin Abdulaziz Al Rajhi came under scrutiny after his name was identified among the alleged early financial benefactors of al-Qaeda on a document known as the “Golden Chain”, reportedly seized from al-Qaeda in 1992. The U.S. Senate's 2012 investigation into HSBC's handling of money-laundering and terrorist-financing risks also discussed Al Rajhi Bank, noting allegations of links to terrorist financing and identifying Al Rajhi as an early financial benefactor of al-Qaeda.

Al Rajhi was subsequently named as a defendant in litigation brought by families and estates of September 11 victims alleging that various individuals and financial institutions had provided support to al-Qaeda. In 2013, the U.S. Court of Appeals for the Second Circuit affirmed the dismissal of the claims against Al Rajhi on the ground that the plaintiffs had failed to establish personal jurisdiction over him in the United States. The court did not make a finding that he had knowingly or intentionally supported terrorism; rather, it held that the allegations were insufficient to establish the court's jurisdiction.

== Philanthropy ==
The Al Rajhi family is considered, by most in Saudi Arabia, as the country's wealthiest non-royals, and among the world's leading philanthropists.

He established the Sulaiman Al Rajhi University in his hometown, a non profit university. The university's main focus is on health and Islamic banking, but contains other faculties as well.

In May 2011, he announced he was donating most of his $7.7 billion fortune to charity.

== See also ==
- Saleh Abdulaziz Al Rajhi
