= Mohd Amar Abdullah =

Malaysian politician and lecturer

Yang Berhormat Dato' Sri Amar D'Raja Dato' Mohd Amar Abdullah SJMK DJMK JMK MLA
- محمد عمار عبدﷲ
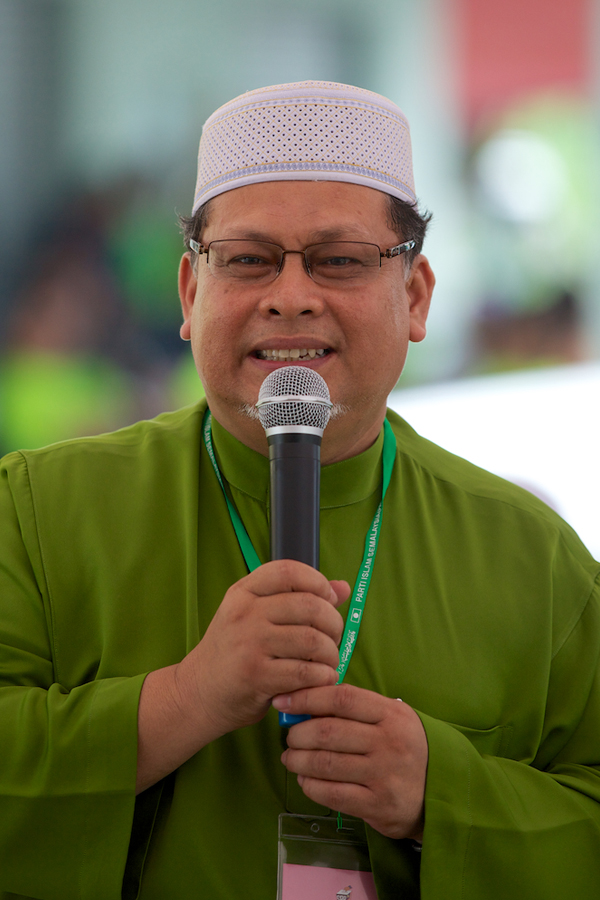

Speaker of the Kelantan State Legislative Assembly
- Incumbent
- Assumed office 5 September 2023
- Monarch: Muhammad V
- Menteri Besar: Mohd Nassuruddin Daud
- Deputy: Mohamed Farid Mohamed Zawawi
- Preceded by: Abdullah Ya'kub
- Constituency: Panchor

Deputy Menteri Besar of Kelantan
- In office 6 May 2013 – 15 August 2023
- Monarch: Muhammad V
- Menteri Besar: Ahmad Yakob
- Preceded by: Ahmad Yakob
- Succeeded by: Mohamed Fadzli Hassan
- Constituency: Panchor

Member of the Kelantan State Executive Council (Education and Information : 23 March 2004–18 March 2008) (Islamic Development, Education and Da'wah : 19 March 2008–7 May 2013) (Region Development, Land, Investment and Natural Resources : 8 May 2013–9 May 2018) (Public Administration, Regional Development, People Wellbeing and Integrity : 10 May 2018–15 August 2023)
- In office 23 March 2004 – 15 August 2023
- Monarchs: Ismail Petra (2004–2010); Muhammad V (2010–2023)
- Deputy: Muhamad Mustafa (2010–2013); Mohamad Awang (2010–2013)
- Menteri Besar: Nik Abdul Aziz Nik Mat (2004–2013); Ahmad Yakob (2013–2023)
- Preceded by: Hasan Muhammad (Education); Muhammad Daud (Information)
- Constituency: Panchor

Member of the Kelantan State Legislative Assembly for Panchor
- Incumbent
- Assumed office 21 March 2004
- Preceded by: Mohd Yusoff Ludin (PAS)
- Majority: 2,085 (2004); 3,437 (2008); 5,036 (2013); 7,288 (2018); 10,686 (2023)

Member of the Malaysian Parliament for Pengkalan Chepa
- In office 25 April 1995 – 21 March 2004
- Preceded by: Nik Abdullah Arshad (PAS)
- Succeeded by: Abdul Halim Abdul Rahman (PAS)
- Majority: 11,094 (1995); 15,945 (1999)

Vice President of the Malaysian Islamic Party
- Incumbent
- Assumed office 4 June 2015 Serving with Idris Ahmad & Iskandar Abdul Samad (until 2019) & Ahmad Samsuri Mokhtar (since 2019)
- President: Abdul Hadi Awang
- Preceded by: Tuan Ibrahim Tuan Man

Faction represented in the Kelantan State Legislative Assembly
- 2004–2020: Malaysian Islamic Party
- 2020–: Perikatan Nasional

Faction represented in Dewan Rakyat
- 1995–2004: Malaysian Islamic Party

Personal details
- Born: Mohd Amar bin Abdullah; 29 July 1959 (age 67) Kota Bharu, Kelantan, Federation of Malaya
- Citizenship: Malaysia
- Party: Malaysian Islamic Party (PAS)
- Other political affiliations: Barisan Alternatif (BA) (1999–2004); Pakatan Rakyat (PR) (2008–2015); Gagasan Sejahtera (GS) (2016–2020); Perikatan Nasional (PN) (since 2020)
- Spouse: Hasmani Hussain
- Children: 4
- Parent(s): Abdullah Arshad; Tengku Chik Tengku Ibrahim
- Education: National University of Malaysia; University of Birmingham
- Occupation: Politician
- Profession: Lecturer

Mohd Amar bin Abdullah (born 29 July 1959) is a Malaysian politician and lecturer who has served as Speaker of the Kelantan State Legislative Assembly since September 2023 and Member of the Kelantan State Legislative Assembly (MLA) for Panchor since March 2004. He served as the Deputy Menteri Besar of Kelantan and Member of the Kelantan State Executive Council (EXCO) in the Pakatan Rakyat (PR), Gagasan Sejahtera (GS) and Perikatan Nasional (PN) state administrations under Menteris Besar Nik Abdul Aziz Nik Mat and Ahmad Yakob from May 2013 and from March 2004 to August 2023 respectively as well as the Member of Parliament (MP) for Pengkalan Chepa from April 1995 to March 2004. He is a member and one of the Vice Presidents of the Malaysian Islamic Party (PAS), a component party of the PN, formerly PR, GS, Barisan Alternatif (BA) and Angkatan Perpaduan Ummah (APU) coalitions.

== Family background ==
Amar is the eldest child of Abdullah bin Arshad (known as Pak Nik Lah) and Tengku Chik binti Tengku Ibrahim. Amar's mother was the great-granddaughter of Sultan Muhammad III through his grandmother Tengku Halimah binti Tengku Long Zainal Abidin ibni Sultan Muhammad III.

Amar has 4 children (2 sons and 2 daughters) as a result of his marriage with Hasmani Binti Hussain.

== Education ==
Amar was educated by his father and lived together and received his early education at Sekolah Menengah Ugama (Agama) Tarbiah Mardhiah, Panchor. At the same time Amar studied in Sekolah Melayu Council (1965 - 1971) and proceed to the Master of Philosophy (MPhil) in United Kingdom.

- 1965 - 1971 : Sekolah Melayu Majlis - Primary School
- 1972 - 1977 : SMU (A) Tarbiah Mardhiah - Secondary School (Lower 6)
- 1978 - 1979 : Maahad Muhammadi Men - Secondary School (Upper 6)
- 1979 - 1983 : Universiti Kebangsaan Malaysia (UKM) - Bachelor of Islamic Studies
- 1985 - 1988 : University of Birmingham, UK - MPhil in Theological Studies

== Career and politics ==
Amar was a lecturer in the Department of Revelation, International Islamic University Malaysia (IIUM), Petaling Jaya, Selangor and served for 10 years (1985-1995). He also previously served as the Superintendent of Customs (Sangkut) for a year in Penang. He was subsequently called by the PAS Kelantan leadership to contest in the Pengkalan Chepa parliamentary seat and then contest as Panchor MLA until now.

On 5 September 2023, Amar, after leaving the Kelantan state government as the Deputy Menteri Besar and EXCO Member, was appointed as the Speaker of the Kelantan Assembly. As Speaker, Amar vacated the Nenggiri state seat held and represented by its MLA Mohd Azizi Abu Naim of PN and the Malaysian United Indigenous Party (BERSATU) at the Kelantan state level, who was also the Gua Musang MP in the opposition at the federal level, who declared his support for the federal government and Prime Minister Anwar Ibrahim. His support was a switch of political allegiance as Pakatan Harapan (PH) led by Anwar and PN were opposing politically at both levels. Mohd Amar declared the vacancy of the Nenggiri state seat on 19 June 2024 that led to the 2024 Nenggiri by-election after Azizi was terminated as a BERSATU member due to his switch of political allegiance. Azizi had challenged the decision of Mohd Amar by filing an interim injunction but it was dismissed by the High Court.

== Election results ==
Parliament of Malaysia
Year	Constituency	Candidate	Votes	Pct	Opponent(s)	Votes	Pct	Ballots cast	Majority	Turnout
1995	P020 Pengkalan Chepa	Mohd Amar Abdullah (PAS)	20,410	68.15%	Ismail Mat (UMNO)	9,316	31.11%	35,198	11,094	83.28%
1995	P020 Pengkalan Chepa	Mohd Amar Abdullah (PAS)	20,410	68.15%	Yusof Mat (AKIM)	221	0.74%	35,198	11,094	83.28%
1999	P020 Pengkalan Chepa	Mohd Amar Abdullah (PAS)	23,765	75.24%	Mohd Noor Deris (UMNO)	7,820	24.76%	32,749	15,945	76.50%

Kelantan State Legislative Assembly
Year	Constituency	Candidate	Votes	Pct	Opponent(s)	Votes	Pct	Ballots cast	Majority	Turnout
2004	N07 Panchor	Mohd Amar Abdullah (PAS)	7,123	58.57%	Zulkifli Dollah (UMNO)	5,038	41.43%	12,492	2,085	80.11%
2008	N07 Panchor	Mohd Amar Abdullah (PAS)	9,148	61.57%	Dali Husin (UMNO)	5,711	38.43%	15,194	3,437	83.18%
2013	N07 Panchor	Mohd Amar Abdullah (PAS)	12,467	62.65%	Che Rosli Hassan (UMNO)	7,431	37.35%	20,107	5,036	85.10%
2023	N07 Panchor	Mohd Amar Abdullah (PAS)	18,700	70.00%	Syed Mohd Alidustur Syed Mohd Zain (PKR)	8,014	30.00%	26,714	10,686	62.46%

== Honours ==
- Kelantan
  - Dato' Sri Amar D'Raja (2023)
  - Knight Grand Commander of the Order of the Life of the Crown of Kelantan (SJMK) – Dato' (2015)
  - Knight Commander of the Order of the Life of the Crown of Kelantan (DJMK) – Dato' (2009)
  - Companion of the Order of the Life of the Crown of Kelantan (JMK) (2006)
