= Tengku Razaleigh Hamzah =

Malaysian politician (born 1937)

Yang Mulia Tan Sri Dato' Sri Tengku Razaleigh Hamzah DK (Kelantan) PSM SPMS SSAP
- تڠكو غزالي حمزة

Ministerial roles
- 1976–1984: Minister of Finance
- 1984–1987: Minister of Trade and Industry

Faction represented in Dewan Rakyat
- 1974–1989: Barisan Nasional
- 1989–1996: Parti Melayu Semangat 46
- 1996–2022: Barisan Nasional

Faction represented in Kelantan State Legislative Assembly
- 1969–1974: Alliance Party
- 1974: Barisan Nasional

Other roles
- 1965–1970: Founding Executive Director of the Bank Bumiputera Malaysia Berhad
- 1970–1976: Chairman & Managing Director of the Bank Bumiputera Malaysia Berhad
- 1970–1974: Chairman of the National Corporation
- 1974–1976: Founding Chairman & Chief Executive Petronas
- 1976–1977: Chairman of the Asian Development Bank
- 1977–1978: Chairman of the 33rd Board of Governors of the World Bank and International Monetary Fund
- 1978–1979: Chairman of the Islamic Development Bank

Personal details
- Born: Tengku Razaleigh bin Tengku Mohd Hamzah; 13 April 1937 (age 89) Kota Bharu, Kelantan, Unfederated Malay States, British Malaya (now Malaysia)
- Citizenship: Malaysian
- Party: United Malays National Organisation (UMNO) (1962–1988; 1996–present); Parti Melayu Semangat 46 (S46) (1989–1996)
- Other political affiliations: Barisan Nasional (BN) (1962–1988; 1996–present); Gagasan Rakyat (GR) (1990–1996); Angkatan Perpaduan Ummah (APU) (1990–1996)
- Spouses: Cik Puan Noor Yvonne Abdullah née Yvonne Law (m. 1993; died 2015); Cik Puan Alfia Reziani (m. 2026)
- Relations: Sultan Muhammad V (grandnephew)
- Relatives: Tengku Abdul Aziz (brother)
- Education: Queen's University Belfast
- Occupation: Politician

Tengku Razaleigh bin Tengku Mohd Hamzah (Jawi: تڠکو غزالي بن تڠکو محمد حمزة; born 13 April 1937) is a Malaysian politician who served as the Member of Parliament (MP) for Gua Musang from August 1986 to November 2022 and for Ulu Kelantan from August 1974 to August 1986. He is the longest-serving MP to date, serving from 1974 until 2022, for 48 years in a row. He is sometimes referred to as the Father of Malaysian Economic Development for playing a pivotal role in establishing and implementing key foundations and policies in Malaysian economy. A descendant of Malay royalty, he is a great-uncle of the current Sultan of Kelantan, Sultan Muhammad V.

He was the Minister of Finance (1976–1984), Minister of International Trade and Industry (1984–1987), former chairman of Asian Development Bank, former chairman of Islamic Development Bank, founding chairman and Chief Executive of Malaysian oil company, Petronas, and chairman of the 33rd Board of Governors of the World Bank and IMF. His popularity has earned him nicknames such as "The People's Prince" and "Ku Kita" (Our Tengku). He is affectionately known as Ku Li, derived from the last syllables of Tengku Razaleigh; a common custom in the Kelantan dialect.

== Early life and education ==
Razaleigh was born on 13 April 1937 in Kota Bharu to Tengku Sri Maharaja Tengku Muhammad Hamzah Ibni Almarhum Raja Dewa Tengku Zainal Abidin, who was once the Menteri Besar of Kelantan. Razaleigh was educated at English-medium schools and attended Sultan Ismail College before moving on to the Malay College Kuala Kangsar (MCKK). He left MCKK disliking the boarding school environment there, and transferred to Anderson School in Ipoh, Perak. He received a Bachelor of Science in economics from the Queen's University of Belfast in 1959 and later pursued a law degree at Lincoln's Inn. However, upon his father's death, he was forced to return and never continued his studies.

Razaleigh took over the family business, and then joined the United Malays National Organisation (UMNO).

== Involvement in Malaysia's economic development ==
Starting from the mid-1960s, with the support of then Prime Ministers Tunku Abdul Rahman and Abdul Razak Hussein, several initiatives were launched to increase Malaysia's economic growth. Being a favourite of both leaders, Razaleigh was hand-picked to fulfill many of these initiatives. This included major corporate takeovers of foreign conglomerates and industries which were previously foreign-owned.

=== Bank Bumiputra Malaysia Berhad ===
On 4 June 1965, "Kongres Ekonomi Bumiputra" (Bumiputra Economic Congress), sponsored by the Ministry of National and Rural Development, was held in Kuala Lumpur for 3 days to generate an interest among Malays and other local indigenous groups to participate in commerce and industry. Seven working committees were formed to achieve these objectives.

Tun Abdul Razak, the then deputy prime minister of Malaysia, announced that the Government had agreed to form a local Bank ("Bank Bumiputra") as recommended by the Economic Congress based on a majority of the 69 resolutions passed in the meeting. The Bank, with its initial capital to be provided by the Malaysian Government, would be established. The bank's ownership would ultimately be sold to the public through shares. On 15 July 1965, Abdul Razak announced the Government's decision to provide $5 million as the initial capital for Bank Bumiputra. He stated that the bank's main function was to assist rural businessmen in the form of loans.

Bank Bumiputra Malaysia Berhad was formally launched by Tun Abdul Razak on 1 October 1965 with authorised capital of $25 million, instead of the $5 million announced earlier. The senior management was headed by Mohd Raslan bin Dato' Abdullah as managing director and Tengku Razaleigh as executive director. The other board members include S.O.K. Ubaidulla (president of the United Chamber of Commerce), L.E Osman, K. Mushir Ariff, Wan Yahya bin Haji Mohamad, K.D. Eu and Kuok Hock Nien. The general manager of the bank was Wong Aun Pui, a prominent local banker with 20 years of experience and director of many rubber and palm oil companies.

In 1999, Bank Bumiputra was merged into Bumiputra-Commerce Holdings (which is the listed vehicle for CIMB Group).

=== Perbadanan Nasional Berhad (PERNAS) ===
PERNAS (Perbadanan Nasional Berhad or National Corporation) was set up in November 1969 as a wholly owned government company to carry out the resolutions at the Second Bumiputera Economic Congress. Among the major shareholders were the Ministry of Finance, Bank Negara Malaysia (The Central Bank of Malaysia) and Bank Bumiputera Malaysia Berhad. Pernas was put under a solid footing under the chairmanship of Razaleigh (1970–1974).

In view of the very low participation of Bumiputeras in the private sector and industries at the time, PERNAS' principles were to:

- enter undertakings which would bring high economic returns,
- enter into joint ventures where PERNAS was to be the majority shareholder with controlling interest over operations,
- employ Bumiputeras at all levels of operations and undertakings.

To achieve its objectives, many subsidiaries were subsequently set up. The first of which was Malaysia National Insurance Berhad (MNI), which was established in April 1970. This was followed with Pernas Construction Sdn Bhd, Pernas Engineering Sdn Bhd, and Pernas Securities Sdn Bhd. In 1973, Pernas Mining Sdn Bhd was set up and in the following year, Pernas Edar Sdn Bhd.

Razaleigh became involved in what became known as the Haw Par imbroglio of the mid-1970s, working in concert with the Singapore-based Haw Par Brothers International Ltd, then one of the subsidiaries under the control of British wheeler-dealer Jim Slater, to acquire control of the British-owned tin conglomerate known as the London Tin Company, and the plantations conglomerate Sime Darby. This was to be achieved through a web of transactions in which both would end up in the control of PERNAS. Things came to a standstill when Singapore accused Haw Par of financial irregularities and later jailed a senior executive.

But this proved a short-lived setback for Razaleigh. Within two years, he enlisted the help of the merchant bank Rothschild – which was also a part owner of Bumiputera Merchant Bankers – to engage in a share and proxy battle to wrest Sime Darby from British control and shift its headquarters to Kuala Lumpur. Control of the London Tin Company soon followed. In 1979, another takeover attempt was made to achieve control of Kumpulan Guthrie Bhd, when Malaysian money made a "dawn raid" on the plantation giant; this helped to kickstart a "domino effect" which sealed the fates of most other foreign owned plantations.

Among the major corporate takeover exercise and formation of new businesses during Razaleigh's stewardship as Pernas chairman were

- Insurance – Malaysia National Insurance Bhd,
- Banking – Maybank Bhd,
- Mining – the then-largest tin mining company in the world, London Tin Company, which was later renamed MMC Corporation Berhad.
- Palm Oil and Rubber Producer – Sime Darby, Guthrie Berhad, Highlands & Lowlands Berhad.

In 1971, Razaleigh led a trade delegation to China to initiate a prospect of a business relationship. During the visit to China, Razaleigh was granted a meeting with China's then Premier Zhou Enlai. In 1971, total trade with China stood at a mere RM105.6 million. By 1980, this ballooned to RM1.6 billion. Since then, the contact between the two countries has steadily increased.

=== Fleet Holdings ===
Fleet Holdings was created to reduce UMNO's financial dependence on non-Malay supporters, such as Chinese businessmen, and to break the foreign hold over Malaysia's media companies.

The Youth division of UMNO had protested strongly about foreign control over the Malaysian publishing media and passed a resolution requesting the then prime minister, Tun Abdul Razak, to obtain control of the publishing company, the Straits Times Press.

As a result, Fleet Holdings Sdn Bhd was formed in 1972 by Razaleigh as the Treasurer of UMNO on the instructions of Tun Abdul Razak. This company was started with Razaleigh's own money and its purpose was to take control of the local media not just in the form of capital, but in management terms as well.

In the year that it commenced operations, Fleet Holdings paid RM32 million to control 80% of the Straits Times Press (later renamed New Straits Times Press). After its successful venture in media, Fleet Holdings expanded into other fields, including banking, car rental, leasing, communications, filming, insurance, and others. When Razaleigh gave up control of the company in 1983, total asset value of Fleet Holdings stood at more than RM500 million with liabilities amounting to only RM56 million. By 1987 however, liabilities exceeded RM448 million and the company was struggling to service its monthly interest payments of RM3 million. Fleet Holdings became the subject of a bitter dispute between Mahathir and Razaleigh before the UMNO party's split.

Through Fleet Group, UMNO held substantial stakes in Bursa Malaysia listed companies, including The New Straits Times Press (M) Bhd, Time Engineering Bhd (now known as Dagang NeXchange Bhd), Bank of Commerce Bhd, Commerce International Merchant Bankers Bhd (both banks later subsumed into CIMB Group) and Faber Group Bhd (now known as UEM Edgenta). Many of the assets have since been sold to government investment companies and other investors.

=== Petroliam Nasional Berhad (Petronas) ===
Due to a dispute between the Sarawak Chief Minister Abdul Rahman Ya'kub and his nephew Abdul Taib Mahmud (at the time the Federal Natural Resources Minister) over oil rights, then Prime Minister Abdul Razak dispatched Razaleigh to visit Rahman at the latter's private residence. Razaleigh suggested the formation of a company instead of a statutory body where the former would distribute profits equally between the Federal and the State governments. Rahman was agreeable to this proposal. Upon Razaleigh's return to Kuala Lumpur, the Prime Minister tasked him with drafting, in secret, the Petroleum Development Act to be completed before the 1974 Malaysian general election. Rahman was in regular contact with Razaleigh to ask for updates about the terms offered by the Federal government. Razaleigh told Rahman about the abolishment of the concessions system and that 5% of oil revenues will be redirected back to the respective oil-producing States as royalty payments. A similar amount would go to the Federal government. Rahman considered this a fair deal and gave his blessings.

While all other oil-producing States in Malaysia signed the petroleum agreement, Tun Mustapha, the chief minister of Sabah, stubbornly refused, complaining of the meagre 5% oil royalty. Mustapha requested for 10-20% of revenue as royalty, failing which he would pull Sabah out of Malaysia. However, Razaleigh refused to budge. This left the Malaysian Federal government with no choice but to make another deal with Harris Salleh (who was out of favour with Tun Mustapha) to establish the political party Parti Bersatu Rakyat Jelata Sabah (BERJAYA) and try to oust Mustapha out of power. However, Harris was reluctant to become the Chief Minister of Sabah and so Fuad Stephens was asked to assume the post of Chief Minister were BERJAYA to succeed. In the 1976 Sabah State elections, Tun Mustapha was successfully ousted by BERJAYA and Stephens was installed as Chief Minister in his place. Unfortunately, Stephens did not complete his term as he, along with five other State Ministers, died in the 1976 air crash. Harris replaced Stephens, and a week later, the oil agreement was signed. With Sabah entering into the agreement, Petronas had finally achieved total control of all oil and gas reserves in Malaysia.

In 1974, the Petroleum Development Act was tabled in Parliament and then approved. Petronas (Petroliam Nasional Berhad) was incorporated on 17 August 1974. On 6 September 1974, Prime Minister Abdul Razak announced the appointment of Razaleigh as chairman and Chief Executive of Petronas. Razak said: "From among the new blood, I intended to bring Tengku Razaleigh into the Cabinet. However, I have an important job for him, a job as important as that of a Cabinet Minister. I have decided to appoint him as chairman and Chief Executive of Petronas, which is equivalent to being a Cabinet Minister." Subsequently, Razaleigh had to relinquish his job as Chairman of PERNAS which he held from 1970, but retained the chairmanship of Bank Bumiputra.

Initially, Exxon and Shell refused to surrender their concessions and negotiate with Petronas. Owing to this tough stance, Razaleigh served a notice to all foreign oil companies that after 1 April 1975, they would be operating illegally in Malaysian waters if they do not start negotiating with Petronas. After many months of discussions, foreign oil companies surrendered their concessions to Petronas.

=== Permodalan Nasional Berhad (PNB) ===
The company was founded on 17 March 1978 based on an idea from Tengku Razaleigh Hamzah, as an instrument of the Government's New Economic Policy to promote share ownership among the Bumiputera, and to develop opportunities for deserving Bumiputera professionals to participate in the creation and management of wealth.

Today, PNB is a major investor in Bursa Malaysia, investing nearly 10% of the market capitalisation of the bourse, across most major Malaysian corporations and also actively contributing towards the nation's human capital development through scholarships and employment opportunities.

=== Setting up banking firms and other institutions ===
He also set up Bank Pembangunan Malaysia and founded and established both Bank Islam and Syarikat Takaful, an insurance company run in accordance with Syariah principles.

Institute of Marketing Malaysia (IMM) was founded by Razaleigh in 1977 and he became the institute's first Patron.

=== Malaysian and ASEAN Chamber of Commerce ===
Razaleigh was President of the Malay Chamber of Commerce and Industry, Malaysian Chamber of Commerce and Industry and consequently the President of the ASEAN Chamber of Commerce and Industry. He played a major role in the strategic restructuring of the Malaysian economy. The Malaysian Chamber of Commerce acknowledged his expertise in the petroleum business and once called him the "Malaysian Oil Prince." In the 1975 Malaysian Chamber of Commerce resolution, Razaleigh was named "Father of Malaysian Economic Development."

== Political career ==
=== Joining UMNO ===
As the former president of the Malayan Students Union in London and the secretary of the Malay Society in Britain, Razaleigh has been in politics since the early 60s. He formally joined UMNO in 1962 and was unanimously elected the chairman of UMNO's Ulu Kelantan Division at its annual general meeting. He had returned to Malaya earlier that year to attend his father's funeral. A few months later, Razaleigh was chosen to be a part of Malaya's delegation to the United Nations for the 17th Session of the U.N. General Assembly in 1962. The leader of the delegation was Ismail Abdul Rahman, the then Minister of Internal Security.

Tunku Abdul Rahman was a very close friend of Razaleigh's father as they shared similar backgrounds, both were from Royal houses. This closeness is also the result of their involvement in politics and their struggle for Malaya's independence. The Tunku saw leadership potential in Razaleigh and after Razaleigh's father had passed on, the Tunku sought to have him compete for a seat on the UMNO ticket. However, Razaleigh resisted the offers presented to him as he wanted to focus on his fledgling business career.

This came to a head several years later when Razaleigh finally gave in after he had learned from various quarters that the Tunku had lost patience with him for stalling. He competed in the 1969 general election and won Kelantan State Legislative Assembly seat of Ulu Kelantan Barat.

In 1971, he was elected to the UMNO Supreme Council. Besides Musa Hitam and Prof. Abdul Jalil Hassan, he was among the 7 new faces in the Supreme Council. He was later appointed the Treasurer of UMNO by then President Abdul Razak Hussein in 1973.

In the 1974 general election, Razaleigh won the Parliamentary seat of Ulu Kelantan then (now known as, Gua Musang). In 1975, he secured the second most votes for the Vice President post in the party elections and thus was one of the three VPs elected to serve a three-year term.

In 1976, after the death of Prime Minister Tun Abdul Razak, Razaleigh became the Minister of Finance. At the time, Razaleigh had gotten a reputation for being an ultra nationalist due to his hard line stance in the negotiations for Petronas' oil rights with the Americans. Eventually, Razaleigh did relinquish his positions in Petronas as he was juggling between many different jobs which prohibited him from focusing on his main role as Finance Minister.

Razaleigh's planning is reputed to have been the main reason the Barisan Nasional (BN) coalition, of which UMNO is a major component, almost totally defeats the opposition Islamic party of Pan-Malaysian Islamic Party (PAS) in the 1978 general election and the Kelantan state elections of the same year. In an election where few observers were willing to predict the outcome, a decisive victory for UMNO in Kelantan both at the Federal and State level meant that Razaleigh had solidified his position as one of the foremost political personalities on the national stage. This was reflected in the UMNO elections that year when he garnered the most votes for the Vice President post and was reelected to another three-year term. Razaleigh's strong position led to him being widely tipped to eventually become Prime Minister of Malaysia.

In 1981, Mahathir became prime minister. Instead of sticking to the original agreement he had made with Razaleigh, Mahathir declared an election for the Deputy Premiership to be decided through the results of the UMNO Deputy Presidency. The new prime minister announced that he would not endorse any candidate and would take a neutral stance. Razaleigh sensed that Mahathir was averse to having him as his Deputy per their earlier understanding, but welcomed this decision nonetheless. His main quibble was that this was not in accordance with tradition, as Deputy Prime Ministers are usually hand-picked by the Prime Minister. Razaleigh joined the contest, and his main opposition was Musa Hitam. Eventually, Musa won the election with 722 votes to Razaleigh's 517, becoming the new Deputy President of UMNO and leading to his appointment as Deputy Prime Minister. Razaleigh blamed himself for taking "a rather passive stance" and not having a campaign strategy. Meanwhile, Mahathir had maintained Razaleigh as Finance Minister until he was made the Minister of International Trade and Industry in a 1984 cabinet reshuffle.

=== Exit from UMNO and formation of Semangat 46 ===
Tengku Razaleigh challenged Mahathir in the 1987 UMNO leadership election, teaming up with former Deputy Prime Minister Musa Hitam, who had in the year prior resigned from Mahathir's cabinet owing to some conflict with the Prime Minister. Mahathir's then Deputy Prime Minister, Ghafar Baba, contested against Musa for the Deputy Presidency. This led to UMNO being split into two camps, i.e. "Team A" and "Team B" with Mahathir and Razaleigh as leaders of the respective camps. Mahathir managed to retain his party president position by a mere 43 votes and Musa lost by 40 votes. The election was held on a Friday, and coinciding with the Friday prayers, it is alleged that many used this opportunity to "buy" votes from delegates in order to have them cast a vote for their leader.

There were many who changed camps at the last minute, including Najib Razak who was then the leader of UMNO's Youth Wing, who ended up endorsing Mahathir. It has also been alleged by Razaleigh's camp that while the votes were being counted and Razaleigh was leading, a "black-out" had suddenly occurred whereby the room lost electricity. This was especially curious as the rooms adjacent to where the votes were being counted did not experience the same. After the electric power was back on, Razaleigh's lead was slowly erased and Mahathir was eventually declared the winner.

This left Razaleigh and his Team B supporters unsatisfied. A few Team B leaders had claimed many party delegates were improperly elected. They eventually took UMNO to court and filed suit to overturn the election after finding discrepancies throughout the voting process. The courts found that some of the delegates that voted were ineligible and UMNO was thus declared illegal on technical grounds in 1988. Despite Mahathir's camp blaming Razaleigh for UMNO being declared an unlawful party although Razaleigh was not among the twelve plaintiffs, he was widely believed to be funding and co-ordinating the suit. The event did not please Mahathir began making heated attacks on the judiciary and it was considered a judicial intervention of the political dispute triggering the 1988 Malaysian constitutional crisis. Mahathir immediately reconstituted UMNO as UMNO Baru (New UMNO), with only Team A members. Most of its leaders, however, were selected from Team A of the old UMNO, with Team B ignored. UMNO Baru was later announced the de facto and de jure party to succeed its predecessor, the original but 'illegal' UMNO, dropping the 'Baru' suffix and have the old UMNO's assets transferred over too.

Razaleigh and his supporters which constituted Team B, had faced difficulties to register as members of Team A's newly formed UMNO Baru. With the personal support of former UMNO prime ministers Tunku Abdul Rahman, Razaleigh who had also failed registering "UMNO 46" had founded a new political party called Parti Melayu Semangat 46 (S46 or Semangat 46) instead. The number 46 refers to the year the original UMNO was founded. On 3 June 1989, Semangat 46 was officially registered with the electoral college. Among notable leaders that joined Semangat 46 were including Marina Yusoff, Ilyani Ishak, Rais Yatim, Harun Idris, Suhaimi Kamaruddin, Ahmad Shabery Cheek, Othman Saat, Salleh Abas, Mohd Radzi Sheikh Ahmad, Tengku Azlan Sultan Abu Bakar and Ibrahim Ali. In 1990, Semangat 46 also formed Gagasan Rakyat (GR) and Angkatan Perpaduan Ummah (APU) opposition coalitions.

In the 1993 Malaysian constitutional crisis, Razaleigh strongly opposed the amendment for Rulers to be tried at court and their legal immunity be stripped. However, his efforts failed to bear fruit as it did not gain enough support. In 1996, Tengku Razaleigh disbanded Semangat 46 and rejoined UMNO.

=== Return to UMNO ===
Tengku Razaleigh return to UMNO as he has discussed earlier with Mahathir after the dissolution of Semangat 46 in 1996. Mahathir dismissed allegations that he brought Razaleigh back to check the influence of Anwar Ibrahim in the party and government.

As Anwar was sacked from UMNO in 1998, Mahathir himself brought Razaleigh back into the limelight again in June 1999 by making him the UMNO Kelantan liaison chief, a job the PM had held himself since 1987, Razaleigh could well been Mahathir's heir apparent if he had defeated PAS and won his home state.

In 2004, he announced his interest for the UMNO top post yet again but failed to garner enough nominations to contest the presidency. In 2008, Razaleigh had again expressed his interest in becoming prime minister, hoping to replace Abdullah Ahmad Badawi. However, his movement also did not get enough traction to seriously contest against Najib Razak for the post.

On 22 July 2011, Razaleigh launched a non-Government Organisation (NGO), Angkatan Amanah Merdeka (Amanah), at Memorial Tunku Abdul Rahman to revive and restore the spirit of Merdeka among Malaysians. The aim of NGO led by Razaleigh himself, along with several other political figures and prominent activists were dubious and some have demanded it transforms to a political party and join the opposition in the coming general election.

After the 2018 general election (GE14) which see the downfall of BN federal government and Najib's resignation as President of UMNO, Razaleigh contested the post of party president for a second time in the 2018 UMNO leadership election but lost to former Deputy Prime Minister Ahmad Zahid Hamidi in a three-corner fight along with former Youth chief Khairy Jamaluddin.

He was made the Chairman of the Advisory Council of UMNO afterwards. Razaleigh somehow had sent the resignation letter from the UMNO post dated 20 September 2021 to the party caretaker President Ahmad Zahid, expressing his dissatisfaction and disappointment of the political cooperation between UMNO and the Malaysian United Indigenous Party (BERSATU) in collaborating a failed government.

== In popular culture ==
Razaleigh is one of many Malaysian politicians, celebrities, and other well-known personalities who appear in Pete Teo and Namewee's public service announcement voter education video "Undilah" on YouTube, released in 2011. Razaleigh provides a spoken word introduction to the rap song.

In conjunction with the 50th anniversary of the formation of Malaysia, Pete Teo released the video "Hari Malaysia", featuring many public figures and well-known personalities. Razaleigh was seen sitting next to Lim Kit Siang, another Malaysian prominent political figure, in Merdeka Stadium.

== Personal life ==
Razaleigh married his longtime friend, former Malaysia Airlines executive Yvonne Law, an ethnic Chinese, who changed her name to Noor Yvonne Abdullah after her conversion to Islam then. While being out of the limelight and shying away from the public, she was married to him since 9 December 1993. She died on 5 June 2015 due to multiple myeloma, a blood cancer disease she had been suffering from for the previous year.

In 2026, Razaleigh married Alfia Reziani, an Indonesian politician and former member of the House of Representatives representing Central Java for the Indonesian Democratic Party of Struggle.

== Election results ==
Kelantan State Legislative Assembly
Year	Constituency	Candidate	Votes	Pct	Opponent(s)	Votes	Pct	Ballots cast	Majority	Turnout
1969	N30 Ulu Kelantan Barat	Tengku Razaleigh Hamzah (UMNO)	4,061	63.57%	Hussin Abdullah (PAS)	2,327	36.43%	N/A	1,734	N/A

Parliament of Malaysia
Year	Constituency	Candidate	Votes	Pct	Opponent(s)	Votes	Pct	Ballots cast	Majority	Turnout
1974	P027 Ulu Kelantan	Tengku Razaleigh Hamzah (UMNO)	Unopposed							
1978	P027 Ulu Kelantan	Tengku Razaleigh Hamzah (UMNO)	10,267	64.28%	Khaidir Khatib (PAS)	5,705	35.72%	N/A	4,562	N/A
1982	P027 Ulu Kelantan	Tengku Razaleigh Hamzah (UMNO)	15,573	61.35%	Hassan Mat Saman (PAS)	9,810	38.65%	26,100	5,763	80.68%
1986	P029 Gua Musang	Tengku Razaleigh Hamzah (UMNO)	12,538	70.61%	Wan Abdul Rahim Wan Abdullah (PAS)	5,219	29.39%	18,250	7,319	76.11%
1990	P029 Gua Musang	Tengku Razaleigh Hamzah (S46)	18,973	76.82%	Wan Ismail Ibrahim (UMNO)	5,724	23.18%	25,172	13,249	81.03%
1995	P029 Gua Musang	Tengku Razaleigh Hamzah (S46)	13,716	74.33%	Nik Ismail Wan Idris (AKIM)	4,736	25.67%	21,671	8,980	77.11%
1995	P029 Gua Musang	Tengku Razaleigh Hamzah (S46)^{1}	13,144	61.02%	Hussein Ahmad (UMNO)	8,398	38.98%	21,765	4,746	77.72%
1999	P029 Gua Musang	Tengku Razaleigh Hamzah (UMNO)	12,825	56.44%	Razak Abas (PAS)	9,900	43.56%	23,176	2,925	77.54%
2004	P032 Gua Musang	Tengku Razaleigh Hamzah (UMNO)	13,570	66.06%	Zulkefli Mohamad (PAS)	6,972	33.94%	21,076	6,598	80.64%
2008	P032 Gua Musang	Tengku Razaleigh Hamzah (UMNO)	14,063	59.10%	Zulkefli Mohamad (PAS)	9,669	40.64%	24,283	4,394	83.77%
2013	P032 Gua Musang	Tengku Razaleigh Hamzah (UMNO)	21,367	62.14%	Wan Abdul Rahim Wan Abdullah (PAS)	12,954	37.67%	35,097	8,413	87.36%
2018	P032 Gua Musang	Tengku Razaleigh Hamzah (UMNO)	19,426	48.64%	Abdullah Hussein (PAS)	15,513	38.84%	41,206	3,913	78.45%
2018	P032 Gua Musang	Tengku Razaleigh Hamzah (UMNO)	19,426	48.64%	Mohd Nor Hussin (BERSATU)	4,997	12.51%	41,206	3,913	78.45%
2022	P032 Gua Musang	Tengku Razaleigh Hamzah (UMNO)	21,663	44.78%	Mohd Azizi Abu Naim (BERSATU)	21,826	45.12%	48,337	163	68.86%
2022	P032 Gua Musang	Tengku Razaleigh Hamzah (UMNO)	21,663	44.78%	Asharun Aji (PKR)	4,517	9.34%	48,337	163	68.86%
2022	P032 Gua Musang	Tengku Razaleigh Hamzah (UMNO)	21,663	44.78%	Samsu Abdadi Mamat (PEJUANG)	371	0.77%	48,337	163	68.86%

Note: ^{1} On 1 August 1995, the Kota Bharu High Court ordered a fresh election for the Gua Musang Parliamentary Seat after declaring the contest in the 8th General Election held in April the same year earlier null and void. Tengku Razaleigh Hamzah was the incumbent MP.

== Honours ==
=== Honours of Malaysia ===
- Malaysia
  - Commander of the Order of Loyalty to the Crown of Malaysia (PSM) – Tan Sri (1973)
- Kelantan
  - Recipient of the Royal Family Order of Kelantan (DK) (1978, revoked 2 December 2010 and reinstated June 2018)
  - Knight Grand Commander of the Order of the Crown of Kelantan (SPMK) – Dato' (1967, revoked 2 December 2010)
- Pahang
  - Knight Grand Companion of the Order of Sultan Ahmad Shah of Pahang (SSAP) – Dato' Sri (1980)
- Selangor
  - Knight Grand Commander of the Order of the Crown of Selangor (SPMS) – Dato' Seri (1982)

== See also ==
- Ulu Kelantan (federal constituency)
- Gua Musang (federal constituency)
- Parti Melayu Semangat 46
- Gagasan Rakyat
- Angkatan Perpaduan Ummah

== Notes and references ==
=== Other references ===
- Kamarudin, Raja Petra (9 November 2005). "The Anwar Factor". Malaysia Today.
