= Mohd Syahbuddin Hashim =

Malaysian politician

Yang Berhormat Dato' Mohd Syahbuddin Hashim DJMK JMK MLA
- محمّد شهب ٱلدين هاشم

State Leader of the Opposition of Kelantan
- Incumbent
- Assumed office 5 September 2023
- Monarch: Muhammad V
- Menteri Besar: Mohd Nassuruddin Daud
- Preceded by: Md Alwi Che Ahmad
- Constituency: Galas

Member of the Kelantan State Legislative Assembly for Galas
- Incumbent
- Assumed office 9 May 2018
- Preceded by: Abdul Aziz Yusoff (BN–UMNO)
- Majority: 1,738 (2018); 3,337 (2023)

Personal details
- Born: Mohd Syahbuddin bin Hashim; 20 September 1980 (age 45) Kelantan, Malaysia
- Party: United Malays National Organisation (UMNO)
- Other political affiliations: Barisan Nasional (BN)
- Spouse: Syazie Laa
- Education: Sekolah Menengah Sains Sultan Mahmud
- Alma mater: Universiti Teknologi MARA; Universiti Sains Malaysia
- Occupation: Politician

Mohd Syahbuddin bin Hashim (Jawi: محمّد شهب الدين هاشم, Malay pronunciation: [mohamad syahbuddin]; born 20 September 1980) is a Malaysian politician who has served as the State Leader of the Opposition of Kelantan since September 2023 and a Member of Kelantan State Legislative Assembly (MLA) for Galas since May 2018. He is a member and the Deputy Division Chief of Gua Musang of the United Malays National Organisation (UMNO), a component party of Barisan Nasional (BN).

From the 2023 state elections to the 2024 Nenggiri by-election, he was the sole BN and UMNO representative in all four states ruled by Perikatan Nasional (PN), namely Kelantan, Kedah, Perlis and Terengganu. Mohd Azmawi Fikri Abdul Ghani later joined him after he won the by-election. Both of them, together with Kota Lama MLA, Hafidzah Mustakim of the Pakatan Harapan (PH) and National Trust Party (AMANAH), are the only three Kelantan opposition MLAs.

== Election results ==
Kelantan State Legislative Assembly
Year	Constituency	Candidate	Votes	Pct	Opponent(s)	Votes	Pct	Ballots cast	Majority	Turnout
2018	N45 Galas	Mohd Syahbuddin Hashim (UMNO)	7,281	46.09%	Suhaimi Mat Deris (PAS)	5,543	35.09%	16,195	1,738	79.39%
2018	N45 Galas	Mohd Syahbuddin Hashim (UMNO)	7,281	46.09%	Nasir Dollah (DAP)	2,973	18.82%	16,195	1,738	79.39%
2023	N45 Galas	Mohd Syahbuddin Hashim (UMNO)	10,742	59.19%	Mohd Tarmizi Abd Rahman (PAS)	7,405	40.81%	18,314	3,337	61.79%

== Honours ==
- Kelantan :
  - Knight Commander of the Order of the Life of the Crown of Kelantan (DJMK) – Dato' (2025)
  - Companion of the Order of the Life of the Crown of Kelantan (JMK) (2018)
