= 2024 Nenggiri by-election =

2024 by-election in Kelantan, Malaysia

- 17 August 2024

N43 Nenggiri seat in the Kelantan State Legislative Assembly
- Turnout: 73.88% ▲12.79 pp
	First party	Second party
	BN	PAS
Candidate	Mohd Azmawi Fikri Abdul Ghani	Mohd Rizwadi Ismail
Party	UMNO	BERSATU (Using PAS symbol)
Alliance	BN	PN
Popular vote	9,091	5,739
Percentage	61.35%	38.65%
Nenggiri assemblyman before election
Mohd Azizi Abu Naim
Independent (Note: Prior to his sacking, Mohd Azizi was a member of Perikatan Nasional's Malaysian United Indigenous Party (BERSATU).)
Elected Nenggiri assemblyman
Mohd Azmawi Fikri Abdul Ghani
Barisan Nasional (UMNO)

The 2024 Nenggiri by-election was held on 17 August 2024 for the Kelantan State Legislative Assembly seat of Nenggiri. The by-election was called following the disqualification of the incumbent, Mohd Azizi Abu Naim, on 19 June 2024 due to his support for the Anwar Ibrahim government. Mohd Azizi had served as a Member of the Kelantan State Legislative Assembly for Nenggiri since 2023, and also as the Member of Parliament (MP) for Gua Musang.

In this by-election, Barisan Nasional's Mohd Azmawi Fikri Abdul Ghani defeated Perikatan Nasional's Mohd Rizwadi Ismail by a majority of 3,352 votes. This marked the first by-election since the 2022 Malaysian general election where a seat flipped to another party.

== Background ==
Mohd Azizi Abu Naim was first elected to the Kelantan State Legislative Assembly seat of Nenggiri at the 2023 Kelantan state election. Prior to this, he contested and won the federal seat of Gua Musang at the 2022 Malaysian general election, defeating longtime incumbent Tengku Razaleigh Hamzah of Barisan Nasional (BN). He contested under the ticket of Parti Pribumi Bersatu Malaysia (BERSATU), a component party of Perikatan Nasional (PN). On 7 November 2023, Mohd Azizi declared his support for Prime Minister Anwar Ibrahim's government. As a result of violating the party's constitution, BERSATU revoked the memberships of Mohd Azizi and five other politicians who also declared their support for Anwar. PN sought to vacate the seats of these six politicians.

The seat of Nenggiri was declared vacant by the Speaker of the Kelantan State Legislative Assembly, Mohd Amar Abdullah, on 19 June 2024, making it the first seat to be declared vacant following the defections.

== Nomination ==
Mohd Azizi announced that he would not contest in the election, paving the way for others to take over the seat. On 11 July 2024, BN, expected to represent the state opposition and the federal government, confirmed that it would nominate a candidate to contest in the election. On 18 July 2024, BN nominated Kelantan United Malays National Organisation (UMNO) youth chief Mohd Azmawi Fikri Abdul Ghani as its candidate. On 29 July 2024, PN nominated former Gua Musang PAS deputy youth chief Mohd Rizwadi Ismail as its candidate. Rizwadi was previously a member of PAS before joining BERSATU.

On nomination day, it was confirmed that there would be a straight fight between Azmawi of BN and Rizwadi of PN after nominations closed. As in the 2022 Malaysian general election in Kelantan and the 2023 Kelantan state election, PN decided to use PAS' name and logo for its candidate, regardless of the candidate's party affiliation.

== Controversies ==
During a Perikatan Nasional (PN) campaign event, the event's host Zamri Zahari from the Malaysian Islamic Party (PAS) was criticised for using the term "kafir harbi" (belligerent infidels) against the Democratic Action Party (DAP) in his speech. Muslim DAP leaders demanded an apology for the remarks and made a police report regarding the incident. The office of the Mufti of the Federal Territories described the usage of the term as "extreme" against non-Muslims and even many moderate Muslims in the country. In response to the incident, Annuar Musa announced that Zamri would be placed on break for three days but refused to apologise on behalf of PN as he claimed it was Zamri's personal remarks.

In another PN campaign event in Felda Perasu, former Prime Minister Muhyiddin Yassin claimed in a speech that he was not invited by the then 16th Yang di-Pertuan Agong, Al-Sultan Abdullah, to form a government following the 2022 general election despite having the alleged support of 115 MPs. This led the Crown Prince of Pahang, Tengku Hassanal Ibrahim Alam Shah, to call for police action against Muhyiddin for what he described as "deliberately disparaging" his father. On 27 August 2024, Muhyiddin plead not guilty on a charge of insulting the monarchy under the Sedition Act 1948 at the Gua Musang Sessions Court.

== Timeline ==
The key dates are listed below.

Date	Events
28 June 2024	Issue of the Writ of Election
3 August 2024	Nomination Day
3–16 August 2024	Campaigning Period
13–16 August 2024	Early polling day for postal and overseas voters
17 August 2024	Polling Day

== Results ==
Kelantan state by-election, 17 August 2024: Nenggiri Upon the disqualification of incumbent, Mohd Azizi Abu Naim
Party	Candidate	Votes	%	∆%
BN	Mohd Azmawi Fikri Abdul Ghani	9,091	61.35	▲14.61
PAS	Mohd Rizwadi Ismail	5,739	38.65	▼14.61
Total valid votes		14,830	100.00	
Total rejected ballots		135		
Unreturned ballots		3		
Turnout		14,968	73.88	▲12.79
Registered electors		20,259		
Majority		3,352	22.70	▲16.08
BN gain from PAS		Swing		?

BN won 17 out of 20 polling districts, gaining back Renok, Perasu, Limau Kasturi, Kuala Sungai and other 6 polling districts. (BN only won 7 polling districts in the 2023 state election.)

PAS only won at 3 polling districts, Pasir Tumboh, Ladang SEDC and Kesedar Limau Kasturi.

BN won all aboriginal polling districts: Kuala Sungai, Tohoi, Sungai Puian, Sungai Jenera, Simpor and Sungai Wias.

== Previous results ==
Kelantan state election, 2023: Nenggiri
Party	Candidate	Votes	%	∆%
PAS	Mohd Azizi Abu Naim	6,517	53.31	▲8.82
BN	Ab Aziz Yusoff	5,707	46.69	▼1.87
Total valid votes		12,224	100.00	
Total rejected ballots		120		
Unreturned ballots		7		
Turnout		12,351	61.09	▼17.19
Registered electors		20,219		
Majority		810	6.62	▲2.55
PAS gain from BN		Swing		?
