= Gua Musang =

Gua Musang may refer to:

- Gua Musang District
- Gua Musang (federal constituency)
