= 1995 Gua Musang by-election =

- 29 August 1995

P032 Gua Musang seat in the Dewan Rakyat
- Turnout: 77.72%
	First party	Second party
		BN
Candidate	Tengku Razaleigh Hamzah	Hussein Ahmad
Party	Semangat 46	BN
Alliance	Angkatan Perpaduan Ummah	UMNO
Popular vote	13,144	4,746
Percentage	61.02%	38.98%
MP before election
Tengku Razaleigh Hamzah (disqualified)
Angkatan Perpaduan Ummah (Semangat 46)
Elected MP
Tengku Razaleigh Hamzah
Angkatan Perpaduan Ummah (Semangat 46)

The 1995 Gua Musang by-election was a by-election that was held on 29 August 1995 for the Dewan Rakyat seat of Gua Musang. It was called following the void result of 1995 Malaysian general election for the seat by the High Court on 1 August 1995. The petition was filed by Barisan Nasional candidate, Hussein Ahmad whose candidacy for the election was rejected by the returning officer on the nomination day.

Tengku Razaleigh Hamzah, the president of Parti Melayu Semangat 46, won the seat in 1995 Malaysian general election in a straight fight against Nik Ismail Wan Idris of Angkatan Keadilan Insan Malaysia with majority of 8,980.

Tengku Razaleigh defended the seat, defeating Hussein Ahmad of Barisan Nasional with a reduced majority of 4,746 votes. The seat is the largest seat in Kelantan with 28,105 voters with 90 percent Malay voters.

== Results ==
Malaysian general by-election, 29 August 1995: Gua Musang the 8th General Election in April 1995 declared null and void by the High Court.
Party	Candidate	Votes	%	∆%
S46	Tengku Razaleigh Tengku Mohd Hamzah	13,144	61.02	▼12.41
BN	Hussein Ahmad	8,398	38.98	▲38.98
Total valid votes		21,542	100.00	
Total rejected ballots		223		
Unreturned ballots		0		
Turnout		21,765	77.72	▲0.61
Registered electors		28,004		
Majority		4,746	22.04	▼26.62
S46 hold		Swing		
