= Angkatan Amanah Merdeka =

Angkatan Amanah Merdeka (AMANAH)
- اڠکتن امانه مرديکا
- Founded: 2011
- Type: Non-profit; NGO
- Location: Headquarters in Kuala Lumpur
- Fields: Politics
- Key people: Tengku Razaleigh Hamzah (Founder/President)
- Website: Angkatan Amanah Merdeka on Facebook

Angkatan Amanah Merdeka (Malay for "Independence Trust Forces", Abbr.: AMANAH) is a non-government organisation (NGO) founded by Tengku Razaleigh Hamzah on 22 July 2011 at the Memorial Tunku Abdul Rahman in Kuala Lumpur. It is founded to represent the voice of Malaysians and its mission is to fight against corruption, cronyism, racism, extremism and the wastage of government expenditure according to Federal Constitution.

Among the other veteran political leaders who present were the former Minister of Information, Tan Sri Abdul Kadir Sheikh Fadzir; the former President of Parti Kesejahteraan Insan Tanah Air (KITA), Datuk Zaid Ibrahim; former President of MCA, Datuk Seri Ong Tee Keat; former Deputy President of MIC, Datuk S. Subramaniam; Datuk Seri Wilfred Bumburing; Datuk Seri Bujang Ulis; dan Datuk Seri Daniel Tajem. The formation of Amanah has created speculation it is to serve as platform for Tengku Razaleigh Hamzah and its others leaders to maintain their powers and also to enable Tengku to become an alternative choice as the Prime Minister for Pakatan Rakyat in the case that they win the 13th General Election and if Anwar Ibrahim founded guilty and imprisoned for the court case he was facing at that time. As the Amanah is just an NGO, there are some demands for it to change to become a political party and join the opposition in the coming general election.
