= Ulu Kelantan =

Kelantan constituency

Defunct federal constituency
- Legislature: Dewan Rakyat
- Constituency created: 1958
- Constituency abolished: 1986
- First contested: 1959
- Last contested: 1982

Ulu Kelantan was a federal constituency in the Kelantan, Malaysia, that was represented in the Dewan Rakyat from 1959 to 1986.

The federal constituency was created in the 1958 redistribution and was mandated to return a single member to the Dewan Rakyat under the first past the post voting system.

== History ==
It was abolished in 1986 when it was redistributed.

=== Representation history ===
Members of Parliament for Ulu Kelantan
Parliament	No	Years	Member	Party	Vote Share
Constituency created from Kelantan Selatan
Parliament of the Federation of Malaya
1st	P024	1959-1963	Tengku Abdullah Sultan Ibrahim (تڠكو عبدالله سلطان إبراهيم)	Alliance (UMNO)	8,770; 50.50%
Parliament of Malaysia
1st	P024	1963-1964	Tengku Indra Petra Sultan Ibrahim (تڠكو يندرا ڤيترا سلطان إبراهيم)	Alliance (UMNO)	8,770; 50.50%
2nd	P024	1964-1969	Hussein Sulaiman (حسين سليمان)	Alliance (UMNO)	12,681; 57.11%
		1969-1971	Parliament was suspended		
3rd	P024	1971-1973	Nik Ahmad Kamil Nik Mahmud (نئ احمد كاميل نئ مهمود)	Alliance (UMNO)	15,954; 56.35%
3rd	P024	1973-1974	Nik Ahmad Kamil Nik Mahmud (نئ احمد كاميل نئ مهمود)	BN (UMNO)	15,954; 56.35%
4th	P027	1974-1978	Tengku Razaleigh Tengku Mohd Hamzah (تڠكو غزالي حمزة)	BN (UMNO)	Uncontested
5th	P027	1978-1982	Tengku Razaleigh Tengku Mohd Hamzah (تڠكو غزالي حمزة)	BN (UMNO)	10,267; 64.28%
6th	P027	1982-1986	Tengku Razaleigh Tengku Mohd Hamzah (تڠكو غزالي حمزة)	BN (UMNO)	15,573; 61.35%
Constituency abolished, split into Gua Musang, Tanah Merah and Kuala Krai

=== State constituency ===
Parliamentary constituency	State constituency						
Parliamentary constituency	1955–59*	1959–1974	1974–1986	1986–1995	1995–2004	2004–2018	2018–present
Ulu Kelantan			Gua Musang				
Ulu Kelantan			Jeli				
Ulu Kelantan		Machang Selatan					
Ulu Kelantan			Manek Urai				
Ulu Kelantan		Ulu Kelantan Barat					
Ulu Kelantan		Ulu Kelantan Timor					

=== Historical boundaries ===
State Constituency	Area	
State Constituency	1959	1974
Gua Musang		Dabong; Galas; Gua Musang; Nenggiri; Lojing
Jeli		Ayer Lanas; Batu Melintang; Jeli; Kampung Lawar; Sungai Long
Machang Selatan	Banggol Judah; Kampung Baka; Machang; Pangkal Chulit; Ulu Sat	
Manek Urai		FELDA Chiku; Kampung Batu; Manek Urai; Paloh; Pos Lebir
Ulu Kelantan Barat	Dabong; Galas; Gua Musang; Nenggiri; Lojing	
Ulu Kelantan Timor	Chenulang; Kampung Batu; Kuala Krai; Manek Urai; Paloh	

== Election results ==
Malaysian general election, 1982: Ulu Kelantan
Party	Candidate	Votes	%	∆%
BN	Tengku Razaleigh Tengku Mohd Hamzah	15,573	61.35	▼2.93
PAS	Hassan Mat Saman	9,810	38.65	▲2.93
Total valid votes		25,383	100.00	
Total rejected ballots		717		
Unreturned ballots		0		
Turnout		26,100	80.68	
Registered electors		32,350		
Majority		5,763	22.70	▼5.86
BN hold		Swing		

Malaysian general election, 1978: Ulu Kelantan
Party	Candidate	Votes	%	∆%
BN	Tengku Razaleigh Tengku Mohd Hamzah	10,267	64.28	▲64.28
PAS	Khaidir Khatib	5,705	35.72	▲35.72
Total valid votes		15,972	100.00	
Total rejected ballots		120		
Unreturned ballots		0		
Turnout		16,092	76.45	
Registered electors		21,048		
Majority		4,562	28.56	
BN hold		Swing		

Malaysian general election, 1974: Ulu Kelantan
Party	Candidate	Votes	%	∆%
On the nomination day, Tengku Razaleigh Tengku Mohd Hamzah won uncontested.
BN	Tengku Razaleigh Tengku Mohd Hamzah			
Total valid votes			100.00	
Total rejected ballots				
Unreturned ballots				
Turnout				
Registered electors		16,765		
Majority				
BN gain from Alliance		Swing		?

Malaysian general election, 1969: Ulu Kelantan
Party	Candidate	Votes	%	∆%
Alliance	Nik Ahmad Kamil Nik Mahmud	15,954	56.35	▼0.76
PMIP	Khaidir Khatib	12,358	43.65	▲2.63
Total valid votes		28,312	100.00	
Total rejected ballots		1,046		
Unreturned ballots		0		
Turnout		29,358	76.14	▼2.39
Registered electors		38,560		
Majority		3,596	12.70	▼3.39
Alliance hold		Swing		

Malaysian general election, 1964: Ulu Kelantan
Party	Candidate	Votes	%	∆%
Alliance	Hussein Sulaiman	12,681	57.11	▲6.61
PMIP	Wan Yusof Che Tengah	9,108	41.02	▼6.80
Socialist Front	Abdullah Mat Ariff	414	1.86	▲1.86
Total valid votes		22,203	100.00	
Total rejected ballots		947		
Unreturned ballots		0		
Turnout		23,150	78.53	▲2.21
Registered electors		29,479		
Majority		3,573	16.09	▲13.41
Alliance hold		Swing		

Malayan general election, 1959: Ulu Kelantan
Party	Candidate	Votes	%
Alliance	Tengku Indra Petra Sultan Ibrahim	8,770	50.50
PMIP	Amaluddin Darus	8,306	47.82
National Party	Mohamed Yatim Shamsuddin	292	1.68
Total valid votes		17,368	100.00
Total rejected ballots		62	
Unreturned ballots		0	
Turnout		17,430	76.32
Registered electors		22,839	
Majority		464	2.68
This was a new constituency created.
