= CIMB =

Universal bank based in Malaysia

CIMB Group; 聯昌國際銀行
- Formerly: Bumiputra-Commerce Holdings Berhad
- Type: Publicly traded state-owned enterprise
- Traded as: MYX: 1023
- ISIN: MYL1023OO000
- Industry: Financial services
- Founded: 24 December 1956; 69 years ago (Listed in January 2006)
- Founders: Wee Kheng Chiang (as Bian Chiang Bank, established in 1924); Yeap Chor Ee (as Ban Hin Lee Bank, established in 1935)
- Headquarters: Kuala Lumpur, Malaysia
- Area served: Malaysia; Singapore; Indonesia; Thailand; Cambodia; Vietnam; Hong Kong
- Key people: Syed Zaid Albar, Chairman; Novan Amirudin, Chief Executive Officer
- Products: Consumer Banking; Corporate Banking; Investment Banking; Islamic Banking; Asset Management; Insurance & Takaful
- Revenue: ▼RM17.189 billion (Fiscal Year Ended 31 December 2020)
- Operating income: ▲RM8.212 Billion (Fiscal Year Ended 31 December 2020)
- Net income: ▼RM1.194 billion (Fiscal Year Ended 31 December 2020)
- Total assets: ▲RM602.354 billion (Fiscal Year Ended 31 December 2020)
- Total equity: ▼RM55.925 Billion (Fiscal Year Ended 31 December 2020)
- Number of employees: 38,000
- Parent: Khazanah Nasional
- Subsidiaries: CIMB Niaga; Touch 'n Go
- Website: www.cimb.com; www.cimbislamic.com

CIMB Group Holdings Berhad (Chinese: 聯昌國際銀行; MYX: 1023) is a Malaysian universal bank headquartered in Kuala Lumpur and operating in high growth economies in ASEAN. CIMB Group is an indigenous ASEAN investment bank. CIMB has a wide retail branch network with 1,080 branches across the region.

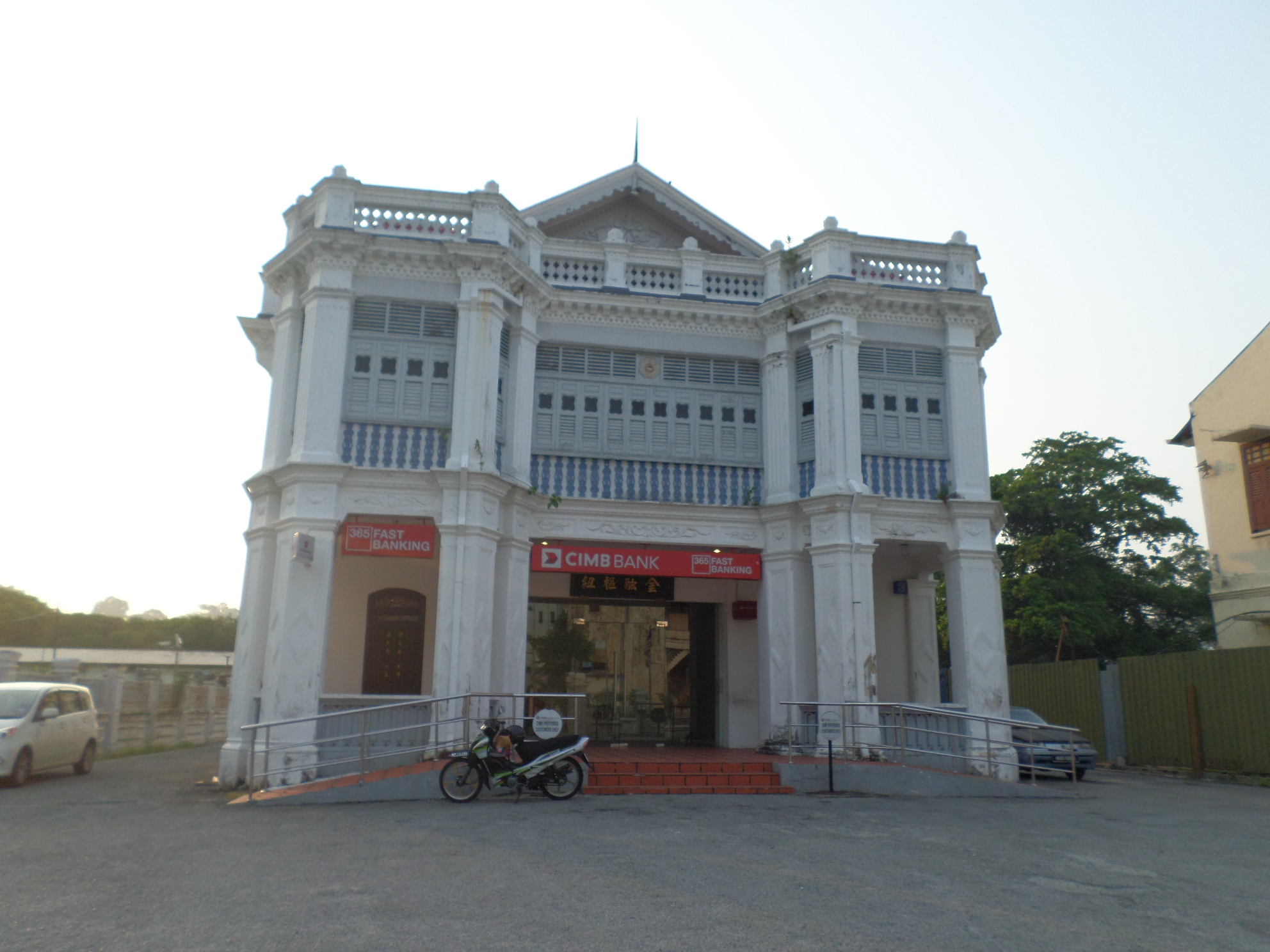
CIMB Bank Jalan Bendahara branch premises, Malacca City, Malacca

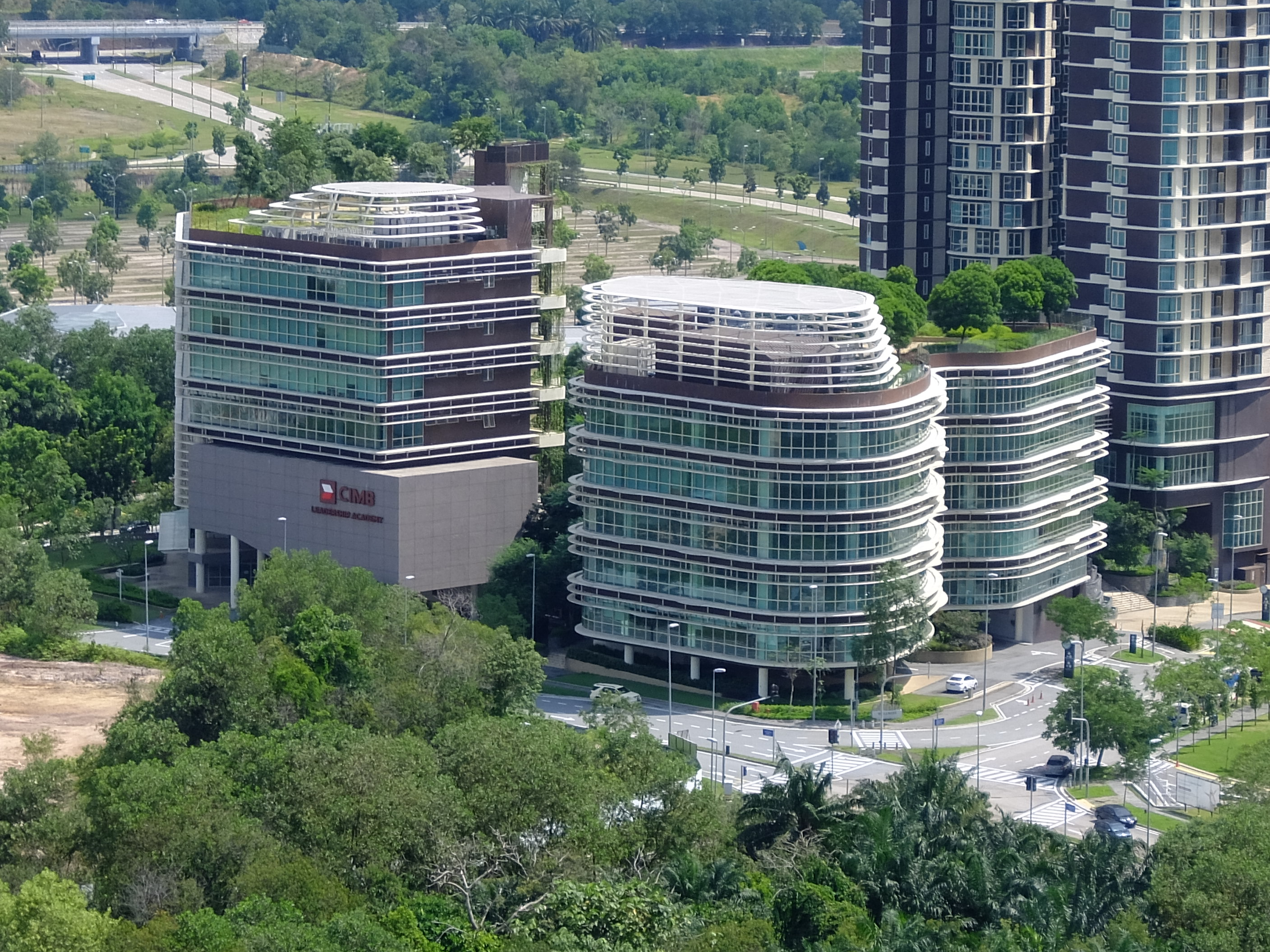
CIMB Bank in Medini, Johor

The group operates under several entities, which include CIMB Investment Bank, CIMB Bank, CIMB Islamic, CIMB Niaga, CIMB Securities International and CIMB Thai. The group's business activities are primarily in the areas of Consumer Banking, Wholesale Banking, comprising Investment Banking and Corporate Banking, Treasury & Markets, and Group Strategy & Strategic Investments, with its core markets being Malaysia, Indonesia, Singapore and Thailand. CIMB Islamic operates in parallel with these businesses, in line with the group's dual banking model.

The group has around 33,000 employees in 18 countries, covering ASEAN and major global financial centres, as well as countries in which its customers have significant business and investment dealings.

The group's geographical reach and its products and services are complemented by partnerships. Its partners include the Principal Financial Group, Bank of Tokyo-Mitsubishi UFJ, Standard Bank and Daewoo Securities, among others.

== Name ==
CIMB is an abbreviation for Commerce International Merchant Bankers.

== History ==
The bank was formed from the merging of various banks that had existed throughout the decades:

- Bian Chiang Bank, established in 1924 in Kuching by Wee Kheng Chiang. Its primary activities were business financing and the issuance of bills of exchange. It was renamed Bank of Commerce Berhad (BCB) following its purchase by the UMNO-owned Fleet group, which was led by Tan Sri Halim Saad (then part-owner of TV3, NSTP and CelcomDigi) in 1979. The bank had RM367 million in total assets and total shareholders' funds of RM12.8 million in 1982.
- Ban Hin Lee Bank (BHLB), established 1935 in Penang by Yeap Chor Ee. Its original focus was serving local businessmen in their trading and merchant activities. In the 1960s it branched out into real estate and home financing and by 1990 it had become a modern financial institution. It was then listed on the Kuala Lumpur Stock Exchange on 7 January 1991.
- Southern Bank Berhad (SBB): founded as Southern Banking Ltd in 1965, starting out in Penang and expanded to Kuala Lumpur. Its products included wealth-management products, credit cards and loans for small and medium enterprises (SME).
- Bank Bumiputra Malaysia Berhad (BBMB), incorporated in 1965. Set up in line with government initiatives to increase Bumiputra participation in the national economy, the bank grew to be one of the largest, with branches throughout the country. By 1980 it had become the largest bank in the country in terms of assets and was the first domestic bank to have operations in New York, London, Tokyo, Bahrain and Hong Kong.
- United Asian Bank Berhad (UAB), established in Kuala Lumpur in 1972. UAB created out of the merger of the Malaysian operations and branches of three Indian-owned banks: Indian Overseas Bank, Indian Bank, and United Commercial Bank. The Government of India had nationalised the largest banks in India, including these three, and Malaysian law prohibited the operation in Malaysia of branches of government-owned foreign banks. UAB's primary purpose was to encourage enterprise among less prosperous sections of the country.
- Pertanian Baring Sanwa Multinational Berhad (PBS); incorporated by Bank Pertanian, Baring Brothers, Multinational Bank of the United Kingdom, and Sanwa Bank of Japan in 1974. It was managed by Baring Brothers and provided corporate advisory and funding services to multinationals. It was renamed Commerce International Merchant Bankers Berhad (CIMB) in 1986 as a result of BCB replacing Bank Pertanian as the controlling shareholder of PBS. Corporate finance remained CIMB's main focus and stock broking was added to its range of services.

Bank of Commerce acquired UAB in 1991, in which consequently increased Bank of Commerce's branch network almost fourfold. The listed holding company was then renamed Commerce-Asset Holdings Berhad (CAHB). BBMB merged with CAHB to form the Bumiputra-Commerce Bank in 1999. SBB acquired Ban Hin Lee Bank Berhad and two smaller finance companies, Perdana Finance Berhad and Cempaka Finance Berhad in 2000 as part of a government initiated banking consolidation plan.

CIMB was listed on the main board of the Kuala Lumpur Stock Exchange in 2003. In the same year, CIMB Islamic was launched providing customers with Syariah compliant solutions. A year later, it acquired 70% of Commerce Trust Berhad (CTB) and Commerce Asset Fund Managers Berhad (CAFM), leading to the formation of CIMB-Principal, a joint venture with the Principal Group of the United States. Then in 2005, CIMB acquired Singapore based G.K. Goh, which was established in 1979 as an international stock broker. This led to the formation of CIMB-GK, CIMB's international investment banking operations.

In 2005, CAHB announced a decision to create a universal bank by combining its commercial and investment banks. Following this announcement, Bumiputra-Commerce Group was acquired by CIMB. As part of the exercise, CAHB was renamed Bumiputra-Commerce Holdings and it completed its restructuring exercise in January 2006. The new CIMB Group was known as a universal bank. It made a transition to a full-service banking provider serving corporates to individuals. Then in March, CIMB Group acquired SBB after extensive negotiations. After the acquisition, on 7 September 2006, CIMB Group was launched by the then Prime Minister of Malaysia, Dato' Seri Abdullah Ahmad Badawi.

In 2007, CIMB Group launched its presence in both Thailand and USA through the establishment of CIMB-GK Securities (Thailand) Ltd. and CIMB-GK Securities (USA) Inc. In November, CIMB Foundation launched as a not-for-profit organisation that will carry out the group's corporate social responsibility.

2008: CIMB Group entered into an agreement for a 19.99% stake in Bank of Yingkou adding mainland China to the Group's network. In the same year CIMB Group undertook the merger of PT Bank Niaga TBK with PT Bank Lippo Tbk to create the sixth-largest bank in Indonesia. CIMB Group and the Principal Financial Group launched CIMB-Principal Islamic Asset Management also in that year. Lastly, CIMB Group entered into an agreement with Financial Institutions Development Fund to purchase a 42.13% stake in Bank Thai Public Company.

In 2009, CIMB Bank and CIMB Islamic moved to a new headquarters, the 39-storey Menara Bumiputra-Commerce which houses CIMB Group's consumer banking franchises. The building site was the location of the bank's predecessors, Bank Bumiputra and the United Asian Bank. In the same year, CIMB Thai was officially launched with its new brand and logo unveiled to the public in May 2009 by Khun Korn Chatikavanji, Thailand's Minister of Finance. In September, CIMB Group set up retail banking services in Singapore through CIMB Bank Singapore.

CIMB Group expanded to Cambodia through the fully owned subsidiary CIMB Bank Plc in 2010. The first branch, which also serves as the headquarters, was officially launched in Phnom Penh on 19 November 2010. In 2012, CIMB Group purchased the Asian investment banking business of Royal Bank of Scotland, including the RBS franchise in Australia for GBP173.9 million (MYR849.4 million). CIMB claimed to become the largest investment banking franchise based in Asia Pacific (ex-Japan). CIMB ranked at 10 for the world's largest Islamic banks in 2020, moving up two spots from the previous year.

== Businesses ==
=== Consumer banking ===
CIMB Group has full-fledged consumer banking services across its main operating markets in Malaysia, Indonesia, Singapore, Thailand, Cambodia, and Philippines. The divisions which comprise Consumer Banking are:

- Consumer Sales and Distribution which oversees the sales network including branches and mobile sales teams
- Retail Financial Services which is responsible for most of the retail banking as well as enterprise banking products
- Commercial Banking which is responsible for SME and mid-size companies
- Group Cards and Personal Financing which is responsible for credit cards businesses and personal loans portfolio

=== Wholesale banking ===
The wholesale banking business comprises two divisions: Investment Banking and Corporate Banking, Treasury & Markets.

Investment Banking comprises Corporate Client Solutions, which covers the bank's institutional and corporate clients and Sector Specialists in real estate and agribusiness; the Advisory business unit which consists of Corporate Finance and Project Advisory; the Group Equities business unit comprising Equity Capital Markets (ECM), Institutional Sales, Research, Retail Equities, Futures Broking and Securities Services; and the Group Asset Management business unit which is the bank's retail and institutional fund management arm.

Corporate Banking, Treasury and Markets is responsible for corporate banking; transaction banking; the group's markets, sales and trading businesses in interest rates, credit, foreign exchange, commodities, equities and their derivatives; debt capital markets; fixed income investments; and treasury and funding operations for the group.

=== Group Strategy and Strategic Investments ===
Group Strategy and Strategic Investments consists of Group Strategy, Private Equity and Strategic Investments. The division is responsible for undertaking the bank's initiatives in important regional markets.

=== Islamic banking ===
CIMB Islamic is CIMB Group's global Islamic banking and finance franchise. It offers the full complement of Shariah-compliant financial solutions, operating in parallel with the group's universal banking franchise.

== CIMB Group's Brands ==
- CIMB Group represents its universal banking franchise.
- CIMB represents its investment banking services, asset management and private banking franchise.
- CIMB Bank represents its consumer bank and corporate banking franchise in Malaysia, Singapore, Cambodia and Philippines.
- CIMB Niaga represents its consumer and corporate banking franchise in Indonesia.
- CIMB Thai represents its consumer and corporate banking franchise in Thailand.
- CIMB Islamic is its Islamic banking franchise, incorporating products and services in compliance with Shariah principles.

== Corporate profile ==
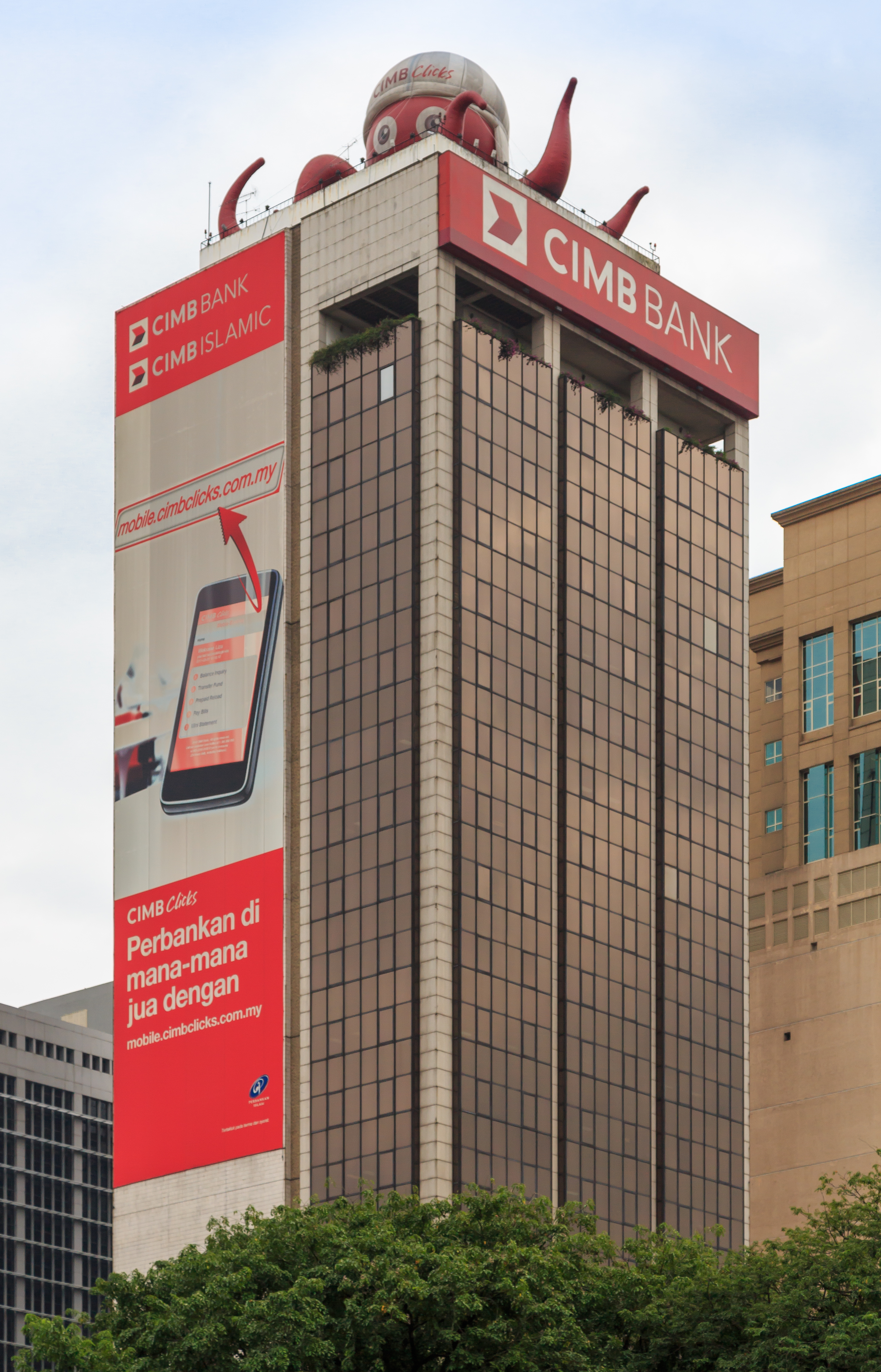
Former group headquarters in Kuala Lumpur

=== CIMB Group Holdings Berhad ===
CIMB Group Holdings Berhad has been listed on the Main Market of Bursa Malaysia since 1987 with a market capitalisation of RM38.7 billion. Total assets at the end of 2015 were RM461.6 billion, with total shareholders' funds of RM41.1 billion and total Islamic assets of RM70.7 billion.

=== CIMB Group ===
The group is a regional universal bank with ASEAN as its core market. The group is headquartered in Kuala Lumpur, Malaysia. It has 1,080 branches across eight out of the 10 ASEAN nations. Its wholesale division encompasses its indigenous investment bank in ASEAN plus corporate banking, treasury and markets, and group strategy and strategic investments. Products and services are complemented with partnerships with various companies including the Principal Financial Group, Bank of Tokyo-Mitsubishi UFJ, Daewoo Securities, Sun Life Assurance, Allianz Insurance, Thai Life Insurance, Sri Ayudhya General Insurance, Kotak Mahindra Group, Mapletree Investments, and TrustCapital Advisors. Outside ASEAN, CIMB Group has representation in China (mainland and Hong Kong), the United States, Bahrain, the United Kingdom, India and Sri Lanka.

=== CIMB Bank ===
The group has full-fledged consumer banking services across its four main operating markets of Malaysia, Indonesia, Singapore and Thailand, plus a growing presence in Cambodia and the Philippines.

CIMB Bank's Authorized Agent Banks (AAB's) directly cover Malaysia and Singapore. BDO Universal Bank Inc. directly covers the Philippines and is an (AAB) Authorized Agent Bank for International Treaty Tax Collection. Malaysia is the largest market for CIMB Bank and there were 294 branches, 7.8 million customers, 2,199 ATMs, and over 20,000 staff at the end of 2011.

The all-digital CIMB Bank Philippines was established in December 2018 and officially launched in 2019, using a mobile app called OCTO as a platform through which users can open accounts and manage transactions.

CIMB Bank in Singapore had two branches, 277,000 customers, six ATMs and over 1,300 staff at the end of 2011. CIMB Bank in Cambodia had seven branches, 3,100 customers, 10 ATMs and over 90 staff at the end of 2011.

=== CIMB Investment Bank ===
CIMB Investment Bank is the investment banking arm of CIMB Group with offices in Malaysia, Singapore, Indonesia, China (Hong Kong and Shanghai), Thailand, Australia, Korea, India, the United Kingdom, the United States, Sri Lanka, and Myanmar. The investment banking products and services offered by CIMB Investment Bank cover corporate advisory, corporate finance, equity markets, debt markets, research, private equity, real estate investment management, fund management, wealth management and private banking services. CIMB has remittance tie ups with BDO Universal Bank in the Philippines for secure cross border money transfers.

=== CIMB Islamic ===
CIMB Islamic is the global Islamic banking and finance arm of CIMB Group. It offers Shariah-compliant financial solutions in investment banking, consumer banking, asset management, takaful, private banking and wealth management. CIMB Islamic products and operations are managed in strict compliance with Shariah principles under the guidance of the CIMB Islamic Shariah Committee.

=== CIMB Niaga ===
CIMB Niaga logo

Established in 1955 as Bank Niaga, CIMB Niaga is the group's consumer banking arm in Indonesia and as at end 2011, it was the fifth largest bank in terms of assets and the third largest mortgage provider.

It has been listed on the Indonesia Stock Exchange since 1989 and had a market capitalisation of about Rp30,660.6 billion at the end of 2011 with shareholders' funds of Rp18.3 trillion and total assets of Rp166.8 trillion. CIMB Niaga offers a comprehensive range of conventional and Shariah compliant products and services. At the end of 2011, it had 901 branches, 4.2 million customers, 1,749 ATMs, and nearly 14,000 staff. CIMB Group Holdings Berhad had a 97.93% stake in CIMB Niaga, including 1.02% of PT Commerce Kapital, at the end of 2011.

=== CIMB Thai ===
Established 1949 as The Union Bank of Bangkok and later changed name as BankThai (since 1998), CIMB Thai is the group's consumer banking arm in Thailand. It was the 10th largest listed commercial bank in Thailand in terms of assets and the seventh largest in terms of market capitalisation at the end of 2011. It had a market capitalisation of about THB47.0 billion at the end of 2011, with shareholders' funds of THB13.32 billion and total assets of THB168.02 billion. CIMB Thai offers a range of financial products and services to customers, both corporate and retail. At the end of 2011, CIMB Thai had 157 branches, 2.2 million customers, 533 ATMs and over 4,000 staff. CIMB Group Holdings Berhad has a 93.15% stake in CIMB Thai since 2009.

=== CIMB Vietnam ===
CIMB Bank was founded in Vietnam in 2009. The bank's total assets grew from VND3.203 trillion in 2016 to VND41.382 trillion in 2022. In 2021, CIMB Bank Vietnam was awarded three top digital bank awards in Vietnam, including: Fastest Growing Digital Bank Vietnam 2021 by Global Banking & Finance Review, Most Innovative Digital Bank Vietnam 2021 by International Finance, and Best Digital Bank of Vietnam 2021 by RBI Asia Trailblazers.

== Works cited ==
- TOPIX New Index Series (As of 30 October 2009), Tokyo Stock Exchange.
