= Bumiputra-Commerce Holdings =

Malaysian company

Bumiputra Commerce Bank (BCB)
- Company type: Public
- Industry: Financial services
- Predecessor: Bank Bumiputera Malaysia Berhad and Commerce-Asset Holdings Berhad
- Founded: 2001-Present
- Successor: CIMB Group
- Headquarters: Kuala Lumpur, Malaysia
- Key people: Tan Sri Dato' Md Nor Yusof, Chairman; Dato' Sri Nazir Razak, Group Chief Executive
- Products: Consumer Banking; Corporate Banking; Investment Banking; Islamic banking Asset management Insurance
- Revenue: RM7.74 billion (2008)
- Net income: RM1.95 billion (2008)
- Total assets: RM206.7 billion (2008)
- Total equity: RM11.2 billion (2008)
- Number of employees: 36,209 (2001)
- Website: CIMB Group website

Bumiputra Commerce Bank (BCB) (formerly known as Commerce Asset-Holdings Berhad) is the listed vehicle for CIMB Group, Malaysia's second-largest financial services group. The new name will also ensure consistency between the listed entity and its operating subsidiaries, and serves to further strengthen the CIMB brand value proposition. It has been listed on the Main Board of Bursa Malaysia, the nation's stock exchange since 2001. As at February, (BCB) Bumiputra Commerce Bank was the sixth-largest company on Bursa Malaysia with a market capitalization of RM21.7 billion.

Bumiputra Commerce Bank (BCB) has gone through an internal restructuring process, which has resulted in transforming the company. Previously its operating entities in various financial services sectors operated largely on a standalone basis. However, from late 2004 onwards, it began to consolidate all its operations under CIMB Group, to form a universal bank anchored by BCB Holdings, South East Asia's largest investment bank.

CIMB Group is Malaysia's second-largest financial services provider and one of Southeast Asia's leading universal banking groups. It offers consumer banking, investment banking, Islamic banking, asset management and insurance products and services. Headquartered in Kuala Lumpur, its regional offices are located in Singapore, Indonesia and Thailand. It operates its business through three main brand entities, CIMB Bank, CIMB Investment Bank and CIMB Islamic. CIMB Group is also the majority shareholder of PT CIMB Bank Niaga Tbk in Indonesia. BCHB has more than 36,000 staff in its offices in eleven countries.
