= Mohd Azmawi Fikri Abdul Ghani =

UMNO politician

Yang Berhormat Tuan Mohd Azmawi Fikri Abdul Ghani MLA
- محمّد عسماوي فكري عبدالغني

Member of the Kelantan State Legislative Assembly for Nenggiri
- Incumbent
- Assumed office 17 August 2024
- Preceded by: Mohd Azizi Abu Naim (PN–BERSATU)
- Majority: 3,352 (2024)

Kelantan Youth Chief of the United Malays National Organisation
- Incumbent
- Assumed office 31 March 2023
- President: Ahmad Zahid Hamidi
- National Youth Chief: Muhamad Akmal Saleh
- Vice Youth Chief: Mohd Sharizal Semsuddin
- Preceded by: Noor Hariri Mohamed Noor

Personal details
- Born: Mohd Azmawi Fikri bin Abdul Ghani Gua Musang, Kelantan, Malaysia
- Party: United Malays National Organisation (UMNO)
- Other political affiliations: Barisan Nasional (BN)
- Spouse: Noor Khamilaa Mohd Zain (m. 2010)
- Children: 3
- Education: Gua Musang Primary School; Tengku Indra Putra 1 Secondary School
- Alma mater: Universiti Utara Malaysia (BBA)
- Occupation: Politician

Mohd Azmawi Fikri bin Abdul Ghani (Jawi: محمّد عسماوي فكري بن عبدالغني), also known as Awie, is a Malaysian politician who currently serves as Member of the Kelantan State Legislative Assembly for Nenggiri. He is a member, State Youth Chief of Kelantan and the Youth Division Chief of Gua Musang of the United Malays National Organisation (UMNO), a component party of Barisan Nasional (BN). He is one of the only two federal government state assembly representatives in the four states that are controlled totally by PN (Perlis, Kedah, Kelantan, Terengganu).

== Early life and education ==
Mohd Azmawi Fikri bin Abdul Ghani was born in Gua Musang, Kelantan, Malaysia. He received his early education in Gua Musang Primary School and Tengku Indra Putra 1 Secondary School. After completing Form 6, he continued his studies in Universiti Utara Malaysia, where he received his Bachelor of Business Administration in 2019.

== Business career ==
Mohd Azmawi Fikri has been serving as manager for Kaz Tech Enterprise since 2006, managing director of AF Eighty Six Squad Sdn Bhd since 2020, board member of FELCRA from 2022 until 2023, and board member for Lembaga Kemajuan Kelantan Selatan (KESEDAR) and FELCRA Processing & Engineering since 2023.

== Political career ==
Mohd Azmawi Fikri has been served as Communication Chief of UMNO Youth of Kelantan (2018–2023) and Vice Chief of UMNO Youth of Kelantan (2022–2023). Now, he currently serves as Youth Chief for Gua Musang division since 2018 and Youth Chief of UMNO Youth of Kelantan since 2023.

== Personal life ==
Mohd Azmawi Fikri is married to Noor Khamilaa Mohd Zain on 2010 and have 3 children.

== Election results ==
Kelantan State Legislative Assembly
Year	Constituency	Candidate	Votes	Pct	Opponent(s)	Votes	Pct	Ballots cast	Majority	Turnout
2024	N43 Nenggiri	Mohd Azmawi Fikri Abdul Ghani (UMNO)	9,091	61.35%	Mohd Rizwadi Ismail (BERSATU)	5,739	38.65%	14,830	3,352	73.88%
