= Galas (state constituency) =

State constituency in Kelantan, Malaysia

Galas (N45)
Kelantan constituency

State constituency
- Legislature: Kelantan State Legislative Assembly
MLA
Mohd Syahbuddin Hashim
BN
- Constituency created: 1984
- First contested: 1986
- Last contested: 2023

Demographics
- Population (2020): 50,230
- Electors (2023): 29,638

Galas is a state constituency in Kelantan, Malaysia, that has been represented in the Kelantan State Legislative Assembly.

The state constituency was first contested in 1986 and is mandated to return a single Assemblyman to the Kelantan State Legislative Assembly under the first-past-the-post voting system.

== Demographics ==
Ethnic breakdown of Galas's electorate as of 2023
1. Malay (59.5%)
2. Other ethnicities (25.9%)
3. Chinese (13.6%)
4. Indian (1.05%)

== History ==
=== Polling districts ===
According to the gazette issued on 30 March 2018, the Galas constituency has a total of 15 polling districts.

State Constituency	Polling Districts	Code	Location
Galas (N45)	Sungai Betis	032/45/01	SK Kuala Betis
Galas (N45)	Lojing	032/45/02	SK Pos Brooke
Galas (N45)	Sungai Ber	032/45/03	SK Hendrop
Galas (N45)	Belatim	032/45/04	Balai Rawatan JAKOA Pos Belatim
Galas (N45)	Balar	032/45/05	SK Balar
Galas (N45)	Bihai	032/45/06	SK Bihai
Galas (N45)	Hau	032/45/07	Tabika Hau
Galas (N45)	Kampung Pulai	032/45/08	SJK (C) Kampung Pulai
Galas (N45)	Kampung Bahru	032/45/09	SJK (C) Gua Musang
Galas (N45)	Bandar Lama Gua Musang	032/45/10	SK Gua Musang
Galas (N45)	Bandar Baru Gua Musang	032/45/11	SMK Tengku Idera Petra (1)
Galas (N45)	Kampung Batu Papan	032/45/12	SK Sri Wangi 2
Galas (N45)	Lepan Tupai	032/45/13	SK Lepan Jaya
Galas (N45)	Sungai Terah	032/45/14	SK Tengku Muhammad Fakhry Petra
Galas (N45)	Blau	032/45/15	SK Blau

=== Representation history ===
Members of the Legislative Assembly for Galas
Assembly	No	Years	Member	Party
Constituency created from Gua Musang
7th	N39	1986–1990	Zakaria Hasan	BN (UMNO)
8th	N39	1990–1995	Omar Mohamed	S46
9th	N43	1995–1999	Omar Mohamed	S46
10th	N43	1999–2004	Mohamad Saufi Deraman	BN (UMNO)
11th	N45	2004–2008	Mohamad Saufi Deraman	BN (UMNO)
12th	N45	2008–2010	Che Hashim Sulaiman	PR (PAS)
12th	N45	2010–2013	Ab Aziz Yusoff	BN (UMNO)
13th	N45	2013–2018	Ab Aziz Yusoff	BN (UMNO)
14th	N45	2018–2023	Mohd Syahbuddin Hashim	BN (UMNO)
15th	N45	2023–present	Mohd Syahbuddin Hashim	BN (UMNO)

== Election results ==
Kelantan state election, 2023
Party	Candidate	Votes	%	∆%
BN	Mohd Syahbuddin Hashim	10,742	59.19	▲13.10
PAS	Mohd Tarmizi Abd Rahman	7,405	40.81	▲5.72
Total valid votes		18,147	100.00	
Total rejected ballots		27		
Unreturned ballots		140		
Turnout		18,314	61.79	▼17.60
Registered electors		29,638		
Majority		3,337	18.38	▲7.38
BN hold		Swing		

Kelantan state election, 2018
Party	Candidate	Votes	%	∆%
BN	Mohd Syahbuddin Hashim	7,281	46.09	▼9.07
PAS	Suhaimi Mat Deris	5,543	35.09	▼9.75
PKR	Nasir Dollah	2,973	18.82	▲18.82
Total valid votes		15,797	100.00	
Total rejected ballots		317		
Unreturned ballots		81		
Turnout		16,195	79.39	▼6.91
Registered electors		20,399		
Majority		1,738	11.00	▲0.68
BN hold		Swing		

Kelantan state election, 2013
Party	Candidate	Votes	%	∆%
BN	Abdul Aziz Yusoff	6,956	55.16	▼1.13
PAS	Abdullah Hussein	5,655	44.84	▲1.13
Total valid votes		12,611	100.00	
Total rejected ballots		273		
Unreturned ballots		24		
Turnout		12,908	86.30	▲3.27
Registered electors		14,962		
Majority		1,301	10.32	▼2.26
BN hold		Swing		

Kelantan state by-election, 4 November 2010 The by-election was called due to the death of incumbent, Che Hashim Sulaiman.
Party	Candidate	Votes	%	∆%
BN	Abdul Aziz Yusoff	5,324	56.29	▲10.25
PAS	Zulkefli Mohamed	4,134	43.71	▼10.25
Total valid votes		9,458	100.00	
Total rejected ballots		132		
Unreturned ballots		3		
Turnout		9,593	83.03	▲2.14
Registered electors		11,553		
Majority		1,190	12.58	▲4.66
BN gain from PAS		Swing		?
Source(s) "Pilihan Raya Kecil N.45 Galas". Election Commission of Malaysia.

Kelantan state election, 2008
Party	Candidate	Votes	%	∆%
PAS	Che Hashim Sulaiman	4,399	53.96	▲16.98
BN	Omar Mohamed	3,753	46.04	▼16.98
Total valid votes		8,152	100.00	
Total rejected ballots		171		
Unreturned ballots		33		
Turnout		8,356	80.89	▲5.04
Registered electors		10,330		
Majority		646	7.92	▼18.12
PAS gain from BN		Swing		?

Kelantan state election, 2004
Party	Candidate	Votes	%	∆%
BN	Mohamad Saufi Deraman	4,184	63.02	▼0.44
PAS	Che Hashim Sulaiman	2,455	36.98	▲36.98
Total valid votes		6,639	100.00	
Total rejected ballots		156		
Unreturned ballots		10		
Turnout		6,805	75.85	▲3.85
Registered electors		8,972		
Majority		1,729	26.04	▼0.88
BN hold		Swing		

Kelantan state election, 1999
Party	Candidate	Votes	%	∆%
BN	Mohamad Saufi Deraman	5,336	63.46	▲20.85
PKR	Zulkifli Mohamad	3,072	36.54	▲36.54
Total valid votes		8,408	100.00	
Total rejected ballots		297		
Unreturned ballots		0		
Turnout		8,705	72.00	▲1.19
Registered electors		12,091		
Majority		2,264	26.92	▲14.90
BN gain from S46		Swing		?

Kelantan state election, 1995
Party	Candidate	Votes	%	∆%
S46	Omar Mohamed	4,056	54.63	▼17.10
BN	Abdullah Sulaiman	3,163	42.61	▲14.34
KITA	Nik Ismail Wan Idris	205	2.76	▲2.76
Total valid votes		7,424	100.00	
Total rejected ballots		472		
Unreturned ballots		57		
Turnout		7,953	70.81	▼2.72
Registered electors		11,231		
Majority		893	12.02	▼31.44
S46 hold		Swing		

Kelantan state election, 1990
Party	Candidate	Votes	%	∆%
S46	Omar Mohamed	4,465	71.73	▲71.73
BN	Zakaria Hasan	1,760	28.27	▼44.48
Total valid votes		6,225	100.00	
Total rejected ballots		199		
Unreturned ballots		0		
Turnout		6,424	73.53	▲3.55
Registered electors		8,737		
Majority		2,705	43.46	▼2.04
S46 gain from BN		Swing		?

Kelantan state election, 1986
Party	Candidate	Votes	%
BN	Zakaria Hasan	3,420	72.75
PAS	Ibrahim Renjar	1,281	27.25
Total valid votes		4,701	100.00
Total rejected ballots		225	
Unreturned ballots		0	
Turnout		4,926	69.98
Registered electors		7,039	
Majority		2,139	45.50
This was a new constituency created.
