= Mohd Azizi Abu Naim =

Malaysian politician

Yang Berhormat Tuan Mohd Azizi Abu Naim MP
- محمّد عزيزي أبو نعيم

Member of the Malaysian Parliament for Gua Musang
- Incumbent
- Assumed office 19 November 2022
- Preceded by: Tengku Razaleigh Hamzah (BN–UMNO)
- Majority: 163 (2022)

Member of the Kelantan State Legislative Assembly for Nenggiri
- In office 12 August 2023 – 19 June 2024
- Preceded by: Ab Aziz Yusoff (BN–UMNO)
- Succeeded by: Mohd Azmawi Fikri Abdul Ghani (BN–UMNO)
- Majority: 810 (2023)

Personal details
- Born: Mohd Azizi bin Abu Naim Malaysia
- Citizenship: Malaysian
- Party: Malaysian United Indigenous Party (BERSATU) (until 2024); Independent (since 2024)
- Other political affiliations: Perikatan Nasional (PN) (until 2024)

Mohd Azizi bin Abu Naim is a Malaysian politician who has served as the Member of Parliament (MP) for Gua Musang since November 2022. He served as Member of the Kelantan State Legislative Assembly (MLA) for Nenggiri from August 2023 to his disqualification in June 2024. He was a member and Division Chief of Gua Musang of the Malaysian United Indigenous Party, a component party of Perikatan Nasional coalition. He is the shortest-serving Nenggiri MLA in history, in office for only slightly over 10 months. Currently, he is an independent politician since his BERSATU membership ended on 12 June 2024.

On 7 November 2023, Mohd Azizi declared support for Prime Minister Anwar Ibrahim's government, making him the third opposition member to support the government. On 19 June 2024, Speaker of the Kelantan State Legislative Assembly Mohd Amar Abdullah declared the vacancy of the Nenggiri state seat held and represented by Mohd Azizi after his BERSATU membership ended.

== Election results ==
Parliament of Malaysia
| Year | Constituency | Candidate | Votes | Pct | Opponent(s) | Votes | Pct | Ballots cast | Majority | Turnout |
|---|---|---|---|---|---|---|---|---|---|---|
| 2022 | P032 Gua Musang | Mohd Azizi Abu Naim (BERSATU) | 21,826 | 45.12% | Tengku Razaleigh Hamzah (UMNO) | 21,663 | 44.78% | 48,377 | 163 | 68.86% |
| 2022 | P032 Gua Musang | Mohd Azizi Abu Naim (BERSATU) | 21,826 | 45.12% | Asharun Aji (PKR) | 4,517 | 9.34% | 48,377 | 163 | 68.86% |
| 2022 | P032 Gua Musang | Mohd Azizi Abu Naim (BERSATU) | 21,826 | 45.12% | Samsu Adabi Mamat (PEJUANG) | 371 | 0.77% | 48,377 | 163 | 68.86% |

Kelantan State Legislative Assembly
| Year | Constituency | Candidate | Votes | Pct | Opponent(s) | Votes | Pct | Ballots cast | Majority | Turnout |
|---|---|---|---|---|---|---|---|---|---|---|
| 2023 | N43 Nenggiri | Mohd Azizi Abu Naim (BERSATU) | 6,517 | 53.31% | Ab Aziz Yusoff (UMNO) | 5,707 | 46.69% | 12,224 | 810 | 60.46% |

== Honours ==
=== Honours of Malaysia ===
- Malaysia
  - Recipient of the 17th Yang di-Pertuan Agong Installation Medal (2024)
