= Nenggiri =

State constituency in Kelantan, Malaysia

Nenggiri (N43)
Kelantan constituency

State constituency
- Legislature: Kelantan State Legislative Assembly
MLA
Mohd Azmawi Fikri Abdul Ghani
BN
- Constituency created: 2003
- First contested: 2004
- Last contested: 2024

Demographics
- Population (2020): 32,240
- Electors (2024): 20,259

Nenggiri is a state constituency in Kelantan, Malaysia, that has been represented in the Kelantan State Legislative Assembly.

The state constituency was first contested in 2004 and is mandated to return a single Assemblyman to the Kelantan State Legislative Assembly under the first-past-the-post voting system.

== Demographics ==
Ethnic breakdown of Nenggiri's electorate as of 2023
1. Malay (85.9%)
2. Other ethnicities (13.8%)
3. Chinese (0.20%)
4. Indian (0.03%)

== History ==
=== Polling districts ===
According to the Gazette issued on 30 March 2018, the Nenggiri constituency has a total of 20 polling districts.

| State Constituency | Polling Districts | Code | Location |
|---|---|---|---|
| Nenggiri (N43) | Tohoi | 032/43/01 | SK Tohoi |
| Nenggiri (N43) | Pos Simpor | 032/43/02 | Dewan Orang Ramai Pos Simpor |
| Nenggiri (N43) | Sungai Puian | 032/43/03 | Pusat Pendidikan Komuniti Pos Gob |
| Nenggiri (N43) | Sungai Jenera | 032/43/04 | SK Sri Permai (JHEOA) |
| Nenggiri (N43) | Sungai Wias | 032/43/05 | SK Pulat |
| Nenggiri (N43) | Jerek | 032/43/06 | SK Jerek |
| Nenggiri (N43) | Bertam Baru | 032/43/07 | SK Bertam |
| Nenggiri (N43) | Pasir Tumboh | 032/43/08 | SK Pasir Tumboh |
| Nenggiri (N43) | Ladang SEDC | 032/43/09 | SK Sungai Terah |
| Nenggiri (N43) | Jeram Tekoh | 032/43/10 | SK Jeram Tekoh |
| Nenggiri (N43) | Sungai Asap | 032/43/11 | SMK Sungai Asap |
| Nenggiri (N43) | Renok | 032/43/12 | SK Renok Baru |
| Nenggiri (N43) | Kuala Sungai | 032/43/13 | SK Kuala Sungai |
| Nenggiri (N43) | Bertam Lama | 032/43/14 | TABIKA Sri Bakawali |
| Nenggiri (N43) | Star | 032/43/15 | SK Star |
| Nenggiri (N43) | Perasu | 032/43/16 | SK Perasu |
| Nenggiri (N43) | Serian | 032/43/17 | Balai Raya Kampung Batu 12 Serian |
| Nenggiri (N43) | Meranto | 032/43/18 | SK Meranto |
| Nenggiri (N43) | KESEDAR Limau Kasturi | 032/43/19 | SK Limau Kasturi (2) |
| Nenggiri (N43) | Limau Kasturi | 032/43/20 | SK Limau Kasturi (1) |

=== Representation history ===
Members of the Legislative Assembly for Nenggiri
| Assembly | No | Years | Member | Party |
Constituency split from Dabong
| 11th | N43 | 2004–2008 | Mat Yusoff Abdul Ghani | BN (UMNO) |
| 12th | N43 | 2008–2013 | Mat Yusoff Abdul Ghani | BN (UMNO) |
| 13th | N43 | 2013–2018 | Mat Yusoff Abdul Ghani | BN (UMNO) |
| 13th | N43 | 2018 | Vacant (Note: Seat vacated until the 2018 Malaysian general election due to the incumbent had been declared bankrupt. No by-election was held as the next general election was coming to its close.) | |
| 14th | N43 | 2018–2023 | Ab Aziz Yusoff | BN (UMNO) |
| 15th | N43 | 2023–2024 | Mohd Azizi Abu Naim | PN (BERSATU) |
| 15th | N43 | 2024 | Mohd Azizi Abu Naim | Independent |
| 15th | N43 | 2024–present | Mohd Azmawi Fikri Abdul Ghani | BN (UMNO) |

== Election results ==
Kelantan state by-election, 17 August 2024: Nenggiri Upon the disqualification of incumbent, Mohd Azizi Abu Naim
| Party | Candidate | Votes | % | ∆% |
|---|---|---|---|---|
| BN | Mohd Azmawi Fikri Abdul Ghani | 9,091 | 61.35 | ▲14.61 |
| PAS | Mohd Rizwadi Ismail | 5,739 | 38.65 | ▼14.61 |
| Total valid votes | | 14,830 | 100.00 | |
| Total rejected ballots | | 135 | | |
| Unreturned ballots | | 3 | | |
| Turnout | | 14,968 | 73.88 | ▲12.79 |
| Registered electors | | 20,259 | | |
| Majority | | 3,352 | 22.70 | ▲16.08 |
| BN gain from PAS | | Swing | | ? |

Kelantan state election, 2023: Nenggiri
| Party | Candidate | Votes | % | ∆% |
|---|---|---|---|---|
| PAS | Mohd Azizi Abu Naim | 6,517 | 53.31 | ▲8.82 |
| BN | Ab Aziz Yusoff | 5,707 | 46.69 | ▼1.87 |
| Total valid votes | | 12,224 | 100.00 | |
| Total rejected ballots | | 120 | | |
| Unreturned ballots | | 7 | | |
| Turnout | | 12,351 | 61.09 | ▼17.19 |
| Registered electors | | 20,219 | | |
| Majority | | 810 | 6.62 | ▲2.55 |
| PAS gain from BN | | Swing | | ? |

Kelantan state election, 2018: Nenggiri
| Party | Candidate | Votes | % | ∆% |
|---|---|---|---|---|
| BN | Ab Aziz Yusoff | 5,506 | 48.56 | ▼19.15 |
| PAS | Mohd Sidek @ Mohd Saupi Abd Razak | 5,045 | 44.49 | ▲44.49 |
| PKR | Othman Yusoff | 788 | 6.95 | ▼21.59 |
| Total valid votes | | 11,339 | 100.00 | |
| Total rejected ballots | | 290 | | |
| Unreturned ballots | | 121 | | |
| Turnout | | 11,750 | 78.28 | ▼9.42 |
| Registered electors | | 15,010 | | |
| Majority | | 461 | 4.07 | ▼35.10 |
| BN hold | | Swing | | |

Kelantan state election, 2013: Nenggiri
| Party | Candidate | Votes | % | ∆% |
|---|---|---|---|---|
| BN | Mat Yusoff Abd Ghani | 6,654 | 67.71 | ▲2.77 |
| PKR | Mohammad Azihan Che Seman | 2,805 | 28.54 | ▼6.52 |
| Independent | Abdul Aziz Mohamed | 368 | 3.75 | ▲3.75 |
| Total valid votes | | 9,827 | 100.00 | |
| Total rejected ballots | | 306 | | |
| Unreturned ballots | | 20 | | |
| Turnout | | 10,153 | 87.70 | ▲3.92 |
| Registered electors | | 11,572 | | |
| Majority | | 3,849 | 39.17 | ▲9.29 |
| BN hold | | Swing | | |

Kelantan state election, 2008: Nenggiri
| Party | Candidate | Votes | % | ∆% |
|---|---|---|---|---|
| BN | Mat Yusoff Abd Ghani | 4,543 | 64.94 | ▼6.21 |
| PKR | Mohd Zuki Ibrahim | 2,453 | 35.06 | ▲6.21 |
| Total valid votes | | 6,996 | 100.00 | |
| Total rejected ballots | | 204 | | |
| Unreturned ballots | | 14 | | |
| Turnout | | 7,214 | 83.78 | ▲2.68 |
| Registered electors | | 8,611 | | |
| Majority | | 2,090 | 29.88 | ▼12.42 |
| BN hold | | Swing | | |

Kelantan state election, 2004: Nenggiri
| Party | Candidate | Votes | % |
|---|---|---|---|
| BN | Mat Yusoff Abd Ghani | 4,516 | 71.15 |
| PKR | Mohd Zain Muhammad | 1,831 | 28.85 |
| Total valid votes | | 6,347 | 100.00 |
| Total rejected ballots | | 193 | |
| Unreturned ballots | | 7 | |
| Turnout | | 6,547 | 81.10 |
| Registered electors | | 8,073 | |
| Majority | | 2,685 | 42.30 |
This was a new constituency created.
