= Bank Bumiputera Malaysia =

Malaysian Bank

- Founded: 1965; 61 years ago

Bank Bumiputra Malaysia Berhad was a Malaysian bank, established in 1965. It was merged into Bumiputra-Commerce Holdings in 1999.

== The Inception ==
On 4 June 1965, "Kongres Ekonomi Bumiputra" (Bumiputra Economic Congress), sponsored by the Ministry of National and Rural Development, were held in Kuala Lumpur for 3 days to generate an interest among Malays and other local indigenous groups to participate in commerce and industry. Seven working committees were formed to achieve these objectives.

Tun Abdul Razak, the then Deputy Prime Minister of Malaysia announced that the Government had agreed to form a local Bank ("Bank Bumiputra") as recommended by the Economic Congress based on a majority of the 69 resolutions achieved in the meeting. The Bank, with its initial capital to be provided by the Malaysian Government, would be established. The Bank's ownership would ultimately be sold to the public through shares. On 15 July 1965, Tun Abdul Razak announced the Government agreed to provide RM5 million as the initial capital for Bank Bumiputra.

Bank Bumiputra Malaysia Berhad was formally launched by Tun Abdul Razak on 1 October 1965 with authorised capital of RM25 million, instead of RM5 million announced earlier. The senior management was headed by Mohd Raslan bin Dato' Abdullah (Managing Director), former Accountant General of Government and Tengku Razaleigh (Executive Director). The other board members are S.O.K. Ubaidulla (President of United Chamber of Commerce), L.E Osman (a lawyer), K. Mushir Ariff (an incorporated valuer), Wan Yahya bin Haji Mohamad (a businessman from Terengganu), K.D. Eu (a company director, and Kuok Hock Nien (a company director). The General Manager of the Bank was Wong Aun Pui, a prominence local banker with 20 years of experience and director of many rubber and palm oil companies.

Bank Bumiputra moved to its own building in 1978, costing RM 20 million.
