= Gua Musang (federal constituency) =

Federal constituency of Kelantan, Malaysia

Gua Musang (P032)
Kelantan constituency
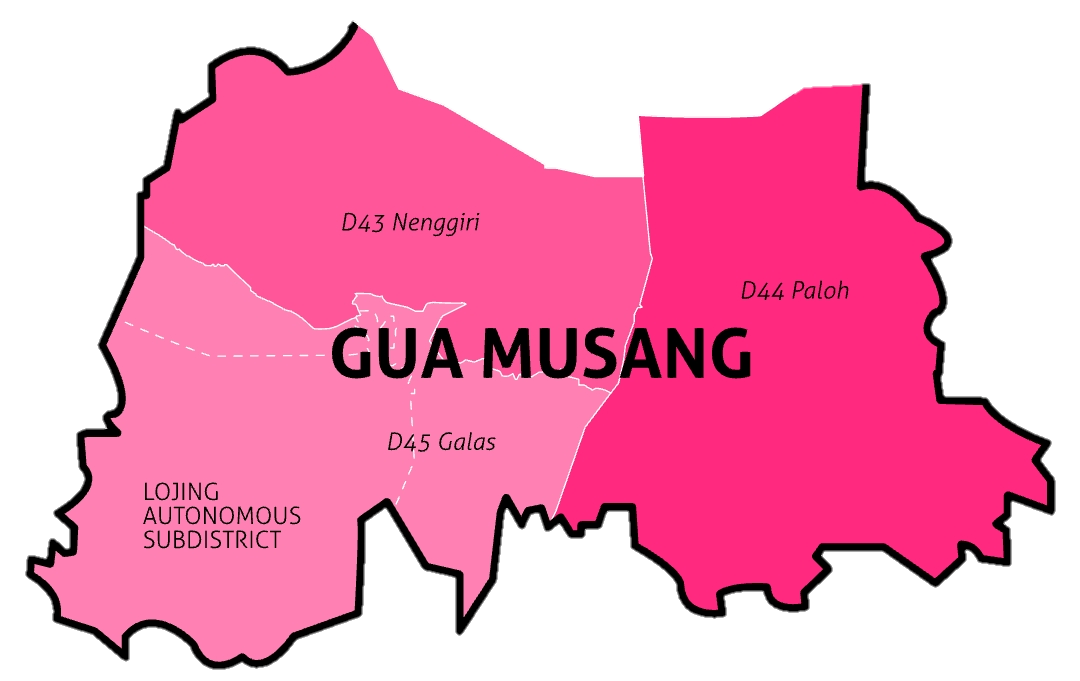

Federal constituency
- Legislature: Dewan Rakyat
- MP: Mohd Azizi Abu Naim; Independent
- Constituency created: 1984
- First contested: 1986
- Last contested: 2022

Demographics
- Population (2020): 112,495
- Electors (2023): 71,019
- Area (km²): 8,174
- Pop. density (per km²): 13.8

Gua Musang is a federal constituency in Gua Musang District, Kelantan, Malaysia, that has been represented in the Dewan Rakyat since 1986.

The federal constituency was created in the 1984 redistribution and is mandated to return a single member to the Dewan Rakyat under the first past the post voting system.

This seat was the safe seat held by Tengku Razaleigh Hamzah since the seat's inception in 1986, until he narrowly lost in the 2022 election to Mohd Azizi Abu Naim, representing PAS, with just a margin of 163 votes.

At 8,174 km^{2}, it is the largest parliamentary constituency in Peninsular Malaysia.

== Demographics ==
Ethnic breakdown of Gua Musang's electorate as of 2022
1. Malay (82.3%)
2. Other ethnicities (8.30%)
3. Chinese (5.80%)
4. Indian (3.60%)

As of 2020, Gua Musang has a population of 112,495 people.

Age breakdown of Gua Musang's electorate as of 2022
1. 18-20 (8.25%)
2. 21-29 (27.0%)
3. 30-39 (26.9%)
4. 40-49 (15.2%)
5. 50-59 (9.89%)
6. 60-69 (8.31%)
7. 70-79 (3.56%)
8. 80-89 (0.65%)
9. above 90 (0.13%)
Gender breakdown of Gua Musang's electorate as of 2022
1. Male (50.9%)
2. Female (49.1%)

== History ==
=== Polling districts ===
According to the federal gazette issued on 18 July 2023, the Gua Musang constituency is divided into 46 polling districts.

State constituency	Polling district	Code	Location
Nenggiri (N43)	Tohoi	032/43/01	SK Tohoi
Nenggiri (N43)	Pos Simpor	032/43/02	Dewan Orang Ramai Pos Simpor
Nenggiri (N43)	Sungai Puian	032/43/03	Pusat Pendidikan Komuniti Pos Gob
Nenggiri (N43)	Sungai Jenera	032/43/04	SK Sri Permai (JHEOA)
Nenggiri (N43)	Sungai Wias	032/43/05	SK Pulat
Nenggiri (N43)	Jerek	032/43/06	SK Jerek
Nenggiri (N43)	Bertam Baru	032/43/07	SK Bertam
Nenggiri (N43)	Pasir Tumboh	032/43/08	SK Pasir Tumboh
Nenggiri (N43)	Ladang SEDC	032/43/09	SK Sungai Terah
Nenggiri (N43)	Jeram Tekoh	032/43/10	SK Jeram Tekoh
Nenggiri (N43)	Sungai Asap	032/43/11	SMK Sungai Asap
Nenggiri (N43)	Renok	032/43/12	SK Renok Baru
Nenggiri (N43)	Kuala Sungai	032/43/13	SK Kuala Sungai
Nenggiri (N43)	Bertam Lama	032/43/14	Tabika Sri Bakawali
Nenggiri (N43)	Star	032/43/15	SK Star
Nenggiri (N43)	Perasu	032/43/16	SK Perasu
Nenggiri (N43)	Serian	032/43/17	Balai Raya Kampung Batu 12 Serian
Nenggiri (N43)	Meranto	032/43/18	SK Meranto
Nenggiri (N43)	KESEDAR Limau Kasturi	032/43/19	SK Limau Kasturi (2)
Nenggiri (N43)	Limau Kasturi	032/43/20	SK Limau Kasturi (1)
Paloh (N44)	FELDA Sungai Chiku 3	032/44/01	SMK Bandar Chiku
Paloh (N44)	Pasir Linggi	032/44/02	SK Pasir Linggi
Paloh (N44)	KESEDAR Paloh	032/44/03	SMK Paloh
Paloh (N44)	KESEDAR Sungai Chalil	032/44/04	SK Chalil
Paloh (N44)	Lebir	032/44/05	SK Lebir
Paloh (N44)	KESEDAR Paloh 3	032/44/06	SK Paloh 3
Paloh (N44)	Aring	032/44/07	SK Aring
Paloh (N44)	FELDA Sungai Chiku 1	032/44/08	SMK Chiku 2
Paloh (N44)	FELDA Sungai Chiku 7	032/44/09	SK Chiku 7
Paloh (N44)	FELDA Sungai Chiku 2	032/44/10	SK Sri Chiku 2
Paloh (N44)	KESEDAR Paloh 2	032/44/11	SK Paloh 1; SK Paloh 2
Galas (N45)	Sungai Betis	032/45/01	SK Kuala Betis
Galas (N45)	Lojing	032/45/02	SK Pos Brooke
Galas (N45)	Sungai Ber	032/45/03	SK Hendrop
Galas (N45)	Belatim	032/45/04	Balai Rawatan JAKOA Pos Belatim
Galas (N45)	Balar	032/45/05	SK Balar
Galas (N45)	Bihai	032/45/06	SK Bihai
Galas (N45)	Hau	032/45/07	Tabika Hau
Galas (N45)	Kampung Pulai	032/45/08	SJK (C) Kampung Pulai
Galas (N45)	Kampung Bahru	032/45/09	SJK (C) Gua Musang
Galas (N45)	Bandar Lama Gua Musang	032/45/10	SK Gua Musang
Galas (N45)	Bandar Baru Gua Musang	032/45/11	SMK Tengku Idera Petra (1)
Galas (N45)	Kampung Batu Papan	032/45/12	SK Sri Wangi 2
Galas (N45)	Lepan Tupai	032/45/13	SK Lepan Jaya
Galas (N45)	Sungai Terah	032/45/14	SK Tengku Muhammad Fakhry Petra
Galas (N45)	Blau	032/45/15	SK Blau

=== Representation history ===
Members of Parliament for Gua Musang
Parliament	No	Years	Member	Party	Vote Share
Constituency created, renamed from Ulu Kelantan
7th	P029	1986–1990	Tengku Razaleigh Tengku Mohd Hamzah (تڠكو غزالي تڠكو محمّد حمزة)	BN (UMNO)	12,538; 70.61%
8th	P029	1990–1995	Tengku Razaleigh Tengku Mohd Hamzah (تڠكو غزالي تڠكو محمّد حمزة)	APU (S46)	18,973; 76.82%
9th	P032	1995–1999	Tengku Razaleigh Tengku Mohd Hamzah (تڠكو غزالي تڠكو محمّد حمزة)	APU (S46)	13,716; 74.33% 13,144 (by-election); 61.02%
10th	P032	1999–2004	Tengku Razaleigh Tengku Mohd Hamzah (تڠكو غزالي تڠكو محمّد حمزة)	BN (UMNO)	12,825; 56.44%
11th	P032	2004–2008	Tengku Razaleigh Tengku Mohd Hamzah (تڠكو غزالي تڠكو محمّد حمزة)	BN (UMNO)	13,570; 66.06%
12th	P032	2008–2013	Tengku Razaleigh Tengku Mohd Hamzah (تڠكو غزالي تڠكو محمّد حمزة)	BN (UMNO)	14,043; 59.26%
13th	P032	2013–2018	Tengku Razaleigh Tengku Mohd Hamzah (تڠكو غزالي تڠكو محمّد حمزة)	BN (UMNO)	21,367; 62.26%
14th	P032	2018–2022	Tengku Razaleigh Tengku Mohd Hamzah (تڠكو غزالي تڠكو محمّد حمزة)	BN (UMNO)	19,426; 48.64%
15th	P032	2022–2024	Mohd Azizi Abu Naim (محمّد عزيزي أبو نعيم)	PN (BERSATU)	21,826; 45.12%
15th	P032	2024–present	Mohd Azizi Abu Naim (محمّد عزيزي أبو نعيم)	Independent	21,826; 45.12%

=== State constituency ===
Parliamentary constituency	State constituency						
Parliamentary constituency	1955–1959*	1959–1974	1974–1986	1986–1995	1995–2004	2004–2018	2018–present
Gua Musang				Dabong			
Gua Musang				Galas			
Gua Musang						Nenggiri	
Gua Musang				Paloh			

=== Historical boundaries ===
State Constituency	Area			
State Constituency	1984	1994	2003	2018
Dabong	Dabong; Jelawang; Kemubu; Kuala Balah; Sri Bintang	Dabong; Jelawang; Jerek Baru; Kemubu; Kuala Gris		
Galas	Gua Musang; Jeram Tekoh; Kuala Betis; Lojing; Sungai Asap		Gua Musang; Kampung Tanah Puteh; Lojing; Pos Bihai; Pos Brooke	Gua Musang; Kampung Tanah Puteh; Lojing; Kuala Betis; Pos Brooke
Nenggiri			Bertam Lama; Jeram Tekoh; Kuala Betis; Pos Gob; Sungai Asap	Bertam Lama; Jeram Tekoh; Limau Kasturi; Pos Gob; Sungai Asap
Paloh	FELDA Sungai Chiku; KESEDAR Paloh; KESEDAR Sungai Chalil; Limau Kasturi; Pos Lebir			FELDA Sungai Chiku; KESEDAR Paloh; KESEDAR Sungai Chalil; Pos Aring; Pos Lebir

=== Current state assembly members ===
No.	State Constituency	Member	Coalition (Party)
N43	Nenggiri	Mohd Azmawi Fikri Abdul Ghani	BN (UMNO)
N44	Paloh	Shaari Mat Hussain	PN (BERSATU)
N45	Galas	Mohd Syahbuddin Hashim	BN (UMNO)

=== Local governments & postcodes ===
No.	State Constituency	Local Government	Postcode
N43	Nenggiri	Gua Musang District Council	18300 Gua Musang
N44	Paloh	Gua Musang District Council	18300 Gua Musang
N45	Galas	Gua Musang District Council	18300 Gua Musang

== Election results ==
Malaysian general election, 2022
Party	Candidate	Votes	%	∆%
PAS	Mohd Azizi Abu Naim	21,826	45.12	▲6.28
BN	Tengku Razaleigh Tengku Mohd Hamzah	21,663	44.78	▼3.82
PH	Asharun Uji	4,517	9.34	▲9.34
PEJUANG	Samsu Abdabi Mamat	371	0.77	▲0.77
Total valid votes		48,377	100.00	
Total rejected ballots		743		
Unreturned ballots		549		
Turnout		49,699	68.86	▼9.59
Registered electors		70,254		
Majority		163	0.34	▼19.46
PAS gain from BN		Swing		?
Source(s) https://lom.agc.gov.my/ilims/upload/portal/akta/outputp/1753266/PUB%20607%20(2022).pdf

Malaysian general election, 2018
Party	Candidate	Votes	%	∆%
BN	Tengku Razaleigh Tengku Mohd Hamzah	19,426	48.64	▼13.62
PAS	Abdullah Hussein	15,513	38.84	▲1.10
PKR	Mohd. Nor Hussin	4,997	12.51	▲12.51
Total valid votes		39,936	100.00	
Total rejected ballots		948		
Unreturned ballots		322		
Turnout		41,206	78.45	▼8.91
Registered electors		52,524		
Majority		3,913	19.80	▼4.72
BN hold		Swing		
Source(s) "His Majesty's Government Gazette - Notice of Contested Election, Parliament for the State of Kelantan [P.U. (B) 234/2018]" (PDF). Attorney General's Chambers of Malaysia. 3 May 2018. "Federal Government Gazette - Results of Contested Election and Statements of the Poll after the Official Addition of Votes, Parliamentary Constituencies for the State of Kelantan [P.U. (B) 308/2018]" (PDF). Attorney General's Chambers of Malaysia. 28 May 2018.

Malaysian general election, 2013
Party	Candidate	Votes	%	∆%
BN	Tengku Razaleigh Tengku Mohd Hamzah	21,367	62.26	▲3.00
PAS	Wan Abdul Rahim Wan Abdullah	12,954	37.74	▼3.00
Total valid votes		34,321	100.00	
Total rejected ballots		712		
Unreturned ballots		64		
Turnout		35,097	87.36	▲3.59
Registered electors		40,176		
Majority		8,413	24.52	▲6.00
BN hold		Swing		
Source(s) "Federal Government Gazette - Notice of Contested Election, Parliament for the State of Kelantan [P.U. (B) 171/2013]" (PDF). Attorney General's Chambers of Malaysia. 26 April 2013. "Federal Government Gazette - Results of Contested Election and Statements of the Poll after the Official Addition of Votes, Parliamentary Constituencies for the State of Kelantan [P.U. (B) 212/2013]" (PDF). Attorney General's Chambers of Malaysia. 22 May 2013. Archived from the original (PDF) on 2019-12-29.

Malaysian general election, 2008
Party	Candidate	Votes	%	∆%
BN	Tengku Razaleigh Tengku Mohd Hamzah	14,063	59.26	▼6.80
PAS	Zulkefli Mohamed	9,669	40.74	▲6.80
Total valid votes		23,732	100.00	
Total rejected ballots		489		
Unreturned ballots		62		
Turnout		24,283	83.77	▲3.13
Registered electors		28,986		
Majority		4,394	18.52	▼13.60
BN hold		Swing		

Malaysian general election, 2004
Party	Candidate	Votes	%	∆%
BN	Tengku Razaleigh Tengku Mohd Hamzah	13,570	66.06	▲9.62
PAS	Zulkefli Mohamed	6,972	33.94	▼9.62
Total valid votes		20,542	100.00	
Total rejected ballots		534		
Unreturned ballots		0		
Turnout		21,076	80.64	▲3.11
Registered electors		26,135		
Majority		6,598	32.12	▲19.24
BN hold		Swing		

Malaysian general election, 1999
Party	Candidate	Votes	%	∆%
BN	Tengku Razaleigh Tengku Mohd Hamzah	12,825	56.44	▲17.46
PAS	Razak Abas	9,900	43.56	▲43.56
Total valid votes		22,725	100.00	
Total rejected ballots		451		
Unreturned ballots		0		
Turnout		23,176	77.53	▼0.19
Registered electors		29,892		
Majority		2,925	12.88	▼9.16
BN gain from S46		Swing		?

Malaysian general by-election, 29 August 1995 the 8th General Election in April 1995 declared null and void by the High Court.
Party	Candidate	Votes	%	∆%
S46	Tengku Razaleigh Tengku Mohd Hamzah	13,144	61.02	▼12.41
BN	Hussein Ahmad	8,398	38.98	▲38.98
Total valid votes		21,542	100.00	
Total rejected ballots		223		
Unreturned ballots		0		
Turnout		21,765	77.72	▲0.61
Registered electors		28,004		
Majority		4,746	22.04	▼26.62
S46 hold		Swing		

Malaysian general election, 1995
Party	Candidate	Votes	%	∆%
S46	Tengku Razaleigh Tengku Mohd Hamzah	13,716	74.33	▼2.49
KITA	Nik Ismail Wan Idris	4,736	25.67	▲25.67
Total valid votes		18,452	100.00	
Total rejected ballots		3,152		
Unreturned ballots		67		
Turnout		21,671	77.11	▼3.92
Registered electors		28,104		
Majority		8,980	48.66	▼4.98
S46 hold		Swing		

Malaysian general election, 1990
Party	Candidate	Votes	%	∆%
S46	Tengku Razaleigh Tengku Mohd Hamzah	18,973	76.82	▲76.82
BN	Wan Ismail Ibrahim	5,724	23.18	▼47.43
Total valid votes		24,697	100.00	
Total rejected ballots		475		
Unreturned ballots		0		
Turnout		25,172	81.03	▲4.92
Registered electors		31,064		
Majority		13,249	53.64	▲12.42
S46 gain from BN		Swing		?

Malaysian general election, 1986
Party	Candidate	Votes	%
BN	Tengku Razaleigh Tengku Mohd Hamzah	12,538	70.61
PAS	Wan Abdul Rahim Wan Abdullah	5,219	29.39
Total valid votes		17,757	100.00
Total rejected ballots		493	
Unreturned ballots		0	
Turnout		18,250	76.11
Registered electors		23,977	
Majority		7,319	41.22
This was a new constituency created.
