= List of Coronet Films films =

This is an alphabetical list of major titles produced by Coronet Films, an educational film company from the 1940s through 1990s (when it merged with Phoenix Learning Group, Inc.). The majority of these films were initially available in the 16mm film format. The company started offering VHS videocassette versions in 1979 in addition to films, before making the transition to strictly videos around 1986.

A select number of independently produced films that Coronet merely distributed, including many TV and British productions acquired for 16mm release within the United States, are included here. One example is a popular series, "World Cultures & Youth", which was produced in Canada, but with some backing by Coronet. Also included are those Centron Corporation titles released when Coronet owned them, although their back catalogue of films made earlier were reissued under the Coronet banner.

It was quite common for a film to be re-released as a "2nd edition" with only minor changes in the edit and a different soundtrack, with music and narration styles changed to fit the changing times. This was true in the 1970s, when classrooms demanded more stimulating cinematic lectures. Quite often, only the newest edition of a film is available today. Those titles involving more serious edit changes or actual re-filming are listed as separate titles. In most cases, additional information is provided in the "year / copyright date" column.

== # ==
Title	Major credits (mostly advisers prior to '70s)	Black & white or color (& running time)	Year / copyright date	Notes
The 1780's		c-26m	1986	Video

== A ==
Title	Major credits (mostly advisers prior to '70s)	Black & white or color (& running time)	Year / copyright date	Notes
A for Alphabet	(William Peterson Associates)	c-11m	1971	
Abraham Lincoln: A Background Study (The Boyhood of Abraham Lincoln)	David A. Smart (producer); Elmer Louis Kayser	c-17m	August 7, 1951	Video
Accounting Procedures	Hamden L. Forkner	c-11m	July 2, 1962	Video
Acids, Bases and Salts	Dale A. Dreisbach	c-22m	June 10, 1959	Video
Acids, Bases and Salts		c-20m	1983	Chemistry; Video
Act Your Age	David A. Smart (producer)	bw-13m	December 22, 1949	Video
Acting with Maturity	Richard Hill Byrne	c-10m	May 6, 1969	Second Edition of "Act Your Age" Video
Adaptations of Birds	W.J. Beecher	c-11m	June 12, 1972	Video
Adaptations of Plants		c-14m	1989	Video
Adaptations of Plants and Animals	Glenn O. Blough	c-13m	June 4, 1957	Video
Addition for Beginners	David Rappaport	c-12m	April 1, 1966	
Addition Is Easy	David A. Smart (producer); F. Lynwood Wren	bw-10m	December 17, 1948	
Adjusting Your Reading Speeds	Theodore L. Harris	c-14m	June 13, 1968	Reading Growth
Administration of Thomas Jefferson	Merrill D. Peterson	c-14m	February 25, 1973	
The Advance of Science: Space	(Gamma Films); Ron Tyner	c-16m	June 30, 1978	
The Advance of Science: Underseas	(Gamma Films); Ron Tyner	c-16m	1978	Video
Advanced Tumbling	David A. Smart (producer); Karl W. Bookwalter & Otto Ryser	c-10m	December 14, 1945	
Adventures of Two Little Goats		bw-11m	March 26, 1956	Background for Reading & Expression
The Aegean Age	Helene J. Kantor	c-14m	March 4, 1965	
African Continent: An Introduction	Hibberd V. B. Kline Jr.	c-17m	October 11, 1962	
African Continent: Northern Region	Hibberd V. B. Kline Jr.	c-14m	October 19, 1962	
African Continent: Southern Region	Hibberd V. B. Kline Jr.	c-11m	October 1, 1962	Video
African Continent: Tropical Region	Hibberd V. B. Kline Jr.	c-13m	October 30, 1962	Video
The Age of Absolute Monarchs in Europe	George T. Romani	c-13m	March 9, 1965	Video
Age of Discovery: English, French and Dutch Explorations	George I. Sanchez	c-11m	January 31, 1956, revised 2nd edition 1979	
Age of Discovery: Spanish and Portuguese Discovery	George I. Sanchez	c-11m	January 31, 1956, revised 2nd edition 1979	Video (1956 version)
The Age of Enlightenment in Europe	George T. Romani	bw-13m	March 25, 1965	
Agency Disclosure: Who Do You Represent?		c-17m	1986	
Air All About Us	Henry J. Otto	bw-11m	June 30, 1954	Exploring Science
Air in Action	David A. Smart (producer); Ira M. Freeman	bw-11m	April 2, 1947	
Airplanes: Principles of Flight	J. Darrell Barnard	c-11m	March 23, 1960	Video
Alaska, a Modern Frontier	David A. Smart (producer); F. Lynwood Wren	c-11m	August 3, 1948	Video
Alcohol and Tobacco: What They Do to Our Bodies		bw-10m	November 16, 1953	
Alcohol: Choices for Handling It	Albert D. Ullman & Robert Wolfarth	c-13m	July 9, 1976	Video
Alexander Has a Good Day		bw-12m	July 1, 1969	
Alexander the Great and the Hellenistic Age	Chester G. Starr	c-16m	October 1, 1964	
Alexander Learns Good Health		c-11m	December 6, 1955	
Algae and Fungi	Raymond Elwood Girton	c-14m	November 1, 1957	
Algebra in Everyday Life (A Way of Thinking About Numbers)	David A. Smart (producer); R. Orin Cornett	bw-11m	December 27, 1948, 1965	Video
Algebra: Relations, Functions and Variation	H. Vernon Price	c-11m	October 1, 1964	
Allergy? Aller-Choo!		c-14m	1982	Healthwise
Almos' a Man	Robert Geller (producer); Stan Latham	c-39m	1977	
An Alphabet of Animals		c-12m	May 29, 1974	Video
Alphabet of Animals	Joel Marks (producer); Mel Waskin	c-13m	1989	
An Alphabet of Birds		c-12m	December 1, 1966	
Alphabet of Birds (2nd edition)		c-14m	1988	
An Alphabet of Dinosaurs	(Christianson Productions); Joel Marks (producer); David Christianson	c-13m	1994	Animated cartoon
An Alphabet of Insects	Joel Marks (producer)	c-12m	1986	
An Alphabet of Weather		c-10m	1991	
Am I Dependable?		c-11m	October 1, 1970	
Am I Trustworthy?	David A. Smart (producer); Ted Peshak; consultant: Elizabeth B. Carey	bw-11m	June 28, 1950	Video
Amazing Ants		c-11m	1980	
Ambush	(BBC); Mel Waskin; adviser: Fred R. Wilkin	c-11m	1988	Eye On Nature
America At War		c-10 parts (25m each)	1990	
America: My Country	Harold D. Drummond	c-11m	April 1, 1971	Video
America's Heroes: Abraham Lincoln	O. O. Winther	c-11m	January 5, 1970	
America's Heroes: George Washington	O. O. Winther	c-11m	January 5, 1970	
America's Story: Abraham Lincoln (Abe Lincoln)	(Schoolhouse Pictures)	c-28m	1987	Part animation
America's Story: George Washington	(Schoolhouse Pictures)	c-26m	1987	Part animation
American Bald Eagle		c-16m	January 7, 1971	Video
American Buffalo: The Comeback Trail	(Moreland-Latchford Productions)	c-10m	1974	
American Indians Before European Settlement	David A. Baerreis	c-11m	June 18, 1959	Video
American Literature: Colonial Times	Robert C. Pooley	c-11m	December 23, 1953, revised 2nd version 1975	Video
American Literature: Early National Period	Robert C. Pooley	c-11m	December 23, 1953	Video
American Literature: The Realists	Robert C. Pooley	c-11m	December 23, 1953	
American Literature: Revolutionary Times	Robert C. Pooley	c-11m	December 23, 1953	
American Literature: The Westward Movement	Robert C. Pooley	c-11m	1957	Video
American Revolution: The Background Period	Allen W. Moger	c-11m	June 22, 1954, revised 2nd version 1975	Video
American Revolution: The Postwar Period	Allen W. Moger	c-11m	June 22, 1954, revised 2nd version 1975	Video
American Revolution: The War Years	Allen W. Moger	c-11m	June 22, 1954, revised 2nd version 1975	Video
The American Short Story	(Perspective Films); Robert Geller	c-24m	1977	
American Square Dance	David A. Smart (producer); V. F. Hernlund & Henry W. Graef	bw-11m	July 7, 1947	Video
American Tall Tale Heroes	Alfred Bulltop Stormalong	c-16m	August 12, 1974	Video
The Americans with Disabilities Act: New Access to the Workplace	Joel Marks (producer); Cathy Hurwitz	c-40m	1991	
Amphibians	Hanor A. Webb	bw-11m	January 3, 1957	
Amy the Photographer: U.S.A.	(Sunrise Films of Toronto); Fred Harris	c-24m	1978	World Cultures & Youth (Canada: Spread Your Wings); also known as Through Amy's Eyes
Anatomy of a Teenage Courtship	(Nett-Link Productions);	c-28m	January 8, 1970	Video
Anatomy of a Teenage Engagement		c-28m	January 5, 1970	Video
Anatomy of a Teenage Marriage	(CineImage Productions)	c-28m	June 15, 1972	
Ancient Civilizations		c-series of 8mm film loops (4-6m each)	May 21, 1974	
Ancient Egypt	David A. Smart (producer); Richard A. Parker	bw-11m	September 30, 1952	
Ancient Egypt	Anita M. Walker & Elizabeth W. Ransom	c-11m	1977	Video
Ancient Greece	David A. Smart (producer); Elmer Louis Kayser	c-11m	February 20, 1952, revised 1976	Video
Ancient Mesopotamia	John Smart (producer); Richard A. Parker	c-11m	March 26, 1953	
Ancient Mesopotamia (2nd edition)	Anita M. Walker & Elizabeth W. Ransom	c-11m	July 22, 1977 (edited '76)	Video
The Ancient Orient: The Far East	Merrill R. Goodall	c-13m	July 12, 1957	
Ancient Paestum: City of the Greeks and Romans	(Film Edizioni Scienza e Tecnica)	c-21m	June 1, 1959	Video
Ancient Palestine	Robert E. Cooley	c-14m	September 3, 1968	Video
Ancient Persia	Pinhas P. Delougaz	c-11m	September 1, 1964	
Ancient Rome	David A. Smart (producer); I.O. Foster	bw-11m	May 18, 1949	Video
Ancient Rome (2nd edition)		c-11m	July 18, 1977	
Ancient World Inheritance	David A. Smart (producer); Richard A. Parker	c-10m	May 7, 1946	Video
Andrew Jackson at the Hermitage	John William Ward	c-17m	April 1, 1964	
Anessi's Barkcloth Art: Tonga	(Sunrise Films of Toronto); Paul Quigley	c-24m	1981	World Cultures & Youth (Canada: Spread Your Wings); also known as Anessi in the Kingdom Of Tonga
Angles and Their Measurements	H. Vernon Price	c-11m	September 4, 1962	Video
Angina		c-14m	1980	Cardiology: You & Your Heart
Animal Babies Grow Up	T. R. Porter	c-11m	February 17, 1967	
Animal Babies Grow Up	(Centron Corporation); advisers: Dennis A, Merritt & Sheryle M. Roche)	c-10m	1983	Video
Animal Behavior: Babies and Their Parents	Douglas L. Lieberman	c-12m	1991	
Animal Behavior: Finding and Building Homes		c-14m	1993	
Animal Behavior: Living in Societies		c-12m	1991	
Animal Behavior, The Mechanism of Imprinting		c-14m	September 19, 1977	Video
Animal Behavior: Migration		c-14m	1993	
Animal Behavior: Protection		c-12m	1993	
Animal Communities and Groups	Glenn O. Blough	c-11m	January 2, 1963	
Animal Hide and Seek: Camouflage for Beginners	T. R. Porter	c-10m	June 2, 1969	
Animals and How They Communicate	N. E. Bingham	c-11m	August 30, 1966	Video
Animals and Their Foods		bw-11m	August 30, 1955	Video
Animals and Their Homes		bw-11m	August 25, 1955	
Animals and What They Do		c-series	October 25, 1974	
Animals Are Different and Alike	Herbert A. Smith	c-11m	January 15, 1965	Video
Animals Are Different and Alike	Joel Marks & Mike Carlson (producer); Mel Waskin	c-13m	1990	
Animals of Africa	Lawrence F. Lowery & Mary Sue Kerner	c-13m	March 21, 1977	
Animals Protect Themselves	Glenn O. Blough	c-11m	March 1, 1960	
Animals That Live in Water		c-13m	November 5, 1970	
Animals with Backbones		c-11m	July 3, 1957	
Animals with Backbones	Mike Carlson	c-15m	1989	Snippet video
Animals without Backbones		bw-11m	April 11, 1965	
Animals without Backbones	Mike Carlson	c-15m	1989	
Another Bad Month at Grey's Grocery	Jack L. Nelson & William B. Stanley	c-13m	December 28, 1977	Changing Scene
The Ant and the Grasshopper (An Aesop Fable)	Gakken Company, Ltd., Tokyo, Japan (producer)	c-11m	1967	Stop motion animation
The Ant Colony Through the Year		bw-10m	January 3, 1967	
The Apache Indian	David A. Smart (producer); Alfred Whiting	c-10m	July 26, 1945	Office of Indian Affairs
The Apache Indian (2nd edition)		c-10m	June 5, 1975	Snippet video
The Appalachian Highlands	Henry J. Warman	c-14m	October 2, 1967	North American Regions
Appreciating Our Parents	David A. Smart (producer); Ted Peshak; consultant: Reuben Hill	c-10m	August 17, 1950	Video
Aptitudes and Occupations	David A. Smart (producer); E. G. Williamson & Milton E. Hahn	bw-10m	June 6, 1941	
Aptitudes and Occupations (2nd Edition)	E. G. Williamson	c-15m	1964	Video
Aquatic Ecosystems: Estuaries	Joel Marks & Elizabeth Green (producer); advisers: Robert B. Willey & Michael J. O'Hare	c-12m	1993	
Aquatic Ecosystems: Freshwater Wetlands	Joel Marks & Elizabeth Green (producer); advisers: Robert B. Willey & Michael J. O'Hare	c-12m	1993	
Aquatic Insects	Thomas Park	bw-11m	July 1, 1968	Video
Archery for Girls	David A. Smart (producer); Jess Puckett	bw-10m	April 13, 1949	
Arctic Borderlands in Winter (Manitoba)	David A. Smart (producer); Paul E. Kambley	bw-10m	April 8, 1948	Video
Arctic: The Great White Desert	(Pathé Cinéma); Joel Marks, Francios Flouqet & Henri de Turenne (producers); Douglas L. Lieberman	c-15m	1988	Great Deserts of the World
Are You a Good Citizen?	David A. Smart (producer); Ted Peshak; consultant: Jerome G. Kerwin	bw-11m	July 12, 1949	Video
Are You Popular?	David A. Smart (producer); Ted Peshak; consultant: Alice Sowers	c-10m	August 29, 1947	Video
Are You Popular? (New)	consultant: Alice Sowers	c-11m	1958	revised version; Video
Are You Ready for Marriage?	David A. Smart (producer); Ted Peshak; consultant: Gil Altschul	bw-14m	April 11, 1950	Video
Aristotle and the Scientific Method	John S. Richardson	bw-14m	September 1, 1959	
Arithmetic: Estimating and Checking Answers	Harl R. Douglass	c-11m	February 1, 1962	Video
Arithmetic in the Food Store	Herbert F. Spitzer	c-11m	January 2, 1964	
Arithmetic: Understanding the Problem	E.T. McSwain	c-11m	September 1, 1961	
Art and Life in Italy	David A. Smart (producer); George T. Miller	c-11m	October 27, 1950	Video
Art Appreciation: Enjoying Paintings	Jack Arends	c-14m	April 28, 1972	Video
Art for Beginners: Fun with Lines	Harlan E. Hoffa	c-11m	May 16, 1973	rereleased in 1990
Art of Film: Performance In Depth, The Many Roles of Alec Guinness	Janus Films; Saul J. Turell, Steve Greenburg & Aubrey Solomon; narrator: Douglas Fairbanks Jr.	c-28m	1978	Released by Perspective Films in 1979
Art of Film: The Camera	Janus Films; Saul J. Turell & Jeff Lieberman; narrator: Rod Serling	c-20m	1975	Released by Perspective Films in 1979; Video
Art of Film: The Director	Janus Films; Saul J. Turell & Jeff Lieberman; narrator: Rod Serling	c-23m	1975	Released by Perspective Films in 1979
Art of Film: The Edited Image	Janus Films; Saul J. Turell & Jeff Lieberman	c-21m	1975	Released by Perspective Films in 1979
Art of Film: The Emerging Chaplin	Janus Films; Israel Berman; narrator: Douglas Fairbanks Jr.	c-27m	1979	Co-produced by Perspective Films, covering Charlie Chaplin
Art of Film: The Great Chase (The Chase in the Evolution of Film)	Janus Films; Harvey Cort, Paul Killiam & Saul J. Turell	part c-35m	1977	Released by Perspective Films in 1979
Art of Film: Music and Sound	Janus Films; Saul J. Turell & Jeff Lieberman; narrator: Rod Serling	c-21m	1975	Released by Perspective Films in 1979; Video
Art of Film: Performance	Janus Films; Saul J. Turell & Jeff Lieberman	c-25m	1975	Released by Perspective Films in 1979
Art of Film: The Role of Women in the Movies	Janus Films; Saul J. Turell	part c-29m	1977	Released by Perspective Films in 1979; Snippet video
Art of Film: Screenwriting	Janus Films; Saul J. Turell & Jeff Lieberman; narrator: Rod Serling	c-23m	1975	Released by Perspective Films in 1979
Art of Film: Vintage Hitchcock	Janus Films; Saul J. Turell, Steve Greenburg & Aubrey Solomon; narrator: Douglas Fairbanks Jr.	part c-27m	1979	Co-produced by Perspective Films; profiling Alfred Hitchcock
Arthropods: Insects and Their Relatives	Thomas Park	c-11m	November 1, 1960	
Asia: A Continental Overview	Joseph E. Spencer	c-16m	October 8, 1964	Video
The Atlantic and Gulf Coastal Plains	Henry J. Warman	c-14m	October 2, 1967	North American Regions
Atomic Research: Areas and Development	John Smart (producer); R. Will Burnett	bw-14m	September 9, 1953	Video
Attitudes and Health	David A. Smart (producer); Ted Peshak; consultants: Dean F. Smiley & Fred V. Hein	bw-10m	April 11, 1949	Video
Audio-Visual Materials in Teaching		bw-15m	February 1, 1956	Video
Audubon and the Birds of America		c-16m	May 10, 1957	Video
Australia: The Land and the People	Hew Roberts	c-17m	April 3, 1957	Video
Austria, Past and Present	Norman J.G. Pounds	c-11m	October 3, 1966	
Automation: What It Is and What It Does	Virgil M. Rogers	c-14m	January 3, 1966	
Autumn Comes to the City		c-11m	January 5, 1970	
Autumn Comes to the Forest	Alfred T. Collette	c-11m	April 21, 1972	Video
Autumn Is an Adventure	David A. Smart (producer); Dora V. Smith	c-11m	June 4, 1952	Background for Reading & Expression
The Aztecs	I. James Quillen (collaborator)	c-11m	March 30, 1955	Video

== B ==
Title	Major credits (mostly advisers prior to '70s)	Black & white or color (& running time)	Year / copyright date	Notes
Baboons	(BBC); Mel Waskin	c-11m	1988	Eye On Nature
Background for Literature: The Lady of the Lake	David A. Smart (producer); J. Paul Leonard	bw-11m	May 18, 1949	Video
Background for Reading: Stories of Holland	David A. Smart (producer); Wendell W. Wright	bw-10m	March 9, 1949	
Badminton Fundamentals	David A. Smart (producer); Kenneth R. Davidson	c-11m	September 29, 1950	
The Bagworm		c-11m	July 1, 1968	
Balance Your Diet for Health and Appearance	Ross L. Allen	c-11m	May 11, 1960	
Banking on Bob	David A. Smart (producer)	bw-15m	August 30, 1950	
Banks and Credit	David A. Smart (producer); James Harvey Dodd	bw-11m	June 11, 1948	Video
Bardell Vs Pickwick	Desmond Davis	c-25m-(DR	October 1, 1959	
Barn Swallow	W. J. Beecher	c-11m	April 4, 1968	Video
Baseball Fundamentals	David A. Smart (producer); Emmett Branch McCracken	bw-10m	May 12, 1942	
Basic Court Procedures	David A. Smart (producer); Fred E. Inbau	c-14m	December 5, 1949	Video
Basic Fibers in Cloth	David A. Smart (producer); Florence M. King	bw-10m	April 22, 1948	
Basic Job Skills: Handling Criticism	Dean R. Malsbary & Richard J. Zuromski	c-10m	1976	
Basic Skills	Theodore L. Harris	c-14m	June 25, 1968	Reading Growth
Basic Tumbling Skills	Joe Giallombardo & Otto E. Ryser	c-15m	November 22, 1974	
Basketball for Girls: Fundamental Techniques		c-11m	August 17, 1972	
Basketball for Girls: Fundamentals	David A. Smart (producer); Mildred B. Wohlford	bw-10m	November 29, 1948	
Basketball for Girls: Game Play	David A. Smart (producer); Mildred B. Wohlford	bw-10m	November 29, 1948	
Basketball Fundamentals	Branch McCracken	bw-14m	1942	Video
Basketball Fundamentals	Edwin Jucker & Taylo Baker	c-14m	March 2, 1964	
Batting Fundamentals	David A. Smart (producer); James Smilgoff	c-10m	March 5, 1946	Video
The Bear and Its Relatives	Donald Hatfield & Eliot Williams	bw-11m	1941	
Bear Hunt	David A. Smart (producer)	c-15m	August 30, 1950	
Becoming a Pro on the Phone	(Centron Corporation); Joel Marks (producer); Lillian Spina; production manager: Rachel Goodstein	c-13m	1983	Telemarketing
Beethoven and His Music		c-13m	April 23, 1954	Famous Composers; Video
The Beetle		c-11m	July 1, 1968	
Beginning French	John Smart (producer)	bw-10m	November 16, 1953	
Beginning Good Posture Habits	Clifford L. Brownell	c-11m	October 3, 1957	
Beginning Responsibility: Being a Good Sport	Ira J. Gordon	c-11m	March 3, 1969	
Beginning Responsibility: Being on Time		c-11m	1956	Video
Beginning Responsibility: Being on Time (2nd edition)	consultant: Jean M. Lepere	c-11m	March 14, 1973	
Beginning Responsibility: Books and Their Care	Mildred Batchelder	c-11m	March 27, 1959	Video
Beginning Responsibility: The Broken Bookshop		c-13m	1979	Video
Beginning Responsibility: Doing Things for Ourselves in School (I Can Do It)	Lawrence E. Vredevoe	c-11m	October 1, 1963	Video
Beginning Responsibility: Getting Ready for School	Marvin D. Glock	c-11m	March 3, 1969	
Beginning Responsibility: Learning to Follow Instructions	James L. Hymes Jr.	c-10m	February 1, 1968	Video
Beginning Responsibility: A Lunchroom Goes Bananas		c-12m	1970	
Beginning Responsibility: A Lunchroom Goes Bananas (2nd edition)	Tom Chamberlin	c-12m	1978	Video
Beginning Responsibility: Lunchroom Manners	Ross L. Allen	bw-10m	June 1, 1960	Video
Beginning Responsibility: Manners in Public	Lucile Lindberg	bw-11m	April 21, 1975	
Beginning Responsibility: Other Peoples' Things	Marvin D. Glock	c-11m	January 8, 1957	
Beginning Responsibility: Rules at School	James L. Hymes Jr.	c-11m	December 31, 1964	
Beginning Responsibility: Taking Care of Things	David A. Smart (producer); William E. Young	bw-10m	March 19, 1951	Video
Beginning Responsibility: Taking Care of Things You Share (2nd edition)		c-11m	March 31, 1978	Video
Beginning Responsibility: Taking Care of Your Own Things		c-11m	March 1, 1977	Video
Beginning Responsibility: Using Money Wisely	Gilbert M. Wilson	c-11m	March 1, 1967	Video
Beginning Swimming	(Jorha Pictures); Frances Dixon	bw-11m	February 15, 1955	
Beginning Tumbling	David A. Smart (producer); Karl W. Bookwalter & Otto Ryser	bw-10m	1941 (revised December 14, 1945)	
Beginnings and Growth of Industrial America	Carl Bridenbaugh	bw-10m	March 1, 1960	Video
Behavior in Animals and Plants	John S. Richardson	c-11m	July 8, 1957	
Behavioral Biology	Martin W. Schien	c-15m	1982	Biological Sciences; Video
Belgium and the Netherlands: The Lands and the People	Zoe A. Thralis	c-11m	May 6, 1955	Video
The Benefits of Looking Ahead	David A. Smart (producer); Ted Peshak; consultant: Harl R. Douglass	bw-10m	December 11, 1950	Video
Benjamin Franklin		c-28m	1987	Part animation
Bertrand Russell	(Chantern Films)	c-5 shorts (14m each)	1970	
Better Choice of Words (Effective Communication)	David A. Smart (producer); Paul R. Wendt	bw-11m	March 28, 1952, revised 2nd version 1975	Video
Better Use of Leisure Time	David A. Smart (producer); Ted Peshak; consultant: Paul H. Landis	c-11m	December 11, 1950	Video
Beyond Our Solar System	Henry J. Otto	bw-11m	February 3, 1959	
Bicycle Safety	Linda K. Haskins	c (video)-12m	1987	Video
Bicycle Safety Skills		c-11m	March 1, 1957	
Big and Small	Willard Abraham	c-10m	February 12, 1973	Video
The Big Lighthouse and the Little Steamship		c-6m	July 1, 1970	
Big Mouth Goes to the Dentist		c-13m	1979	
Big Sun and Our Earth	Richard Weaver	c-10m	July 3, 1957	
The Big Thicket	(Jim Seymour Associates)	c-11m	1970	
Big Wide Highway		c-10m	October 4, 1955	Video
A Bike, a Birthday		c-10m	1976	Video
Bike Super Stars	Richard D. Spear & Marsha Jackson	c-12m	August 17, 1976	Video
Billy's Helicopter Ride	Paul E. Kambly	c-11m	January 2, 1962	Video
Billy's Helicopter Ride 2nd ed "Helicopter Ride"		c-14m	1979	Video
Biography of a Red-winged Blackbird	David A. Smart (producer); Arthur Augustus Allen	c-10m	1943	Video
Biology in Space Science		c-14m	January 19, 1966	
Biology in Today's World	Paul E. Kambly	c-10m	May 28, 1962	Video
Biomes: Coniferous Forest	Douglas L. Liebman	c-12m	1989	
Biomes: Desert	Douglas L. Liebman	c-12m	1989	
Biomes: Grassland	Douglas L. Liebman	c-12m	1989	
Biomes: An Introduction	Douglas L. Liebman	c-12m	1989	
Biomes: Temperate Deciduous Forest	Douglas L. Liebman	c-12m	1989	
Biomes: Tropical Rain Forest	Douglas L. Liebman	c-12m	1989	
Biomes: Tundra	Douglas L. Liebman	c-12m	1989	Snippet video
Bionics	Frank A. Brown	c-11m	1978	Video
Birds and Their Characteristics	Albert Wolfson	c-11m	June 13, 1961	Video
Birds and Their Homes	Herbert A. Smith	c-10m	July 3, 1967	Video
Birds: How We Identify Them	N. Eldred Bingham	c-11m	June 27, 1960	Video
Birds in Winter		c-11m	April 11, 1975	
Birds in Winter	David A. Smart (producer); Philip A. DuMont	c-11m	December 5, 1946	
Birds of the Arctic		c-12m	March 25, 1974	Video
Birds of the Countryside	Olin Sewall Pettingill Jr.	c-10m	1945, revised January 12, 1954, revised 3rd edition 1962	Video (1962 version)
Birds of the Dooryard	Olin Sewall Pettingill Jr.	c-10m	1944, revised January 12, 1954	
Birds of the Inland Waterways	Olin Sewall Pettingill Jr.	c-11m	1946, revised October 15, 1965	Video
Birds of the Marshes	Olin Sewall Pettingill Jr.	c-11m	1943, revised October 15, 1965	
Birds of Our Storybooks	Ralph C. Preston	c-11m	January 20, 1955	
Birds of the Sea		c-11m	October 18, 1965	
Birds of Shore and Marsh		c-14m	December 1973	
Birds of the Woodlands	Olin Sewall Pettingill Jr.	c-11m	1946, revised April 22, 1969	
Birds That Hunt		c-16m	January 11, 1975	Video
Birds That Migrate	Julian Greenlee	c-17m	March 26, 1968	Video
Birth of a Bronze: Jacques Lipchit	Walter Lewisohn	c-14m	1973	
The Birth of Puppies		c-16m	July 8, 1969	Video
Birthplace of a Nation: Living in the New England States		c-13m	October 3, 1974	Video
Blackie, Sheepdog of New Zealand		c-10m	1982	
Blood: Composition and Functions	Adviser: Irving F. Miller	c-14m	October 3, 1978	Video
Blow, Wind, Blow	David A. Smart (producer)	c-11m	May 1, 1952	Background for Reading & Expression; Video
Boats: Buoyancy, Stability, Propulsion		c-13m	March 31, 1959	
The Bobolink and Blue Jay	David A. Smart (producer); Olin Sewall Pettingill Jr.	c-11m	1946	
Bolivar: South American Liberator		c-12m	January 2, 1962	Video
Bones and Movement	Bill Walker & Joel Marks (producer); Mel Waskin	c-11m	1988	Your Active Body
A Book Is to Care For	LaVern Walther	c-12m	April 1, 1969	Video
Bookkeeping and Accounting (2nd edition)		c-11m	February 21, 1974	
Bookkeeping and You	David A. Smart (producer); Paul A. Carlson & Hamden L. Forkner	c-11m	March 10, 1947	Video (BW version)
Boy and Girl of Britain	Vincent R. Rogers & Bud Church	c-16m	April 23, 1976	Video
Boy of the Circus		c-14m	April 2, 1956	
Boy of a Frontier Fort		c-11m	March 3, 1958	
Boy of India: Rama and His Elephant	Paul R. Wendt	c-12m	January 31, 1956	
Boy of Japan: Ito and His Kite	Frank E. Sorenson	c-11m	March 2, 1964	
Boy of Mexico: Juan and His Donkey	William G. Brink	bw-13m	January 3, 1955	Video
Boy of the Navajos	J. Lawrence Walkup	c-11m	February 16, 1956, revised 2nd version 1975	
Boy of the Netherlands	A. Sterl Artley	c-11m	February 7, 1957	
Boy of Quebec	Eric Winter	c-12m	June 28, 1973	
Boy of Renaissance Italy	Lewis Paul Todd	c-13m	June 5, 1957	
Boy of the Seminoles: Indians of the Everglades	Wendell W Wright & James Black	c-11m	February 21, 1956	
Boyhood of Abraham Lincoln	O. O. Winther	c-14m	1968	Video
The Boyhood of George Washington	Ralph W. Cordier	c-11m	September 3, 1957, revised 2nd version 1975	
The Boyhood of George Washington Carver	Kenneth R. Johnson	c-13m	January 29, 1973	
The Boyhood of Thomas Edison	Arthur W. Foshay	c-15m	June 4, 1964, revised 2nd version 1978	Video
A Boy's Journey Through the Day		c-11m	February 6, 1970	
Brahms and His Music	Hazel Gertrude Kinscella	c-14m	June 4, 1957	Famous Composers; Video
The Brasses	Traugott Rohner	c-11m	March 10, 1955	Instruments of the Band and Orchestra
Brazil: People of the Frontier		c-16m	November 14, 1969	
Breathing and Respiration	Bill Walker & Joel Marks (producer); Mel Waskin	c-10m	1988	Your Active Body
Briar Rose, the Sleeping Beauty		c-12m	1986	Video
The British Commonwealth of Nations	Frederick C. Dietz	c-14m	January 2, 1964	Video
The British Isles: The Land and the People	David A. Smart (producer); Thomas Frank Barton	c-11m	June 28, 1951	Video
Broad Jump	David A. Smart (producer); Dean B. Cromwell	bw-10m	May 4, 1946	
Brown Bears Go Fishing		c-11m	October 3, 1955, revised 2nd edition 1981	Video
Brushing and Flossing Techniques		c-8m	1983	Video
Brushing Up on Division	E. T. McSwain	c-11m	November 1, 1961	Video
Brushing Up on Multiplication	E. T. McSwain	c-11m	November 2, 1961	
Buddhist World	Robert M. Perry	c-11m	December 31, 1963	
Budgeting Your Money		c-14m	February 1976	Consumer Skills; Video
Buffy, the Bored Raccoon	writer: Steve Nelson	c-10m	1982	
Build Your Vocabulary	David A. Smart (producer); John J. DeBoer	bw-12m	October 8, 1948	Video
Build Your Vocabulary (2nd edition)	John J. DeBoer	c-14m	1967	Video
Building Better Paragraphs	John Smart (producer); Ruth Strang	c-11m	October 9, 1953, revised 2nd version 1971	Video
Building Better Sentences		c-13m	April 2, 1968	
Building a Foundation for Powerful Teams	Joel Marks (producer); Kathy Dale McNair	c-23m	1992	Straight Talk on Teams
Building an Outline	David A. Smart (producer); William G. Brink	bw-10m	June 9, 1948	Video
Building Puppets with Pierrot		c-7m	1979	Video
Building Typing Skill	David A. Smart (producer); D. D. Lessenberry	bw-11m	October 30, 1947	
Bulgaria: The Land and the People	Norman J.G. Pounds	c-11m	-April 1, 1969	
Bully on the Bus	Joel Marks & Cathy Hurwitz (producers); Richard Ball	c-15m	1994	
Buoyancy	adviser: Marion P. Harris	c-14m	1985	
Bushy, the Squirrel		c-11m	October 11, 1957	Background for Reading & Expression
Business Manners and Customs	James R. Meehan	c-14m	November 9, 1972	Office Practice
The Busy Airport		c-11m	May 1, 1963	
A Busy Day at the County Fair	R.K. Bent	c-11m	May 1, 1963	Video
The Busy Harbor	C.W. Hunnicutt	c-11m	January 4, 1960	Video
Butterflies	(BBC); Mel Waskin	c-11m	1988	Eye On Nature
Butterfly and Moth Life Cycles		c-13m	November 1, 1968	
Butterfly Botanists	David A. Smart (producer); Edwin Way Teale	c-11m	August 29, 1947	
Butterfly: A Life Cycle of an Insect	Michael J. Wade & Mary R. Changnon	c-9m	February 4, 1955, revised 2nd version 1977	Video
Buying for Immediate Use	Stewart M. Lee & D. Hayden Green	c-14m	February 13, 1976	Consumer Skills
Buying for Longterm Use	(Spectrun)	c-14m	February 13, 1976	Consumer Skills
Buying on Credit	Stewart M. Lee & D. Hayden Green	c-14m	February 13, 1976	Consumer Skills
Buying Services	Stewart M. Lee & D. Hayden Green	c-14m	February 13, 1976	Consumer Skills; Video
The Byzantine Empire	Crane Brinton	c-11m	December 1, 1959	Video

== C ==
Title	Major credits (mostly advisers prior to '70s)	Black & white or color (& running time)	Year / copyright date	Notes
Calendar: Days, Weeks, Months		bw-11m	July 27, 1954	
Calendar: Story of Its Development		c-11m	March 12, 1959	
Camouflage in Nature by Form and Color Matching	David A. Smart (producer); Harriett M. Smith: camera: A. M. Bailey, Olin Sewall Pettingill Jr., A. L. Melander	c-10m	March 5, 1946	
Camouflage in Nature by Pattern Matching	David A. Smart (producer); Harriett M. Smith	c-33m	March 5, 1946	
Camouflage in Nature through Pattern Matching	J. Myron Atkin	c-11m	1964	Video
Can I Sit On a Cloud?	Bill Walker (producer); script: Mel Waskin	c-11m	1987	Wonder World of Science (part animated); Video
Canada: Geography of the Americas	W. R. McConnell	c-14m	September 1, 1956	
Canada: Provinces and People	Thomas R. Weir	c-14m	March 15, 1973	
Canada's Atlantic Provinces	Thomas R. Weir	c-14m	February 23, 1973	Video
Canada's Central Provinces	Thomas R. Weir	c-14m	March 2, 1973	
Canada's History: Colony to Commonwealth	Alfred L. Burt	c-16m	March 1, 1962	
Canada's Pacific Provinces and Northland	Thomas R. Weir	c-14m	March 2, 1973	
Canada's Prairie Provinces	Thomas R. Weir	c-14m	March 16, 1973	
Canada's Provinces and People	Thomas R. Weir	c-14m	1973	Video
Capitalism	David A. Smart (producer); Harvey Dodd & David A. Smith	bw-10m	September 28, 1948	Video
Captain Beetle Goes to Sea		c-9m	1976	
Carbon and Its Components	Therald Moeller	c-14m	January 4, 1971	Video
Carbon and Its Compounds	David A. Smart (producer); Therald Moeller	bw-10m	January 19, 1949	Video
Careers in Agriculture		c-13m	April 18, 1958	Video
Careers in the Building Trades		c-11m	October 18, 1958	
Caring For Your Mouth		c-14m	1982	Dentistry Today
Carl Sandburg Discusses His Work	interview: Edward R. Murrow	bw-15m	March 1, 1961	Video
Carl Sandburg Discusses Lincoln	interview: Edward R. Murrow	bw-13m	March 1, 1961	
Carnival Comes to Town	Helen Heffernan	c-11m	May 1, 1956	Video
The Carpenter's Three Wishes		c-8m	1971	
Catching Fundamentals	David A. Smart (producer); James Smilgoff	c-10m	November 14, 1946	
Caterpillars Grow and Change	James R. Wailes	c-11m	June 1, 1971	Video
Causes of the Seasons	John S. Richardson	c-11m	September 4, 1964	Video
Celebrate	(Kinocraft) Brad Shapiro	c-24m	1993	
The Cell: Structural Unit of Life	David A. Smart (producer); William A. Thurber, William B. Clemens	bw-11m	February 15, 1949	
The Cell: Structural Unit of Life	Merrill L. Gassman & Jon H. Emerson	c-11m	November 29, 1976	
Cell Biology	(BioMedia Associates); Bruce J. Russell & J. David Denning	c-15m	1981	Biological Sciences; video
Cell Biology: The Cytoplasm	Bill Walker (producer); Bruce J. Russell	c-15m	1989	Video
Cell Biology: Life Functions	Leslie R. Hedrick & William F. Danforth	c-11m	May 3, 1965	Video
Cell Biology: The Living Cell	Bill Walker (producer); Bruce J. Russell	c-15	1989	Video
Cell Biology: Mitosis and DNA	Leslie R. Hedrick & William F. Danforth	c-11m	May 3, 1965	Video
Cell Biology: The Nucleus	Bill Walker (producer); Bruce J. Russell	c-14m	1989	Video
Cell Biology: The Plasma Membrane	Bill Walker (producer); Bruce J. Russell	c-15m	1988	Video
Cell Biology: Structure and Composition	Leslie R. Hedrick & William F. Danforth	c-11m	May 3, 1965	Video
Cell Differentiation: The Search For the Organizer	Bill Walker (producer); script: Douglas L. Lieberman	c-15m	1984	
Cells and What They Do	Merrill L. Gassman	c-11m	January 11, 1975	Video
Cells of Plants and Animals	Hewson Swift	c-11m	September 24, 1969	
Cells, Tissues and Organs		c-10m	May 6, 1977	Nature of Life
Central America	David A. Smart (producer)	bw-10m	1944	
Central America: Geography of the Americas	William J. Ketteringham	bw-11m	April 8, 1955, revised 2nd version 1977	
The Central Lowlands	Henry J. Warman	c-14m	October 2, 1967	North American Regions; Video
Centripetal Force and Satellite Orbits	Charles H. Bachman	c-10m	June 1, 1962	Video
Changing Frontier Lands: Living in the Rocky Mountain States		c-15m	October 3, 1974	Video
Charlemagne and His Empire	George L. Mosse	c-14m	May 22, 1961	
Charles Dickens: Background for His Works	David A. Smart (producer); J. Paul Leonard	bw-11m	July 12, 1949	Video
The Check-up Detectives		c-15m	1983	Healthwise; Video
Checker-Cashier	Daniel H. Kruger	c-10m	1975	My First Job
Chemical Bond and Atomic Structure	Paul M. Wright	c-16m	March 1, 1963	
Chemical Bonding and Atomic Structure	(Don Lane Pictures); Roger Mazur (producer); script: Douglas L. Lieberman & Mel Waskin	c-20m	1983	Chemistry
Chemical Changes All About Us	Donald G. Decker	c-15m	October 4, 1960	
Chemical Properties of Water	Therald Moeller	c-13m	December 31, 1964	
Chemistry Laboratory Series		c-13m	December 12, 1959	
Chicago Stock Exchange	John V. Tinn & Sidney Parry	c-16m	1942	
Chief Executive	(Focus Enterprises Inc.) Joel Marks; cast: Thomas E. Cronin	c-10m	1990	Modern President
Children and Heart Disease		c-15m	1982	Cardiology: You & Your Heart
Children of Bali		c-26m	1989	Day in the Life of a Child
Children of Brazil		c-26m	1989	Day in the Life of a Child
Children of Ghana		c-26m	1989	Day in the Life of a Child
Children of Guatemala		c-26m	1989	Day in the Life of a Child
Children of Morocco		c-26m	1989	Day in the Life of a Child
Children of Rwanda		c-26m	1989	Day in the Life of a Child
Children of Zimbabwe		c-26m	1989	Day in the Life of a Child
Children on the Move	(Smart Family Foundation)	c-22m	December 1, 1964	
A Child's Day (In) East Timor		c-26m	1989	Day in the Life of a Child
China and Its Agriculture	Canute Vandermeer	c-16m	October 1, 1969	
China and Its Industry	Canute Vandermeer	c-16m	October 2, 1969	
China and Its People	Canute Vandermeer	c-16m	October 1, 1969	
China: The Land and the People	George B. Creasey	c-15m	September 15, 1955	Video
Choosing Books to Read	David A. Smart (producer); John J. De Boer	c-10m	March 29, 1948, revised 2nd version 1971	Video
Choosing Your Marriage Partner	David A. Smart (producer)	c-15m	June 30, 1952	
Choosing Your Occupation	David A. Smart (producer); John N. Given	bw-10m	April 13, 1949	Video
Chordates, Diversity in Structure	William V. Mayer	c-14m	November 5, 1969	Video
Christianity in World History (To 1000 AD)	William L. Wannemacher	c-16m	December 3, 1963	Video
A Christmas Carol	(Dickensian Society)	c-25m	October 1, 1959	
Christmas Customs Near and Far		c-14m	September 26, 1955	Video
Christmas in the Village 1840s (Black Creek Pioneer Village of Toronto)		c-15m	1974	
Christmas on Grandfather's Farm 1890s (Octagon House Museum)		c-22m	July 22, 1958	
Christmas Time in Europe	(Concordia Publishing House); Heari Storch	c-22m	1971	
Chromium and Manganese		bw-37m	1969	
Circulatory System	Bill Walker	c-16m	1980	Human Body; Video
Circulatory System (2nd edition)	Bill Walker & Joel Marks (producers); Douglas L. Lieberman; advisers: June B. Steinberg & Allan B. Sutow	c-16m	1993	Human Body; snippet video
Cities Are Different and Alike	Frank J. Estvan	c-11m	April 1, 1971	
Cities: Why They Grow	David A. Smart (producer); Arthur M. Weimer	bw-12m	June 20, 1949	
Citizenship and You	Ted Peshak	bw-12m	October 1, 1959	Video
City Fire Fighters	David A. Smart (producer); Viola Theman	c-10m	July 14, 1947	Video
A City Grows: The Skyscraper	Frank J. Estvan	c-10m	July 9, 1977	Video
City Pets: Fun and Responsibility	John Smart (producer); A. M. Johnston	c-10m	November 2, 1953	Video
The Civil War		c-4 shorts (80m total)	1983	
The Civil War: 1863-1865	Brainerd Dyer	c-16m	March 24, 1964	
The Civil War: Background Issues	Brainerd Dyer	c-16m	September 3, 1963	
The Civil War: First Two Years	Brainerd Dyer	c-10m	September 3, 1963, revised 2nd version 1983	Video (1983 version)
The Civil War: Postwar Period	Kenneth M. Stampp	c-10m	March 17, 1964	Video
Classifying Organisms		c-15m	1984	
Classifying Plants and Animals	John Urban	c-11m	February 1, 1961	
Clean Power	c-15m	1983	Healthwise	
Cleanliness and Health	David A. Smart (producer); N.E. Bingham	c-11m	January 19, 1949, revised 2nd edition 1968	Video (2nd edition with minor changes)
Clever Hikoichi		c-12m	1974	
Climate and the World We Live In	Zoe A. Thralls	c-14m	November 14, 1957	
Climates and Seasons	Harold D. Drummond	c-10m	October 4, 1973	
Climates of the United States	Zoe A. Thralls	c-11m	November 1, 1962, revised 2nd version 1978	Video (1962 version)
Clothes and You: Line and Proportion	Ted Peshak	bw-10m	September 20, 1954	
Clothes Around the World	Roy A. Price	c-11m	January 13, 1969	
Clothing for Children	Alida Shinn & Roselma Messman	c-11m	March 5, 1946	
Clouds and Precipitation	Bill Walker (producer)	c-15m	1985	Atmospheric Science; Video
Coalition Builder	(Focus Enterprises Inc.) Joel Marks; cast: Thomas E. Cronin	c-15m	1990	Modern President
College: Your Challenge	John Smart (producer); Ted Peshak; consultant: Francis J. Brown	bw-11m	August 31, 1953	Video
Colloidal State	Frederic B. Dutton	c-16m	May 1, 1959	
Colonial Expansion of European Nations	Frederick C. Dietz	bw-13m	December 6, 1955	
Colonial Family of New France		c-13m	May 6, 1958	
Colonial Life in the Middle Colonies	W. Linwood Chase	c-11m	May 31, 1955, revised 2nd version 1975	Snippet video
Colonial Life in New England (Storrowtown Village)	W. Linwood Chase	c-11m	May 24, 1955, revised 2nd version 1975	Snippet video
Colonial Life in the South	William H. Hartley	c-13m	May 31, 1955, revised 2nd version 1975	Snippet video
Colonial Life on a Dutch Manor (Van Cortlandt Manor Restoration)	Walter P. Lewisohn	c-16m	May 6, 1969	
Colonial Shipbuilding and Sea Trade		c-11m	November 4, 1958	Video
Color and Light: An Introduction	Fletcher Guard Watson	c-11m	May 3, 1961, revised 2nd version 1977	Video
Color and Pigment in Art		c-14m	May 1, 1967	Video
Color Categorizing Behavior of Rhesus Monkeys	(University of Wisconsin); Dr. Benjamin Weinstein	c-10m	1943	Video
Color, Color Everywhere		c-15m	May 23, 1972	
Color for Beginners	Clifford G. McCollum	c-11m	December 1, 1966	
The Colorado River	David A. Smart (producer); Clifford M. Zierer	bw-11m	July 7, 1947	Video
Come See the Dolphins	George B. Rabb	c-13m	January 17, 1975	Video
Comets, Meteors and Asteroids	Joel Marks (producer); Mel Waskin; advisers: Noel Swerdlow & Jim Morevec	c-14m	1986	Space Science; Video
Communicating Effectively		c-18m	1992	
Communication for Beginners	Paul W. Eberman	c-11m	January 4, 1960	
Communication in the Modern World	Paul W. Eberman	c-11m	March 9, 1959	Video
Communication: The Message	Robert S. Goyer & Mary G. Colvario	c-14m	November 8, 1977	
Communication: The Receiver	Robert S. Goyer & Mary G. Colvario	c-14m	November 8, 1977	
Communication: The Sender	Robert S. Goyer & Mary G. Colvario	c-14m	November 8, 1977	Video
Communication: Story of Its Development		bw-11m	October 29, 1959	
Communism	David A. Smart (producer)	bw-11m	March 15, 1952	Are You Ready for the Service?; Video
Communities Depend on Each Other	Ellis F. Hartford	c-11m	July 1, 1969	Video
Communities Keep Clean	Frank J. Estvan	c-11m	July 1, 1969	
Community Governments: How They Function	John Smart (producer); John Day Larkin	bw-13m	June 15, 1953	Video
Competition in Business		c-14m	December 1, 1961	Video
Conducting a Termination	Joel Marks (producer); Linda K Haskins	c-8m	1985	
Coniferous Forest	(Riverside Pix); Gerald Berg	c-20m	1988	Wilderness Ecology; snippet video
Conservation for Beginners	Carl S. Johnson	c-11m	November 1, 1967	
Conserving Our Environment: The Pollution Crisis	Carl S. Johnson	c-14m	January 30, 1973	Video Video (Spanish version)
Conserving Our Environment: Use and Reuse	Carl S. Johnson	c-14m	January 30, 1973	Video
Conserving Our Forests Today	Walter Howard Schaeffer	c-11m	July 1, 1960	
Conserving Our Mineral Resources Today		c-11m	September 1, 1966	
Conserving Our Soil Today	Howard H. Michaud	c-11m	July 1, 1960	
Conserving Our Water Resources Today	Samuel N. Dicken	c-11m	July 2, 1962	
Conserving Our Wildlife Today	Durward L. Allen	c-10m	November 1, 1968	
Construction Work: The Carpenter		c-14m	June 10, 1976	Video
Consumer Protection	David A. Smart (producer); Elvin S. Eyster	bw-10m	June 10, 1948	
Continents of the World	Howard G. Roepke	c-16m	January 9, 1969	
Control Your Emotions	David A. Smart (producer); Ted Peshak; consultant: A. R. Lauer	bw-13m	May 15, 1950	Video
Controlling the Collection Call	(Centron Corporation); Joel Marks (producer); Lillian Spina; production manager: Rachel Goodstein	c-16m	1985	Video
Controlling the Collector	(Centron Corporation); Joel Marks (producer); Lillian Spina; production manager: Rachel Goodstein	c-17m	1985	Telemarketing
Coronary Artery Disease		c-13m	1982	Cardiology: You & Your Heart
Cotton in Today's World	Zoe A. Thralls	c-11m	June 1, 1961	Video
Courtesy at School	Lawrence E. Vredevoe	c-11m	January 2, 1957	Video
Courtesy for Beginners	David A. Smart (producer); Ted Peshak; consultant: Marvin D. Glock	c-11m	September 11, 1952, revised 2nd version 1967	Video
The Cow and Its Relatives	Donald Hatfield & Eliot Williams	bw-11m	1941	
Cow and the Sprite	David A. Smart (producer)	bw-10m	October 31, 1949	Video
Crayfish: Life Cycle	Thomas Park	c-11m	July 10, 1964	
Creating with Color		c-11m	July 5, 1967	
Creating with Shapes	Jack Arends	c-11m	December 22, 1971	
Creating with Textures	Jack Arends	c-11m	March 29, 1972	Video
Creepy Crawlers: Legless Locomotion	Joel Marks (producer); Douglas L. Lieberman	c-11m	1987	
The Cricket and Grasshopper		c-11m	July 16, 1968	
Crime, Criminals and the System	(TRUST Inc.)	c-25m	1974	Justice
Crisis Manager	(Focus Enterprises Inc.) Joel Marks; cast: Thomas E. Cronin	c-12m	1990	Modern President
The Critical Edge	Joel Marks (producer); Cathy Hurwitz	c-23m	1990	
Critical Thinking: Making Sure of Facts (How to Judge Facts)	Robert S. Fox	c-11m	March 1, 1971	Video
Crowns and Bridges		c-9m	1982	Dentistry Today
Crystals and Their Growth	Paul M. Wright	c-12m	November 1, 1967	
Cuba: The Land and the People	David A. Smart (producer); A. Curtis Wilgus	c-11m	November 29, 1950	Video
Cuckoo Clock That Wouldn't Cuckoo		bw-11m	October 2, 1958	
The Curious Cougars	Bill Walker	c-10m	1982	
Current Events: Understanding and Evaluating Them	John Henry Haefner	c-10m	September 3, 1963	
Customer Services: A back-up Sales Force	(Centron Corporation)	c-14m	1983	Telemarketing
Cutting and Pasting		c-11m	October 1, 1963	
Czechoslovakia: The Land and the People	Norman J.G. Pounds	c-16m	October 1, 1969	

== D ==
Title	Major credits (mostly advisers prior to '70s)	Black & white or color (& running time)	Year / copyright date	Notes
The Dairy Farm	Virgil E. Herrick (1963 edition)	c-14m	1943, revised April 1, 1963	Video
Daniel Boone in America's Story	Lewis Eldon Atherton	c-16m	September 3, 1968	Video
Darwin and the Theory of Natural Selection	Robert I. Bowman	c-16m	May 17, 1967	
Data Processing: An Introduction	Peter D. Abrams	c-14m	March 6, 1972	Video
Date Etiquette	David A. Smart (producer)	bw-10m	April 7, 1952	Video
Dating: Dos and Don'ts	David A. Smart (producer); Ted Peshak; consultant: Reubin Hill	c-13m	November 2, 1949	Video
The Dating Scene	William M. Smith Jr.	c-16m	September 25, 1972	Video
David and Betsey Trotwood	Desmond Davis	bw-25m	October 1, 1959	
David and Dora	Desmond Davis	bw-25m	October 1, 1959	
David and Dora Married	Desmond Davis	bw-25m	October 1, 1959	
David and His Mother	Desmond Davis	bw-25m	October 1, 1959	
David and Mr. Micawber	Desmond Davis	bw-25m	October 1, 1959	
David Swan: A Fantasy	(Galen Films); Len Morris	c-23m	1977	
Dawn of the American Revolution: A Lexington Family	W. Linwood Chase	c-16m	October 14, 1964, revised 2nd version 1975	
A Day in the Life of a Child in Nicaragua		c-26m	1989	Day in the Life of a Child
A Day with English Children	David A. Smart (producer); I. Owem Foster	bw-10m	July 16, 1948	
Dealing with Customer Objections	(Centron Corporation); script: John Clifford	c-17m	1984	Telemarketing
Dealing with Customers	Dean R. Malsbary & Richard J. Zuromski	c-11m	June 17, 1976	Basic Job Skills
Dealing With Feelings		c-15m	1983	Healthwise
Death - Coping with Loss		c-19m	May 25, 1976	Video
Deciduous Forest		c-21m	1978	
Decimals Are Easy	David A. Smart (producer); H.C. Christofferson	c-11m	December 12, 1950	
Decline of the Roman Empire	T. Walter Wallbank	bw-13m	April 23, 1959	
The Deer and Its Relatives	Donald Hatfield & Eliot Williams	bw-11m	1941	
Democracy: The Role of Dissent	(New Document Productions)	c-13m	February 3, 1970	Video
Democracy: Your Voice Can Be Heard	(New Document Productions)	c-13m	February 3, 1970	
Dental Health: How and Why	David A. Smart (producer); Maury Massler	c-11m	October 31, 1949	Video
The Dentist and Your Health		c-11m	1982	Dentistry Today
The Dentist Office		c-13m	1982	Dentistry Today
Department Store Clerk	Daniel H. Kruger	c-10m	1975	My First Job
Describing an Incident	David A. Smart (producer); Dora V. Smith	bw-9m	June 14, 1949	Video
Desert Dwellers: Plants and Animals	(Arizona-Sonora Desert Museum); Herbert Ullman	c-22m	May 1, 1967	Video
Developing Friendships	David A. Smart (producer); Ted Peshak; consultant: Lemo D. Rockwood	c (bw surviving)-11m	May 25, 1950	Video
Developing Imagination	David A. Smart (producer); Henry Grattan	bw-11m	June 30, 1950	
Developing Leadership	David A. Smart (producer); Ted Peshak; consultant: William E. Young	bw-10m	February 10, 1949	Video
Developing Maturity: Taking Care Of Things	(Don Connors Productions); Bert L. Kaplan & Audrey Goodloe	c-10m	March 31, 1978	
Developing Reading Maturity: Comparative		bw-11m	November 2, 1964	
Developing Reading Maturity: Critical Evaluation		bw-11m	November 2, 1964	
Developing Reading Maturity: Interpreting Meaning		bw-11m	November 2, 1964	Video
Developing Reading Maturity: The Mature Reader		bw-11m	November 2, 1964	
Developing Responsibility	David A. Smart (producer); Ted Peshak; consultant: I. Owen Foster	bw-11m	May 20, 1949	Video
Developing Responsibility	Harold F. Cottingham	c-10m	October 1, 1970	Video
Developing Self Reliance	David A. Smart (producer); Ted Peshak; consultant: J. Paul Leonard	bw-10m	January 26, 1951	Video
Developing Reading Maturity: Understanding Style		bw-11m	November 2, 1964	Video
Developing Your Character	David A. Smart (producer)	bw-11m	October 27, 1950	Video
Development of the Chick Embryo	John Smart (producer); K. T. Rogers	bw-6m	July 21, 1953	
Developmental Biology	(BioMedia Associates); Carl P. Swanson	c-19m	1982	Biological Sciences; snippet video
Dictionaries, Words and Languages	Carl A. LeFevre	c-11m	July 2, 1973	
Dictionary for Beginners	LeRoy Barney	c-11m	1971	Video
Diffusion and Osmosis	Addison E. Lee	c-11m	June 1, 1964	Video
Digestion and Absorption	Bill Walker & Joel Marks (producer); Mel Waskin	c-10m	1987	Your Active Body
Digestion in Our Bodies	Raymond C. Ingraham	c-10m	March 1, 1961	
Digestive System	Bill Walker	c-16m	1980	Human Body
Digestive System (2nd edition)	Bill Walker & Joel Marks (producers); Douglas L. Lieberman; advisers: June B. Steinberg & Allan B. Sutow	c-16m	1993	Human Body; snippet video
Digging Into the Past: Archaeology	Stuart Struever & Genevieve R. MacDougall	c-14m	1976	Video
The Dinosaur Who Wondered Who He Was		c-13m	1976	
Directions	(Christianson Productions); Joel Marks (producer); David Christianson	c-10m	1987	Map Skills for Beginners For Beginners (part animation)
Directions for Beginners: North, South, East, West	James R. Wailes	c-11m	February 2, 1970	Video
Discovering Language - Varieties of English	Raven I. McDavid Jr.	c-10m	1972	Video
Discovering the Library	Mildred L Batchelder	c-10m	September 20, 1954, revised 2nd version 1975	Video
Discussion in Democracy	David A. Smart (producer); William G. Brink	bw-11m	December 14, 1948	Video
Disease and Its Control		c-11m	March 2, 1954	
Division Is Easy (Division for Beginners)	David A. Smart (producer); David Rappaport	c-11m	September 28, 1949	Video
Do Better at Your Examinations	David A. Smart (producer); Henry B. McDaniel	c-11m	January 23, 1951	Video
Do I Want to Be a Secretary?		c-10m	June 10, 1954	
Do Words Ever Fool You?	David A. Smart (producer); Viola Theman	bw-11m	March 16, 1948	Video
Does It Ever Rain in the Desert?	Bill Walker (producer); script: Mel Waskin	c-11m	1987	Wonder World of Science (part animated)
The Dolphin Kick	(Jorhal Pictures)	c-8m	July 18, 1956	Video
Don't Be SAD: Holly & Me	(Li'l Apple Productions); Joel Marks (producer); writer: Frank Ferraro	c-10m	1991	
Don't Be SAD: No Time To Be A Kid	(Li'l Apple Productions); Joel Marks (producer); writer: Frank Ferraro	c-10m	1991	
The Donkeys		c-11m	1974	
The Drug Dilemma: A New Day Dawning?		c-27m	February 23, 1972	
Drugs and Medicine: Help for a Friend	(Moreland-Latchford); Donald J. Wolk	c-10m	1975	
Drugs and Medicine: Using Them Safely	(Moreland-Latchford); Donald J. Wolk	c-10m	1975	
Drugs and Medicine: What Is Misuse?	(Moreland-Latchford); Donald J. Wolk	c-10m	1975	
Drugs and Medicine: What They Do	(Moreland-Latchford); Donald J. Wolk	c-10m	1975	
Drugs and Medicine: Where They Come From	(Moreland-Latchford); Donald J. Wolk	c-10m	1975	
Drugstore Clerk	Daniel H. Kruger	c-10m	1975	My First Job
Durango Daredevil Strikes Again!	Joseph Siracuse	c-12m	April 8, 1974	Forest Town Fable; Video

== E ==
Title	Major credits (mostly advisers prior to '70s)	Black & white or color (& running time)	Year / copyright date	Notes
E Is for Ecology	Ron & Sydney Crawford	c-11m	1979	
E Is for Energy	Ron & Sydney Crawford	c-11m	1979	Video
Early America Civilizations	Joel Marks & Mike Carlson (producer); Mel Waskin	c-24m	1988	
Early American Civilizations: Mayan, Aztec, Incan	I. James Quillen	c-13m	March 1, 1957	
Earning Money While Going to School	David A. Smart (producer)	bw-10m	February 3, 1950	Video
Ears: Their Structure and Care	E. W. Hagens & Frederic F. Stenn	bw-11m	February 1, 1963	Video
The Earth: Action of Rivers	Laurence H. Nobles	c-11m	January 5, 1970	
The Earth: Changes in Its Surface	Clark I. Cross	c-11m	June 1, 1960	
The Earth: Coastlines	Laurence H. Nobles	c-11m	January 5, 1970	Video
The Earth: Discovering Its History	Clark I. Cross	c-15m	March 25, 1976	
The Earth: Its Atmosphere	Ron Tyner & Mohan Sood	bw-11m	February 1, 1961	
The Earth: Its Magnetic Field	Charles E. Helsley	c-14m	November 12, 1969	Video
The Earth: Its Oceans	Richard H. Fleming	bw-11m	May 11, 1960	Video
The Earth: Its Structure	Clark I. Cross	c-11m	May 9, 1960	
The Earth: Its Water Cycle	Addison E. Lee	c-11m	March 18, 1974	
The Earth: Resources in Its Crust	Clark I. Cross	c-11m	May 11, 1960	Video
The Earth: Volcanoes	Laurence H. Nobles	c-11m	January 5, 1970	
The Earth's Atmosphere	(BioMedia Associates); Joel Marks (producer); Mel Waskin	c-14m	1985	Atmospheric Science; snippet video
The Earth's Movements	Henry J. Otto	c-10m	March 2, 1967	Video
Earthworm: Anatomy and Dissection	Thomas Park	c-11m	December 1, 1961	
The Earthworm: Darwin's Plow	adviser: Ruth L. Willey & Roger Costa	c-13m	1985	
Easter Season	David A. Smart (producer)	c-10m	February 1, 1952	
Eastern Europe: An Introduction	Norman J.G. Pounds	c-13m	October 1, 1963	
Eat Well, Grow Well!	Leslie W. Irwin	c-11m	September 3, 1965	
Echinoderms and Mollusks		c-16m	January 2, 1968	
Ecological Biology	(BioMedia Associates); Bruce J. Russell & J. David Denning	c-17m	1981	Biological Sciences; Video
Ecology: Communities	Joel Marks, David Williams & Emma Peddie (producers); Douglas L. Lieberman	c-14m	1992	
Ecology: Food Chains	Joel Marks, David Williams & Emma Peddie (producer); Douglas L. Lieberman	c-14m	1992	
Ecology: Nutrient Cycles	Joel Marks, David Williams & Emma Peddie (producer); Douglas L. Lieberman	c-14m	1992	
Ecology: Populations	Joel Marks, David Williams & Emma Peddie (producers); Douglas L. Lieberman	c-14m	1992	
Ecology: Succession	Joel Marks, David Williams & Emma Peddie (producer); Douglas L. Lieberman	c-14m	1992	
Edgar Allan Poe: Background for His Works	Walter Blair; revised by MikeCarlson	c-13m	September 2, 1958, revised 1979	Video
Education in America: The 17th and 18th Centuries	R. Freeman Butts	c-16m	April 15, 1958	Video
Education in America: The 19th Century	R. Freeman Butts	c-16m	April 9, 1958	
Education for Living: Vocational Opportunities		c-28m	1976	
Education in America: 20th Century Developments	R. Freeman Butts	c-16m	April 15, 1958	Video
Effective Criticism	David A. Smart (producer); Ted Peshak; consultant: E. de Alton Partridge	c-10m	April 23, 1951	Video
Effective Writing: Learning From Advertising Language	Solomon Siraonson	c-11m	March 18, 1971	
Effective Writing: The Paragraph Connection	John R. Searles	c-13m	September 16, 1976	
Effective Writing: Research Skills	John R. Searles	c-11m	October 11, 1972	
Effective Writing: Revise and Improve	John R. Searles	c-11m	March 1, 1971	
Effective Writing: Sentence Sense	John R. Searles	c-13m	September 16, 1976	
An Egg Becomes a Chick	Lawrence I. Gilbert & Sidney B. Simpson	c-12m	June 16, 1972	Video
El Valle De Las Palmas		c-12m	January 5, 1966	
Electric Currents and Circuits	(Centron Corporation)	c-14m	1985	The Physical Sciences; Video
Electricity	advisers: Fred F. Wins & Virginia Kaufman	c-14m	1990	Matter and Energy For Beginners (part animation)
Electricity All About Us	John G. Read	c-11m	June 4, 1958, revised 2nd version 1975	Exploring Science
Electricity and Magnetism	(Centron Corporation)	c-14m	1985	The Physical Sciences
Electricity for Beginners	Clifford G. McCollum	c-11m	December 18, 1963	Video
Electricity From Chemicals		c-15m	May 2, 1966	Video
Electricity: How It Is Generated	Sam Adams	c-11m	November 11, 1960	
Electricity: Principles of Safety	Sam Adams	c-11m	December 19, 1960	
Electrochemical Reactions	Lester I. Bockstahler	c-13m	January 2, 1963	
Electromagnetic Induction	Lester I. Bockstahler	c-13m	January 2, 1963	
Electromagnets and Their Uses	Sam Adams	c-11m	April 14, 1972	
Electrons and Electronics: An Introduction	John S. Richardson	c-11m	January 2, 1962	
Electrostatic Charges and Forces		bw-13m	January 2, 1963	
Elements, Compounds and Mixtures	(Don Lane Pictures); Roger Mazur (producer); script: Douglas L. Lieberman & Mel Waskin	c-20m	1983	Chemistry; Video
The Emperor's New Clothes		c-12m	1979	
The Enchanted River	(Films for Children)	c-9m	August 15, 1950	
Endocrine System	Bill Walker	c-16m	1980	Human Body; Video
Endocrine System (2nd edition)	Bill Walker & Joel Marks (producers); Douglas L. Lieberman; advisers: June B. Steinberg & Allan B. Sutow	c-16m	1993	Human Body; snippet video
Energy and Its Forms	John G. Read	c-11m	March 6, 1961	
Energy and Living Things	John Gabriel Navarra	c-13m	April 7, 1970	Nature of Life; Video
The Energy Balance	Bill Walker (producer)	c-15m	1986	Atmospheric Science
Energy Does Work	Glenn O. Blough	c-11m	March 1, 1961	Video
Energy in Our Rivers	David A. Smart (producer); Thomas F. Barton	c-10m	November 17, 1948	Video
Energy: A Light at the End of the Tunnel	Robert MacNeil	c-16m	1981	Video
Energy, the Ultimate Problem?	John P. Holdren & George Hultgren	c-10m	March 16, 1976	Video
Engines and How They Work	Robert Stollberg	c-11m	December 31, 1958	
England: Background of Literature	David A. Smart (producer); John J. De Boer	bw-10m	December 1, 1947	Video
English and Dutch Colonization of the New World	Robert A. Naslund	c-11m	May 8, 1956, revised 1980	Video
English History: Absolutism and Civil War	George L. Mosse	bw-12m	May 6, 1958	Video
English History: Earliest Times to 1066	John Smart (producer); George L. Mosse, I. James Quillen & Lacey Baldwin Smith	c-11m	January 11, 1954	Video
English History: Nineteenth Century Reforms	Lacey Baldwin Smith	bw-13m	1959	Video
English History: Norman Conquest to the 15th Century	John Smart (producer); George L. Mosse, I. James Quillen & Lacey Baldwin Smith	c-11m	January 11, 1954	
English History: Restoration and Glorious Revolution	George L. Mosse	bw-12m	May 6, 1958	
English History: Tudor Period	John Smart (producer); George L. Mosse, I. James Quillen & Lacey Baldwin Smith	c-11m	January 11, 1954	
English Influences in the United States	David A. Smart (producer)	bw-10m	June 26, 1950	Video
The English Language: How It Changes	Thomas H. Wetmore	bw-11m	September 3, 1964	
English Language: Story of Its Development	John Smart (producer)	bw-11m	December 19, 1952	Video
English Literature: Chaucer and the Medieval Period	Bartlett J. Whiting	c-13m	September 3, 1957	Video
English Literature: The Eighteenth Century	James L. Clifford	c-14m	January 2, 1958	
English Literature: The Elizabethan Period	Douglas Bush	c-13m	January 8, 1958	
English Literature: The Romantic Period	Bennett Weaver	c-13m	April 12, 1957	
English Literature: The Seventeenth Century	Douglas Bush	c-13m	June 2, 1958	
English Literature: The Victorian Period	Richard D. Altick	c-13m	April 5, 1957	
English on the Job: Its Spelling patterns	Glenn Holder	c-14m	April 17, 1972	
English on the Job: Listening and Speaking Skills	Glenn Holder	c-14m	March 7, 1972	Video
English on the Job: Reading Skills	Glenn Holder	c-14m	1971	Video
English on the Job: Writing Skills	Glenn Holder	c-14m	1971	Video
Enjoying the Seasons		c-series of 8mm loops	April 15, 1975	
Equations: Number Sentences		c-11m	October 1, 1965	
The European Economic Community	James D. Calderwood	c-11m	November 1, 1965	
Everyday Courage and Common Sense	Joseph L. Norton	c-11m	September 3, 1968	
Everyday Courtesy	David A. Smart (producer); William E. Young	bw-9m	May 4, 1948	Video
Everyday Courtesy (2nd edition)	William E. Young	c-11m	1967	Video
Evolution of Man	William V. Mayer	c-14m	July 7, 1967	
Evolutionary Biology	(BioMedia Associates); Bruce J. Russell & J. David Denning	c-15m	1981	Biological Sciences; snippet video
Excretory System	Bill Walker	c-13m	1980	Human Body
Excretory System (2nd edition)	Bill Walker & Joel Marks (producers); Douglas L. Lieberman; advisers: June B. Steinberg & Allan B. Sutow	c-16m	1993	Human Body
Exercise and Health	David A. Smart (producer); Ted Peshak; consultant: Erwn F. Bayer	c-10m	March 9, 1949	Video
Exercise and Your Healthy Heart		c-14m	1982	Cardiology: You & Your Heart
Exploring the Atomic Nucleus	(Argonne National Laboratory)	c-14m	September 26, 1967	Video
Exploring Space: Beyond Our Solar System	Franklyn M. Branley & Samuel A. Dell'Aria	c-13m	September 13, 1977	
Exploring Space: How Astronomers Study the Universe	Franklyn M. Branley & Samuel A. Dell'Aria	c-13m	September 13, 1977	
Exploring Space: The Moon and How It Affects Us	Franklyn M. Branley & Samuel A. Dell'Aria	c-18m	September 13, 1977	
Exploring Space: The Solar System	Franklyn M. Branley & Samuel A. Dell'Aria	c-19m	September 13, 1977	
Exploring Space: The Solar System (2nd edition)	(Martin & Rosenthal Educational)	c-24m	1997	
Exploring Space: The Sun and Its Energy	Franklyn M. Branley & Samuel A. Dell'Aria	c-10m	September 13, 1977	Video
Eye: An Inside Story	adviser: Irving F. Miller	c-10m	July 31, 1978	
Eyes: Their Structure and Care		c-11m	September 1, 1956	Video

== F ==
Title	Major credits (mostly advisers prior to '70s)	Black & white or color (& running time)	Year / copyright date	Notes
Fairness for Beginners (The Fairness Game)	Marvin D. Glock	c-10m	November 8, 1956, revised 2nd version 1974	Video (1956 version)
Families Are Different and Alike		c-14m	January 4, 1971	
Families: Growing and Changing		c-15m	1983	Healthwise
A Family Guide to Diabetes		c-12m	1985	
Family Life	David A. Smart (producer); Ted Peshak; consultant: Florence M. King	c-11m	January 31, 1949	Video (BW version)
Farm Animals in Rhyme	Helen Heffernan	c-11m	June 12, 1968	
Farm Village of India: The Struggle with Tradition	Dept. of Agricultural and Resource Economics, University of Maryland; Phillips Foster (producer)	c-21m	1969	Video
Farms Around the World		c-11m	October 1, 1970	Video
Farmyard Babies (Farm Babies and Their Mothers)	John Smart (producer)	c-11m	December 1, 1952, revised 2nd version 1978	
Fast and Slow	Willard Abraham	c-10m	January 2, 1977	
Fear, Crime and Prevention	(TRUST Inc.)	c-25m	1974	Justice
The Federal Government: The Plan of Organization	David A. Smart (producer); Harry W. Porter	c-14m	February 22, 1951	
Federal Taxation	David A. Smart (producer); William J. Schultz	bw-10m	May 17, 1948, revised 2nd edition 1965	Video
Feeling Left Out? (Social Adjustment)	David A. Smart (producer); Ted Peshak; consultant: Paul H. Landis	c-13m	November 29, 1951	Video
Feiz the Last Expert	(Perspective Films); Milan Chupurdija	c-15m	1974	Video
Filing Procedures in Business	David A. Smart (producer); David G. Goodman	c-11m	January 20, 1950, revised 2nd edition 1965	
Film Highlights of Modern History: The Early 1900s		bw-32m	July 17, 1967	
Find the Information	David A. Smart (producer); John J. DeBoer	c-11m	June 11, 1948	
Finding the Right Job	David A. Smart (producer); Ted Peshak; consultant: John N. Given	bw-11m	April 4, 1949	
Finger Painting Methods	(Golden Gate Kindergarten Association); Rhoda Kellogg	c-9m	July 10, 1953	
Fire and Oxidation		bw-11m	January 2, 1964	
Fire Exit Drill at Our School	John Smart (producer); Francis Scherr	bw-11m	September 4, 1953	Video
First Aid: Fundamentals	John Smart (producer); Earl H. Breon	bw-11m	June 5, 1953	
The First Christmas Tree	Tod Stromquist	c-11m	September 7, 1971	
Fish and Their Characteristics		c-11m	June 8, 1961	Video
Fisherman's Boy	Ruth G. Strickland	c-11m	June 30, 1955	Video
Fitness Fun		c-15m	1983	Healthwise
Five Colorful Birds	John Smart (producer); Olin Sewall Pettingill Jr.	c-10m	1944, revised January 12, 1954	
Flipper, the Seal	John Smart (producer); script: Thomas Riha	c-11m	January 19, 1953	Background for Reading & Expression; Video
Flowers: Structure and Function	Charles B. Heiser Jr.	c-11m	September 1, 1964	Video
Fluffy, the Ostrich	Thom Lafferty & Johnny V. Cox	bw-10m	July 6, 1956	Background for Reading & Expression
Flute, Clarinet and Bassoon	(Gateway Educational Films)	c-12m	June 2, 1963	
Folk Songs of America's History	Hazel Gertrude Kinscella	c-14m	January 4, 1960	
Folk Songs of the Western Movement, 1787-1853	George List	c-14m	October 3, 1968	
Folk Songs of the Western Settlement, 1865-1900	George List	c-16m	September 26, 1968	
Following Instructions	Dean R. Malsbary & Richard J. Zuromski	c-11m	1976	Basic Job Skills
Food Chooser's Guide to the Well-fed Cell	Kier M. Cline	c-22m	1982	Part animation
The Food Cycle and Food Chains	Mark A. Graubard	c-11m	May 1, 1963	Video
Food Services	Daniel H. Kruger	c-10m	1975	My First Job
Food That Builds Good Health	Clifford J. Barborka	c-11m	April 3, 1967	Video
Foods Around the World		c-11m	October 3, 1966	Video
Foods From Grains		c-11m	July 2, 1962	
Football Fundamentals: Blocking and Tackling	Bob Voigts & Kenneth Leon Wilson	c-11m	March 24, 1954	
Force and Motion	David A. Smart (producer); Ira M. Freeman	c-11m	November 9, 1949	
Forces: Composition and Resolution	Charles H. Bachman	c-10m	June 1, 1962	
Forests and Conservation	J. E. Hansen & Freeman Brown	c-11m	1946	
Forms of Music: Instrumental	John M. Kuypers	c-17m	January 3, 1961	
Fossils: Clues to Prehistoric Times (Prehistoric Times)	George G. Mallinson	c-11m	April 9, 1957, revised 2nd version 1976	
Fossils: From Site to Museum	Eugene S. Richardson	c-11m	May 3, 1971	
Fractions: Finding the Common Denominator	Foster E. Grossnickle	c-13m	March 1, 1961	Video
France: Background for Literature	David A. Smart (producer)	bw-11m	March 27, 1950	Video
Francesco the Potter: Greece	(Sunrise Films of Toronto)	c-24m	1978	World Cultures & Youth (Canada: Spread Your Wings); also known as Francesco's Gift
Fred and Billy Take an Airplane Trip	David A. Smart (producer); George B. Smith	c-10m	August 31, 1951	
Fred Meets a Bank	David A. Smart (producer); I. Owen Foster & Frederick G. Neel	c-12m	January 16, 1947	
French and Indian War	Howard Peckham & John Irwin Cooper; revised by Mike Carlson	c-11m	February 3, 1959, revised 2nd edition 1981	Video (1981 version)
French Exploration(s) in the New World	Robert A. Naslund, revised by Mike Carlson	c-11m	May 8, 1956, revised 2nd edition 1988	Video
French Influences in North America	David A. Smart (producer)	c-11m	April 23, 1951	Video
French Revolution	Leo Gershoy; revised by Mike Carlson	c-17m	May 14, 1957, revised 2nd edition 1979	Video (1979 version)
Friction and Its Effects	Clifford G. McCollum	c-11m	November 9, 1960	
Friendship Begins at Home	David A. Smart (producer)	bw-15m	September 14, 1949	Video
Frisky, the Calf	David A. Smart (producer)	c-11m	January 10, 1950	Video
The Frog Princess	Paul N. Peroff	c-7m-(F	January 2, 1958	
Frog's Life	(Plymouth Productions-Brandon Films)	bw-10m	November 17, 1955	
Fruit Flies, an Inquiry Into Behavior		c-12m	June 23, 1972	Video
Full Circle: The Work Of Doris Chase	(Perspective Films) Elizabeth Wood	c-10m	1974	
Fun of Being Thoughtful	David A. Smart (producer)	bw-10m	June 27, 1950	Video
Fun of Making Friends	David A. Smart (producer); Ted Peshak; consultant: Elizabeth B. Carey	c (bw surviving)-11m	September 25, 1950	Video
Fun of Making Friends (2nd Edition)	James L. Hymes Jr.	c-10m	1975	Video
Fun That Builds Good Health	David A. Smart (producer); Erwin F. Beyer	c-11m	April 14, 1950	Video
Fun with Speech Sounds (Fun with Speech Patterns)	George L. Lewis	c-10m	July 2, 1954, revised 2nd version 1973	Video (1954 version)
Fun with Words: From Sentences to Paragraphs	Harold G. Shane	c-11m	September 25, 1970	Video
Fun with Words: From Words to Sentences	Harold G. Shane	c-11m	June 1, 1970	
Fun with Words: The Word Hunt	Harold G. Shane	c-13m	December 13, 1974	
Fun with Words: Word Twins	Paul C. Berg	c-11m	July 1, 1969	Video
Fun with Words: Words That Add Meaning	Paul C. Berg	c-11m	July 1, 1969	
Fun with Words: Words That Describe Sounds	Harold G. Shane	c-11m	May 14, 1973	
Fun with Words: Words That Name and Do	Paul C. Berg	c-11m	July 1, 1969	Video
Fun with Words: Words That Rhyme	Harold G Shane	c-10m	1978	
Fundamentals of Public Speaking	David A. Smart (producer); William E. Utterback	c-11m	November 28, 1950, revised 2nd version 1969	Video (BW version)

== G ==
Title	Major credits (mostly advisers prior to '70s)	Black & white or color (& running time)	Year / copyright date	Notes
The Galapagos: Darwin's Clues	Robert I. Bowman	c-13m	July 16, 1973	
Galileo		c-13m	September 3, 1959	
Garden Plants and How They Grow	John Smart (producer); Helen J. Challand	c-11m	December 10, 1953	Exploring Science
Genetic Biology	Bruce Wallace	c-16m	1982	Biological Sciences
Genetics: Chromosomes and Genes (Meiosis)	William K. Baker	c-16m	May 1, 1968	
Genetics: Functions of DNA and RNA	William K. Baker	c-13m	May 7, 1968	
Genetics: Human Heredity	William K. Baker	c-14m	May 1, 1968	
Genetics: Improving Plants and Animals	William K. Baker	c-14m	February 1, 1962	
Genetics: Mendel's Laws	William K. Baker	c-14m	May 1, 1962	
Geography of Alaska and Hawaii	Thomas Frank Barton	c-16m	February 2, 1970	
Geography of the Middle Atlantic States	John Smart (producer); Thomas F. Barton	c-11m	June 15, 1953	Video
Geography of New England	David A. Smart (producer); Thomas Frank Barton	c-11m	February 19, 1951	
Geography of the North Central States	John H. Garland	c-10m	February 22, 1956	Video
Geography of the Pacific States (Living in the Pacific States)	John H. Garland	c-10m	March 16, 1956, revised 2nd version 1971	Video
Geography of the Rocky Mountain States	David A. Smart (producer); Earl B. Shaw	bw-11m	April 3, 1952	
Geography of South America	William J. Ketter	c-11m	September 26, 1977	
Geography of South America: Argentina & Uruguay	William J. Ketteringham	c-11m	February 1, 1961, revised 2nd version 1977	
Geography of South America: Brazil	Reynold E. Carlson	c-14m	March 21, 1961, revised 2nd version 1977	Video (1961 version) Video (1977 version)
Geography of South America: The Continent	Reynold E. Carlson	c-15m	May 3, 1961	Video
Geography of South America: Countries of the Andes	Frank Leuer Keller	c-11m	March 21, 1961, revised 2nd version 1977	
Geography of South America: Five Northern Countries	Donald D. Brand	c-11m	April 1, 1959, revised 2nd version 1977	Video
Geography of the Southern States	David A. Smart (producer); Earl B. Shaw	bw-11m	July 23, 1952	Video
Geography of the United States	Earl B. Shaw	c-15m	October 29, 1958	
Geography of Your Community	Zoe A. Thralls	c-11m	May 12, 1954	Video
Geometric Forms in Nature		c-12m	1977	
Geometry and You	David A. Smart (producer); Harold P. Fawcett	bw-11m	September 24, 1948	Video
Geometry: Inductive and Deductive Reasoning	Carl B. Boyer	c-13m	December 3, 1962	
George Washington's Little History of the United States	Ron & Sydney Crawford	c-10m	1980	
George's New Suit: Where Clothing Comes From	Janet Catherine Rees	c-11m	January 14, 1955	Video
Germany: Feudal States to Unification	T. Walter Wallbank	c-13m	June 10, 1959	
Germs and What They Do		c-8m	September 1, 1966	
Germs and Your Body	Warren H. Southworth	c-10m	August 14, 1974	
Get That Job!: Changing Jobs	Milton E. Larson & Robert T. Boddy	c-11m	July 7, 1975	
Get That Job!: Choosing a Career	Milton E. Larson & Robert T. Boddy	c-11m	August 3, 1975	
Get That Job!: Finding Leads	Milton E. Larson & Robert T. Boddy	c-11m	May 22, 1975	
Get That Job!: Handling the Interview	Milton E. Larson & Robert T. Boddy	c-11m	June 6, 1975	
Get That Job!: Keeping Up with the Changing World	Milton E. Larson & Robert T. Boddy	c-11m	July 28, 1975	Video
Get That Job!: Line Up Your Interview	Milton E. Larson & Robert T. Boddy	c-11m	June 3, 1975	
Getting Along with Others	Lawrence E. Vredevoe	c-10m	October 1, 1965	Video
Getting the Big Ideas	Theodore L. Harris	c-14m	June 26, 1968	Reading Growth
Getting Ideas to Write About	(Centron Corporation); adviser: John R. Searles	c-10m	1983	Effective Writing
Getting Into College	Joe Jefferson	c-13m	September 4, 1962	Video
Getting the Most Out of Your Team	Joel Marks (producer); Kathy Dale McNair	c-21m	1992	Straight Talk on Teams
Getting the Order	(Centron Corporation); Joel Marks (producer); Lillian Spina; production manager: Rachel Goodstein	c-17m	1984	Telemarketing
Getting Ready Emotionally	David A. Smart (producer)	bw-10m	December 3, 1951	Are You Ready for the Service?; Video
Getting Ready Morally	David A. Smart (producer)	bw-10m	December 3, 1951	Are You Ready for the Service?; Video
Getting Ready Physically	David A. Smart (producer)	bw-10m	December 3, 1951	Are You Ready for the Service?; Video
Gilberto's Mayan Dream: Guatemala	(Sunrise Films of Toronto); Deepa & Paul Saltzman, Fred Harris (producer); Roger Pyke	c-24m	1980	World Cultures & Youth (Canada: Spread Your Wings)
Gilly the Salamander	Leonard Kaplan & Mary Sue Kerner	c-16m	September 14, 1976	
Girl of the Navajos	writer: Mary Perrine	c-15m	1977	Snippet video
Glaciers	Charles Shabica & Ron Tyner	bw-10m	July 17, 1952, revised 2nd version 1977	Understanding Our Earth
Global Concept in Maps	David A. Smart (producer); Erwin Raisz	c-11m	August 11, 1947, revised 2nd version 1975	
The Global Energy Game		c-35m	1978	Video
Global Forecasting	Bill Walker (producer)	c-14m	1986	Atmospheric Science
Global Winds	Bill Walker (producer)	c-12m	1985	Atmospheric Science; Video
The Globe and Our Round Earth	Harold D Drummond	c-11m	March 24, 1967	
Globes	(Christianson Productions); Joel Marks (producer); David Christianson	c-10m	1987	Map Skills for Beginners For Beginners (part animation); Video
Goats		c-12m	1974	
Going Steady?	David A. Smart (producer); Ted Peshak; consultant: Judson T. Landis	c-10m	January 5, 1951	Video
Gold Rush Days		c-14m	April 9, 1958	Video
The Golden Deer		c-11m	December 30, 1974	Part animation
Golden Rule: A Lesson for Beginners	John Smart (producer); A. M. Johnston	c-10m	March 17, 1953	Video
Goldilocks and the Three Bears	John Smart (producer)	c-11m	November 2, 1953	Video
Good Eatin'		c-15m	1981	Healthwise
Good Eating Habits	David A. Smart (producer); Ted Peshak; consultant: Clifford J. Barborka	c-10m	May 22, 1951	Video (BW version)
Good Eating Habits (2nd edition)	Richard K. Means	c-10m	March 15, 1973	
Good Grooming for Girls	Elizabeth S Avery	c-11m	January 5, 1956	
Good Sportsmanship (Beginning Responsibility: Being a Good Sport)	David A. Smart (producer); Ted Peshak; consultant: Karl Bookwalter	bw-10m	April 7, 1950	Video
Good Table Manners	David A. Smart (producer); Ted Peshak	bw-11m	May 23, 1951	Video
Gopal's Golden Pendant: India	(Sunrise Films of Toronto); Paul Saltzman (producer)	c-24m	1978	World Cultures & Youth (Canada: Spread Your Wings)
Grammar: Verbs and How We Use Them	J. N. Hook	c-11m	October 3, 1957	
Graphing Linear Equations	Halbert C. Christofferson	c-11m	November 9, 1961	Video
Graphs: Understanding and Using Them	J. Houston Banks	c-11m	February 1, 1967	
The Grasshopper: A Typical Insect	Orlando Park & Lawrence I. Gilbert	c-6m	February 4, 1955, revised 2nd version 1965	Video
Gravity	David A. Smart (producer)	c-11m	January 30, 1950	Video
Gravity and What It Does	Nelson F Beeler	c-11m	July 15, 1966	
The Great American Student	Bill Walker (producer); Mel Waskin; editor: Bob Gronowski	c-18m	1978, revised 1985	
The Great Blue Heron	H. Michael Stewart	c-13m	November 22, 1976	Video
The Great Piggybank Raid	Joseph Siracuse	c-12m	April 19, 1974	Forest Town Fable
The Great Plains	Henry J. Warman	c-14m	October 2, 1967	North American Regions
Greece: The Land and the People	Norman J.G. Pounds	c-11m	March 2, 1959	
Greece: The Land and the People (Update)	William R Klein	c-11m	1977	
Greedy Hank's Big Pocket		c-8m	July 1, 1970	Video
Greenland: Stone Age to Jet Age		c-16m	July 5, 1972	Video
Grouping Things in Science	Clifford G McCollum	c-16m	September 3, 1969	Video
Growing and Learning	c-15m	1983	Healthwise	
Growing Up in the Great Depression		c-28m	1987	Snippet video
Growing Up: Preadolescence	Dale Benner Harris	c-11m	July 3, 1958	
Growth in the Desert: Living in the Southwestern States		c-14m	August 22, 1971	Video
Growth of Big Business in America, 1865-1900	Eric E. Lampard	c-10m	October 26, 1967	
Growth of Farming in America, 1865-1900	Eric E. Lampard	c-14m	November 27, 1967	Video
Growth of Flowers	David A. Smart (producer); John Ott Jr.	c-10m	December 27, 1945	
Growth of Flowers (2rd edition)		c-11m	1984	Video
Growth of Flowers (3rd edition)		c-11m	1987	
Growth of Flowers: New Edition		c-10m	March 12, 1959	
The Gruesome Gray Monster		c-9m	1976	

== H ==
Title	Major credits (mostly advisers prior to '70s)	Black & white or color (& running time)	Year / copyright date	Notes
Haiku: An Introduction to Poetry	Ruth Kearney Carlson	c-11m	March 19, 1970	
Halloween Safety	(Centron Corporation co-production); adviser: W. Roland Olin	c-14m	1985	Updated version of original 1977 film produced by Centron Corporation; Video
The Halogens	David A. Smart (producer); Therald Moeller	c-11m	July 7, 1947	
Hand Industries of Mexico	David A. Smart (producer); P. R. Hershey	c-10m	October 17, 1945	
Handel and His Music	Hazel Gertrude Kinscella	c-14m	October 1, 1957	Famous Composers; Video
Handling Daily Problems	Dean R. Malsbary & Richard J. Zuromski	c-11m	1976	Basic Job Skills
Handling Responsibility	Dean R. Malsbary & Richard J. Zuromski	c-11m	1976	Basic Job Skills; Video
Handwriting for Beginners: Manuscript	Wayne Otto	c-14m	May 16, 1968	
Happy Birthday USA	Charles B. Myers & Elizabeth M. Pollock	c-11m	September 23, 1975	Video
Harmony in Music	Gaby Dure Smart (producer); Traugott Rohner	c-11m	October 28, 1952	Video
Hasan the Carpetweaver: India	(Sunrise Films of Toronto); Paul Saltzman	c-24m	1976	World Cultures & Youth (Canada: Spread Your Wings)
Health Heroes: The Battle Against Disease		bw-11m	June 5, 1959	Video
Healthy Feet		c-11m	May 5, 1958	
Healthy Lungs	David A. Smart (producer)	bw-11m	June 18, 1951	
Healthy Skin		c-11m	May 1, 1958	
Hear Better, Healthy Ears	David A. Smart (producer); George E. Shambaugh	c-11m	December 26, 1950, revised 2nd version 1975	Video
Heart and Circulation	Bill Walker & Joel Marks (producer); Mel Waskin	c-10m	1988	Your Active Body
Heart Attack		c-14m	1983	Cardiology: You & Your Heart
Heart Failure and Your Heart As a Pump		c-14m	1979	Cardiology: You & Your Heart
The Heart: An Inside Story		c-11m	September 8, 1977 (completed '76)	
Heart, Lungs and Circulation	Leslie W. Irwin	c-11m	September 1, 1959	Video
Heart Murmurs		c-14m	1982	Cardiology: You & Your Heart
Hearts and Circulatory Systems	Raymond C. Ingraham	c-13m	February 3, 1969	
Heat and Energy Transfer	(Centron Corporation); Douglas L. Liebman; adviser: John Davik	c-14m	1985	The Physical Sciences; Video
Heat and Its Behavior	Nathan S. Washton	c-13m	November 9, 1960	
Heat and Temperature	Robert Karplus	c-13m	February 3, 1969	Video
Heat for Beginners	Clifford G. McCollum	c-11m	November 2, 1970	Video
Heat, Temperature and the Properties of Matter	(Centron Corporation)	c-17m	1985	The Physical Sciences
Heavy and Light	Willard Abraham	c-13m	December 20, 1974	
Hello, Hospital		c-15m	1983	Healthwise
Helpers at Our School	James L. Hymes Jr.	c-11m	December 1, 1965	
Helpers in Our Community		c-10m	December 4, 1958	
Helpers Who Come to Our House	Johnny V. Cox	c-10m	June 30, 1955	
The Helpful Little Fireman		c-11m	February 10, 1966	Video
The Helpful Little Mail Man		c-14m	1974	
Helping in the Care of Younger Children	John Smart (producer)	c-11m	December 4, 1953	
Heredity and Environment	David A. Smart (producer); A.R. Lauer	c-11m	June 22, 1951	Video
High: Drugs and You	(Moreland Latchford Productions); Donald J. Wolk; consultants: Robert R. Robinson & Fred Rosengarden	c-10m	1970	
High Jump	David A. Smart (producer); Dean B. Cromwell	bw-10m	December 14, 1945	
High School Prom		c-11m	January 15, 1958	
High School: Your Challenge	David A. Smart (producer)	bw-11m	March 4, 1952	Video
Hindu World	Robert M. Perry	c-11m	December 19, 1963	
Historic Lands: Living in the Southern States		c-15m	October 11, 1974	Video
History in Your Community	Donald Dean Parker	c-13m	January 20, 1955	
The History of Living Things	Rainer Zangerl	c-14m	April 3, 1967	
Holding Them Spellbound	(Centron Corporation); adviser: John R. Searles	c-11m	1983	Effective Writing
Holidays Your Neighbors Celebrate	Frank J. Estvan	c-11m	January 4, 1971	Video
The Holy Land: Background for History and Religion	Robert M. Perry	c-11m	September 14, 1954	
The Holy Roman Empire	George L. Mosse	c-15m	December 1, 1961	Video
Home Nursing: Fundamentals	John Smart (producer); Ann Magnussen	c-10m	June 17, 1953	Video
Homes Around the World	Frank E. Sorenson	c-11m	June 3, 1963	
Homework: Studying on Your Own	John Smart (producer); Harry W. Porter	c-10m	June 18, 1953	Video
Honest Woodsman	David A. Smart (producer)	bw-11m	November 10, 1949	Video
Honeybee: A Social Insect	Orlando Park	c-6m	February 15, 1955	
Honeybee: A Social Insect	Michael J. Wade & Mary R. Changnon	c-9m	1977	Video
Hong Kong: Wandering with Rick		c-10m	January 15, 1974	Video
Hopi Indian	David A. Smart (producer); Alfred Whiting	c-10m	June 20, 1945	Office of Indian Affairs; Video
The Hopi Indian (2nd edition)		c-10m	May 12, 1975	Video
Hopi Indian Arts and Crafts (Hopi Indian Village Life)	David A. Smart (producer)	c-10m	March 5, 1946	Office of Indian Affairs; Video
Hoppy the Bunny	John Smart (producer)	c-11m	January 21, 1953	Background for Reading & Expression; Video
The Horse and Its Relatives	Donald Hatfield, Eliot Williams & Frances Pressler	bw-11m	1942	
The Horses of Appleby Fair		c-11m	1982	
Hot and Cold	Willard Abraham	c-10m	February 15, 1973	Video
The Housefly and Its Control	D. F. Miller	c-11m	January 2, 1962	
How Air Helps Us	Verne N. Rockcastle	c-11m	June 3, 1963	
How the Animals Discovered Christmas		c-13m	September 26, 1956, revised 1983	Video
How Animals Get Ready For (The) Winter	Tessa Board (producer); Douglas L. Lieberman	c-11m	1991	Ecology For Beginners
How Animals Help Us	Helen Heffernan	c-11m	May 3, 1954	Observing Things Around Us; Video
How Animals Live in Winter		c-11m	December 22, 1955	
How Animals Live Through the Winter	Tessa Board (producer); Douglas L. Lieberman	c-11m	1991	Ecology For Beginners
How Big Were the Dinosaurs?	Bill Walker (producer); script: Mel Waskin	c-11m	1986	Wonder World of Science (part animated)
How Billy Keeps Clean (Billy the Clean)	David A. Smart (producer)	bw-10m	November 28, 1951, revised 2nd version 1975	Video
How Birds Help Us	E. DeAlton Partridge	c-11m	April 3, 1957	
How Do You Know It's Love?	David A. Smart (producer); Ted Peshak; consultant: Reuben Hill	c-12m	December 28, 1950	Video (BW print)
How Effective Is Your Reading?	David A. Smart (producer); Ruth Strang	c-11m	June 22, 1951	Video
How Flowers Make Seeds	John Myron Atkin	c-10m	September 3, 1963	Video
How Friendly Are You?	David A. Smart (producer); Ted Peshak; consultant: Hark R. Douglass	bw-10m	February 21, 1951	Video
How Good Are Rocks?	Bill Walker (producer); script: Mel Waskin	c-12m	1986	Wonder World of Science (part animated)
How Green Plants Make and Use Food	Raymond Elwood Girton	c-11m	February 7, 1958, revised 1984	Video
How Honest Are You?	David A. Smart (producer); Ted Peshak; consultant: Elizabeth B. Carey	bw-13m	October 19, 1950	Video
How Insects Help Us	E. DeAlton Partridge	bw-10m	April 1, 1957	
How Its Surface Changes		bw-10m	November 1, 1956	Understanding Our Earth
How Jobs Change	Donald G. Mortensen	c-14m	March 22, 1976	People at Work
How Levers Help Us	Clarence R. Trexler	c-11m	November 2, 1970	Video
How Light Helps Us	Ernest E. Snyder	c-10m	March 28, 1973	
How Living Things Change	J. Darrell Barnard	c-11m	September 3, 1957	
How Machines and Tools Help Us	Helen Heffernan	c-10m	October 22, 1954	Video
How Man Made Day (Story of Illumination)	David A. Smart (producer); Ilia Podendorf	c-11m	July 26, 1946	Video
How Many Days To America? A Thanksgiving Day Story	Sharon Hoogstraten (producer); narrator: Roberto Sapier	c-10m	1990	Animated cartoon; Video
How Material Changes	Advisers: Fred F. Wins & Virginia Kaufman	c-14m	1990	Matter and Energy For Beginners (part animation)
How Materials Are Alike and Different		c-11m	October 14, 1964	
How Nations Work Together	Frank E. Sorenson	c-14m	July 15, 1971	Video
How People Choose Jobs	Donald G. Mortensen	c-14m	March 22, 1976	People at Work
How Plants Help Us	Helen Heffernan	bw-10m	May 12, 1954	Observing Things Around Us; Video
How Power Drives Machines	Nathan S. Washton	c-11m	September 3, 1963	Video
How Quiet Helps at School	John Smart (producer)	bw-11m	July 29, 1953	Video
How Ramps Help Us	Clarence R. Trexler	c-11m	November 2, 1970	
How Simple Machines Make Work Easier		bw-11m	February 3, 1964	Video
How Sound Helps Us		c-11m	November 10, 1964	
How Sunshine Helps Us		c-11m	February 1, 1961	Video
How to Be Well Groomed	David A. Smart (producer); Mary E. Weathersby	bw-11m	November 17, 1948	Video
How to Concentrate	David A. Smart (producer); I. James Quillen	c-11m	June 27, 1951	
How to Develop Interest	David A. Smart (producer)	bw-11m	May 12, 1950	Video
How to Find the Answer	David A. Smart (producer)	bw-11m	December 9, 1949	Video
How to Get Cooperation	David A. Smart (producer)	bw-11m	August 29, 1950	Video
How to Give and Take Instructions	David A. Smart (producer)	bw-11m	May 18, 1951	Video
How to Judge Authorities	David A. Smart (producer); William G. Brink	c-10m	April 28, 1948	Video
How to Judge Facts	David A. Smart (producer); William G. Brink	bw-10m	May 4, 1948	Video
How to Keep a Job	David A. Smart (producer); Ted Peshak; consultant: John N. Given	c-10m	August 11, 1949	Video
How to Observe	David A. Smart (producer)	bw-11m	January 26, 1950	
How to Prepare a Class Report	John Smart (producer)	bw-11m	February 12, 1953	Video
How to Read a Book	David A. Smart (producer); William G. Brink	c-10m	March 10, 1947	
How to Read a Book	(Centron Corporation) Mel Waskin	c-14m	1984	Video
How to Read Newspapers	Roland E. Wolseley	c-14m	October 22, 1951, revised 2nd version 1970	Video
How to Remember	David A. Smart (producer)	bw-11m	June 5, 1950	Video
How to Say No: Moral Maturity	David A. Smart (producer)	bw-10m	October 29, 1951	Video
How to Study	William G. Brink	c-10m	June 27, 1946	Video (BW version)
How to Study (2nd edition)	William G. Brink	c-10m	1961	Video
How to Think	David A. Smart (producer)	bw-14m	February 20, 1950	
How to Write Effectively	David A. Smart (producer)	bw-11m	June 5, 1950	Video
How to Write Your Term Paper	David A. Smart (producer); William G. Brink	bw-11m	June 1, 1948	Video
How Trees Help Us	E. DeAlton Partridge	c-10m	March 1, 1957	
How Water Helps Us		bw-10m	May 2, 1957	Video
How We Cooperate	David A. Smart (producer)	bw-10m	February 7, 1950	
How We Elect Our Representatives	David A. Smart (producer); Jerome G. Kerwin	c-10m	January 10, 1947, 2nd edition 1963, revised 1972	Video (1947 version) Video (1963 version) Video (1972 version)
How We Learn	David A. Smart (producer); Ted Peshak; consultant: E. De Alton Partridge	c-11m	August 7, 1951	Video
How Weather Is Forecast	John Smart (producer)	c-10m	December 4, 1953	
How Wedges Help Us	Clarence R. Trexler	c-11m	December 4, 1970	
How Wheels Help Us	Verne N. Rockcastle	c-11m	June 1, 1966	Video
The Human Body: The Brain	J. Langdon Taylor	c-16m	January 22, 1968	Video
The Human Body: Chemistry of Digestion	John S. Gray	c-16m	March 18, 1969	
The Human Body: Circulatory System	George K. Fenn	c-14m	October 10, 1956	Video
The Human Body: Digestive System	John S. Gray	c-14m	February 7, 1958	Video
The Human Body: Excretory System		c-13m	June 6, 1960	
The Human Body: Muscular System	Raymond C. Ingraham	c-14m	February 1, 1962	Video
The Human Body: Nervous System	Jean Spencer Felton	c-14m	December 11, 1958	Video
The Human Body: Nutrition and Metabolism	John S. Gray	c-14m	April 2, 1962	Video
The Human Body: Reproductive System	John S. Gray	c-14m	April 14, 1959	Video
The Human Body: Respiratory System	John S. Gray	c-14m	April 22, 1961	
The Human Body: Sense Organs	Raymond C Ingraham	c-16m	October 1, 1965	Video
The Human Body: Systems Working Together		c-15m	1980	Video
The Human Body: Skeleton	John Smart (producer); B. J. Anson	c-10m	June 15, 1953	Video
Hydrogen	Frederic B. Dutton	c-14m	May 28, 1959	

== I ==
Title	Major credits (mostly advisers prior to '70s)	Black & white or color (& running time)	Year / copyright date	Notes
I Never Catch A Cold		c-10m	1945	Video
I Want to Be a Secretary	E. G. Williamson & Milton E. Hahn	c-10m	1943	Video (BW version dated '41)
If You Knew How I Feel: Brad's Learning Disability	(Centron Corporation)	c-18m	1982	Video
If You Knew How I Feel: Jana and the Crowing Hen	(Centron Corporation)	c-16m	1983	
If You Knew How I Feel: Scott's Old Friend	(Centron Corporation)	c-22m	1983	
Igor's Dancing Stallions: Yugoslavia	(Sunrise Films of Toronto); Deepa & Paul Saltzman, Fred Harris (producer); Peter Rowe	c-24m	1980	World Cultures & Youth (Canada: Spread Your Wings); also known as The Stallions of Lipica
I'm a Fool	(Perspective Films) Robert Geller (producer); Noel Black	c-38m	1977	
Imagineering	Joel Marks (producer); Linda K Haskins	c-30m	1986	
Imaging a Hidden World: The Light Microscope	(BioMedia Associates); Bill Walker (producer); Bruce J. Russell; narrator: Robin King	c-15m	1984	
Immigration in America's History		c-11m	January 4, 1960	Video
Imperialism and European Expansion		c-14m	March 1, 1960	Video
The Importance of Making Notes	David A. Smart (producer); Harl B. Douglas	c-10m	May 21, 1951	Video
Improve Your Handwriting	David A. Smart (producer)	bw-10m	September 14, 1949	
Improve Your Oral Reports	Loren Reid	c-14m	June 12, 1968	Video
Improve Your Personality	David A. Smart (producer)	bw-10m	May 18, 1951	Video
Improve Your Pronunciation	David A. Smart (producer); Davis Edwards	bw-11m	February 10, 1949, revised 2nd version 1971	Video (1949 version) Video (1971 version)
Improve Your Punctuation	Ralph B. Long	bw-11m	September 21, 1959	
Improve Your Reading	David A. Smart (producer); John J. DeBoer	c-10m	February 20, 1947	Video
Improve Your Spelling	David A. Smart (producer)	bw-10m	November 16, 1951	Video
Improve Your Study Habits	H.B. McDaniel	c-11m	May 1, 1961	
Improving America's Health		c-11m	November 2, 1959	Video
Improving Your Posture	David A. Smart (producer); Erwin F. Beyer	bw-11m	March 11, 1949	Video
Improving Your Posture (2nd edition)	Erwin F. Beyer	c-11m	March 1, 1971	Video
Improving Your Vocabulary		c-11m	February 1, 1966	
The Incas	I. James Quillen	c-11m	April 3, 1961	
India and Pakistan: Lands and Peoples	Joseph E. Spencer	c-13m	June 1, 1956	Video
Indian Boy in Today's World	(New Document Productions)	c-14m	September 9, 1971	
Indian Influences in the United States	David A. Baerreis	c-11m	April 1, 1964	
Indians of Mexico: The Tarascans		c-11m	June 2, 1975	
India's History: British Colony to Independence	Merrill R. Goodall	c-11m	May 17, 1956	Video
India's History: Early Civilizations	Merrill R. Goodall	c-11m	May 1, 1956	
India's History: Mogul Empire to Europeen Colonization	Merrill R. Goodall	c-11m	May 9, 1956	
Indonesia: The Land and the People	J.O.M. Broek	c-13m	February 20, 1957	Video (BW version)
Inertial Mass and the Laws of Motion	Alfred M. Bork	c-13m	November 1, 1968	
Infectious Diseases and Man-Made Defenses	William Burrows	c-11m	October 3, 1960	Video
Infectious Diseases and Natural Body Defenses	William Burrows	c-11m	October 10, 1961	
Inheriting Your Physical Traits	Alfred T. Collette	c-11m	September 9, 1970 (edited '69)	Video
Inquiring into Life	(Bill Walker Productions & BioMedia Associates)	c-15m	1982	Biological Sciences; Video
Insect Enemies and Their Control	John V. Osmun	c-11m	November 1, 1962	Video
Insect Life Cycles		c-series of 8mm loops	January 28, 1975	Centron Corporation made another film with the same title in 1980, reissued by Coronet
Insects and Their Homes	Herbert A. Smith	c-10m	July 3, 1967	
Insects: How to Recognize Them		c-11m	May 1, 1964	
Insects Through the Winter		c-10m	July 1, 1968	Video
Installment Buying	David A. Smart (producer); Albert Haring	c-11m	September 24, 1948	Video
Instructional Films: The New Way to Greater Education	David A. Smart (producer)	bw-26m	March 19, 1948	
Instruments of the Band and Orchestra: Introduction	Traugott Rohner	c-11m	March 8, 1955	
The Inter-Mountain Highlands	Henry J. Warman	c-14m	October 2, 1967	North American Regions; Video
Intermediate Tumbling	David A. Smart (producer); Karl W. Bookwalter	c-10m	December 22, 1945	
Internal Theft: Stealing on the Job	(Centron Corporation); Linda Haskins; writer: John Clifford; camera: John English	c-16m	1982	
Introducing Atoms and Nuclear Energy	Donald G. Decker	c-11m	February 1, 1963	
Introducing Chemistry: Formulas and Equations		c-11m	February 1, 1966	
Introducing Chemistry: How Atoms Combine		c-11m	February 1, 1966	
Introducing Chemistry: Types of Chemical Change		c-11m	February 1, 1966	
Introducing Ecology: Dependence and Sharing	Clifford G. McCollum	c-12m	August 21, 1972	
Introducing Sets, Numbers and Numerals		bw-11m	April 1, 1966	
Introducing Shapes, Lines and Angles	Irvin H. Brune	c-12m	April 1, 1966	
Introducing the Vertebrates		c-24m	February 23, 1967	
Introduction to the Cardiovascular System		c-14m	1982	Cardiology: You & Your Heart
Introduction to Chemistry	David A. Smart (producer); Therald Moeller	c-11m	December 22, 1949	Video
Introduction to Electricity	David A. Smart (producer); Ira C. Davis	bw-11m	February 26, 1948	Video
Introduction to Electricity (2nd edition)	Sam Adams	c-11m	January 4, 1971	
Introduction to Foreign Trade	David A. Smart (producer); Harold J. Heck	c-11m	August 6, 1951	Video (BW version)
Introduction to Physics	David A. Smart (producer); Ira C. Davis	c-11m	November 23, 1949	Video
Inventions in America's Growth: 1750-1850	Roy A. Price	c-11m	November 1, 1956	Video
Inventions in America's Growth: 1850-1910	Roy A. Price	c-11m	November 1, 1956	Video
The Invertebrates	John Urban; revised by Mike Carlson	c-14m	December 3, 1962	
Invertebrates: Sponges, Coelentrates and Worms	Mike Carlson & Joel Marks (producers); Mel Waskin	c-19m	1990	
Investigating Physical Science	Malcolm Correll, Robert B. Sund & Robert A. Vasconcellos	c-10 mini-shorts (4m each)	1976	
Ionization	Paul M. Wright	c-19m	May 28, 1959	Video
Ireland: The Land and the People	Frank E. Sorenson	c-11m	July 3, 1957	
Isaac Newton	Carl B. Boyer	c-14m	September 11, 1959	Video
Isle of Joy	Marshall Izen	c-7m	1971	animated cartoon
Israel: The Land and the People	Joseph E. Spencer	c-14m	May 1, 1970	Snippet video
It Doesn't Have to Hurt		c-12m	1982	Dentistry Today
It Doesn't Hurt		c-10m	1944	
The Italian Peninsula	David A. Smart (producer)	c-11m	August 23, 1950	Video
Italy: The Land and the People	John H. Garland	c-10m	May 1, 1963, revised 2nd version 1977	
It's Fun to Read Books	David A. Smart (producer); Alice Lohrer	c-11m	March 20, 1951	
It's Your Move: Decisions for Discussion		bw-10m	1969	

== J ==
Title	Major credits (mostly advisers prior to '70s)	Black & white or color (& running time)	Year / copyright date	Notes
Jack Visits Costa Rica	David A. Smart (producer); John H. Furby	c-11m	September 30, 1947	Video
Jafar's Blue Tiles: Iran	(Sunrise Films of Toronto); Deepa Saltzman	c-24m	1978	World Cultures & Youth (Canada: Spread Your Wings); Video
The Jamestown Colony 1607 Through 1620	Allen W. Moger	c-17m	November 1, 1957	Video
Japan: A Historical Overview	Delmer M. Brown	c-14m	June 1, 1964	Video
Japan: The Land and the People	John Smart (producer); Joseph E. Spencer	c-10m	December 16, 1952	
Japan: The Land and the People (2nd edition)	Joseph E. Spencer (collaborator)	c-16m	October 3, 1973	Video
Jets and Rockets: How They Work	Nathan S. Washton	c-12m	February 10, 1967	
Jimmy Visits the City	A.M. Johnston	c-11m	July 1, 1954	
Jingle Bells	Bill Walker (producer); animators: Gordon A. Sheehan, Barry Young & Charles DiCapo; editor: Bib Gronowski; music: DiCapo Productions	c-6m	1981	Animated cartoon; Video
Joan Avoids a Cold	writer: Mary B. Greer	c-10m	1941	Video (BW version)
Joan Avoids a Cold (2nd edition)		c-11m	July 1, 1964	
John Smith: I Remember Jamestown		c-9m	1976	
Johnny Appleseed: A Legend of Frontier Life		c-15m	March 2, 1954	Video
The Jolly Corner	(Perspective Films); Robert Geller (producer); Noel Black	c-43m	1977	
Joshua's Soapstone Carving: Canada	(Sunrise Films of Toronto); Fred Harris & Paul Quigley (producer); Don McBrearty	c-22m	1981	World Cultures & Youth (Canada: Spread Your Wings); also known as Joshua's First Carving
Journey to a Star		c-19m	October 1, 1970	Video
Julia the Gourdcarver: Peru	(Sunrise Films of Toronto); Paul Saltzman (producer)	c-24m	1978	World Cultures & Youth (Canada: Spread Your Wings); also known as Child of the Andes
Jumpy, the Grasshopper	Victor H. Kelley	c-11m	December 8, 1972	
Justice and the Criminal Courts	(TRUST Inc.)	c-25m	1974	Justice; Video

== K ==
Title	Major credits (mostly advisers prior to '70s)	Black & white or color (& running time)	Year / copyright date	Notes
Kathy's Pacing Horse: Australia	(Sunrise Films of Toronto); Deepa & Paul Saltzman, Fred Harris (producer); Paul Quigley	c-24m	1981	World Cultures & Youth (Canada: Spread Your Wings); also known as Kathy and Alchemy
Keep Up with Your Studies	David A. Smart (producer); William Gerard Brink	c-11m	December 7, 1949	Video
Keeping Clean and Neat		bw-10m	August 9, 1956	
Keeping Your Mind on Your Job	(Centron Corporation); Douglas Poulter; writer: John Clifford	bw-13m	1982	
Kim's Looking Glass: New Baby at Home		c-12m	1976	
Kindergarten: Twigs From a Tree		c-22m	November 18, 1970	Video
Kindness to Others	Marvin D. Glock	c-11m	December 28, 1956	Video
Kinetic Sculpture of Gordon Barlow		c-10m	1974	
Know Your Library	David A. Smart (producer); Alice Lohrer	c-10m	June 27, 1946, revised 2nd edition 1962	Video
Know Your Library	Bill Walker (producer); Mel Waskin	c-13m	1983	
Korea: Performing Arts		c-21m	1988	
The Korean War	Lou Reda & Mort Zimmerman (producer); Don Horan	c-3 parts (46m total)	1988	
Kurtis, Hollywood Stuntboy: U.S.A.	(Sunrise Films of Toronto); Paul Quigley (producer); Peter Rowe	c-24m	1981	World Cultures & Youth (Canada: Spread Your Wings); also known as Kurtis in Hollywood
Kyoto: Exploring with Larry		c-10m	January 14, 1974	

== L ==
Title	Major credits (mostly advisers prior to '70s)	Black & white or color (& running time)	Year / copyright date	Notes
The Labor Movement: Beginnings and Growth in America	Foster Rhea Dulles	c-14m	January 29, 1959	
Ladybug, Ladybug, Winter Is Coming!	Peggy DeWire	c-10m	1976	Video
Lakes and Streams	(Riverside Pix); Gerald Berg	c-20m	1988	Wilderness Ecology
Land Forms and Human Use	Samuel N. Dicken	c-12m	December 30, 1965	
The Lands and Waters of Our Earth	Richard L. Weaver	c-11m	January 2, 1957	Video
Language of Graphs	David A. Smart (producer); H. C. Christofferson	bw-13m	March 4, 1948	Video
The Language of Graphs	Eugene D. Nichols	c-16m	February 7, 1972	
Language of Mathematics	David A. Smart (producer); Harold P. Fawcett	c-11m	January 30, 1950	Video
Laroussie the Saddlemaker: Morocco	(Sunrise Films of Toronto); Deepa & Paul Saltzman	c-24m	1981	World Cultures & Youth (Canada: Spread Your Wings); also known as Laroussi and the Fantasia
Lasers: An Introduction	Charles T. Walker	c-14m	September 1, 1970	Video
Latin America: An Introduction	A. Curtis Wilgus	c-11m	September 21, 1961	
Latitude	(Christianson Productions); Joel Marks (producer); David Christianson	c-10m	1988	Map Skills For Beginners (part animation)
Latitude, Longitude and Time Zones	Julian Greenlee; revised in shorter version by Mike Carlson	c-14m	April 1, 1965, revised 2nd edition 1979	Video (1965 version)
Launching the New Government: 1789-1800	Lewis Paul Todd	c-13m	March 31, 1958	Video
Law and Social Controls	David A. Smart (producer); Wendell W. Wright	bw-10m	May 11, 1949	Video
Law of Demand and Supply	John Smart (producer)	bw-11m	December 2, 1952	
Laws of Conservation of Energy and Matter		c-8m	September 30, 1958	
Laws of Gases	Marvin Camras	c-10m	September 4, 1958	
Leadership Secrets of Attila the Hun	Joel Marks (producer)- Lillian Spina; cast: David Selby	c-40m	1989	
Learn to Argue Effectively	David A. Smart (producer)	bw-11m	April 16, 1951	Video
Learning About Courtesy	(Christianson Productions); David Christianson	c-10m	1990	Part animation
Learning About Fruits We Eat		c-11m	August 20, 1970	Video
Learning About Human Behavior	Marvin Powell	c-11m	April 1, 1971	Video
Learning About Leaves	Robert W. Richey	c-12m	November 1, 1968	
Learning About Our Bodies	John G. Read	c-11m	March 30, 1954	
Learning From Class Discussion	David A. Smart (producer); Dora V. Smith	bw-11m	January 26, 1950	Video
Learning From Disappointments	Ross L. Allen	c-11m	December 1, 1961	
Learning to Follow Instructions	(Christianson Productions); advisers: James L. Hymes & Georgia Robinson	c-12m	1983	Beginning Responsibility (part animation)
Learning to Study Your State		c-10m	May 8, 1967	
Learning to Use Money	Gilbert M. Wilson	c-10m	May 24, 1973	
Learning with Your Ears	James L. Hymes Jr.	c-11m	January 17, 1968	
Learning with Your Eyes	James L. Hymes Jr.	c-11m	January 2, 1968	
Learning with Your Senses	James L. Hymes Jr.	c-11m	January 2, 1968	
Lee's Parasol: Thailand	(Sunrise Films of Toronto); Paul Quigley (producer)	c-24m	1979	World Cultures & Youth (Canada: Spread Your Wings); also known as The Monk's Parasol
Legend of the Pied Piper	David A. Smart (producer)	c-11m	November 12, 1949	Video
The Legend of the Thirsting Stones	(Films for Children)	bw-15m	August 15, 1950	
Lena the Glassblower: Sweden	(Sunrise Films of Toronto); Fred Harris (producer); Peter Rowe	c-24m	1980	World Cultures & Youth (Canada: Spread Your Wings); also known as Lena in the Kingdom of Glass
Leonardo da Vinci and His Art	David M. Robb	c-14m	October 1, 1957	Video
Leonardo's Diary	(Perspective Films)	c-9m	1975	
Let's Be Clean and Neat	Leslie W. Irwin	c-11m	December 16, 1957	Video
Let's Count	David A. Smart (producer); F. Lynwood Wren	bw-10m	July 16, 1948	Video
Let's Count	Boyd Henry	c-14m	June 8, 1972	
Let's Draw with Crayons	David A. Smart (producer)	bw-11m	June 6, 1952	Video
Let's Draw with Frank Webb		bw-3 shorts (8m each)	1959	
Let's Have Fewer Colds	David a Smart	c-11m	August 23, 1950	Video
Let's Keep Food Safe to Eat	H. Frederick Kilander	c-11m	April 1, 1964	
Let's Learn to Predict the Weather	Fletcher Guard Watson	c-12m	June 1, 1962	Video
Let's Make Up a Story	Patricia Cianciolo	c-11m	August 27, 1972	
Let's Measure: Inches, Feet and Yards	John Smart (producer); F. Lynwood Wren	c-11m	January 26, 1953	Video
Let's Measure: Ounces, Pounds and Tons	Foster E. Grossnickle	c-11m	October 12, 1956	Video
Let's Measure: Pints, Quarts and Gallons	Foster E. Grossnickle	c-11m	October 18, 1956	Video
Let's Measure Using Centimeters, Meters and Kilometers	Linda Forsberg & Leonard M. Kennedy	c-10m	January 6, 1977	
Let's Measure Using Milliliters and Liters	Linda Forsberg & Leonard M. Kennedy	c-10m	January 6, 1977	Video
Let's Measure Using Standard Units	Herbert F. Spitzer	c-14m	June 1, 1970	
Let's Paint with Water Color	David A. Smart (producer)	c-11m	May 17, 1951	Video
Let's Play Fair	David A. Smart (producer); Ted Peshak; consultant: William E. Young	bw-9m	July 12, 1949	Video
Let's Pronounce Well	David A. Smart (producer); Hart R. Douglass	bw-11m	March 20, 1952	
Let's Share with Others	David A. Smart (producer); Ted Peshak; consultant: Elizabeth B. Carey	bw-10m	March 15, 1950 revised 2nd edition 1968	Video (1950 version) Video (1968 version)
Let's Visit a Poultry Farm	David A. Smart (producer); I. Owen Foster	bw-10m	February 18, 1948	Video
Let's Visit a Tree Farm	D.P. Duncan	c-11m	November 1, 1967	Video
Let's Watch Plants Grow	Paul A. Kambly	c-10m	March 1, 1962	
A Letter to Grandmother	A. Sterl Artley	c-19m	1942 (shorter version reissued May 1, 1964)	
Letter Writing for Beginners		c-11m	October 2, 1961	Video
The Lewis and Clark Journey	Lewis Atherton	c-17m	September 3, 1968	Video
Library Organization	David A. Smart (producer); Alice Rohrer	bw-11m	February 19, 1951	Video
Life Around the World		c-series of 8mm loops	October 11, 1972	
Life and Death in a Pond		c-15m	1981	Video
Life at Salt Point	consultant: John F. Storr & Burt A. Sellers	c-15m	March 31, 1978	Video
Life in the Alps: Austria	Earl B. Shaw	c-11m	November 1, 1958	
Life in Ancient Greece: Home and Education	Lewis Paul Todds	c-11m	January 5, 1959	
Life in Ancient Greece: Role of the Citizen	Lewis Paul Todds	c-14m	January 5, 1959	
Life in Ancient Rome: The Family	Lewis Paul Todd	c-10m	October 6, 1959	
Life in the Central Valley of California	David A. Smart (producer); W. R. McConnell	c-11m	April 28, 1949	Video
Life in a Coal-Mining Town		c-11m	January 26, 1956	Video
Life in Cold Lands: Eskimo Village	Earl B. Shaw	bw-11m	June 1, 1956	
Life in a Cubic Foot of Air	Ernest E. Bayles	c-11m	December 1, 1958	Video
Life in a Cubic Foot of Soil	Ernest E. Bayles	c-11m	May 27, 1963	Video
Life in a Drop of Water	David A. Smart (producer); Robert T. Halt	c-11m	July 7, 1947	Video
Life in a Drop of Water (2nd edition)		c-10m	August 11, 1975	
Life in a Fishing Village	David A. Smart (producer); Clyde F. Kohn	bw-11m	October 27, 1948	Video
Life in Grasslands (Argentine Pampas)	Frank E. Sorenson	c-11m	April 3, 1961	
Life in the High Andes	Frank E. Sorenson	c-11m	April 22, 1961	
Life in Hot, Dry Lands: California	David A. Smart (producer); W. R. McConnell	c-10m	May 4, 1949	Video
Life in Hot Rain Forests (Amazon Basin)	Frank E. Sorenson	c-14m	April 10, 1961	
Life in Hot, Wet Lands: The Congo Basin	David A. Smart (producer)	bw-10m	November 8, 1949	Video
Life in the Jamestown Colony		c-40m	February 17, 1967	
Life in Lost Creek: Fresh Water Ecology	John Henry Sather & David A. Casteel	c-15m	March 31, 1978	Video
Life in Lowlands: The Netherlands	David A. Smart (producer); Clyde Kohn & David A. Smart	c-10m	March 9, 1949	
Life in a Medieval Town	Frederic C. Lane (collaborator)	c-16m	February 1, 1965	Video
Life in Mediterranean Lands	consultants: Norian J. G. Pounds & William B. Klein	c-11m	January 2, 1963, revised 2nd version 1978	Video
Life in Mediterranean Lands: California	David A. Smart (producer); W. R. McConnell	c-11m	May 4, 1949	Video
Life in Mountains: Switzerland	David A. Smart (producer)	c-11m	September 16, 1949	Video
Life in the Nile Valley	David A. Smart (producer); John H. Garland	bw-11m	September 30, 1952	Video
Life in Northern Lands: Norway	Einar Haugen	c-11m	September 3, 1954	Video
Life in the Oasis: North Africa		c-11m	April 2, 1962	
Life in a Pond	David A. Smart (producer); N. E. Bingham	c-11m	April 15, 1950, revised 2nd version 1970	Video
Life of a Primitive People: Africa		c-14m	March 15, 1957	
Life of Christ in Art		c-24m	January 26, 1956	
Life of Nomad People: Desert Dwellers (In Algeria)	David A. Smart (producer); W.R. McConnell	c-11m	September 23, 1949	Video
Life of a Philippine Family	C.W. Hunnicutt	c-11m	September 11, 1957	
Life on a Cattle Ranch	Louis Clyde Stoumen	c-11m	April 25, 1955	
Life On the Edge		c-19m	1991	West Africa
Life on a French Farm	David A. Smart (producer); W. R. McConnell	bw-10m	June 14, 1949	Video (French version)
Life on a Sheep Ranch	George B. Smith	c-11m	May 11, 1955	Video
Lifestyle and Rehabilitation		c-13m	1982	Cardiology: You & Your Heart
Light	advisers: Fred F. Wins & Virginia Kaufman	c-14m	1990	Matter and Energy For Beginners (part animation)
Light All About Us	Nelson F. Beeler	bw-11m	September 20, 1954	Exploring Science; Video
Light All About Us (2nd edition)	Nelson F. Beeler	c-10m	1973	Exploring Science; Video
Light and the Electromagnetic Spectrum	(Centron Corporation)	c-14m	1986	The Physical Sciences
Light and Images	(Centron Corporation); Joel Marks (producer); Mel Waskin; designer: Ellen Bowen	c-11m	1986	The Physical Sciences; Video
Light, Color & the Visible Spectrum	(Centron Corporation); Mel Waskin	c-13m	1986	The Physical Sciences; snippet video
Light for Beginners	Clifford G. McCollum	c-11m	November 17, 1960	Video
Light: Illumination and Its Measurement	Paul L. Copeland & Edward Piotrowski	c-14m	November 14, 1961	Video
Light: Lenses and Optical Instruments	Paul L. Copeland & Edward Piotrowski	c-14m	October 2, 1961	Video
Light: Reflection	Paul L. Copeland & Edward Piotrowski	c-13m	November 16, 1961	
Light: Refraction	Paul L. Copeland & Edward Piotrowski	c-13m	November 7, 1961	
Light: Wave and Quantum Theories	Paul L. Copeland & Edward Piotrowski	c-11m	November 16, 1961	
The Lighthouse I Work In		c-11m	July 7, 1972	
Lightning and Thunder		c-12m	April 17, 1967	
Limestone Caverns	Alonzo W. Pond	c-11m	1943	
Linda and Jimmy	Kathleen Charmaz & Rita Brooks	c-17m	December 13, 1977	Changing Scene; Video
Listen Well, Learn Well	David A. Smart (producer); Viola Theman	c-11m	November 30, 1951, revised 2nd version 1971	Video
Listening Skills: An Introduction	Thomas H. Wetmore	c-10m	July 13, 1965	Video
Liszt and His Music	Hazel Gertrude Kinscella	c-13m	July 10, 1957	Famous Composers; Video
Literature Appreciation: Analyzing Characters	Kenneth Oliver	c-14m	May 1, 1970	
Literature Appreciation: English Lyrics	David A. Smart (producer); Irving Garwood	c-10m	March 20, 1951	Video
Literature Appreciation: How to Read Biographies	John R. Searles	c-14m	June 1, 1965	Video
Literature Appreciation: How to Read Essays	Gaby Dure Smart (producer); William J. Iverson	c-13m	August 29, 1952	
Literature Appreciation: How to Read Novels	John Smart (producer); Ruth Strang	c-12m	April 30, 1953	Video
Literature Appreciation: How to Read Plays	John Smart (producer); Ruth Strang	c-12m	June 17, 1953	Video
Literature Appreciation: How to Read Poetry	David A. Smart (producer); Ruth Strang	bw-10m	June 4, 1952	Video
Literature Appreciation: Stories	John Smart (producer); William J. Iverson	c-14m	June 25, 1951	Video
The Little Bluebird's Valley		c-11m	January 4, 1971	Animated cartoon
A Little Dog's Adventure		c-11m	January 4, 1971	Animated cartoon
The Little Engine That Could	Watty Piper	c-10m	November 1, 1963	Animated cartoon; Video
The Little Indians		c-11m	December 7, 1964	
The Little Red Hen	David A. Smart (producer); Dora V. Smith	c-10m	September 8, 1950	Animated cartoon; Video
The Little Rooster Who Made the Sun Rise		c-11m	December 1, 1961	Animated cartoon; Video
The Little Shepherd and the First Christmas	Watty Piper	c-10m	November 16, 1967	Animated cartoon
The Little Tadpole Who Grew	Mary J. Bushong	c-10m	September 7, 1976	
The Littlest Angel	David A. Smart & Hugh Harman (producers)	c-13m	October 10, 1950	Animated cartoon; video
Liverwort: Alternation of Generations		c-16m	October 7, 1965	Video
Living and Non-Living Things	George G. Mallinson	c-10m	January 15, 1958	
Living and Non-Living Things (2nd edition)	Robert B. Sund; Dolores B. Streff	c-11m	1978	Video
The Living Cell	John Gabriel Navarra	c-13m	July 22, 1970	Nature of Life
Living in the United States: Introduction		c-15m	October 9, 1974	2nd edition of "Geography of the United States: An Introduction"; Video
Living Organism	John Gabriel Navarra	c-12m	November 21, 1973	Nature of Life
Living Things Interact	John Gabriel Navarra	c-12m	December 31, 1973	Nature of Life
London: The City and the People	Norman J.G. Pounds	c-15m	February 16, 1965	
The Lonely Scarecrow		c-11m	July 1, 1970	Video
Longitude	(Christianson Productions); Joel Marks (producer); David Christianson	c-10m	1988	Map Skills For Beginners (part animation); snippet video
Lonnie's Day	(New Document Productions)	c-15m	June 2, 1969	
Looking at the Seasons		c-series of 8mm loops	April 15, 1975	
The Lungs: An Inside Story		c-11m	September 14, 1977 (completed '76)	

== M ==
Title	Major credits (mostly advisers prior to '70s)	Black & white or color (& running time)	Year / copyright date	Notes
The Magic Frame: Adventures in Seeing	David Culver	c-11m	April 1, 1971	
The Magic Scarab	Joseph Siracuse	c-12m	April 5, 1974	Forest Town Fable
The Magic Well		c-14m	1977	
Magnetism	David A. Smart (producer); N. E. Bingham	c-12m	March 14, 1947	
Magnets	advisers: Fred F. Wins & Virginia Kaufman	c-14m	1990	Matter and Energy For Beginners (part animation)
Magnets for Beginners	Clifford G. McCollum	c-11m	November 1, 1965	
The Mahogany Connections		c-25m	1990	Survivors
Make Your Own Decisions	David A. Smart (producer); Ted Peshak; consultant: Clifford R. Adams	c-11m	March 15, 1951	Video
Making a Balanced Aquarium	(Plymouth Productions-Brandon Films)	c-9m	November 17, 1955	
Making Change for a Dollar	F. Lynwood Wren; revised by Janes W. Reddens & Barbara Pottinger	c-11m	October 22, 1954, revised 2nd version 1977	
Making the Most of School	David A. Smart (producer); Frederick G. Neel	bw-10m	August 31, 1948	Video
Making the Most of Your Face		c-11m	November 13, 1958	
The Making of the River	(Conservation Foundation)	c-11m	January 17, 1955	
Making Sense with Outlines	Paul R. Wendt	c-11m	June 12, 1958, revised 2nd version 1977	
Making Sense with Sentences	David A. Smart (producer); Viola Theman	c-11m	November 23, 1949	Video
Making Sense with Sentences		c-16m	February 28, 1975	
Making Word Pictures	Ruth Kearney Carlson	c-14m	May 1, 1969	
Malay Peninsula: People and Products	David A. Smart (producer); John H. Garland	c-11m	April 22, 1948	
Male and Female in Plants and Animals	Dolores E. Keller	c-10m	August 12, 1974	
Mammals and Their Characteristics	J. Myron Atkin	c-11m	June 16, 1966	Video
Mammals of the Countryside	David A. Smart (producer); Robert Snedigar	c-11m	September 26, 1947	
Mammals of the Rocky Mountains	David A. Smart (producer); Colin C. Sanborn	c-10m	September 3, 1947	Video
Mammals of the Western Plains	David A. Smart (producer); Colin C. Sanborn	c-11m	September 3, 1947	Video
Mammals That Gnaw	George B. Rabb	c-12m	August 20, 1974	Video
Mammals with Hooves	George B. Rabb	c-11m	June 8, 1977	
The Man That Gravity Forgot	Wijnand Nieuwenkamp & Eileen Paolicelli	c-9m	1979	
Man Uses and Changes the Land	John W Morris	c-10m	May 27, 1967	Video
Manager to Manager: Dealing with Difficult People	Joel Marks (producer); Tom Barnett; writer: Lisa Williams	c-11m	1987	
Manager to Manager: Getting Approval from Authorized Departments	Joel Marks (producer); Tom Barnett; writer: Lisa Williams	c-30m	1987	
Managing Conflict	Joel Marks (producer); Kathy Dale McNair	c-23m	1992	Straight Talk on Teams
Managing Your Emotions	Richard Hill Byrne	c-11m	April 17, 1971	
Many Kinds of Jobs	Donald G. Mortensen	c-14m	June 17, 1976	People at Work
Map Projections in the Computer Age	Joel L. Morrison & Jane Parker Ward	c-11m	March 31, 1978	
Map Skills: Recognizing Physical Features	Mel Waskin; advisers: Barbara Winston & Kathryn Joan Shaffer	c-11m	February 10, 1970	Video
Map Skills: Understanding Latitude	Mel Waskin; advisers: Barbara Winston & Kathryn Joan Shaffer	c-11m	December 6, 1971	
Map Skills: Understanding Longitude	Mel Waskin; advisers: Barbara Winston & Kathryn Joan Shaffer	c-11m	December 6, 1971	
Map Skills: Using Different Maps Together	Zoe A. Thralls	c-10m	December 20, 1965	Video
Map Skills: Using Scale	Mel Waskin; advisers: Barbara Winston & Kathryn Joan Shaffer	c-11m	December 6, 1971, revised 2nd version 1988	Video
Mapping the Earth's Surface	Arthur H. Robinson & Randall D. Sale	c-16m	May 1, 1969	Video
Maps	(Christianson Productions); Joel Marks (producer); David Christianson	c-10m	1987	Map Skills for Beginners For Beginners (part animation)
Maps Add Meaning to History		c-11m	January 5, 1970	Video
Maps and Their Uses	David A. Smart (producer)	bw-11m	April 17, 1951	Video
Maps Are Fun	David A. Smart (producer); Viola Theman	c-10m	November 1, 1946, revised 2nd edition 1963	Video
Maps Show Our Earth		c-10m	July 6, 1973	
Marine Animals and Their Foods	David A. Smart (producer); Loren P. Woods	c-8m	November 7, 1949	
Mark Twain: Background for His Works	Walter Blair	c-14m	January 3, 1957, revised 2nd version 1978	Snippet video ('78 soundtrack)
Mark Twain: How I Came Into the Literary Profession	(Chuck Olin & Associates)	c-25m	1988	Video snippet
Marquette and Jolliet: Voyage of Discovery	Joseph P. Donnelly	c-14m	December 28, 1974	
Marriage Is a Partnership	David A. Smart (producer)- Ted Peshak; consultant: Lemo D. Rockwood	bw-16m	March 23, 1951	Video
Martin Luther King Jr.: The Assassin Years		c-26m	1982	
Mary Had a Little Lamb	John Smart (producer); William J. Iverson	c-11m	December 18, 1952	Background for Reading & Expression
Masculine or Feminine: Your Role in Society	Fred McKinney	c-19m	April 1, 1971	Video
Mass and Weight	Alfred M. Bork	c-10m	January 3, 1966	
Math Readiness	Calhoun C. Collier & Geraldine Green	c-4 shorts (10m each	April 2, 1975	
Matt Mann's Swimming Technique for Boys	Matt Mann	c-19m	1943	Video
Matt Mann's Swimming Technique for Girls	Matt Mann	c-19m	1943	Video
Matter and Energy	David A. Smart (producer); E. C. Waggoner	c-10m	April 18, 1947, revised 2nd version 1968	Video
Matter and Energy For Beginners	Bill Walker (producer)	c-27m	1991	Part animation
Matter and Molecular Structure	Charles T. Walker	c-13m	September 1, 1970	
Matter, Matter Everywhere		c-5 shorts (11m each	April 1, 1970	
Maurits Escher: Painter of Fantasies	(Document Associates)	c-28m	1970	
The Mayas	I. James Quillen	c-11m	May 1, 1957	
Mealtime Manners and Health		c-11m	October 15, 1957	
Meaning of Conservation		c-11m	July 21, 1954	
The Meaning of Elections	John Smart (producer); C.W. Hunnicutt	bw-11m	June 29, 1953	
The Meaning of Engagement	David A. Smart (producer); Ted Peshak	bw-13m	March 27, 1952	
The Meaning of Feudalism	David A. Smart (producer); William E. Young	c-11m	January 27, 1950	Video
The Meaning of the Industrial Revolution	David A. Smart (producer); I. Owen Foster	c-11m	June 1, 1950	
The Meaning of Patriotism		c-13m	April 3, 1961	
The Meaning of Pi	David A. Smart (producer); Harold P. Fawcett	c-11m	December 9, 1949	Video (BW version)
Measurement	David A. Smart (producer); Harold P. Fawcett	bw-10m	September 8, 1947	
Measurement in the Food Store	Herbert F. Spitzer	bw-11m	January 2, 1964	Video
Measurement in Physical Science	J. Donald Henderson	c-13m	October 1, 1963	Video
Measurement of Electricity	David A. Smart (producer); Ira C. Davis	bw-10m	February 25, 1949	Video
Measuring Areas: Squares, Rectangles	Harl R. Douglass	c-11m	February 2, 1962	
Meat and Grain: Living in the Plains States		c-15m	October 10, 1974	Video
Mechanical Aptitudes	John Smart (producer); Frank S. Endicott	bw-11m	October 30, 1951	Video
The Mechanics of Liquids	David A. Smart (producer); Ira M. Freeman	c-11m	November 3, 1949	Video
The Media Center in Action		c-14m	September 8, 1972	Video
Medieval Society (Medieval Times): The Nobility		c-13m	June 30, 1976	
Medieval Society (Medieval Times): The Villagers	Rutha A. Heard (consultant)	c-13m	July 16, 1976	Video
Medieval Times: The Crusades	James L. Cate	c-14m	May 3, 1965	Snippet video
Medieval Times: Guilds and Trades	Frederic C. Lane	c-13m	April 7, 1965	Video
Medieval Times: The Role of the Church	George L. Mosse	c-14m	May 9, 1961	Video
Medieval World		c-series of 8mm loops	December 13, 1974	
The Medieval World	David A. Smart (producer); John Day Larkin	c-11m	April 11, 1950	
The Medieval World	Mike Carlson	c-14m	1980	Video
Melody in Music	Traugott Rohner	c-14m	1952	Video
Melon Boy of Tel Aviv	Yehuda Yaniv	c-17m	1974	Video
Menu Planning	David A. Smart (producer); Margaret M. Justin	bw-11m	June 19, 1952	
The Mermaid Princess		c-14m	1976	
Metals and Non-Metals	David A. Smart (producer); Therald Moeller	c-11m	December 30, 1949 (completed 1948), revised 2nd edition 1964	Video
The Metric System		c-11m	September 26, 1958	
Mexican Handcraft and Folk Art	Allen Downs	c-11m	January 2, 1969	Video
Mexican Village Life		c-14m	November 1, 1965	
A Mexican War Diary: 1846	Walter P Lewisohn	c-15m	November 10, 1958	
Mexico: Geography of the Americas (Four Views)		c-10m	April 4, 1955, revised 2nd version 1974	
Mexico's History	W. H. Timmons	c-16m	January 30, 1969	
Michelangelo and His Art	David M. Robb	c-16m	April 1, 1963	Snippet video
Microorganisms That Cause Disease	William Burrows	c-10m	February 1, 1960	Video
Microscopic Life		c-series of 8mm loops	November 21, 1975	
The Middle East	Morroe Berger, Mounir Farah & Ghada Talhami	c-4 shorts (22m each	1979	
The Middle East: Crossroads of Three Continents	Joseph E. Spencer	c-14m	August 29, 1955	
Midnight Ride of Paul Revere	A. Sterl Artley	c-11m	November 1, 1957	
Midnight Ride of Paul Revere	Sharon Hoogstraten	c-10m	1989	Animated cartoon; snippet video
A Midsummer Night's Dream: Introduction to the Play		bw-15m	October 29, 1954	
Midwest Literature: The City Background	Edwin H. Cady	c-13m	May 1, 1970	
Midwest Literature: The Farm Background	Edwin H. Cady	c-10m	May 1, 1970	Video
Midwest Literature: The Town Background	Edwin H. Cady	c-13m	May 1, 1970	
Mighty Columbia River (Columbia River)	David A. Smart (producer); Clifford M. Zierer	c-11m	June 12, 1947	Video
Military Life and You	David A. Smart (producer)	bw-11m	December 26, 1951	Are You Ready for the Service?; Video
Milk and Milk Foods	Orrea F. Pye	c-14m	July 1, 1969	
Mind Your Manners!	John Smart (producer)	bw-11m	March 17, 1953	Video
Ming-Oi the Magician: Hong Kong	(Sunrise Films of Toronto); Paul Saltzman (producer)	c-24m	1979	World Cultures & Youth (Canada: Spread Your Wings)
Minorities: From Africa, Asia and the Americas	Arthur Mann	c-13m	November 1, 1972	
Minorities: From Europe	Arthur Mann	c-13m	October 10, 1972	
Minorities: In the Name of Religion	Arthur Mann	c-13m	November 9, 1972	
Minorities: Patterns of Change	Arthur Mann	c-13m	October 19, 1972	
Miss Havisham	Desmond Davis	c-15m	October 1, 1959	
Mission Third Planet: Creatures of the Land	J. Wesley Bahorik & Candice Carlile	c-14m	1979	Video
Mission Third Planet: Creatures of the Sea	J. Wesley Bahorik & Candice Carlile	c-14m	1979	
Mission Third Planet: Green Grow the Plants	J. Wesley Bahorik & Candice Carlile	c-14m	1979	
Mississippi River: Background for Social Studies	Thomas F. Barton	c-14m	December 19, 1960, revised 2nd version 1977	
Mittens, the Kitten	David A. Smart (producer); Paul R. Wendt	c-11m	October 2, 1952	Background for Reading & Expression
Modeling Clay with Pierrot	Pierre Levi	c-13m	1979	
Modern France: The Land and the People	David A. Smart (producer); Clyde F. Kohn	c-11m	October 5, 1950	
Modern France: The Land and the People (2nd edition)	Clyde F. Kohn	c-12m	1965	Video
Modern Hawaii	David A. Smart (producer); Clyde F. Kohn	bw-10m	October 27, 1948	Video
The Mohammedan World: Beginnings and Growth	John Smart (producer); I. James Quillen	c-11m	July 21, 1953	Video
Molds and How They Grow	Paul D. Voth	c-11m	September 2, 1969	Video
Molecular Biology	(BioMedia Associates); Bruce J. Russell & J. David Denning	c-15m	1981	Biological Sciences; Video
Money: How It Functions	Lawrence E. Metcalf	c-15m	July 16, 1971	Video
Money: How Its Value Changes	Lawrence E. Metcalf	c-13m	July 15, 1971	Video
The Monkey and the Crab: A Puppet Film		c-14m	December 30, 1974	
The Monkey and the Organ Grinder		bw-11m	April 25, 1955	Video
Monkey Rain Forest		c-10m	1990	Wild Places
The Moon and How It Affects Us		c-11m	July 3, 1958	
The Moon and How It Affects Us		c-12m	1992	Part animation
More Dates for Kay	David A. Smart (producer)	bw-10m	April 10, 1952	Video
The Mosquito and Its Control	Thomas Park	c-11m	January 2, 1962	
Mosses, Liverworts and Ferns		c-12m	November 3, 1969	
Mother Duck and the Big Race		c-12m	1972	
Mother Goose Rhymes		c-11m	December 1, 1957	Background for Reading & Expression
Mother Hen's Family: The Wonder of Birth	John Smart (producer)	bw-10m	November 5, 1952	Video
Movements of Plants		c-11m	December 1, 1964	
Moving Day - Tommy's New Neighbors		c-11m	June 1, 1960	Video
Moving Goods in the Community	John Jarolimek	c-11m	August 8, 1972	Video
Moving People in the Community	John Jarolimek	c-11m	September 29, 1972	
Mozart and His Music		c-12m	April 22, 1954	Famous Composers; Video
Mr. and Mrs. Robin's Family	Virgil E. Herrick	c-11m	December 1, 1957, revised 2nd version 1978	Video
Mr. Jingle at Dingley Dell	Desmond Davis	bw-25m	October 1, 1959	
Mr. Pasteur and the Riddle of Life	Helen J. Challand	c-11m	July 10, 1972	
Mr. Pickwick's Dilemma	Desmond Davis	bw-25m	October 1, 1959	
Multiplication for Beginners	David Rappaport	c-12m	April 1, 1966	
Multiplication Is Easy	David A. Smart (producer); F. Lynwood Wren	c-11m	September 23, 1949	Video
Muscles and Bones of the Body	Leslie W. Irwin	c-11m	November 11, 1960	
Muscles and Energy	Bill Walker & Joel Marks (producer); Mel Waskin	c-10m	1988	Your Active Body
Muscular System	Bill Walker	c-16m	1980	Human Body
Muscular System (2nd edition)	Bill Walker & Joel Marks (producers); Douglas L. Lieberman; advisers: June B. Steinberg & Allan B. Sutow	c-16m	1993	Human Body
Museums: To Use and Enjoy	Alice Carnes & Roger A. LaRaus	c-11m	April 18, 1977	Video
Music and Sound	(Perspective Films); Saul J. Turell & Jeff Lieberman; narrator: Rod Serling	c-21m	1975	
Music: Career or Hobby?	John Smart (producer); Frank S. Endicott	c-11m	September 9, 1953	Video
The Music School	(Perspective Films (Robert Geler (producer); John Korty; cast: Ron Weynand	c-30m	1974	
My Life to Live	(Nett-Link Productions); Jerry Thomas	c-24m	March 11, 1969	

== N ==
Title	Major credits (mostly advisers prior to '70s)	Black & white or color (& running time)	Year / copyright date	Notes
The Napoleonic Era	adviser: Leo Gershoy	c-15m	June 7, 1957	Video
The Nation to Defend	David A. Smart (producer)	bw-10m	January 7, 1952	Are You Ready for the Service?; Video
The Nation's Heartland: Living in the Midwestern States		c-14m	October 3, 1974	
Natural Resources of the Pacific Coast	David A. Smart (producer); Clifford M. Zierer	c-11m	February 7, 1947	
Nature of Color	David A. Smart (producer); Ira M. Freeman	c-10m	July 7, 1946, revised 2nd version 1956	
Nature of Energy	David A. Smart (producer); Paul E. Kambly	bw-11m	August 11, 1949	
The Nature of Heat	John Smart (producer); Marvin Camras	c-11m	September 29, 1953	Video
Nature of Light	David A. Smart (producer); Ira M. Freeman	c-9m	July 16, 1948	Video
Nature of Light		c-17m	August 15, 1973	
The Nature of Science: Forming Hypotheses	Walter A. Thurber	c-16m	September 1, 1970	
Nature of Science: How Ideas Change	Walter A. Thurber	c-14m	February 28, 1972	
Nature of Science: Obtaining Facts	Walter A. Thurber	c-14m	December 4, 1972	Video
Nature of Science: Testing Hypotheses	Walter A. Thurber	c-14m	December 5, 1972	Video
Nature of Sound	David A. Smart (producer); Ira M. Freeman	bw-11m	February 18, 1948	Video
The Nature of Sound	Ira M. Freeman	c-14m	January 4, 1971	
Navajo Indian	David A. Smart (producer); Alfred Whiting	c-10m	July 26, 1945 (completed 1943)	Office of Indian Affairs; Video
The Navajo Indian	Adviser: Wendell W. Wright	c-10m	May 12, 1975	Video
Neighborhoods Change	Frank J. Estvan	c-11m	April 21, 1972	
Nervous System	Bill Walker	c-23m	1980	Human Body
Nervous System (2nd edition)	Bill Walker & Joel Marks (producers); Douglas L. Lieberman; advisers: June B. Steinberg & Allan B. Sutow	c-16m	1993	Human Body; snippet video
The Netherlands - People Against the Sea	(Unicorn Productions)	c-16m	1972	
New Dimensions Through Teaching Films		bw-27m	October 29, 1963	
New England: Background of Literature	David A. Smart (producer)	c-11m	March 30, 1950, revised 2nd version 1977	Video (1950 version) Video (1977 version)
The New House: Where It Comes From	Wilhelmina Hill	c-11m	August 25, 1955	
New Look - Family Relations		c-10m	1976	
New Misadventures of Ichabod Crane		c-25m	1981	Animated cartoon
New Zealand: The Land and the People		c-11m	November 5, 1959	Video
New Zebra in Town	Joseph Siracuse	c-12m	April 8, 1974	Forest Town Fable
The Nile in Egypt	(Gateway Educational)	c-11m	January 4, 1965	Video
Nitric Acid Compounds and the Nitrogen Cycle	Frederic B. Dutton	c-11m	June 23, 1959	
Nitrogen and Ammonia	Frederic B. Dutton	c-11m	June 23, 1959	
Non-Manipulative Selling: Proposing	Joel Marks (producer); Linda K Haskins	c-15m	1986	
North Africa: The Great Sahara	(Pathé Cinéma); Joel Marks, Francios Flouqet & Henri de Turenne (producers); Douglas L. Lieberman	c-15m	1988	Great Deserts of the World
North America: Its Coastlines	Hibberd V. B. Kline Jr.	c-14m	December 20, 1971	
North America: The Continent	Earl B. Shaw	c-16m	December 30, 1965	
North America: Its Mountains	Hibberd V. B. Kline Jr.	c-14m	January 15, 1972	
North America: Its Plains and Plateaus	Hibberd V. B. Kline Jr.	c-14m	December 20, 1971	Video
North America: Its Rivers	Hibberd V. B. Kline Jr.	c-14m	January 3, 1972	Video
Not a Game: Sexually Transmitted Diseases	Joel Marks & Elizabeth Claffey (producers); Sidney Lubitsch	c-25m	1989	
Number System and Its Structure	Carl B. Boyer	c-11m	December 31, 1961	
Nutritional Needs of Our Bodies	Leslie W. Irwin	c-11m	September 19, 1961	

== O ==
Title	Major credits (mostly advisers prior to '70s)	Black & white or color (& running time)	Year / copyright date	Notes
Odyssey of a Dropout	Del Nett	bw-21m	October 3, 1966	Video
Office Safety: The Thrill Seekers	(Centron Corporation); Ralph Mizia; writer: Roger Oliphant	c-10m	1983	
The Ohio River: Background for Social Studies	Thomas F. Barton	c-11m	April 3, 1967	Video
Ohm's Law	Marvin Camras	c-7m	April 5, 1955	
Oil On the Delta		c-19m	1991	West Africa
The Old Soldier	Desmond Davis	bw-25m	October 1, 1959	
The Old Woman in a Shoe	Herbert F. Spitzer	c-11m	February 1, 1963, revised 2nd version 1980	Video
On the Way to School	John Smart (producer)	c-11m	December 2, 1952	Background for Reading & Expression; Video
On Your Own	(Seven Seas Cinema)	c (video)-26m	1982	
On Your Own At Home	(Christianson Productions); Bill Walker (producer); David Christianson	c-11m	1986	Taking Responsibility (part animation)
One Day on the Farm		bw-10m	June 30, 1955	
One More Year on the Family Farm?	Jack L. Nelson & William B. Stanley	c-22m	1977	Video
One Rainy Day	John Smart (producer); William J. Iverson, Ed.D.	c-10m	April 17, 1953	Background for Reading & Expression; Video
Oral Surgery		c-10m	1982	Dentistry Today
Orthodontics: Developing Your Best Smile		c-12m	1982	Dentistry Today
Ostrich	(BBC); Mel Waskin	c-11m	1989	Eye On Nature
Otters	(BBC); Mel Waskin	c-11m	1988	Eye On Nature
Our Animal Friends		c-42m	December 24, 1968	
Our Animal Neighbors		c-11m	June 1964, revised 2nd version 1977	Video (1964 version) Video (1977 version)
Our Animal Neighbors	David A. Smart (producer); Robert Snedigar	c-12m	January 16, 1947	
Our Basic Civil Rights	David A. Smart (producer); Jerome G. Kerwin	c-13m	September 13, 1950	Video
Our Big, Round World	John Smart (producer); Zoe A. Thralls	c-10m	October 30, 1953	Video
Our Class Explores the Moon	J Myron Atkin	c-12m	April 18, 1968	
Our Class Works Together	Kenneth D. Wann	c-11m	March 2, 1964	Video
Our Common Fuels	David A. Smart (producer); Paul E. Kambly	c-11m	June 27, 1947	
Our Country's Emblem	Ralph C. Preston	c-10m	December 19, 1955	
Our Country's Flag	David A. Smart (producer); William J. Iverson	c-10m	March 22, 1951	
Our Country's Flag (2nd edition)	William J. Iverson	c-11m	March 8, 1960	
Our Country's Song	John Smart (producer); Ralph C. Preston	c-10m	June 29, 1953	Video
Our Family Works Together		c-11m	December 2, 1958	Video (French version)
Our Family Works Together (2nd edition)	Kier M. Cline (writer/producer/director) [K-1 Productions]	c-12m	1978	
Our Inheritance From Historic Greece	David A. Smart (producer); Elmer Louis Kayser	bw-11m	April 2, 1952	
Our Inheritance From the Past	John Smart (producer); I. James Quillen	c-11m	April 18, 1951	
Our Living Constitution	David A. Smart (producer); J. Donald Kingsley	bw-10m	July 12, 1949	Video
Our Living Declaration of Independence	David A. Smart (producer); Jerome G. Kerwin	c-17m	May 12, 1950	Video
Our Pet Show	Helen Heffernan	c-11m	June 1, 1962	
Our Round Earth: How It Changes		c-10m	November 2, 1971	Video
Our Round Earth: Its Atmosphere		c-10m	September 24, 1971	Video
Our Round Earth: Its Land		c-10m	September 27, 1971	Video
Our Round Earth: Its Waters		c-10m	October 20, 1971	Video
Our Round Earth: What It's Like		c-10m	September 22, 1971	Video
Our Senses: What They Do for Us		bw-11m	July 22, 1958	
Our Small Town Heritage: Memories of Main Street		c-14m	1974	Video
Our Sun and Its Planets	Katherine E. Hill	c-11m	November 2, 1970	
Our Sun and Its Planets		c-16m	1989	Snippet video
Our Teacher	David A. Smart (producer)	bw-11m	November 15, 1951	
Our Wonderful Body: Eat Well, Grow Well	(Christianson Productions); Joel Marks (producer); David Christianson; narrator: Bill Lenz	c-10m	1993	Animated cartoon
Our Wonderful Body: Germs and What They Do	(Christianson Productions); Joel Marks (producer); David Christianson; narrator: Bill Lenz	c-12m	1993	Animated cartoon
Our Wonderful Body: The Heart and How It Works (2nd edition)	(Christianson Productions); Joel Marks (producer); David Christianson; narrator: Bill Lenz	c-10m	1992	Animated cartoon
Our Wonderful Body: The Heart and Its Work	Oliver Erasmus Byrd	c-11m	October 10, 1968	Video
Our Wonderful Body: How It Grows	Oliver Erasmus Byrd	c-11m	October 11, 1968	
Our Wonderful Body: How It Grows (2nd edition)	(Christianson Productions); Joel Marks (producer); David Christianson; narrator: Bill Lenz	c-10m	1992	Animated cartoon
Our Wonderful Body: How It Heals Itself	(Christianson Productions); Joel Marks (producer); David Christianson; narrator: Bill Lenz	c-10m	1993	Animated cartoon
Our Wonderful Body: How It Moves	Oliver Erasmus Byrd	c-11m	October 8, 1968	
Our Wonderful Body: How It Moves (2nd edition)	(Christianson Productions); Joel Marks (producer); David Christianson; narrator: Bill Lenz	c-10m	1993	Animated cartoon
Our Wonderful Body: How It Uses Food	(Christianson Productions); Joel Marks (producer); David Christianson; narrator: Bill Lenz	c-10m	1992	Animated cartoon
Our Wonderful Body: How Its Parts Work Together	Oliver Erasmus Byrd	c-11m	October 15, 1968	
Our Wonderful Body: How Its Parts Work Together (2nd edition)	(Christianson Productions); Joel Marks (producer); David Christianson; narrator: Bill Lenz	c-11m	1992	Animated cartoon
Our Wonderful Body: How We Breathe	Oliver Erasmus Byrd	c-11m	October 10, 1968	
Our Wonderful Body: How We Breathe (2nd edition)	(Christianson Productions); Joel Marks (producer); David Christianson; narrator: Bill Lenz	c-10m	1992	Animated cartoon
Our Wonderful Body: How We Keep Fit	Oliver Erasmus Byrd	c-10m	February 12, 1973	
Our Wonderful Body: How We Keep Fit (2nd edition)	(Christianson Productions); Joel Marks (producer); David Christianson; narrator: Bill Lenz	c-10m	1993	Animated cartoon
Our Wonderful Body: Medicines, Drugs and Poisons	Oliver Erasmus Byrd	c-10m	October 1, 1973	
Our Wonderful Body: Medicines, Drugs and Poisons (2nd edition)	(Christianson Productions); Joel Marks (producer); David Christianson; narrator: Bill Lenz	c-10m	1993	Animated cartoon
Our Wonderful Body: People Who Help Us Stay Healthy	(Christianson Productions); Joel Marks (producer); David Christianson; narrator: Bill Lenz	c-10m	1993	Animated cartoon
Our Wonderful Body: What to Do About Stress	(Christianson Productions); Joel Marks (producer); David Christianson; narrator: Bill Lenz	c-10m	1993	Animated cartoon
Our Wonderful Ears and Their Care	Oliver Erasmus Byrd	c-11m	April 1, 1964	Video (BW version)
Our Wonderful Eyes and Their Care	Oliver Erasmus Byrd	c-11m	November 1, 1962	Video
Overcoming Fear	David A. Smart (producer); Ted Peshak; consultant: Herbert Sorenso	c-13m	February 13, 1950	Video
Overcoming Worry	David A. Smart (producer)	bw-11m	June 2, 1950	
Overview: The Face of Korea		c-23m	1980	
Oxygen	David A. Smart (producer); Therald Moeller	c-11m	August 29, 1947	Video

== P ==
Title	Major credits (mostly advisers prior to '70s)	Black & white or color (& running time)	Year / copyright date	Notes
P.A.T.C.H. (Positive Approach to Changing Humans)		c-16m	July 23, 1970	Video
Pacemakers and Your Heart Rhythm		c-13m	1982	Cardiology: You & Your Heart
The Pacific Coast	Henry J. Warman	c-14m	October 2, 1967	North American Regions
Painters of America: Peter Hurd	(MFC Film Productions)	bw-14m	1969	
Painter's World	cast: Josef Albers	c-2 parts (30m each)	1987	
The Panama Canal	Frank E. Sorenson	c-11m	January 2, 1958	Video
The Panama Canal (2nd edition)	Roger LaRaus	c-11m	1978	
Panama: Crossroads of the Western World	David A. Smart (producer); Clyde Kohn	bw-11m	August 15, 1947	
Papa Penguin's Home Movies		c-8m	1978	
Paper and Pulp Making	Paul W. Eberman	c-11m	February 18, 1955	
Paper Bandits: Checks, Counterfeit, Credit Cards	(Centron Corporation)	c-14m	1982	
Paper Making	David A. Smart (producer); J. E. Hansen & Freeman H. Brown	bw-10m	October 29, 1941	Video
Parents-- Who Needs Them?	Dan McConnell; Larry Pont; Lucille Lindberg, Ed.D.	c-10m	March 28, 1973	Second edition of "Appreciating Our Parents"; Video
Paris: The City and the People	William H. Hartley	c-11m	July 21, 1960	
Parker Anderson, Philosopher	(Perspective Films); Robert Geller (producer) Arthur Barron	c-39m	1977	
Parliamentary Procedure	David A. Smart (producer); Loren D. Reid	bw-11m	July 8, 1952	
Parliamentary Procedure in Action	David A. Smart (producer); Harold H. Crabill	bw-12m	October 8, 1941	
Parties Are Fun	David A. Smart (producer)	c-11m	March 16, 1950	Video
Partnerships Among Plants and Animals	Glenn O. Blough	c-11m	April 1, 1959	
The Parts of Speech	Dwight L. Burton	c-14m	February 1, 1962	Video
Party Leader	(Focus Enterprises Inc.) Joel Marks; cast: Thomas E. Cronin	c-11m	1990	Modern President
The Patient Is a Person	Gilbert Altschul (& Smart Family Foundation)	bw-20m	May 1, 1956	
Patients Need You	(Smart Family Foundation)	bw-18m	November 19, 1969	
Paul Bunyan and the Blue Ox	Gaby Dure Smart (producer)	c-6m	August 29, 1952	Video
Paul Bunyan: Lumber Camp Tales		c-10	1962	Video
Pavlov's Experiment - the Conditioned Reflex	Mordecai L. Gabriel	c-9m	1975	Video
The Peddler and the Monkeys	Paul R. Wendt	c-11m	1945	Video
Pendulum (Turning Point)	Andrew S. Field	c-27m	1976	Video
People Are Different and Alike	James L. Hymes Jr.	c-11m	April 3, 1967, revised 2nd edition 1989	Video
People: Celebrating Our Differences	(Lightyear Entertainment); Joshua M. Greene & Jay Bastian (producers); host: Jason White	c-20+m	1995	
People of Saba	David A. Smart (producer)	bw-10m	December 31, 1945	
People Who Work in Factories		c-11m	December 22, 1971	
People Who Work in Offices		c-11m	December 22, 1971	Video
People Who Work in Stores		c-11m	December 22, 1971	
Peppy, the Puppy	David A. Smart (producer); Paul R. Wendt	c-11m	October 28, 1952	Background for Reading & Expression
Percent in Everyday Life	David A. Smart (producer); H. C. Christofferson	bw-12m	August 31, 1948	Video
Percent, Why and How	Halbert C. Christofferson	c-12m	November 10, 1966	
The Percussions	Traugott Rohner	c-11m	March 10, 1955	Instruments of the Band and Orchestra; Video
The Periodic Table and Periodicity	(Don Lane Pictures); Roger Mazur (producer); script: Douglas L. Lieberman & Mel Waskin	c-20m	1983	Chemistry; Video
Periodontics: Anatomy of Your Teeth and Gums		c-13m	1982	Dentistry Today
Personal Health for Girls	John Smart (producer); George Tychsen	bw-11m	December 10, 1952	
Personal Health for Girls (2nd edition)	Carl A. Troester Jr.	c-13m	April 6, 1972	
Personal Hygiene for Boys	John Smart (producer); George Tychsen	bw-11m	December 10, 1952	Video
Personal Hygiene for Boys (2nd edition)	Carl A. Troester Jr.	c-11m	March 1, 1971	
Personal Qualities for Job Success	David A. Smart (producer); Raymond C. Goodfellow	bw-11m	August 25, 1952	
The Philippines: Gateway to the Far East	Joseph E. Spencer	c-11m	September 16, 1957	
Photosynthesis: Chemistry of Food-Making (The Biochemical Process)	Raymond Elwood Girton	c-14m	February 3, 1964, revised 2nd version 1970	Video
Physical Changes All About Us		c-13m	July 22, 1977	Video
Physical Features	(Christianson Productions); Joel Marks (producer); David Christianson	c-10m	1988	Map Skills For Beginners (part animation); Video
Pierrot & the Wind		c-4m	1986	Animated cartoon
Pigs and Elephants	David A. Smart (producer); Eliot C. Williams & Donald M. Hatfield	bw-11m	February 28, 1947	Video
Pioneer Boy of the Midwest	James B. Burr	c-13m	April 6, 1956	Video
Pioneer Community of the Midwest		c-13m	April 6, 1956	
Pioneer Home	David A. Smart (producer); Viola Theman	bw-11m	November 17, 1948	Video
Pioneer Journey Across the Applachlans	W. Linwood Chase	c-14m	-September 1, 1956, revised 1982	Video
Pioneer Journey to the Oregon Country		c-14m	March 1, 1960	
Place Value: Ones, Tens, Hundreds	Herbert F. Spitzer	c-11m	December 8, 1961	
Plankton to Fish: A Food Cycle	David J. Chapman	c-11m	January 20, 1974 (edited '73)	
Planets	Joel Marks (producer); Mel Waskin; advisers: Noel Swerdlow & Jim Morevec	c-24m	1986	Space Science
Planning for Success	David A. Smart (producer); Ted Peshak; consultant: Clifford R. Adams	bw-10m	January 2, 1951	Video
Plant-Animal Communities: The Changing Balance of Nature		c-11m	February 1, 1963	
Plant-Animal Communities: Ecological Succession	John Urban	c-11m	January 2, 1968	
Plant-Animal Communities: Interrelationships	John Urban	c-13m	January 18, 1965	
Plant-Animal Communities: Physical Environment	John Urban	c-11m	February 3, 1964	Video
Plant Nutrients and Growth		c-13m	February 3, 1969	
Plant Tropisms and Other Movements	Raymond Elwood Girton	c-11m	April 1, 1965	Video
Plantation System in Southern Life	David A. Smart (producer); Thomas Frank Barton)	c-11m	May 2, 1950	Video (BW version)
Plants and Animals Depend on Each Other	Clifford G. McCollum	c-12m	December 30, 1974	
Plants and Animals Depend On Each Other	Mel Waskin; advisers: Robert B. Willey & Tracy Moore Dineen	c-12m	1991	Ecology For Beginners; snippet video
Plants and Animals Share Food	Clifford G. McCollum	c-10m	1976	
Plants Are Different and Alike		c-11m	March 6, 1967	
Plants Are Different and Alike	advisers: Robert B. Willey & Virginia Kaufman	c-12m	1990	
Plants Live Through the Winter		c-10m	March 1, 1968	
Plants That Grow From Leaves		c-15m	1989	
Plants That Grow From Leaves, Stems and Roots	J. Myron Atkin	c-11m	October 4, 1960	
Plants That Have No Flowers or Seeds	J. Myron Atkin	c-11m	November 1, 1967	Video
Plants That Live in Water		c-11m	June 16, 1966	
The Playful Pandas	Theodore Reed & Mary Sue Kerner	c-10m	March 25, 1975	
Playground Safety	David A. Smart (producer); Vivian Weedon	c-11m	April 3, 1947	
Playing It Safe		c-15m	1983	Healthwise
Playing Safe in Animal Town	Diane Imhulse	c-14m	1976	Video
Plymouth Colony: The First Year	W. Linwood Chase	c-16m	September 1, 1961, revised 1980	Video (1980 version)
Poems Are Fun	Ralph C. Preston	c-10m	March 24, 1954	Video
Poetry for Beginners		c-11m	1967	Video
Poetry - So Many Kinds!	Ruth Kearney Carlson	c-14m	September 22, 1972	Video
Pokey the Snail	M. Vere DeVault	c-14m	December 19, 1972	
Poland: The Land and the People	Norman J.G. Pounds	c-14m	March 1, 1961	
Pole Vault	David A. Smart (producer); Dean B. Cromwell	bw-10m	December 22, 1945	
Political Parties	David A. Smart (producer); J. Donald Kingsley	bw-11m	July 7, 1947	Video
Polly, the Parrot	writer: Nancy Parent	c-11m	July 7, 1956	Background for Reading & Expression
The Pony Express in America's Growth		bw-11m	March 1, 1960	
Population Patterns in the United States	Lorin A. Thompson	c-11m	July 22, 1961	
Positive and Negative Numbers	H. Vernon Price	c-17m	November 1, 1963	Video
Posture Habits	David A. Smart (producer); Ted Peshak; consultant: Erwin F. Beyer	c-11m	August 29, 1947, revised 2nd version 1963	Video (1947 version) Video (1963 version)
Powers of Congress	David A. Smart (producer); John Day Larkin	bw-11m	September 30, 1947	Video
Prehistoric Times: The World Before Man	John Smart (producer); John Day Larkin & Anne Stromquist	c-11m	February 27, 1953	Video
Preparing For Employment	Cathy Hurwitz & Richard Ball	c-14m	1992	
Preparing Your Book Report	Dwight L. Burton	c-11m	October 4, 1960	
Preserving Food	David A. Smart (producer); Ritta Whitesel	bw-10m	June 17, 1949	
The President's Cabinet	David A. Smart (producer); Paul C. Bartholomew	c-11m	April 21, 1950	Video
Pressure in Fluids at Rest	James H. Kroakevik	c-11m	June 1, 1965	
Prickly, the Porcupine		c-11m	June 8, 1956	Background for Reading & Expression
Primary Safety on the School Playground	James W. Mann & Paul E. Bloomquist	c-10m	October 31, 1955	Video
Primary Safety in the School Building	James W. Mann & Paul E. Bloomquist	c-10m	October 31, 1955	Video
Primary Safety: On the Way to School	A. E. Florio	c-11m	May 31, 1973	
The Price of Cocoa		c-19m	1991	West Africa
Principles of Scale Drawing	David A. Smart (producer); Harold P. Fawcett	bw-11m	January 28, 1949	
Priority Setter	(Focus Enterprises Inc.) Joel Marks; cast: Thomas E. Cronin	c-16m	1990	Modern President
Probability and Its Uses	Evan M. Maletsky	c-14m	April 21, 1973	
Propaganda Techniques	David A. Smart (producer); William G. Brink	bw-11m	July 14, 1949	Video
Properties of Water	David A. Smart (producer); E. C. Waggoner & Gilbert I. Renner	c-10m	1941 (revised 2nd edition September 8, 1947)	Video
Protecting Habitats	Joel Marks & David Williams (producer); Emma Peddie	c-13m	1993	Sharing the Earth
Protozoa: Structures and Life Functions	Richard P. Hall	c-17m	March 1, 1965	
Public Opinion in Our Democracy	David A. Smart (producer)	bw-11m	December 27, 1950	
Public Speaking: Movement and Gesture	Karl F Robinson	c-11m	January 14, 1955	
Puerto Rico and the Virgin Islands	Frank E. Sorenson	c-11m	July 1, 1964	Video
Puffins	(BBC); Mel Waskin	c-11m	1988	Eye On Nature
Punctuation for Beginners	Harold G. Shane	c-11m	January 2, 1962	Video
Punctuation: Mark Your Meaning	David A. Smart (producer); Viola Theman	bw-10m	November 19, 1947, revised 2nd edition 1968	Video (1947 version) Video (1968 version)
Puppets You Can Make	Miles Breen (producer)	c-18m	July 8, 1971	
The Puppy Saves The Circus	Ruby-Spears	c-23m	1981	Animated cartoon
The Puppy Who Wanted a Boy	Ruby-Spears	c-22m	1978	Animated cartoon
Puritan Family of Early New England	Roy A. Price	c-11m	June 10, 1955	
Pysanka - the Ukrainian Easter	Slavko Nowytski	c-14m	1975	

== R ==
Title	Major credits (mostly advisers prior to '70s)	Black & white or color (& running time)	Year / copyright date	Notes
Radiant Energy and the Electromagnetic Spectrum		c-11m	February 26, 1969	
Radiation in Biology	Harvey M. Patt	c-13m	May 1, 1962	
Radioactive Dating	Bertram G. Woodland	c-13m	1981	Video
Ratio and Proportion in Mathematics		c-11m	November 1, 1961	Video
Reaching Your Reader	(Centron Corporation); adviser: John R. Searles	c-10m	1983	Effective Writing
Reaction Rates and Equilibrium	(Don Lane Pictures); Roger Mazur (producer); script: Douglas L. Lieberman & Mel Waskin	c-20m	1983	Chemistry; Video
Reading Creatively		c-14m	June 26, 1968	Reading Growth
Reading Financial Reports: The Income Statement	(Centron Corporation)	c-12m	1985	
Reading for Beginners: Using Context Clues	Paul J. Kinsella	c-11m	April 1, 1969	
Reading for Beginners: Word Shapes	Paul J. Kinsella	c-11m	April 1, 1969	Video
Reading for Beginners: Word Sounds	Gertrude A. Boyd	c-11m	May 1, 1964	
Reading for Beginners: Words and Word Parts	Paul J. Kinsella	c-11m	April 1, 1969	
Reading for Pleasure	A. Sterl Artley	c-11m	February 1, 1968	
Reading Improvement: Comprehension Skills	Theodore L. Harris	c-10m	January 13, 1961	
Reading Improvement: Defining the Good Reader	Theodore L. Harris	c-10m	January 3, 1961	
Reading Improvement: Efficient Rates of Reading	Theodore L. Harris	c-11m	January 3, 1961	
Reading Improvement: Vocabulary Skills	Theodore L. Harris	c-11m	January 9, 1961	Video
Reading Improvement: Word Recognition Skills	Theodore L. Harris	c-11m	January 9, 1961	
Reading Maps		c-series of 8mm loops	June 9, 1975	
Reading Music: Finding the Melody		c-11m	November 16, 1959	
Reading Music: Finding the Rhythm		c-10m	November 10, 1959	
Reading Music: Learning About the Notes		c-10m	November 10, 1959	
Reading Self-Improvement: Competency Skills		c-12m	1979	Video
Reading Signs Is Fun	A. Sterl Artley	c-11m	March 1, 1967	Video
Reading Stories: Character and Settings	J. Louis Cooper	c-11m	January 5, 1970	
Reading Stories: Plots and Themes	J. Louis Cooper	c-11m	January 5, 1970	
Reading to Enrich Your Classwork	A. Sterl Artley	c-13m	February 27, 1968	
Reading Weather Maps	Glenn O. Blough	c-14m	February 12, 1965	
Reading with a Purpose	Theodore L. Harris	c-11m	March 1, 1965 (completed 1963)	Video
Ready to Type	David A. Smart (producer); D. D. Lessenberry	bw-10m	October 30, 1947	Video
Recognizing Values	Joel Marks (producer); Kathy Dale McNair	c-22m	1992	Straight Talk on Teams
Red Ball Express	Steve Segal	c-4m	1975	
The Reformation	George L. Mosse; revised by Mike Carlson	c-14m	July 14, 1955, revised 2nd version 1979	Video (1955 version)
Refrigeration and Air Conditioning		c-11m	May 1, 1964	Video
Rembrandt, Painter of Man	(Netherlands Government Information); Bert Haanstra	c-18m	1956 (U.S. edit October 1, 1958)	Video
The Renaissance	David A. Smart (producer); Wendell W. Wright	c-11m	May 9, 1950	
Reproduction in Animals	K. T. Rogers	c-11m	July 24, 1957	
Reproduction in Plants	Charles E. Olmsted	c-11m	March 7, 1958	
Reproduction in the Sea Urchin	William V. Mayer	c-14m	October 8, 1965	Video
Reproductive System	Bill Walker	c-16m	1980	Human Body
Reproductive System (2nd edition)	Bill Walker & Joel Marks (producers); Douglas L. Lieberman; advisers: June B. Steinberg & Allan B. Sutow	c-16m	1993	Human Body; snippet video
Reptiles and Their Characteristics	J. Darrell Barnard	c-11m	February 26, 1959	
Respect for Property	David A. Smart (producer)	bw-11m	September 19, 1952	
Respiration in Animals	John Gabriel Navarra	c-13m	April 1, 1970	Nature of Life
Respiratory System	Bill Walker	c-13m	1980	Human Body
Respiratory System (2nd edition)	Bill Walker & Joel Marks (producers); Douglas L. Lieberman; advisers: June B. Steinberg & Allan B. Sutow	c-16m	1993	Human Body
Rest and Health	David A. Smart (producer); Dean P. Smiley, Fred V. Hein	bw-11m	February 18, 1949	Video
Rest That Builds Good Health	John Smart (producer); Elizabeth S Avery	bw-11m	February 23, 1953	Video
Retirement Planning: Thinking Ahead	(Centron Corporation)	c-13m	1985	
Return		c-29m	1973	
Revolts and Reforms in Europe: 1815-1848	George T. Romani	c-17m	March 10, 1965	
The Rhine: Background for Social Studies		c-11m	October 14, 1959	Video
Rhino	(BBC); Mel Waskin	c-11m	1989	Eye On Nature
Rhythm in Music	David A. Smart (producer)	bw-13m	November 16, 1951	Video
Rhythm, Rhythm Everywhere	Patricia Cianciolo	c-11m	May 10, 1974	
Rice in Today's World		c-11m	September 2, 1958	
Richard's Totem Pole: Canada	(Sunrise Films of Toronto); Fred Harris (producer); Ken Lefolii & Paul Quigley	c-24m	1981	World Cultures & Youth (Canada: Spread Your Wings)
Right or Wrong? (Making Moral Decisions)	David A. Smart; collaborator: Judson T. Landis	c-11m	June 21, 1951	Video (BW version)
Rise and Decline of the Roman Empire		c-19m	1980	Video
The Rise of Nations in Europe	George T. Romani & Dorothy Derry	c-13m	December 2, 1955, revised 2nd version 1977	Video
The Rise of the Roman Empire	T. Walter Wallbank	c-15m	April 20, 1959	Video
Rivers of the Pacific Slope	David A. Smart (producer); Clifford M. Zierer	c-11m	September 15, 1947	Video (BW version)
Robert E. Lee: A Background Story	John Smart (producer); Allen W. Moger	c-16m	May 26, 1953	Video
Rocks and Minerals	John G. Read	c-10m	January 2, 1958	Understanding Our Earth
Rocks and Minerals (revised)	Charles Shabica & Ron Tyner	c-12m	September 29, 1977	Understanding Our Earth
Rocks and Minerals: How We Identify Them	Bertram G. Woodland	c-14m	May 3, 1971	Video
Rocks: Where They Come From	Donald G. Decker	c-11m	March 1, 1963	Video
Rocky Mountain Meadow		c-10m	1990	Wild Places
The Rocky Mountains	Henry J. Warman	c-14m	October 2, 1967	North American Regions
Rocky Mountains: A Geographic Region	Earl B. Shaw	c-11m	June 1, 1962	
The Role of Community	(TRUST Inc.)	c-25m	1974	Justice; Video
The Roman Wall	(Gateway Film)	bw-11m	April 5, 1951	
Roo's Eye View		c-25m	1990	Survivors
Root Canals: What's It All About?		c-10m	1982	Dentistry Today
Rubber in Today's World		c-11m	December 10, 1957	
Ruby-Throated Hummingbird	David A. Smart (producer); Olin Sewall Pettingill Jr.	c-10m	December 31, 1942	Video
Rules Are for Gorillas Too!	(Christianson Productions) advisers: James L. Hymes & Georgia Robinson	c-11m	1983	Beginning Responsibility (part animation)
Rumpelstiltskin	David A. Smart (producer)	c-11m	November 12, 1949	Video (BW version)
The Runaway Problem	(Miller Prod.)	c-13m	1980	Video
The Runaways	Desmond Davis	bw-25m	October 1, 1959	
Rural Life of Mexico	David A. Smart (producer); P.R. Hershey	c-10m	March 9, 1946	

== S ==
Title	Major credits (mostly advisers prior to '70s)	Black & white or color (& running time)	Year / copyright date	Notes
Safe Driving: Advanced Skills and Problems	David A. Smart (producer)	bw-10m	September 5, 1951	Video
Safe Driving: Car Maintenance and Care	A. R. Lauer	bw-10m	September 26, 1955	
Safe Driving: The Defensive Driver	A. R. Lauer	bw-10m	September 26, 1955	
Safe Driving: Fundamental Skills	David A. Smart (producer)	bw-10m	August 8, 1951	
Safe Driving: Streets and Highways	David A. Smart (producer)	bw-10m	August 30, 1951	
Safe Driving: Techniques of the Skilled Driver	A. R. Lauer	bw-10m	September 29, 1955	
Safe Living at School	Vivian Weedon	bw-10m	1948	Video
Safe Living at School (2nd Edition)	James W. Mann	c-10m	March 3, 1969	Video
Safe Use of Tools	David A. Smart (producer); Mary B. Greer	c-10m	October 29, 1941	
Safety After School	A. E. Florio	c-11m	February 1, 1966	Video
Safety In The Shop: Basic Practices	Bert Book	c-13m	1970	Video
Safety in the Shop: Hand Tools	Bert Book	c-14m	1970	
Safety in the Shop: Power Tools		c-14m	1971	Video
Safety in Winter	David A. Smart (producer); Vivian Weedon	bw-11m	August 25, 1952	Video
Safety on the Way to School	David A. Smart (producer); Vivian Weedon	c-11m	October 28, 1952	Video
Safety with Everyday Tools	David A. Smart (producer); Vivian Weedon	bw-10m	August 25, 1952	
Safety with Fire		c-11m	November 2, 1966	
Sam Weller and His Father	Desmond Davis	bw-25m	October 1, 1959	
Saving and Investing	Stewart M. Lee & D. Hayden Green	c-14m	February 13, 1976	Consumer Skills; Video
Saving Endangered Species	Joel Marks & David Williams (producer); Emma Peddie	c-13m	1993	Sharing the Earth
Saying No to Danger	(Christianson Productions); Bill Walker (producer); David Christianson	c-11m	1986	Taking Responsibility (part animation); Video
Scandinavian Lands: Norway, Sweden, Denmark	John H. Garland	c-11m	September 2, 1954	
School Activities and You	David A. Smart (producer)	bw-10m	September 14, 1951	Video
School Bus Safety: Elementary		c-15m	1976	
School Rules: How They Help Us	John Smart (producer)	c-10m	January 21, 1953	Video
School Spirit and Sportsmanship	John Smart (producer); Ted Peshak; consultant: Herold C Hunt	bw-10m	September 14, 1951	Video
Schools of Mexico	David A. Smart (producer); P.R. Hershey	bw-11m	April 30, 1946	
Schubert and His Music	Rose Marie Grentzer	c-13m	April 16, 1954	Famous Composers; Video
Science and Superstition	David A. Smart (producer); Ira C. Davis	c-11m	May 6, 1947	Video
Science and Superstition (2nd edition)		c-10m	May 19, 1973	
Science and Wood Utilization	David A. Smart (producer); J. E. Hansen & F. H. Brown	c-6m	June 11, 1946	
Science for Beginners		c-11m	September 1, 1964	
Science Study Skills	J. Myron Atkin	c-11m	April 2, 1965	
Scorpion	(BBC); Mel Waskin	c-11m	1989	Eye On Nature
Scotland: Background of Literature	David A. Smart (producer); John J. De Boer	c-11m	November 28, 1947 (completed 1946), revised 2nd edition 1962	Video
The Sea	Robert O. Pooley	c-11m	March 3, 1958	Background for Literature
The Sea Gull		c-13m	April 2, 1968	
Seagull Story		c-25m	1990	Survivors
Seaports of the Pacific Coast	David A. Smart (producer); Clifford M. Zierer	c-11m	July 8, 1947	Video
Seasonal Changes in Trees	David A. Smart (producer); N. E. Bingham	c-11m	August 17, 1949	Video
The Seasons of the Year	David A. Smart (producer); John G. Read	bw-10m	September 14, 1951	
Secretary Takes Dictation	David A. Smart (producer); Peter L. Agnew	c-10m	January 16, 1947	Video
Secretary Transcribes	David A. Smart (producer); Peter L. Agnew	c-10m	April 9, 1947	
Secretary's Day	David A. Smart (producer); Peter L. Agnew	c-10m	March 25, 1947	Video (BW version)
See Better, Healthy Eyes	David A. Smart (producer); George E. Shambaugh	c-11m	January 2, 1951 revised 2nd version 1973	Video
Seed Plants: Diversity in Adaptation	Charles B. Heiser Jr.	c-10m	1967	Video
Seeds Grow Into Plants	Anthony J Mazzei & Peggy DeWire	c-10m	March 12, 1956	
Seeds: How They Germinate	Charles B. Heiser Jr.	c-11m	December 22, 1971	
Seeds of Tomorrow		c-shorts (adding to 59m)	1985	
The Self-conscious Guy	David A. Smart (producer); Ted Peshak; consultant: Judson T. Landis	bw-11m	August 8, 1951	Video
Selling As a Career	John Smart (producer); C. A. Nolan	c-11m	August 31, 1953	Video
Sentences: simple, compound, complex	John R. Searles	c-11m	1960	Video
Sentences That Ask and Tell	Harold G. Shane	c-11m	October 2, 1961	
Sentences That Ask and Tell	(Christianson Productions); David Christianson	c-12m	1990	Part animation
Serama's Mask: Bali	(Sunrise Films of Toronto); Paul Saltzman (producer)	c-24m	1979	World Cultures & Youth (Canada: Spread Your Wings); Video
Service and Citizenship	David A. Smart (producer)	bw-11m	October 11, 1951	Are You Ready for the Service?; video
Service Station Attendant	Daniel H. Kruger	c-10m	1975	My First Job
The Settlers: Early Pioneer Farmers of the Great Lakes Region	Jack Ruddell	c-29m	January 2, 1968	
Shadows, Shadows Everywhere	Leonard Kaplan	c-11m	June 23, 1972	
Shaggy, the Coyote		c-11m	July 2, 1956	Background for Reading & Expression
Shao Ping the Acrobat: China	(Sunrise Films of Toronto); Deepa & Paul Saltzman	c-24m	1981	World Cultures & Youth (Canada: Spread Your Wings)
Sharing Economic Risks	David A. Smart (producer); Paul L. Salsgiver	c-10m	July 3, 1947	Video
Sharing Time in Our Class	Patricia Cianciolo	c-11m	June 2, 1969	
Sharing Work at Home	David A. Smart (producer); Ted Peshak; consultant: Wendell W. Wright	bw-10m	May 11, 1949	Video
Shy Guy	David A. Smart (producer); Ted Peshak; consultant: Alice Sowers	bw-13m	May 20, 1947	Video
Signals for Sense - Punctuation Marks	consultants: Roy C. O'Donnell & Dorothy C. McCabe	c-11m	January 2, 1962, revised 2nd version 1978	
Silent Night: The Story of the Christmas Carol	John Smart (producer)	c-13m	August 24, 1953	Video
Silicon and Its Compounds	Paul M. Wright	c-13m	July 2, 1962	
Simple Changes in Matter	John Smart (producer)	bw-11m	January 19, 1953	
Simple Demonstrations with Air	Sam Adams	c-11m	February 1, 1962	Video
Simple Demonstrations with Magnetism	Sam Adams	c-11m	February 1, 1962	Video
Simple Demonstrations with Static Electricity	Sam Adams	c-11m	July 2, 1962	Video
Simple Demonstrations with Water	Sam Adams	c-11m	February 1, 1962	
Simple Machines: Inclined Planes	(Christianson Productions)	c-6m	November 23, 1954	
Simple Machines: Inclined Planes	(Christianson Productions); Bill Walker (producer); Mel Waskin, Ellen Bowen & David Christianson	c-12m	1984	Part animation
Simple Machines: Levers	(Christianson Productions)	c-6m	November 23, 1954	
Simple Machines: The Levers	(Christianson Productions); Bill Walker (producer); Mel Waskin, Ellen Bowen & David Christianson	c-12m	1984	Part animation
Simple Machines: Pulleys	(Christianson Productions)	c-6m	November 23, 1954	Video
Simple Machines: Pulleys	(Christianson Productions); Bill Walker (producer); Mel Waskin, Ellen Bowen & David Christianson	c-12m	1984	Part animation
Simple Machines: Wheels and Axles	(Christianson Productions)	c-6m	November 23, 1954	
Simple Machines: Wheels and Axles	(Christianson Productions); Bill Walker (producer); Mel Waskin, Ellen Bowen & David Christianson	c-12m	1984	Part animation
Simple Machines: Work and Mechanical Advantage	Nathan S. Washton	c-15m	January 2, 1964	
Simple Machines: Working Together	(Christianson Productions); Bill Walker (producer); Mel Waskin, Ellen Bowen & David Christianson	c-12m	1984	Part animation
Simple Organisms: Algae and Fungi	Mike Carlson	c-13m	1979	Video
Simple Organisms: Bacteria	Raymond Elwood Girton	c-14m	June 2, 1958, revised 2nd version 1977	
Simple Stunts	David A. Smart (producer); Otto Ryser	c-10m	October 5, 1946	Video
Sir Francis Drake's Life and Voyages	(Plymouth Productions-Brandon Films)	bw-14m	February 22, 1956	Video
Skeletal System	Marc L. Peters-Golden, Marie Westler Metlay & Zachary D. Lazar	c-13m	1980	Human Body
Skeletal System (2nd edition)	Bill Walker & Joel Marks (producers); Douglas L. Lieberman; advisers: June B. Steinberg & Allan B. Sutow	c-16m	1993	Human Body
Slima the Dhowmaker: Tanzania	(Sunrise Films of Toronto); Paul Saltzman (producer)	c-24m	1978 (filmed '76)	World Cultures & Youth (Canada: Spread Your Wings); also known as Journey Through Zanzibar
Smoking, Drinking and Drugs		c-15m	1983	Healthwise
Snakes	David A. Smart (producer); Howard K. Gloyd	c-11m	August 21, 1947	
Snakes		c-12m	1984	
Snap Out of It! (Emotional Imbalance)	David A. Smart (producer)	bw-12m	September 10, 1951	Video
Sniffles and Sneezes (Sniffles, Sneezes and Contagious Diseases)		c-15m	1983	Healthwise
Soccer for Girls	David A. Smart (producer); Marjorie E. Fish	c-10m	March 16, 1946	
Social Courtesy	David A. Smart (producer)	bw-10m	January 22, 1951	Video
Social Dancing	David A. Smart (producer); Edith Ballwebber	bw-10m	June 13, 1947	Video
The Sodium Family	Paul M. Wright	c-16m	October 1, 1963	
Softball for Boys	David A. Smart (producer); Arthur T. Noren	bw-10m	October 27, 1948	Video
Softball for Girls	David A. Smart (producer); Viola Mitchell	bw-10m	October 29, 1947	
Soil		bw-10m	May 26, 1952	Understanding Our Earth
Soil	Charles Shabica & Ron Tyner	c-12m	July 21, 1977	Understanding Our Earth
Soil: What It Is and What It Does?	Verne N. Rockcastle	c-10m	1966	Video
The Solar System	David A. Smart (producer)	bw-10m	January 23, 1951	
Soldier's Home	(Perspective Films); Robert Geller (producer); Robert Young	c-42m	1977	
Solids, Liquids, Gas	advisers: Fred F. Wins & Virginia Kaufman	c-14m	1990	Matter and Energy For Beginners (part animation)
Solutions	Dale A. Dreisbach	c-18m	June 18, 1959	Video
Solutions: Ionic and Molecular		c-23m	1983	Chemistry; snippet video
The Sorcerer's Apprentice		c-14m-(M: puppet film	January 4, 1971	
Sound, Acoustics and Recording	(Centron Corporation) Mel Waskin	c-14m	1986	The Physical Sciences
Sound, Energy and Wave Motion	(Centron Corporation)	c-14m	1986	The Physical Sciences
Sound for Beginners	Clifford G. McCollum	c-10m	September 30, 1960	
Sounds All About Us	Henry J. Otto	bw-11m	September 20, 1954	Exploring Science
The Sounds of Music	David A. Smart (producer); Ira M. Freeman	bw-11m	February 13, 1948	
South Sea Island Life: The Dolphin Hunters		c-19m	May 1, 1970	
Southeast Asia: Burma and Thailand	Joseph E. Spencer	c-14m	December 26, 1972	
Southeast Asia: Lands and Peoples	Joseph E. Spencer	c-13m	February 20, 1957, revised 2nd version 1976	
Southeast Asia: Malaysia and Singapore	Joseph E. Spencer	c-14m	December 29, 1972	
Southeast Asia: Vietnam, Cambodia, Laos	Joseph E. Spencer	c-14m	January 18, 1973	
Southwest Indian Arts and Crafts	J. Lawrence Walkup	c-14m	February 23, 1973	
Southwest Indians of Early America	J. Lawrence Walkup	c-14m	January 2, 1973	Snippet video
Southwestern Africa: The Forgotten Desert	(Pathé Cinéma); Joel Marks, Francios Flouqet & Henri de Turenne (producers); Douglas L. Lieberman	c-15m	1988	Great Deserts of the World
The Soviet Union: The Land and the People	W. R. McConnell	c-17m	September 20, 1956	
The Soviet Union: Past and Present		c-22m	1970	Video
Space Science for Beginners	Phillip W. Alley	c-10m	June 12, 1969	Video
Space Science: Comets, Meteors, and Asteroids	Fletcher Guard Watson	c-11m	1987	Video
Space Science: Comets, Meteors, and Planetoids	Fletcher Guard Watson	c-11m	April 1, 1963	Video
Space Science: Exploring the Moon	J. Allen Hynek	c-16m	November 17, 1969	Video
Space Science: Galaxies and the Universe	Stanley P. Wyatt	c-14m	November 3, 1969	
Space Science: An Introduction	Robert Jastrow	c-14m	February 3, 1964	
Space Science: An Introduction (2nd edition)		c-14m	October 7, 1977	Video
Space Science: Man-Made Satellites		c-12m	January 4, 1967	
Space Science: The Planets	Fletcher Guard Watson	c-16m	April 1, 1963, revised 2nd edition 1987	Video (1963 version) Video (1987 version)
Space Science: Studying the Stars	Stanley P. Wyatt	c-14m	October 23, 1967	
Space Science: The Sun Is a Star	Orren C. Mohler	c-14m	September 1, 1970	
Spain: The Land and the People	David A. Smart (producer); W. R. McConnell	bw-11m	June 22, 1949	Video
Spain and Portugal: Lands and Peoples		c-16m	1965	Video
Spanish Colonial Family of the Southwest	Walter P. Webb	c-14m	March 2, 1959	
The Spanish Conquest of the New World		c-11m	May 24, 1954	
The Spanish Conquest of the New World (2nd edition)	Mike Carlson	c-18m	1988	Snippet video
Spanish Influence in the United States	David A. Smart (producer); Frederick G. Neel	bw-11m	April 13, 1948	Video
Spanish Influences in the United States		c-13m	June 23, 1972	
Spanish: Introducing the Language	Daniel P. Girard & Joseph Raymond	c-10m	March 26, 1959	
Sparky, the Colt	David A. Smart (producer)	c-11m	January 10, 1950	Video
Special Days in February	John Smart (producer); Helen A. Murphy	c-10m	July 17, 1953	Video
Specific Gravity and Archimedes' Principle	Robert H. Carleton	c-11m	February 1, 1963	
The Specific Is Terrific	(Centron Corporation); adviser: John R. Searles	c-9m	1983	Effective Writing
Speech Skills: Using Your Voice Effectively	Carl A. Dallinger	c-14m	January 5, 1970	
Speedball for Girls	David A. Smart (producer); Marjorie E. Fish	bw-10m	December 1, 1947	
Spelling for Beginners	Thomas D. Horn	c-11m	December 1, 1961	Video
Spelling Is Easy	David A. Smart (producer); Viola Theman	c-11m	February 5, 1947	Video
Spirogyra: Structure and Life Functions		c-13m	September 1, 1970	
Sponges and Coelenterates: Porous and Sac-Like Animals	John F. Storr	c-11m	January 9, 1963	Video
Spotty, the Fawn in Winter	John J. DeBoer	c-11m	November 11, 1958	
Spotty, Story of a Fawn	David A. Smart (producer); John J. DeBoer	c-11m	April 5, 1950	
Spring Comes to the City	Katherine Elizabeth Hill	c-11m	March 5, 1968	Video
Spring Comes to the Forest	Alfred T. Collette	c-10m	1972	Video
Spring Comes to the Pond		c-10m	October 1, 1970	Video
Spring Is an Adventure		c-11m	February 17, 1955	Video
Springboard Techniques	David A. Smart (producer); Michael Peppe	c-10m	April 4, 1947	Video
Stage Make-Up: Youthful Roles	(Frangor Films)	c-14m	December 5, 1960	
Stagecraft: General Scenery Construction	(Frangor Film Company)	c-16m	December 1, 1959	
Stagecraft: Scenery Frame	(Frangor Film Company)	c-12m	December 1, 1959	
Stagecraft: Scenery Painting	(Frangor Film Company)	c-8m	December 1, 1959	
Stagecraft: Stage Lighting	(Frangor Film Company)	c-11m	December 1, 1959	
Standing Up For Yourself	(Christianson Productions); Bill Walker (producer); David Christianson	c-11m	1986	Taking Responsibility (part animation)
The Stars at Night		c-11m	March 29, 1967	
The Stars Through the Seasons	J. Myron Atkin, Ph.D.	c-13m	October 1, 1970	Video
Starting Now	David A. Smart (producer)	bw-11m	December 3, 1951	Are You Ready for the Service?; Video
The State Legislature in Action	(Discovery Productions)	c-21m	1969	Video
Static and Current Electricity	(Centron Corporation)	c-16m	1985	The Physical Sciences
Staying Away From Strangers	(Christianson Productions); Bill Walker (producer); David Christianson	c-11m	1986	Taking Responsibility (part animation); Video
Steffan the Violinmaker: West Germany	(Sunrise Films of Toronto); Paul Saltzman (producer)	c-24m	1978	World Cultures & Youth (Canada: Spread Your Wings); also known as Steve's Violin
Stephen Foster and His Sons		c-17m	January 4, 1960	
Stock Clerk	Daniel H. Kruger	c-10m	1975	My First Job
The Stomach Story		c-15m	1983	Healthwise
Stores in Our Community	Janet Catherine Rees	c-10m	October 26, 1954	Video
Story Acting Is Fun	John Smart (producer); William J. Iverson	c-11m	July 1, 1953	
Story of Citrus Fruits		c-10m	October 12, 1956	
The Story of Electricity, the Greeks to Franklin	Duane H. D. Roller	c-14m	May 1, 1968	Video
Story of Measuring Time: Hours, Minutes, Seconds	Herbert F. Spitzer	c-11m	January 2, 1964	Video
Story of Our Money System	Harold P. Fawcett	c-11m	June 16, 1958	Video
Story of Our Number System		bw-11m	January 2, 1958	
Story of Prehistoric Man	John Smart (producer); T. Walter Wallbank; tech adviser: Anne Stromquist	c-11m	December 15, 1953	Video
The Story of Soil		c-10m	June 1, 1960	
Story of a Storm	David A. Smart (producer); Walter A. Thurber	c-11m	June 28, 1950	
The Story of Weights and Measures	Foster E. Grossnickle	c-11m	October 24, 1954	Video
The Story of Weights and Measures (2nd edition)	Ron Crawford (producer); Donald E. Myers	c-11m	February 1, 1973	
Story-Telling: Can You Tell It in Order?	John Smart (producer); Viola Theman	c-11m	August 24, 1953	Video
Straight Talk About Drinking	Joel Marks (producer); Lillian Spina; cast: Tracey Gold	c-30m	1989	
String Trio	(Gateway Film)	c-9m	March 22, 1956	
The Strings	Traugott Rohner	c-11m	March 10, 1955	Instruments of the Band and Orchestra
Stroke and Your Heart		c-16m	1982	Cardiology: You & Your Heart
Student Government at Work	John Smart (producer)	bw-10m	October 8, 1953	
Study Skills for Beginners		c-11m	June 3, 1969	
Study Strategies: Notes	Gabriel Della-Piana & Millie Martin	c-13m	1981	
Study Strategies: Tests	Gabriel Della-Piana & Millie Martin	c-11m	1978	
Subtraction Is Easy	David A. Smart (producer); F. Lynwood Wren	bw-11m	December 9, 1948	Video
The Suez Canal	(Gateway Educational)	c-11m	March 1, 1966	
Sugar in Today's World		c-14m	February 2, 1970	
Suicide: The Warning Signs	(Centron Corporation) & American Association of University Women, Kansas City	c-24m	1982	
Sulfur and Its Compounds	E. C. Waggoner	c-14m	December 31, 1945, revised October 10, 1960	Video
Summer Is an Adventure	E. DeAlton Partridge	c-11m	May 3, 1957	
The Sun and How It Affects Us	Henry J. Otto	c-11m	July 3, 1958	
Supai Indian	David A. Smart (producer)	c-10m	November 5, 1945	Office of Indian Affairs; Video
Supreme Court	David A. Smart (producer); Marshall Dimock	bw-11m	December 21, 1948	Video
Switzerland: The Land and the People	Zoe A. Thralls	c-11m	June 3, 1963	Video
Sykes	Deirdre Welsh	c-13m	1974	Video
Symbolic Leader	(Focus Enterprises Inc.) Joel Marks; cast: Thomas E. Cronin	c-15m	1990	Modern President
Symbols in Algebra	Carl B. Boyer	c-11m	May 3, 1961	
Systems Working Together	Bill Walker	c-16m	1980	Human Body; Video
Systems Working Together (2nd edition)	Bill Walker & Joel Marks (producers); Douglas L. Lieberman; advisers: June B. Steinberg & Allan B. Sutow	c-16m	1993	Human Body

== T ==
Title	Major credits (mostly advisers prior to '70s)	Black & white or color (& running time)	Year / copyright date	Notes
Tad, the Frog	Victor H. Kelley	c-11m	February 1, 1965	Video
Taffy's Imagination	Joseph Siracuse	c-12m	April 5, 1974	Forest Town Fable
Taking Care of Mother Baldwin	(Perspective Films); Victor Nunez	c-20m	1973	
Tale of the Ground Hog's Shadow	Ruth G. Strickland	c-11m	November 7, 1955	
Tale of a Plague		c-25m	1990	Survivors
A Tale of Two Citizens		c-19m	1991	West Africa
Talking and Listening	Miriam E. Wilt	c-10m	June 10, 1968	Video
Tanya the Puppeteer: Russia	(Sunrise Films of Toronto); Paul Quigley (producer); Don Owen	c-25m	1981	World Cultures & Youth (Canada: Spread Your Wings); also known as Tanya's Puppet
Techniques for the Phone Sales	(Centron Corporation)	c-12m	1982	Telemarketing
The Teddy Bear's Balloon Trip		c-10m	January 4, 1971	Part animated cartoon
Teeth: Their Structure and Care	J Robert Schumaker	c-11m	September 1, 1956	
Television: How It Works!	John Smart (producer); Marvin Camras	c-11m	December 16, 1952	Filmed at WGN-TV studios in Chicago
Television in Your Community		c-11m	December 30, 1955	
Termite Colony: A Complex Social Organization	Thomas Park	c-11m	February 1, 1965	
Thailand: Past and Present	(Unicorn Productions)	c-14m	December 30, 1972	
Think Metric! (Metric System/Pienso Metrico)		c-14m	February 1, 1975 (completed '73)	
Those Animals on the Farm		c-15m	1974	
Three Families in Malaysia		c-16m	May 28, 1973	
Three Herding Societies	Adviser: Thomas J. Woods	c-13m	1982	
The Three Little Pigs		c-11m	January 23, 1956	Background for Reading & Expression; Video
The Three Wishes	(Films for Children)	bw-15m	August 15, 1950	
Thumbelina (A Hans Christian Andersen Tale)		c-11m	1970	Animated cartoon
The Time Bomb Within	(Centron Corporation); adviser: Howard Baumgartel	c-14m	1984	Managing Stress
A Time Together		c-14m	1974	
Today the Information Explosion, Tomorrow...?	Richard F. Newton & Mary Lenna Hall	c-16m	February 28, 1977	Changing Scene; Video
Today's Culture - Options After High School		c-17m	1976	
Tom Thumb in King Arthur's Court	Gordon A. Sheehan; started by the Hugh Harman studio	c-20m	November 17, 1963	Animated cartoon; article and video
Tommy's Healthy Teeth	Ross L. Allen	c-11m	January 8, 1959	
Tools for Cutting: Stone Axes to Lasers		c-13m	June 10, 1974	
Topsy Turvy House		c-11m	January 6, 1975	
The Tourist Trade		c-19m	1991	West Africa
The Toy Telephone Truck	John Smart (producer)	c-11m	May 7, 1953	Background for Reading & Expression; Video
Trading Centers of the Pacific Coast (Trading Places of the Pacific)	David A. Smart (producer); Clifford M. Zierer	c-10m	October 23, 1947	Video
Transportation: America's Inland Waterways	Roy A. Price	c-14m	June 15, 1956	
Transportation Around the World		c-11m	January 9, 1969	Video
Transportation in the Modern World	Paul W. Eberman	c-11m	October 2, 1957	Video
Transportation: A Ship Comes Home	Manfred Kirchheimer	c-16m	1969	
Travel in America in the 1840s		bw-13m	November 12, 1957	Video
The Treasure Hunt	Joseph Siracuse	c-12m	April 8, 1974	Forest Town Fable
Tree of Thorns	(BBC); Mel Waskin	c-10m	1988	Eye On Nature
Trees Grow Through the Years	Robert W. Richey	c-11m	March 1, 1968	
Trees: How We Identify Them	N. Eldred Bingham	c-11m	June 2, 1958	
Trees: Their Flowers and Seeds		c-11m	October 2, 1969	
Triangles: Types and Uses	H. Vernon Price	c-11m	September 4, 1962	Video
The Truck Farm	Paul E. Kambly	c-11m	March 1, 1957	
Trumpet, Horn and Trombone	(Gateway Film)	c-11m	December 1, 1959	
Tuffy, the Turtle	Victor H. Kelley	c-11m	February 25, 1965	Video
Turkey: A Strategic Land and Its People	Norman J.G. Pounds	c-11m	August 28, 1959	
Turning Points		c-35m	1978	
Two Stories: Aardvark's Picnic / Oscar's Got the Blame		c-10m	1990	Animated cartoon
Two Stories: Alistair's Time Machine / Mr. Wolf's Week		c-10m	1990	Animated cartoon
Two Stories: When Sheep Can't Sleep / I'm Going on a Dragon Hunt		c-10m	1990	Animated cartoon
Two Views on Socialism	David A. Smart (producer); James Harvey Dodd	c-11m	March 22, 1950	Video
Typical Garden Spider	(Plymouth Productions-Brandon Films)	c-9m	November 17, 1955	
Typing Skills: Building Speed	Lawrence W. Erickson	c-11m	October 3, 1966	
Typing Skills: Daily Job Techniques	Lawrence W. Erickson	c-11m	October 3, 1966	Video
Typing Skills: Fields of Typing		c-14m	November 21, 1972	Video
Typing Skills: Position and Keystroke		c-11m	1972	Video

== U ==
Title	Major credits (mostly advisers prior to '70s)	Black & white or color (& running time)	Year / copyright date	Notes
U.S. Expansion: California and the Southwest	Joel Marks & John Delmerico (producers); Don Klugman; adviser: Richard A. Bartlett	c-19m	1988	
U.S. Expansion: Florida and the Southeast	Joel Marks & John Delmerico (producers); Don Klugman; adviser: Richard A. Bartlett	c-19m	1989	
U.S. Expansion: Growth of a Nation	Joel Marks & John Delmerico (producers); Don Klugman; adviser: Richard A. Bartlett	c-20m	1989	
U.S. Expansion: Louisiana Territory	Joel Marks & John Delmerico (producers); Don Klugman; adviser: Richard A. Bartlett	c-21m	1989	Video
U.S. Expansion: Northwest Territory	Joel Marks & John Delmerico (producers); Don Klugman; adviser: Richard A. Bartlett	c-19m	1989	
U.S. Expansion: Oregon Territory	Joel Marks & John Delmerico (producers); Don Klugman; adviser: Richard A. Bartlett	c-18m	1988	
U.S. Expansion: Texas	Joel Marks & John Delmerico (producers); Don Klugman; adviser: Richard A. Bartlett	c-20m	1989	
U.S. Grant: I Remember Appomattox		c-16m	1976	
Under Whose Influence?	Joel Marks & Cathy Hurwitz (producers); Richard Ball	c-19m	1994	
Understand Your Emotions	David A. Smart (producer)	bw-13m	August 18, 1950	Video
Understanding the Dollar	John Smart (producer); Elvin S. Eyster	c-11m	February 23, 1953	Video (BW version)
Understanding Fire	George G. Mallinson	c-10m	October 10, 1956	Exploring Science; Video
Understanding Instructions	Patricia Cianciolo	c-11m	March 1, 1975	
Understanding Movies		c-13m	1971	
Understanding Our Earth: How Its Surface Changes	Charles Shabica & Ron Tyner	c-12m	July 8, 1977	Understanding Our Earth
Understanding Our Universe	Henry J. Otto	c-11m	February 6, 1957	Video
Understanding Shakespeare: His Stagecraft	(Gateway Educational Films); Levi Fox	c-24m	January 10, 1972	
Understanding Shakespeare: His Sources	(Gateway Educational Films); Levi Fox	c-21m	January 10, 1972	
Understanding Word Meanings	Theodore L. Harris	c-14m	July 11, 1968	Reading Growth
Understanding Your Ideals	David A. Smart (producer); Ted Peshak; consultant: Carter Davidson	bw-14m	June 5, 1950	Video
Unification of Italy	George T. Romani	c-14m	October 1, 1963	Video
The United Kingdom: England and Wales	Howard G. Roepke	c-13m	September 1, 1965	
The United Kingdom: Scotland and Northern Ireland	Howard G. Roepke	c-14m	September 10, 1965	
The United States and Canada: A Cultural Region	Marion E. Marts	c-13m	January 2, 1968	
United States Expansion: California	Earl Pomeroy	c-16m	May 1, 1969	
United States Expansion: Florida	Rembert W. Patrick	c-13m	March 26, 1956	
United States Expansion: The Louisiana Purchase	Oscar Handlin	c-13m	February 11, 1957	revised 2nd version 1977; Video (1977 version)
United States Expansion: The Northwest Territory	Robert E. Riegel	c-13m	February 6, 1958	
United States Expansion: The Oregon Country	Earl Pomeroy	c-13m	March 26, 1956, revised 2nd version 1977	
United States Expansion Over Seas, 1893-1917		c-14m	October 17, 1958, revised 2nd version 1977	
United States Expansion: Settling the West, 1853-1890	Robert E. Riegel	c-14m	June 13, 1960	Video
United States Expansion: Texas and the Far Southwest		c-14m	March 26, 1956, revised 2nd version 1977	
United States: The Great American Desert	(Pathé Cinéma); Joel Marks, Francios Flouqet & Henri de Turenne (producers); Douglas L. Lieberman	c-15m	1988	Great Deserts of the World
The United States in the 20th Century: 1920-1932	Oscar Handlin	bw-19m	January 12, 1967	
The United States in the 20th Century: 1932-1940	Oscar Handlin	bw-21m	January 12, 1967	Video
The United States in the Twentieth Century: 1900-1912	E. David Cronon	bw-12m	October 29, 1974	
The United States in the Twentieth Century: 1912-1920	E. David Cronon	bw-12m	October 29, 1974	
Update Europe	(BBC)	c-series of 5 films (22m each)	1988	
Urban Complex: Living in the Middle Atlantic States		c-15m	October 3, 1974	Video
Urethral Catheters	(Smart Family Foundation)	bw-25m	March 15, 1958	
Uriah Heep	Desmond Davis	bw-25m	October 1, 1959	
Use of Forests	David A. Smart (producer); Thomas F. Barton	bw-10m	March 7, 1949	Video
Using the Laboratory: Chemistry and Physics		c-11m	November 23, 1956	
Using Our Language: Modifiers		c-14m	January 5, 1970	
Using Scale	(Christianson Productions); Joel Marks (producer); David Christianson	c-10m	1988	Map Skills For Beginners (part animation)
Using the Scientific Method	David A. Smart (producer)	c-11m	May 6, 1952	

== V ==
Title	Major credits (mostly advisers prior to '70s)	Black & white or color (& running time)	Year / copyright date	Notes
Valérie's Stained Glass Window: France	(Sunrise Films of Toronto); Paul Saltzman (producer)	c-24m	1978	World Cultures & Youth (Canada: Spread Your Wings)
Valuing Predators	Joel Marks & David Williams (producer); Emma Peddie	c-13m	1993	Sharing the Earth
Vampire	(BBC); Mel Waskin	c-11m	1989	Eye On Nature
Variety and Change: Living in the Pacific States		c-14m	August 22, 1971	Video
VD: Name Your Contacts		c-22m	1968	Video
Velocity and Acceleration	Robert H. Carleton	c-13m	June 1, 1962	
Verbs: Principal Parts	J.N. Hook	c-11m	February 1, 1960	Video
Verbs: Recognizing and Using Them	J.N. Hook	c-11m	February 1, 1960	Video
The Vertebrates: Birds	Mike Carlson	c-14m	1985	
The Vertebrates: Fish	Mike Carlson	c-14m	1985	
The Vertebrates: Mammals	Mike Carlson	c-14m	1985	
The Vertebrates: Reptiles	Mike Carlson	c-14m	1985	Video
Vikings and Their Explorations	Ralph W. Cordier	c-11m	June 4, 1958	Video
Violent Storms	Bill Walker (producer)	c-14m	1986	Atmospheric Science
Viruses		c-13m	1981	
Viruses: Threshold of Life	John E. Kemp	c-14m	October 2, 1967	Video
A Visit from St. Nicholas	David A. Smart (producer)	c-4m	November 3, 1949	Animated cartoon; Video
Visit to Ireland	David A. Smart (producer); Seamus O'Duilearga	bw-11m	September 28, 1948	Video
Volleyball for Boys	David A. Smart (producer); Lloyd Miller, Frank Overton	bw-10m	June 26, 1941	Video
Volleyball for Boys (2nd edition)	Walter H. Gregg	c-11m	March 1, 1971	
Volume and Its Measurement		bw-11m	November 22, 1960	
Voting at 18	David Fellman	c-14m	June 15, 1972	

== W ==
Title	Major credits (mostly advisers prior to '70s)	Black & white or color (& running time)	Year / copyright date	Notes
A Walk in the Woods		c-8m	September 8, 1972	Video
Walt Whitman: Background for His Works	Walter Blair	c-13m	January 9, 1957 (completed 1955)	Video
War of 1812	Robert E. Riegel; revised by Mike Carlson	c-14m	April 9, 1958; revised 2nd edition 1982	Snippet video (1982 soundtrack)
Warm Blooded and Cold Blooded Animals		c-14m	May 3, 1971	Video
Warty, the Toad	Victor H. Kelley	c-13m	February 25, 1973	
Washington D. C., Story of Our Capitol	William H. Hartley	c-11m	February 21, 1956	
Watch That Quotation!	David A. Smart (producer); J. Paul Leonard	bw-11m	July 12, 1949	Video
Water, Fluid for Life		c-16m	1978	Video
Water for the Community	Robert Stollberg	c-11m	December 23, 1958	Video
Water Walkers	(BBC); Mel Waskin	c-11m	1989	Eye On Nature
Water, Water Everywhere	collaborator, Richard L. Weaver.	bw-10m	May 14, 1954	Observing Things Around Us
Water We Drink	Gaby Dure Smart (producer); Richard L. Weaver	bw-9m	September 25, 1952	
Ways to Better Conversation	David A. Smart (producer)	c-10m	September 5, 1950	Video
Ways to Good Habits	David A. Smart (producer); Ted Peshak; consultant: William E. Young	bw-10m	February 15, 1949	Video
Ways to Settle Disputes	David A. Smart (producer); Ted Peshak; consultant: Cater Davidson	c-10m	March 20, 1950	Video (BW version)
We Are the City		c-14m	February 29, 1972	
We Discover the Dictionary	David A. Smart (producer); Viola Theman	c-10m	March 22, 1946	
We Discover the Dictionary (Second Edition)	Viola Theman	c-11m	1963	
We Discover the Encyclopedia	Florence Shnkman	c-11m	June 1, 1971	
We Discover Equivalent Fractions	Frances Flourney	c-14m	July 16, 1970	
We Discover Fractions	David A. Smart (producer); Harold P. Fawcett	c-11m	January 2, 1948	Video
We Discover Fractions	Frances Flourney	c-14m	June 1, 1970	
We Explore the Beach	Helen Hiffernan	c-11m	April 4, 1955, revised 2nd version 1977	
We Explore the Desert	Herbert A. Smith	c-10m	July 3, 1967	
We Explore the Field and Meadow	J. Myron Athin	c-10m	June 26, 1961	
We Explore the Marsh	Thomas J. Rillo	c-16m	March 11, 1974	
We Explore Mountain Life	James R. Wailes	c-11m	November 1, 1968	
We Explore Ocean Life	Nathan S. Washton	c-11m	November 1, 1962	Video
We Explore the Stream	George G. Mallinson	c-10m	February 2, 1960	
We Explore the Woodland		c-11m	May 1, 1957	
We Go to School	David A. Smart (producer); Frederick G. Neel	c-10m	August 3, 1948	
We Go to School	John U. Michaelis	c-11m	July 1, 1970	
We Use the Number Line	Herbert F. Spitzer	c-11m	June 1, 1970	
Weather for Beginners	Clifford G. McCollum	c-11m	June 1, 1964	
Weather Science: Pierrot And Rain And Snow		c-6m	1979	Video
Weather Systems in Motion	Bill Walker (producer)	c-14m	1986	Atmospheric Science; Video
Weather: Understanding Precipitation	J. Darrell Barnard	c-11m	March 1, 1962	
Weather: Understanding Storms	J. Darrell Barnard	c-11m	March 1, 1962	
Weather: Why It Changes	J. Darrell Barnard	c-11m	March 1, 1962	Video
The West Indies: Geography of the Americas		c-11m	January 2, 1958	
Western Europe: An Introduction	Edith P. Parker	c-11m	July 2, 1954	Video
Western Germany: The Land and the People	Zoe A. Thralls	c-11m	July 13, 1954	Video
Westward Growth of Our Nation, 1803 - 1853	Robert E. Riegel	c-11m	May 22, 1959	
What About Sex?		c-26m	March 3, 1969	Video
What Are Animal Tails For?	Paul E. Kambly	c-11m	May 3, 1971	Video
What Are the Military Services?	David A. Smart (producer)	bw-11m	January 11, 1952	Are You Ready for the Service?
What Are Things Made Of?	Donald G. Decker	c-11m	June 6, 1960	Video
What Do Seeds Need to Sprout?	Charles B. Heiser Jr.	c-11m	June 20, 1973	
What Do We See in the Sky?		c-11m	November 1, 1957	
What Do You See, Nurse?	(Gordon-Kerckhoff Productions); Ronald Floethe	c-13m	1980	Snippet video
What Does Our Flag Mean?		c-11m	December 1, 1966	Video
What Good Are Rocks?	Bill Walker (producer); script: Mel Waskin	c-12m	1986	Wonder World of Science (part animated); Video
What the Frost Does	John Smart (producer); Helen A. Murphy	c-11m	May 18, 1953	Background for Reading & Expression; Video
What Is Business?	David A. Smart (producer); Paul L. Salsgiver	bw-10m	March 25, 1948	Video
What Is a City?	W. Linwood Chase	c-11m	June 8, 1972	
What Is Cloth?	David A. Smart (producer); Florence M. King	bw-11m	March 11, 1948	Video
What Is Conscience?	David A. Smart (producer); Ted Peshak	bw-11m	May 2, 1952	
What Is a Contract?	David A. Smart (producer); Dwight A. Pomeroy	bw-10m	May 17, 1948	Video
What Is a Corporation?	David A. Smart (producer); Raymond E. Glos	bw-11m	June 17, 1949	Video
What Is a Force?	Nathan S. Washton	c-10m	May 2, 1966	
What Is Money?	David A. Smart (producer); Paul L. Salsgiver	c-10m	June 26, 1947	Video (BW version)
What Is a Neighborhood?		c-11m	November 17, 1964	
What Is Science?	David A. Smart (producer); N. E. Bingham	c-10m	October 3, 1947	Video
What It's All About	David A. Smart (producer)	bw-10m	October 11, 1951	Are You Ready for the Service?
What Makes a Good Party	David A. Smart (producer)	c-10m	June 27, 1950	Video
What Our Town Does for Us	Ellis Ford Hartford	c-11m	October 4, 1955	Video
What Shall I Be?		c-8m	1972	
What They Have: The Balance Sheet	(Centron Corporation)	c-15m	1985	
What They've Been Doing: The Income Statement	(Centron Corporation)	c-12m	1985	
What Time Is It?	David A. Smart (producer); Calhoun C. Collier	c-10m	August 7, 1951	Video
What Time Is It?	Ron Crawford	c-12m	November 20, 1972	
What to Do About Upset Feelings		c-11m	March 2, 1964	
What to Do on a Date	David A. Smart (producer)	c-11m	February 22, 1951	Video
What the World Dishes Out	(Centron Corporation); adviser: Howard Baumgartel	c-14m	1985	Managing Stress
What You Bring to Yourself	(Centron Corporation); adviser: Howard Baumgartel	c-14m	1985	Managing Stress
What's the Biggest Living Thing?	Bill Walker (producer); script: Mel Waskin	c-11m	1987	Wonder World of Science (part animated)
What's the Brightest Star in the Sky?	Bill Walker (producer); script: Mel Waskin	c-11m	1986	Wonder World of Science (part animated); Video
What's Inside a Seed?	Bill Walker (producer); script: Mel Waskin	c-11m	1989	Wonder World of Science (part animated); Video
What's a Minority?	Arthur Mann	c-14m	October 11, 1972	Video
What's Wrong With Vandalism	(Christianson Productions); Bill Walker (producer); David Christianson	c-11m	1986	Taking Responsibility (part animation)
When You Enter the Service	David A. Smart (producer)	bw-11m	January 3, 1952	Are You Ready for the Service?
Where Do Lost Balloons Go?	Bill Walker (producer); script: Mel Waskin	c-11m	1986	Wonder World of Science (part animated); Video
Where Do Our Letters Go? (The Postal System)	R.K. Bent	c-11m	February 6, 1956	Video
Where Does Our Food Come From?	Wilhelmina Hill	c-11m	December 14, 1956	
Where Does Our Meat Come From?	R.K. Bent	c-10m	June 2, 1960	Video
Where Does Rain Go After It Falls?	Bill Walker (producer); script: Mel Waskin	c-11m	1987	Wonder World of Science (part animated)
Where Does Sand Come From?	Bill Walker (producer); script: Mel Waskin	c-11m	1986	Wonder World of Science (part animated); Video
The White House, Past and Present	Allen W. Moger	c-14m	December 1, 1960	Video
Who Are the People of America?	John Smart (producer); Mel Waskin	bw-11m	February 11, 1953	Video
Who Are the People of America?		c-11m	December 19, 1975	Video
Who Makes Words?	David A. Smart (producer); Viola Theman	bw-11m	April 5, 1948	
Who Should Decide? (Areas of Parental Authority)	Reuben Hill	c-11m	November 21, 1958	Video
Why Animals Live Where They Do		c-11m	June 2, 1969	
Why Animals Live Where They Do	David Williams & Jol Marks (producer); Douglas L. Liebman	c-12m	1991	Ecology For Beginners
Why Can't I Fly Like a Bird?	Bill Walker (producer); script: Mel Waskin	c-11m	1986	Wonder World of Science (part animated); Video
Why Do Cats Have Whiskers?	Bill Walker (producer); script: Mel Waskin	c-11m	1986	Wonder World of Science (part animated); Video
Why Do Spiders Spin Webs?	Bill Walker (producer); script: Mel Waskin	c-11m	1987	Wonder World of Science (part animated); Video
Why Doesn't Grass Grow On the Moon?	Bill Walker (producer); script: Mel Waskin	c-11m	1986	Wonder World of Science (part animated)
Why Don't I Fall Up?	Bill Walker (producer); script: Mel Waskin	c-11m	1986	Wonder World of Science (part animated); Video
Why Eat Our Vegetables?	Oliver Erasmus Byrd	c-11m	May 1, 1962	Video
Why Fillings?		c-13m	1982	Dentistry Today
Why Plants Grow Where They Do	Clifford G McCollum	c-11m	June 1, 1966	
Why Plants Grow Where They Do	advisers: Robert B. Willey & Tracy Moore Dineen	c-11m	1991	
Why Study Foreign Languages?	David A. Smart (producer); Henry Grattan Doyle	bw-10m	August 17, 1949	Video
Why Study Latin?	David A. Smart (producer); Norman Johnston DeWitt	bw-11m	September 28, 1951	Video
Why We Respect the Law	David A. Smart (producer)	c-13m	October 20, 1950	Video (BW version)
Why You?	David A. Smart (producer)	bw-11m	February 28, 1952	Are You Ready for the Service?; Video
The Wide, Wide Sea		c-11m	March 3, 1958	Background for Reading & Expression
Wild Places: Cactus Desert	Joel Marks (executive producer); Partridge Television & Video Ltd.	c-10m	1990	
Wild Places: Lily Pad Pond	Joel Marks (executive producer); Partridge Television & Video Ltd.	c-10m	1990	
Wild Places: Monkey Rain Forest	Joel Marks (executive producer); Partridge Television & Video Ltd.	c-10m	1990	
Wild Places: Rocky Mountain Meadow	Joel Marks (executive producer); Partridge Television & Video Ltd.	c-10m	1990	
Wild Places: Squirrel Woodlands	Joel Marks (executive producer); Partridge Television & Video Ltd.	c-9m	1990	
Wildflowers of the Field and Meadow	Charles B. Heiser Jr.	c-11m	May 1, 1964	Video
William Penn and the Quakers	Ralph W. Cordier	c-11m	June 1, 1959, revised 2nd edition 1982	Video (1982 version)
William Shakespeare: Background for His Works	David A. Smart (producer); William G. Brink	c-14m	December 5, 1950	Video
William Shakespeare: Background For His Works (2nd edition)	Mike Carlson	c-18m	1987	Snippet video
William Tell		c-11m	December 3, 1960	Video
Wind and Air Currents	Bill Walker (producer)	c-12m	1985	Atmospheric Science; Video
Winds and Their Causes	David A. Smart (producer); Walter A. Thurber	bw-12m	December 14, 1948	Video
Winkle, the Merry-Go-Round Horse		c-11m	December 28, 1955	
Winter Comes to the Forest		c-11m	February 3, 1964	Video
Winter Is an Adventure	Helen A. Murphy	c-11m	September 30, 1954	
Wise Buying	David A. Smart (producer); Elvin S. Eyster	c-11m	June 27, 1950	Video
Wise Masters of Wind and Water	(Perspective Films)	c-17m	1975	Video
Woodland Indians of Early America	(US Department of the Interior)	c-11m	May 6, 1958	Video
The Woodwinds	Traugott Rohner	c-11m	March 10, 1955	Instruments of the Band and Orchestra
Woolly, the Lamb		c-11m	November 2, 1956	Background for Reading & Expression
Word Building in Our Language	J.N. Hook	c-11m	February 16, 1959	
Work Around the World	Roy A. Price	c-11m	March 5, 1970	
Work of the Stock Exchange	John V. Tinen & Sidney Parry	c-16m	1941	Video (BW version)
Workers Depend on Each Other (House That Jack Built)	Raymond H. Muessig	c-10m	June 28, 1975 (completed '73)	
Workers Of Our Community		c-11m	1978	Video
Workers Who Come to Our House	William W. Joyce	c-16m	January 21, 1975	Video
Working Safely in the Shop	John Smart (producer)	c-11m	May 6, 1953	Video
Working with Money	Dean R. Malsbary & Richard J. Zuromski	c-11m	1976	Basic Job Skills; Video
Working with Others	James R. Meehan	c-14m	November 9, 1972	Office Practice
World History: An Overview	T. Walter Wallbank	c-16m	October 1, 1959	
World War I	adviser: Gordon Wright	part c-3 films (44m total)	1983	Snippet video
World War I: The Background	Crane Brinton	bw-15m	October 19, 1960	
World War I: Building the Peace	Crane Brinton	bw-11m	October 19, 1960	
World War I: The War Years	Crane Brinton	bw-14m	October 11, 1960	Video
World War II	adviser: Gordon Wright	part c-5 films (67m total)	1985	
World War II: 1939-1941	Crane Brinton	bw-16m	November 1, 1963	Video
World War II: 1942-1945	Crane Brinton	bw-16m	November 1, 1963	
World War II: Background and Causes	Crane Brinton	c-17m	November 1, 1963	Video
Worms: Flat, Round and Segmented	John F. Storr	c-16m	May 19, 1970	
Writing Better Business Letters	David A. Smart (producer); Ted Peshak; consultant: J. Paul Leonard	c-11m	April 20, 1949	Video
Writing Better Business Letters (2nd edition / Somerville High School)	Paul S. Burtness	c-11m	July 2, 1973	
Writing Better Social Letters	David A. Smart (producer)	bw-11m	October 15, 1950	Video
Writing Different Kinds of Letters		c-11m	May 16, 1968	Video
Writing a Good Paragraph	Dwight L. Burton	c-10m	March 1, 1963	Video
Writing, an Interview with Irving Stone	Doron Kauper	c-19m	1976	Video
Writing a Report	F. Norwood Marquis	c-11m	July 2, 1962	Video

== X ==
Title	Major credits (mostly advisers prior to '70s)	Black & white or color (& running time)	Year / copyright date	Notes
X-Ray: a Diagnostic Tool		c-10m	1982	Dentistry Today

== Y ==
Title	Major credits (mostly advisers prior to '70s)	Black & white or color (& running time)	Year / copyright date	Notes
Yang-Xun the Peasant Painter: China	(Sunrise Films of Toronto); Deepa & Paul Saltzman	c-24m	1981	World Cultures & Youth (Canada: Spread Your Wings)
Yarn and Cloth Construction	David A. Smart (producer); Florence M. King	bw-11m	March 8, 1948	Video
Yohannes the Silversmith: Ethiopia	(Sunrise Films of Toronto); Paul Quigley (producer); Richard Gilbert	c-24m	1981	World Cultures & Youth (Canada: Spread Your Wings); also known as Yohannes and the Silver Cross
Yoshiko and the Papermaker: Japan	(Sunrise Films of Toronto); Paul Saltzman (producer)	c-24m	1979	World Cultures & Youth (Canada: Spread Your Wings)
You and Your Blood Pressure		c-14m	1982	Cardiology: You & Your Heart
You and Your Parents	David A. Smart (producer)	c-13m	December 22, 1949	Video
You and Your Work	David A. Smart (producer); Ted Peshak; consultant: John N. Given	c-11m	December 29, 1948	Video
You'll Find It in the Library	Sara Innis Fenwick	c-13m	November 2, 1966	
Your Attitude	James R. Meehan	c-14m	October 26, 1972	Office Practice
Your Body Grows	Oliver Erasmus Byrd	c-11m	August 11, 1967	
Your Body Repairs and Maintains Itself	Oliver Erasmus Byrd	c-10m	October 12, 1966	
Your Communication Skills: The Exchange of Ideas	Wayne Otto	c-11m	September 4, 1969	
Your Communication Skills: Listening	Wayne Otto	c-10m	September 4, 1969	
Your Communication Skills: Reading	Wayne Otto	c-11m	September 3, 1969	
Your Communication Skills: Speaking	Wayne Otto	c-10m	September 16, 1969	
Your Communication Skills: Writing	Wayne Otto	c-12m	September 3, 1969	
Your Earning Power	David A. Smart (producer); C.A. Nolan	bw-11m	July 3, 1952	
Your Family	David A. Smart (producer); Ted Peshak; consultant: Viola Theman	bw-10m	October 27, 1948	Video
Your Family Budget	David A. Smart (producer); Mary E. Weathersby	bw-10m	August 31, 1949	Video
Your Friend, the Doctor	David A. Smart (producer); Donald a Dukelow & Fred V Hein	c-11m	October 25, 1950	Video
Your Health at Home		c-11m	March 2, 1954	
Your Health at School		c-11m	March 2, 1954	
Your Health in the Community		c-11m	March 2, 1954	
Your Investment in the Future	David A. Smart (producer)	bw-11m	February 27, 1952	Are You Ready for the Service?
Your Job	Daniel H. Kruger	c-6 parts (14m each)	January 2, 1969	
Your Nervous System		c-11m	September 1, 1966	
Your New Dentures		c-10m	1982	Dentistry Today
Your Plans	David A. Smart (producer)	bw-10m	October 11, 1951	Are You Ready for the Service?; Video
Your Study Methods		c-11m	October 15, 1964	
Your Study Skills: Doing an Assignment	Marvin D. Glock	c-14m	March 4, 1970	
Your Study Skills: How to Use a Textbook	Marvin D. Glock	c-14m	March 6, 1970	
Your Study Skills: Learning From Pictures	Marvin D. Glock	c-14m	April 1970	
Your Study Skills: Reviewing for a Test	Marvin D. Glock	c-14m	March 6, 1970	
Your Study Skills: Taking Notes From Reading	Marvin D. Glock	c-14m	March 4, 1970	
Your Study Skills: Taking Tests		c-11m	July 12, 1977	
Your Study Skills: Using Reference Materials	Marvin D. Glock	c-14m	April 21, 1970	
Your Thrift Habits	David A. Smart (producer); Ted Peshak; consultant: Paul J. Salsgiver	bw-11m	August 31, 1948	Video
Your Thrift Habits (Second Edition)	Educational Collaborator: Ellis F. Hartford, Ed.D.	c-10m	1964	Video
Yugoslavia: The Land and the People	Norman J.G. Pounds	c-14m	October 1, 1969	

== Z ==
Title	Major credits (mostly advisers prior to '70s)	Black & white or color (& running time)	Year / copyright date	Notes
Zebras	(BBC); Mel Waskin; adviser: Fred R. Wilkin	c-11m	1988	Eye On Nature
Zero, the Troublemaker		c-11m	June 21, 1972	
Zoo Animals Behind the Scenes	George B. Rabb	c-14m	May 3, 1971	
Zoo Animals in Rhyme	Helen Heffernan	c-11m	April 27, 1965	
Zoo Animals in the Wild: Apes	adviser: Jack Hanna	c-6m	1981	Video
Zoo Animals in the Wild: Baboons		c-6m	1981	
Zoo Animals in the Wild: Bears		c-6m	1981	
Zoo Animals in the Wild: Crocodiles		c-6m	1981	
Zoo Animals in the Wild: Elephants	Mel Waskin	c-6m	1981	
Zoo Animals in the Wild: Giant Turtles		c-6m	1981	Video
Zoo Animals in the Wild: Lions and Tigers		c-6m	1981	
Zoo Animals in the Wild: Monkeys		c-6m	1981	Video
Zoo Animals in the Wild: Ostriches		c-6m	1981	
Zoo Animals in the Wild: Pelicans		c-6m	1981	
Zoo Animals in the Wild: Rhinos and Hippos		c-6m	1981	
Zoo Animals of Our Storybooks	John Smart (producer)	c-11m	April 17, 1953	Background for Reading & Expression; Video
Zoo Babies	(Chicago Zoological Park) A.M. Johnston	c-11m	April 17, 1953	Video

== See also ==
- Educational film
- Social guidance film
- Travel documentary
