= Wilderness: The Lost Writings of Jim Morrison =

Collection of poetry by Jim Morrison

- Common edition cover
- Author: Jim Morrison
- Cover artist: Frank Lisciandro
- Language: English
- Series: The Lost Writings of Jim Morrison
- Genre: Poetry
- Publisher: Vintage Books
- Publication date: 1988
- Publication place: United States
- Media type: Print (Hardback & Paperback)
- Pages: 206
- ISBN: 0-679-72622-5
- Followed by: The American Night

Wilderness: The Lost Writings of Jim Morrison is a book of poems by Jim Morrison, first published in 1988.

Jim Morrison, lead singer and lyricist for the Doors, wrote poetry during his life, and especially while in the band. His poetry was inspired by Arthur Rimbaud, William Blake, and many others. In 1971 Morrison went to Paris, France with his girlfriend Pamela Courson, and most of his poetry is dedicated to her. When in Paris he died at age 27.

== Back Page Monologue ==
In the book's back page, a monologue of Morrison appears which states:

Listen, real poetry doesn't say anything, it just ticks off the possibilities. Opens all doors. You can walk through any one that suits you.

== Poetry ==
Morrison's poetry has been called unique and stylistic. This book features many of his lost poems from the years 1966 until his death in 1971. It also features a section called "Thinking of Brian Jones, Ode to L.A". Other sections include, "Far Arden", "Jamaica", "Dry Water", and "The Village Tapes", which are poems Morrison recorded in 1970.

== See also ==
- The American Night (1991), the second and last book of Morrison's poems in the series.
