= The Lost Paris Tapes =

Spoken word album by Jim Morrison

- Cover of a bootleg album of Jim Morrison's The Lost Paris Tapes.

Studio album by Jim Morrison
- Recorded: 1969–1971
- Genre: Spoken word

The Lost Paris Tapes is the title given to a recorded collection of unedited poems and songs by musician Jim Morrison, lead singer of the Doors. Although Morrison intentionally made the recordings, they are considered bootlegs because they were never officially released to the public in their unedited form by Morrison or his heirs.

The title of the collection is however a misnomer, because the bulk of the recordings were made in Los Angeles in February 1969; long before Morrison traveled to Paris. Morrison took these Los Angeles recordings with him to Paris, where they were found among his belongings after his death.

== Background ==
An almost identical copy of the February 1969 original recording with the very same track listings, that had been in Morrison's possession during his final stay in Paris, was given to composer Fred Myrow in May 1969. Myrow who had composed original music for Morrison's film HWY: An American Pastoral, was provided with the only known copy possibly to "give Myrow a better sense of [Morrison's] own work, either while he composed music for HWY or perhaps with plans to have him work on his [forthcoming] poetry album." In a 1994 interview, Myrow recalled:

[A]s a result of doing HWY for Jim, as well as some discussions, we were well along in the plans for a musical that he was going to write the text and lyrics for and I was going to do the music. It was all planned for me to join him in France – he was going to rent a chateau and we were really going to move into the next phase of work on this piece that we very thoroughly discussed – but, unfortunately, we all know what happened. In fact, it happened just two or three weeks before I was supposed to come over .... [It was] the worst shock of my life.

The bootleg also contains Earth, Air, Fire, Water, a poetry piece taken from Feast of Friends, a film produced by Paul Ferrara, Jim Morrison, and the Doors, as well as Dawn's Highway and Phone Booth, both taken from HWY: An American Pastoral.

== Recording ==
According to producer, John Haeny, the spoken word part of the recordings was in fact recorded in Los Angeles, not in Paris as previously thought, and were made at Elektra West Coast studios on February 9, 1969. The February 1969 recording session features a serious but relaxed Morrison taping spoken-word versions of his own written poetry. Morrison can be heard repeating certain sections of poems for technical or aesthetic reasons, and he can be heard giving occasional production cues, such as when certain sound effects should be added at a later date. Morrison's efforts to obtain clear recordings and his additional verbal directions suggest that he planned to use the recordings in a much more ambitious project that would merge his smoothly edited voice-overs with background sounds and music.

Previously it had been believed the later segment of the tape featuring an apparently drunken Morrison playing around in a studio with two equally inebriated "American street musicians" was recorded in Paris due to the ever changing promotional storytelling Philippe Dalecky, who came into possession of a number of Morrison's belongings, was telling. Avid listeners however have determined that recording session took place in the spring of 1969 during the recording of The Soft Parade. The people present at the recording were Morrison, poet Michael McClure on auto-harp, and a so-far unidentified musician. Paul A. Rothchild recorded the session and can be heard on the tape. Morrison offhandedly labeled the resulting reel-to-reel tape of the session "Jomo and the Smoothies", Jomo being a pseudonym for Morrison. The final pieces of spoken word were recorded almost two years later at Village Recorder Studio C, on December 8, 1970, which was Morrison's birthday.

Some of these recordings were later mixed with new music tracks recorded by surviving Doors members Ray Manzarek, Robby Krieger, and John Densmore, and released as the official Doors album An American Prayer. The February 1969 recording of "Orange County Suite" with Morrison on piano was later used and mixed with new music recorded by the surviving Doors members, and released as part of their 1997 4 CD "Box Set". This new Doors version also appears on the 1999 box set compilation CD Essential Rarities.

== Reception ==
Once Morrison gave up trying to perform with the two musicians on the 'Jomo' tape, he broke into a solo performance of "Orange County Suite." A writer for Rolling Stone magazine, believing this to be the final recordings by Morrison, later called this piece:

An astounding version of ... [an] unfinished, unrealized paean to his old lady (Pamela Courson) that had been rejected from at least two Doors albums .... It was a drunken, and mostly ad-libbed, recording. Yet, listening carefully ... one hears the authentic last of Jim Morrison, two weeks before he died, as he roars spontaneous verses and imagery about his hard-hearted woman, his anguish and his obsessions, easily deploying a poetic champion's compositional facility for the natural cadence and spontaneous rhyme.

In 2002, Doors keyboardist Ray Manzarek, who was not aware of the true origin of the recording at the time, has referred to this "Lost Paris Tape" recording as "drunken gibberish," observing, "If you haven't heard them, you're missing nothing."

== Track listing ==
All tracks are written by Jim Morrison.

February 9, 1969 Poetry Session
No.	Title	Length
1.	"Session Start"	1:06
2.	"In That Year... [False Start]"	1:02
3.	"In That Year..."	3:00
4.	"Bird of Prey"	1:55
5.	"Tape Noon"	2:22
6.	"Whiskey, Mystics & Men"	3:38
7.	"Orange County Suite"	5:34
8.	"All Hail the American Night"	5:57
9.	"The American Night"	0:34
10.	"The Holy Shay"	0:37
11.	"Hitler Poem"	0:44
12.	"Can We Resolve the Past"	1:55
13.	"Always a Playground Instructor"	1:32
14.	"There's a Belief..."	0:25
15.	"Indian, Indian..."	0:18
16.	"Woman in the Window"	2:40
17.	"She's Selling News..."	1:11
18.	"Science of Night"	0:24
19.	"Tales of the American Night"	0:36
20.	"Now Listen to This"	0:46
21.	"Babylon Fading"	0:39
22.	"Thank You, O Lord"	0:35

Jomo & the Smoothies
No.	Title	Length
23.	"Warm Up & Tuning"	4:30
24.	"Starting Now!"	1:14
25.	"Orange County Suite"	8:41

December 1970 Poetry Session
No.	Title	Length
26.	"Graveyard Poem"	0:50
27.	"The Politics of Ecstacy"	0:10

Feast of Friends
No.	Title	Length
28.	"Earth, Air, Fire, Water"	0:53

HWY
No.	Title	Length
29.	"Dawn's Highway"	3:57
30.	"Phone Booth"	2:29
