= USS Bon Homme Richard (CV-31) =

Essex-class aircraft carrier of the US Navy

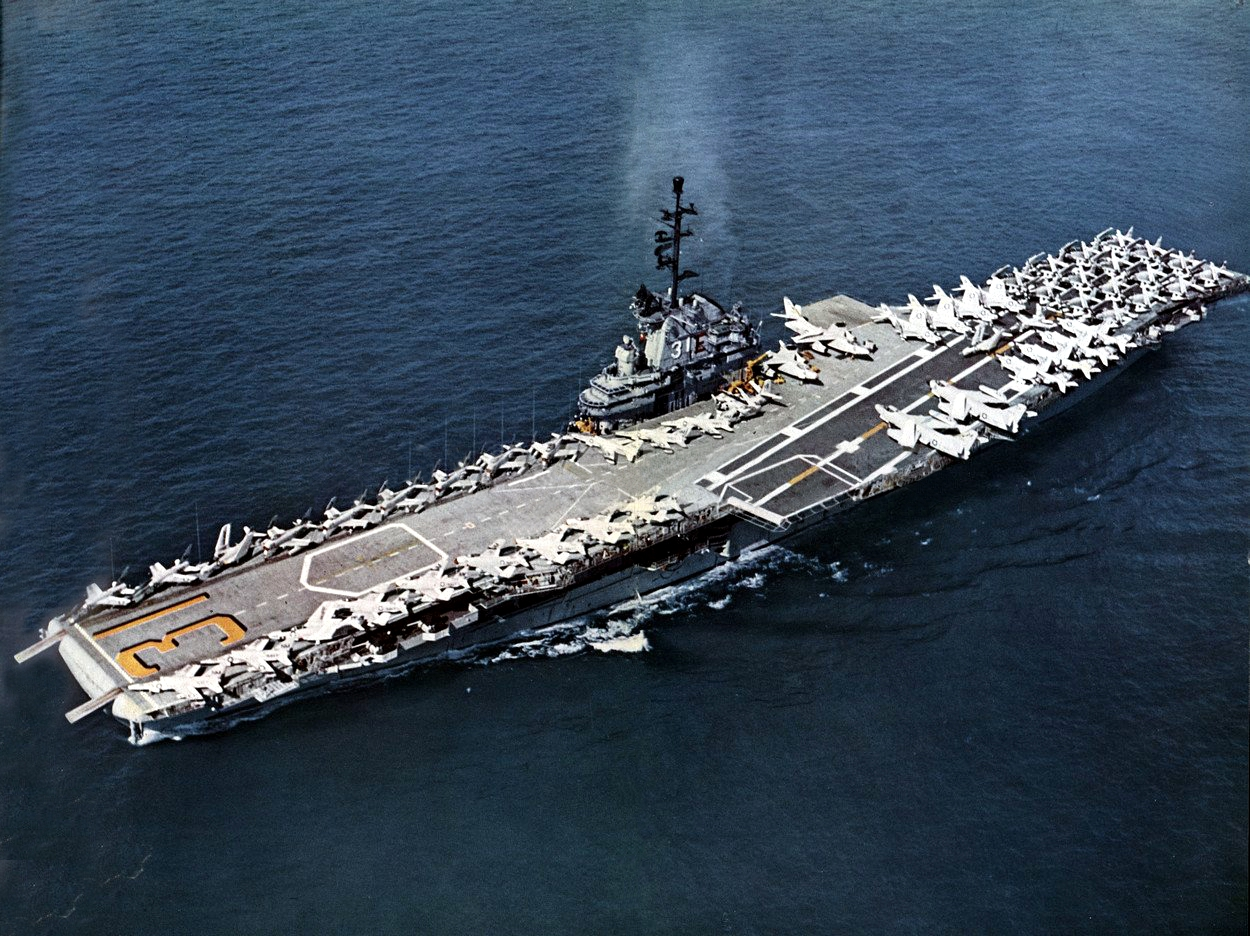
- USS Bon Homme Richard underway in 1959

History

United States
- Name: Bon Homme Richard
- Namesake: Benjamin Franklin
- Builder: New York Naval Shipyard
- Laid down: 1 February 1943
- Launched: 29 April 1944
- Commissioned: 26 November 1944
- Decommissioned: 9 January 1947
- Recommissioned: 15 January 1951
- Decommissioned: 15 May 1953
- Recommissioned: 6 September 1955
- Decommissioned: 2 July 1971
- Reclassified: CVA-31, 1 October 1952
- Stricken: 20 September 1989
- Fate: Scrapped, 1992

General characteristics
- Class & type: Essex-class aircraft carrier
- Displacement: 27,100 long tons (27,500 t) (standard); 36,380 long tons (36,960 t) (full load)
- Length: 820 feet (249.9 m) (wl); 872 feet (265.8 m) (o/a)
- Beam: 93 ft (28.3 m)
- Draft: 34 ft 2 in (10.41 m)
- Installed power: 8 × Babcock & Wilcox boilers; 150,000 shp (110,000 kW)
- Propulsion: 4 × geared steam turbines; 4 × screw propellers
- Speed: 33 knots (61 km/h; 38 mph)
- Range: 14,100 nmi (26,100 km; 16,200 mi) at 20 knots (37 km/h; 23 mph)
- Complement: 2,600 officers and enlisted men
- Armament: 12 × 5 in (127 mm) DP guns; 32 × 40 mm (1.6 in) AA guns; 46 × 20 mm (0.8 in) AA guns
- Armor: Waterline belt: 2.5–4 in (64–102 mm); Deck: 1.5 in (38 mm); Hangar deck: 2.5 in (64 mm); Bulkheads: 4 in (102 mm)
- Aircraft carried: 36 × Grumman F4F Wildcat; 36 × Douglas SBD Dauntless; 18 × Grumman TBF Avenger

USS Bon Homme Richard (CV/CVA-31) was the 14th of the 24 Essex-class aircraft carriers completed during or shortly after World War II for the United States Navy. She was the second US Navy ship to bear the name, the first one being named for John Paul Jones's famous Revolutionary War frigate by the same name. Jones had named that ship, usually rendered in more correct French as Bonhomme Richard, to honor Founding Father Benjamin Franklin, the American Commissioner at Paris, whose Poor Richard's Almanack had been published in France under the title Les Maximes du Bonhomme Richard.

Bon Homme Richard was commissioned in November 1944, the last of the Essex class completed in time to serve in what would be the final campaigns of the Pacific Theater of Operations, earning one battle star. Decommissioned shortly after the end of the war, she was recommissioned in 1951 for the Korean War. In her second career she operated exclusively in the Pacific, playing a prominent role in the Korean War, for which she earned five battle stars, and the Vietnam War. She was modernized and recommissioned in 1955. She was decommissioned in 1971, and scrapped in 1992.

== Construction and commissioning ==
Bon Homme Richard (CV-31) was laid down on 1 February 1943 at the New York Navy Yard, being the first Essex-class carrier to be built at the New York Navy Yard. (Note: The second Essex-class carrier, CV-10, was laid down as Bon Homme Richard in December 1941, but was renamed Yorktown in September 1942, following the loss of the earlier Yorktown (CV-5) in the Battle of Midway and prior to CV-10's launch in January 1943.) She was launched 29 April 1944 by Mrs. John S. McCain, wife of Vice Admiral John S. McCain Sr. The ship was commissioned 26 November 1944, with Captain A. O. Rule Jr. as her first commander.

== Service history ==
=== World War II ===
Bon Homme Richard departed Norfolk, Virginia, on 19 March 1945 to join the Pacific Fleet and arrived at Pearl Harbor on 5 April 1945. Following additional training in Hawaiian waters, the carrier joined TF 38 off Okinawa on 6 June 1945 with Carrier Air Group 91 (CVG-91) aboard. During 7–10 June she joined in the attacks on Okidaitōjima and then served with the 3rd Fleet during the air strikes against Japan from 2 July until the effective end of hostilities on 15 August. She remained off Japan until 16 September 1945 and after a short training period off Guam, proceeded to San Francisco, arriving 20 October. She left San Francisco 29 October and steamed to Pearl Harbor to undergo conversion for troop transport duty. From 8 November 1945 to 16 January 1946 she made trans-Pacific voyages, returning servicemen to the United States. She was thereafter generally inactive until decommissioning on 9 January 1947. She was mothballed at the Puget Sound Naval Shipyard, Bremerton, Washington.

=== Korean War ===
The outbreak of the Korean War on 25 June 1950 called Bon Homme Richard back to active duty. She recommissioned on 15 January 1951 in an unmodernized state and joined TF 77 off Korea on 29 May and launched the first air strikes of CVG-102 on 31 May. Bon Homme Richard continued operations with TF 77 until 20 November 1951. The carrier reached San Diego in mid-December and on 20 May 1952 was off again to the Far East, this time with CVG-7. She joined TF 77 once more on 23 June and took part in the heavy strikes against the Sui-ho Dam on 24–25 June and the amphibious feint at Kojo from 12 to 16 October. She continued operations against North Korean targets until 18 December 1952 and then steamed to San Francisco where she arrived 8 January 1953. Her classification was changed from CV-31 to CVA-31 on 1 October 1952.

==== Modernization ====
Bon Homme Richard then went out of commission on 15 May 1953 preparatory to modernization at the San Francisco Naval Shipyard. She was one of three Essex-class carriers to receive the SCB-27C and SCB-125 modernizations on one refit. Bon Homme Richard emerged from the shipyard with an angled and strengthened flight deck, enclosed "hurricane" bow, steam catapults, a new island, wider beam and many other improvements. She completed her conversion period 31 October 1955 and commenced sea trials in the Alameda-San Diego area. She was recommissioned on 6 September 1955 and began the first of a long series of 7th Fleet deployments on 16 August 1956 with CVG-21 embarked. CVG-5 reported aboard for the 1957 deployment, before CVG-19 reported aboard for the next six deployments in 1958–1959, 1959–1960, 1961, 1962–1963, 1964, and 1965–66. The 1964 cruise included a voyage into the Indian Ocean. Bon Homme Richard also had been in the Indian Ocean for a goodwill trip to Bombay, India, at the direction of President Eisenhower during the 1959-1960 Pacific cruise.

=== Vietnam War ===
Admiral George Stephen Morrison (Note: father of The Doors lead singer Jim Morrison) , flew his flag on Bon Homme Richard. Popular myth has it that he had some involvement in the Gulf of Tonkin Incident in August 1964, as he was the commander of the US naval forces present. Actually, the aircraft carrier involved in the incident was the Ticonderoga. The Vietnam War escalation in early 1965 brought Bon Homme Richard into a third armed conflict, and she deployed on five Southeast Asia combat tours over the next six years. Her aircraft battled North Vietnamese MiGs on many occasions, downing several, as well as striking transportation and infrastructure targets. Occasional excursions to other Asian areas provided some variety to her operations. Carrier Air Wing 21 (CVW-21) joined the Bon Homme Richard for the 1967 deployment to Vietnam. CVW-5 was aboard again for the last three deployments in 1968, 1969, and 1970. Bon Homme Richard was ordered inactivated at the end of her 1970 deployment. She was decommissioned on 2 July 1971, becoming part of the Reserve Fleet at Bremerton. Adm. Morrison was the keynote speaker at the Decommissioning Ceremony on 2 July 1971.

Following 20 years in mothballs, she was sold for scrap 4 February 1992. She was scrapped at Southwest Marine's yard in San Pedro, California.

== Awards ==
Bon Homme Richard received one battle star for her World War II service, and five for the Korean War. The Bon Homme Richard received three Navy Unit Citations (NUC): One NUC for actions during the Korean War; one NUC for actions during the Vietnam War in 1967 and a third NUC for actions during the Vietnam War in 1968. In 1972, however, the 1967 NUC was replaced with a Presidential Unit Citation (PUC) from President Richard M. Nixon. Therefore, the warship received a total of two NUC's and one PUC.

Navy Presidential Unit Citation	Navy Unit Commendation (twice)	Navy Meritorious Unit Commendation (twice)
American Campaign Medal	Asiatic-Pacific Campaign Medal (1 battle star)	World War II Victory Medal
Navy Occupation Service Medal (with Asia clasp)	National Defense Service Medal (twice)	Korean Service Medal (5 battle stars)
Armed Forces Expeditionary Medal (twice)	Vietnam Service Medal (10 battle stars)	Republic of Vietnam Gallantry Cross Unit Citation
United Nations Korea Medal	Republic of Vietnam Campaign Medal	Republic of Korea War Service Medal (retroactive)

== Gallery ==
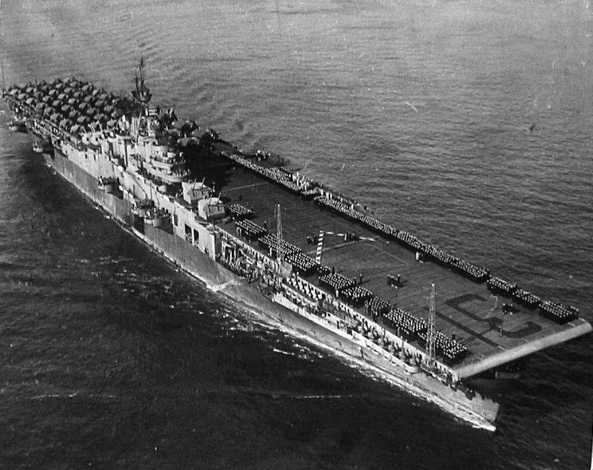
Bon Homme Richard underway at sea on 20 October 1945

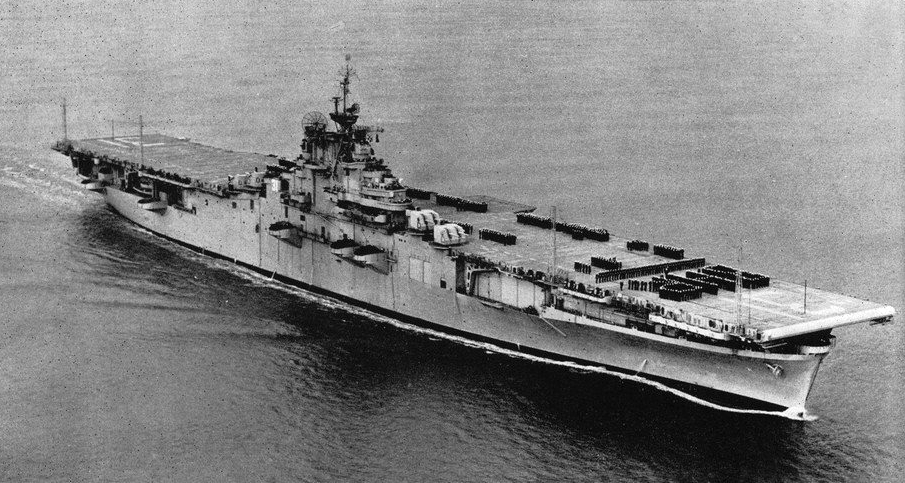
Bon Homme Richard after recommissioning in 1951

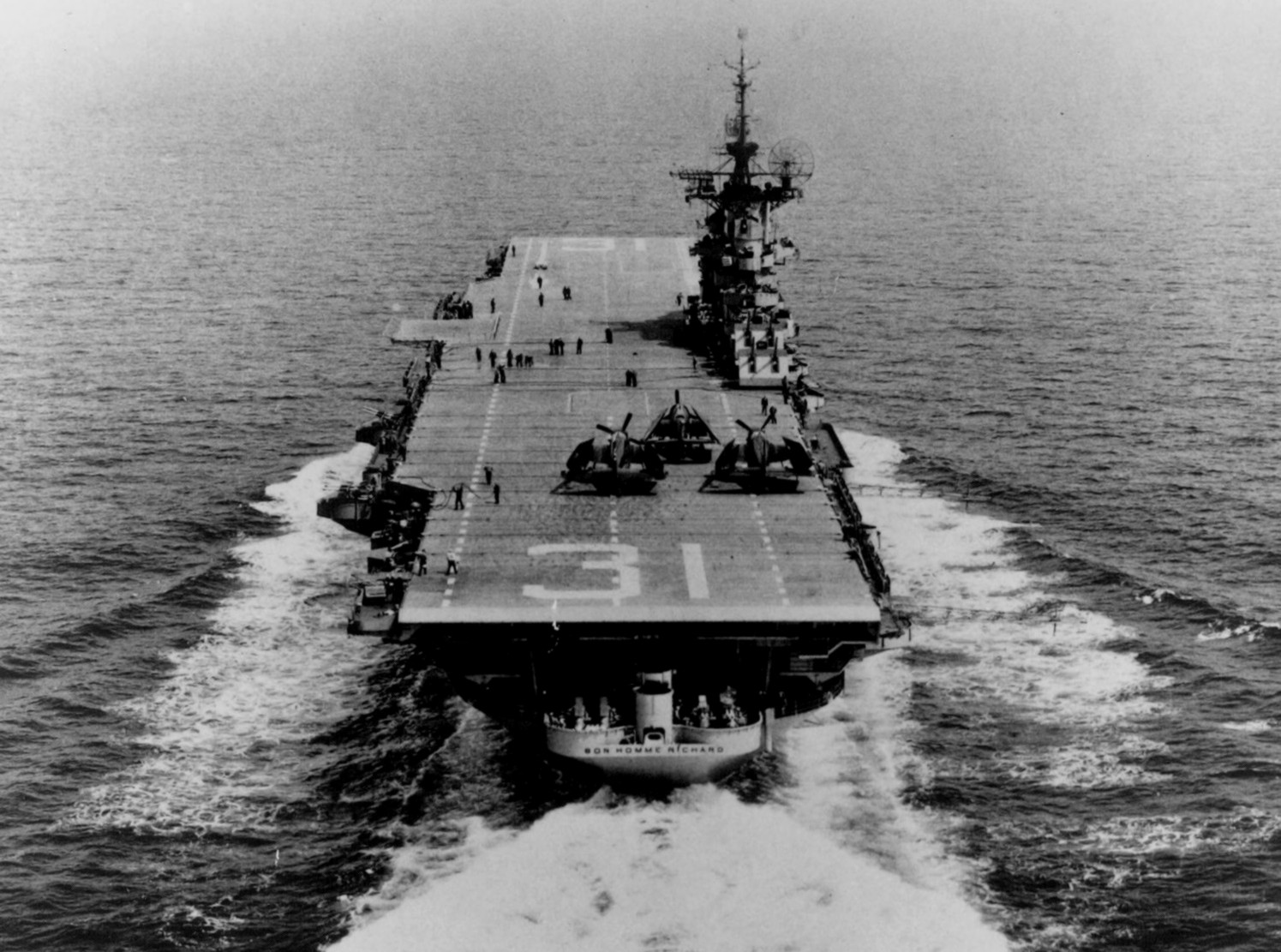
Bon Homme Richard's stern view 1952

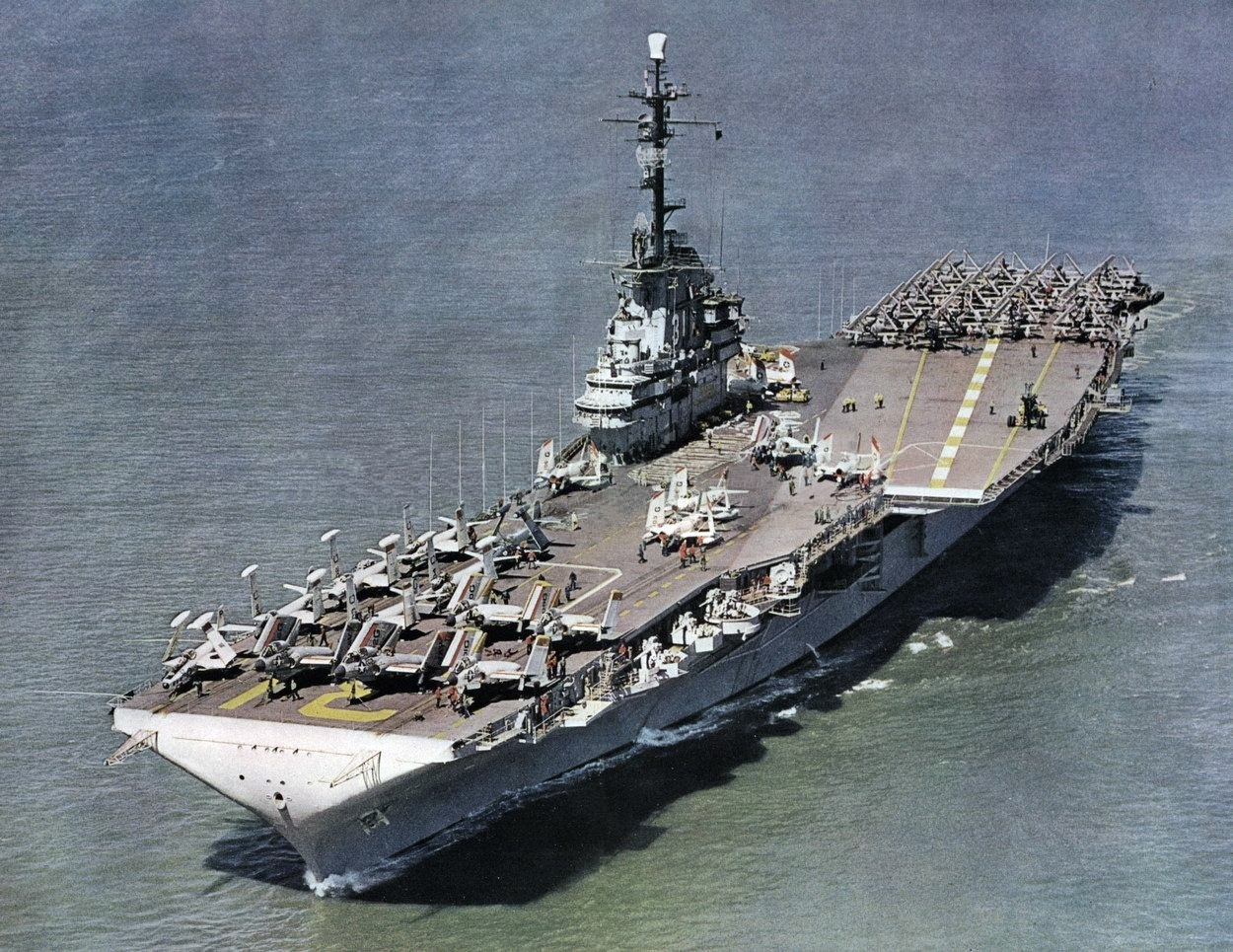
Bon Homme Richard underway in 1956

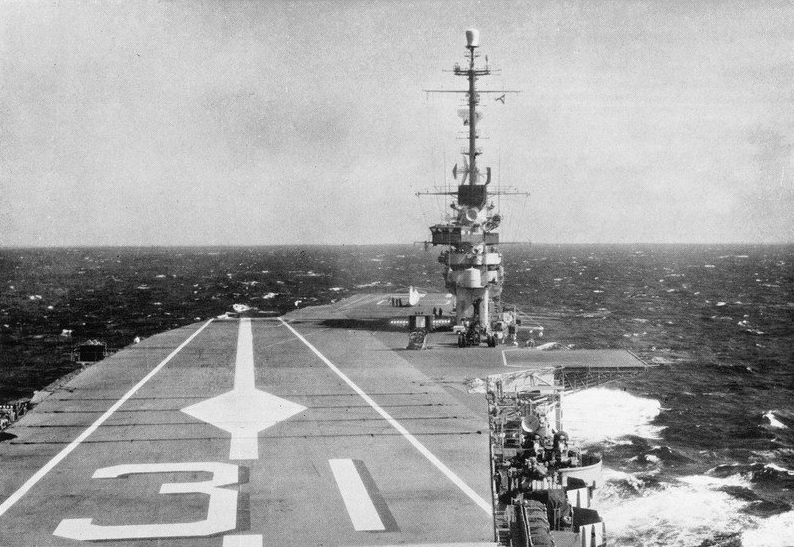
Aft view of flight deck of Bon Homme Richard in 1957

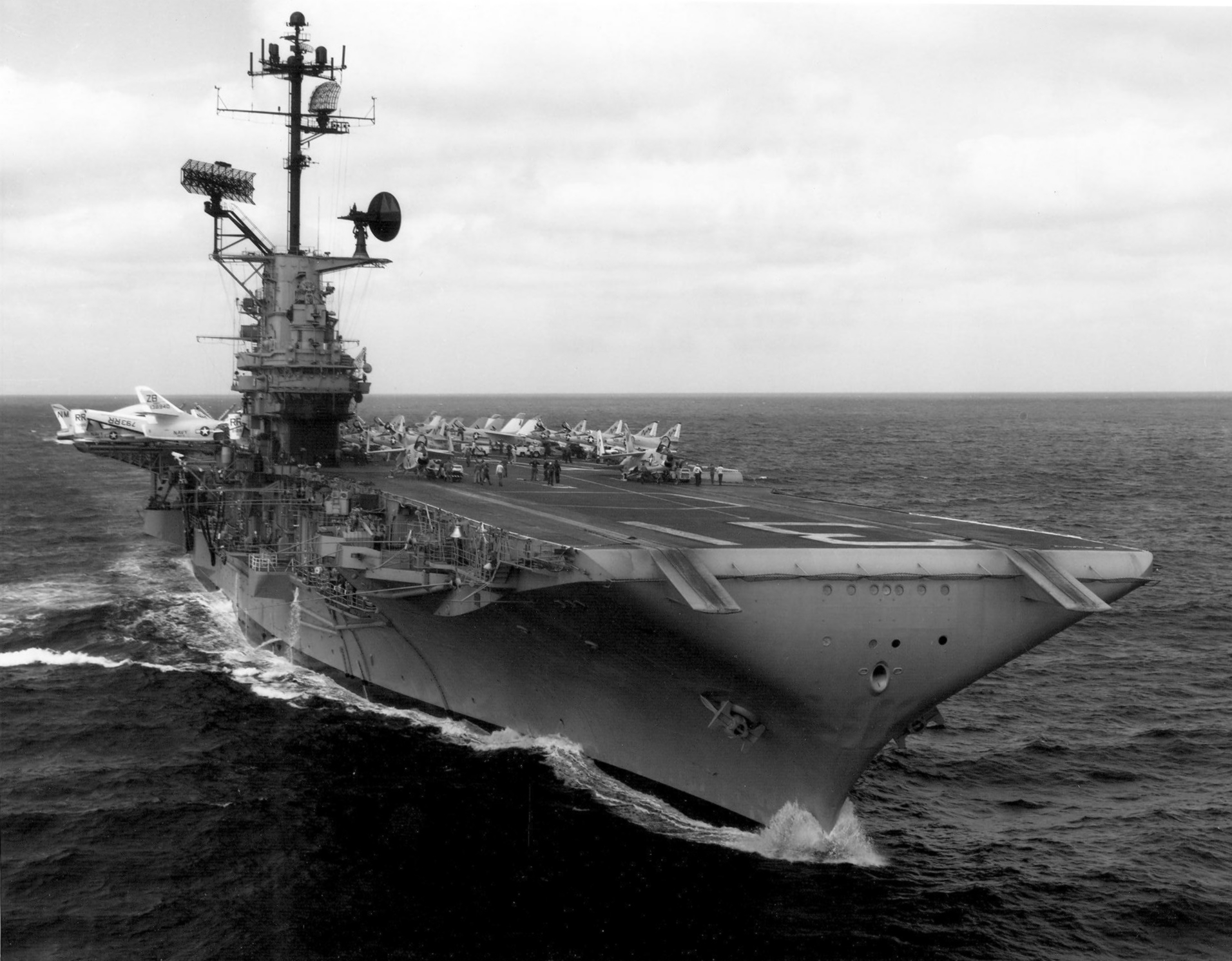
Bon Homme Richard underway in the Gulf of Tonkin on 2 November 1964

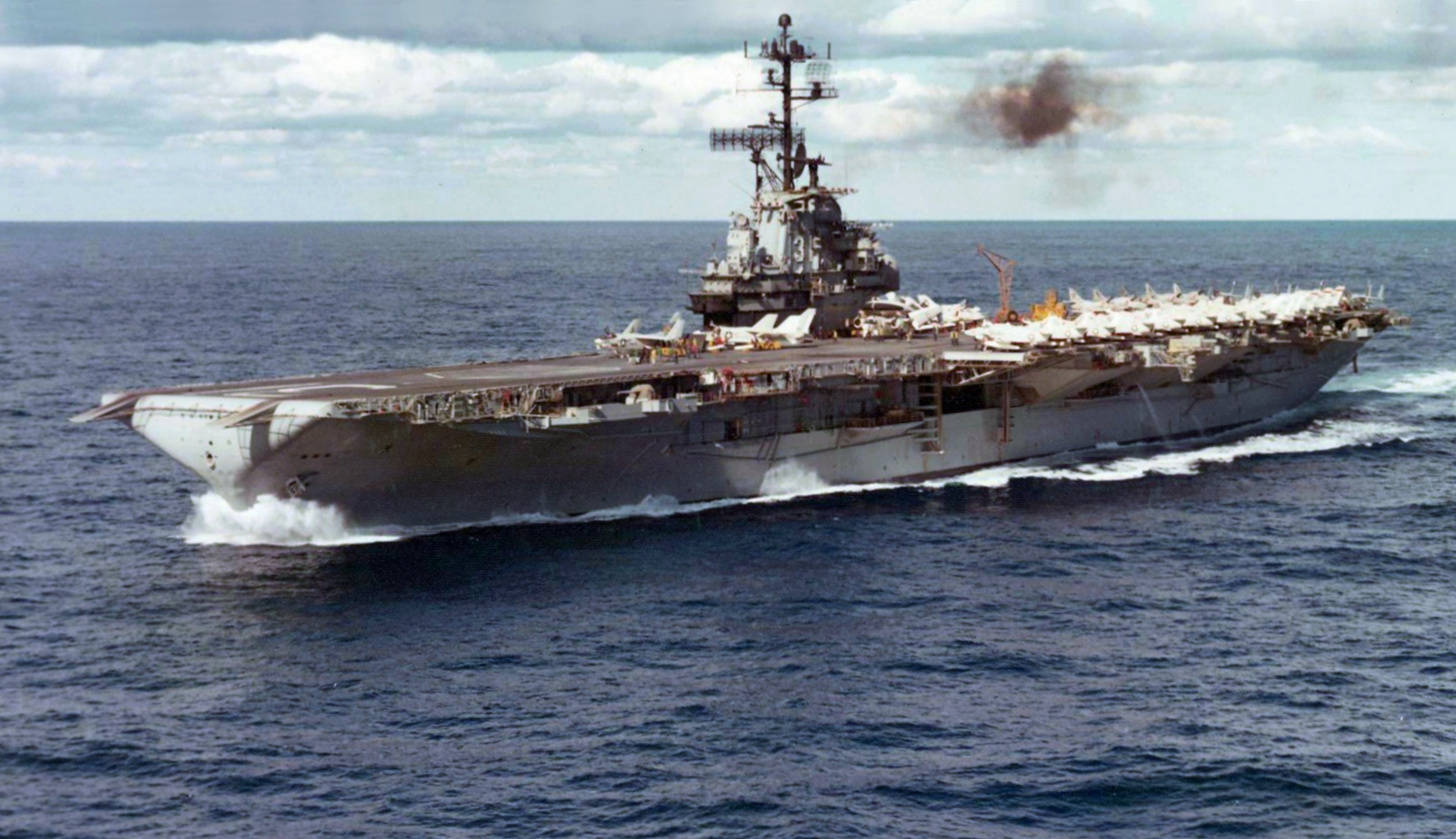
Bon Homme Richard underway in mid-1960s

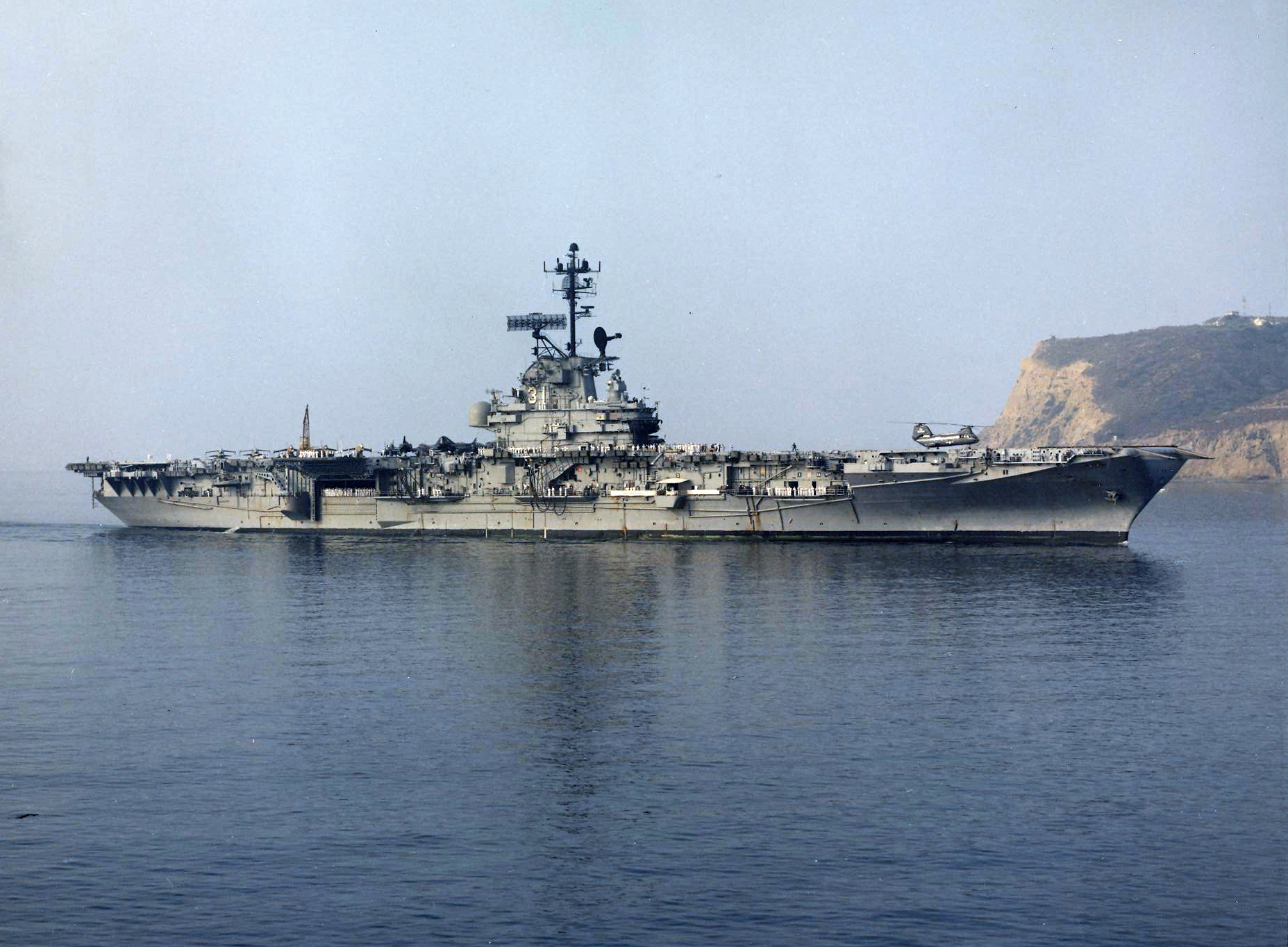
Bon Homme Richard off Point Loma 1968
