= George Stephen Morrison =

American admiral (1919–2008)

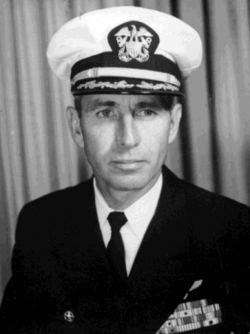
- Born: January 7, 1919; Rome, Georgia, U.S.
- Died: November 17, 2008 (aged 89); Coronado, California, U.S.
- Spouse: Clara Virginia Clarke (m. 1942; died 2005)
- Children: 3, including Jim
- Military career
- Allegiance: United States
- Branch: United States Navy
- Service years: 1941–1975
- Rank: Rear admiral
- Nickname: Steve
- Commands: Naval Forces Marianas; USS Bon Homme Richard
- Conflicts: World War II: Battle of Pearl Harbor; Korean War; Vietnam War
- Awards: Navy Distinguished Service Medal; Legion of Merit (2); Bronze Star Medal

George Stephen Morrison (January 7, 1919 – November 17, 2008) was a United States Navy rear admiral (upper half) and naval aviator. Morrison held significant commands of United States naval forces during the Vietnam War. He was the father of Jim Morrison, the lead singer of the Doors.

== Early life and education ==
Born January 7, 1919, in Rome, Georgia, Morrison was the son of Caroline (née Hoover 1891–1984) and Paul Raymund Morrison (1886–1971), and raised in Leesburg, Florida. The Morrison family descended from Scottish settlers who emigrated to America in the late 18th century. Morrison used to claim that his family was originally from the Outer Hebrides, and claimed direct descent from Robert the Bruce. The family had also Irish ancestry, with roots tracing back to County Cork.

Morrison entered the U.S. Naval Academy in 1938, graduated in 1941, and was commissioned an ensign. Sent to Hawaii, he joined the crew of the destroyer USS Pruitt. On December 7, 1941, Morrison witnessed the Japanese attack on Pearl Harbor.

== Career ==
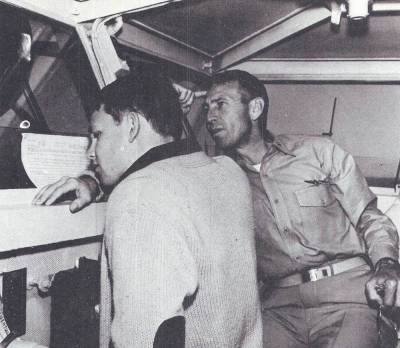
Captain Morrison and his son Jim on the bridge of the Bon Homme Richard in January 1964

Morrison began flight training in 1943 at Naval Air Station Pensacola, Florida, and graduated in spring 1944, and went on to fly combat missions in the Grumman F6F Hellcat. He flew missions in the Pacific Theater for the duration of World War II. He served as an instructor on nuclear weapons programs following the end of the war, while during the Korean War, he served at the joint operations center in Seoul. This resulted in the award of the Bronze Star Medal with "V" for Valor device.

On November 22, 1963, Morrison took command of the Essex-class aircraft carrier USS Bon Homme Richard, flagship of the First Fleet's Fifth Carrier Division in the Pacific, based at San Diego, California. His first act as the new skipper was to announce the death of President John F. Kennedy. The Fifth Carrier Division was transferred to the Seventh Fleet when sent to the Western Pacific, early in 1964. Popular myth has it that he commanded U.S. naval forces in the Gulf of Tonkin in August 1964. In fact, his ship, Bon Homme Richard, was in Japanese waters (Sasebo–Yokosuka transit) on 2–4 August. The carrier involved was Ticonderoga, under RADM Robert B. Moore.

In 1967, Morrison was promoted to rear admiral. In WestPac in 1968, he commanded a Task Group that was part of Task Force 77, commanded by Vice Admiral Ralph Cousins; the USS Hancock served as his flagship. Besides operations against communist forces in North Vietnam, the task force was diverted to Korea in December 1968 to support South Korean forces battling North Korean infiltrators during the Korean DMZ Conflict. He successfully led the Task Force in the interdiction of communist North Korean forces in spite of attempts by Soviet Navy destroyers to prevent flight operations by attempting to cross the path of the Hancock. In 1972, he was appointed Commander Naval Forces Marianas. As such, he was in charge of relief efforts for Vietnamese refugees sent to Guam, after the fall of Saigon in the spring of 1975.

Morrison was the keynote speaker at the decommissioning ceremony for the carrier Bon Homme Richard, on July 2, 1971, in Washington D.C. His estranged son, rock musician Jim Morrison, died in Paris at age 27, the following day.

Morrison retired from the Navy in August 1975, as a rear admiral (upper half).

== Personal life and retirement ==
Morrison met and married Clara Virginia Clarke (1919–2005) in Hawaii in 1942. Their son Jim Morrison, later became lead singer of rock band The Doors. His other children were a son and a daughter.

In retirement, the Morrisons lived in Coronado and Chula Vista, California. Clara Clarke Morrison died after a long illness in Coronado on December 29, 2005. Morrison died in Coronado on November 17, 2008, at the age of 89. His private memorial service was held on November 24 at Fort Rosecrans National Cemetery in San Diego. His ashes were scattered at sea near the same spot off Point Loma where his wife's ashes had been scattered nearly three years earlier.

== Awards and decorations ==
Morrison was a recipient of the following military decorations and service medals:

Badge	Naval Aviator insignia		
1st Row	Navy Distinguished Service Medal	Legion of Merit with star	Bronze Star Medal with "V" device
2nd Row	Air Medal with two stars	Presidential Unit Citation	American Defense Service Medal
3rd Row	American Campaign Medal	Asiatic-Pacific Campaign Medal with three stars	European-African-Middle Eastern Campaign Medal
4th Row	World War II Victory Medal	National Defense Service Medal with one star	Korean Service Medal
5th Row	Armed Forces Expeditionary Medal	Korea Presidential Unit Citation	United Nations Service Medal
