= The American Night =

1st edition (publ. Villard)

The American Night is a volume of poetry written by Jim Morrison, front-man for the 1960s psychedelic rock group the Doors, and published posthumously in 1991, 20 years after his death (to the month) by Random House under the trade name imprint Villard Publishing. The book is structured into 10 sections. The title is eponymous with a poem that appears on the album An American Prayer, itself a collection of spoken word and musical vignettes released in 1978.

The American Night is a follow-up and second volume to Wilderness: The Lost Writings of Jim Morrison (first published in 1988). The book consists of his theories on night which the publisher describes as containing "nightmarish images, bold associative leaps, and [a] volcanic power of emotion" and being "the unmistakable artifacts of a great, wild voice and heart."

== Influences ==
Morrison's work is often compared to that of French poet Arthur Rimbaud, specifically from his Illuminations collection. Morrison once wrote in a letter to the translator of Rimbaud's collection, "Thanks for doing the Rimbaud translation. I read French but not too easily and I needed your translation. I am a rock singer and your book travels with me wherever I go."

Not only did Morrison read Rimbaud passionately, but his work seems to be inspired by him. Both poets entertain nontraditional formats for their poetry, Rimbaud implementing the prose style while Morrison often played around with space in The American Night. They both stray from normal rhythm and verse. Their shared defiance of societal norms and desires to be known to the world as poets shines through in their defiant structure and tone. Both authors wrote consistently of death in a way that questioned the living, and both bring mythology as well as concepts of life after death into their poetry.

== Controversy ==
The American Night has remained controversial because of the way it was published. When Morrison was discovered dead in a Paris hotel room in 1971, the writings that would later become this publication were found along with him. While there seem to have been no directions from Morrison that the writings he left behind were meant for publication, there was a longtime race to ensure the work was seen by the public. Morrison's longtime companion and common-law wife Pamela Courson was one of the first to attempt to publish Morrison's works, and though she died before she was successful, her family looked to do the same, as their daughter had been named Morrison's sole heir shortly after her own death. Copies of Morrison's manuscripts, however, reportedly fell into the hands of a few fans who also looked to publish the poetry. When those fans would eventually resolve those publishing rights, Courson's family were able to publish Wilderness, and The American Night.

At the same time, questions arose as to whether it was ethical to publish Morrison's works after his death when he gave no indication that this was his intention. A friend of Morrison's was quoted as saying, "If something was thrown in a wastebasket by Cezanne, I don't think it should hang in a museum ... What about the sanctity of the writer?" The two collections were also published under the name "Jim Morrison" as opposed to the name Morrison usually gave his publisher, "James Douglas Morrison". When asked why the books were placed in a store in the music section rather than with the poetry, a storeowner admitted that "[t]hey sell better."

== See also ==
- A Tribute to Jim Morrison
