= List of Delta Tau Delta members =

This is a list of notable members of Delta Tau Delta fraternity.

== Academia ==
- Hank Brown, president of the University of Colorado, and president of the University of Northern Colorado, and United States Senate,
- Joseph Campbell, professor of literature at Sarah Lawrence College who worked in comparative mythology and comparative religion
- Ralph Cicerone, chancellor of the University of California, Irvine and president of National Academy of Sciences
- Charles Lincoln Edwards, zoologist and professor at the University of Cincinnati, Trinity College, and the University of Southern California
- Kent Hance, Chancellor of the Texas Tech University System, United States House of Representatives, and Railroad Commissioner of Texas
- Alexander Crombie Humphreys, second president of Stevens Institute of Technology
- Martin C. Jischke, president of Purdue University
- William Keach, professor of English literature at Brown University and Rutgers University, Rhodes Scholar
- Jay Keasling, professor of chemical engineering and bioengineering at the University of California, Berkeley and 2006 Discover magazine Scientist of the Year
- William Kirwan, chancellor of the University of Maryland System
- Peter Likins, former president of the University of Arizona
- Joseph Rallo, president of Angelo State University
- Michael Shonrock, former president of Lindenwood University
- William Tate, dean of men at the University of Georgia from 1946 until 1971
- James Tobin, economist who taught at Harvard and Yale Universities.

== Art ==
- Alexander Calder, sculptor and artist
- Don King, photographer and cinematographer
- Bob Wilson, cartoonist, artist, and author of children's books

== Business ==
- Lawrence Babbio Jr., former vice chairman and president of Verizon
- John Arrillaga, billionaire real estate developer and philanthropist who was one of the largest landowners in Silicon Valley
- Tim Boyle, president of Columbia Sportswear
- J. Michael Cook, former chairman and CEO of Deloitte
- Vic Edelbrock Jr., CEO and president of Edelbrock
- Richard T. Farmer, founder of Cintas
- Tom Gegax, entrepreneur, author, angel investor, and philanthropist
- Thomas Hoegh, investor and entrepreneur
- Henry Juszkiewicz, CEO of Gibson Guitar
- Jack Laughery, chairman of Hardee's Restaurants
- John W. Lieb, electrical engineer for the Edison Electric Light Company
- Tarek Mansour, co-founder of Kalshi
- Chris Meek, co-founder & chairman of SoldierStrong
- John V. Roach, CEO of Tandy Corporation
- Jeff Stibel, CEO of Dun & Bradstreet Credibility Corp
- Fred C. Tucker, owner and CEO of the F.C. Tucker Company known for leading development and revitalization efforts in downtown Indianapolis
- Ronald Tutor, chairman and chief executive officer (CEO) of Tutor Perini, and president of the Tutor Perini
- Myron E. Ullman, JCPenney CEO
- John van Hengel, America's Second Harvest Food Bank founder
- Rick Wagoner, former CEO of General Motors
- Edward Whitacre Jr., former chairman of General Motors and former CEO of SBC
- Peter Woo, chairman of The Wharf (Holdings)

== Entertainment ==
- Dan Abrams, ABC-TV reporter
- Duane Allen vocalist with the Oak Ridge Boys
- Keith Anderson, country singer
- Robert Armstrong, actor
- Greg Berlanti, writer and producer
- Andrew Breitbart, political commentator
- Peter Buck lead guitarist, R.E.M.
- Drew Carey, actor, host, and comedian
- Chip Chinery, actor and comedian
- Fielder Cook, film director
- Carter Covington, writer and producer
- John Denver, Grammy award-winning musician
- Bob Dotson, NBC-TV reporter
- Bill Fagerbakke, actor
- Will Ferrell, actor
- Frederic Forrest, actor
- Stephen Gaghan, director and screenwriter
- David Gates lead vocalist for the band Bread
- Bill Hemmer, host of America's Newsroom
- Joel Higgins, actor
- Eddie Ifft, comedian
- Jeremy Iversen, actor and author
- Roy Jenson, actor
- Aron Kincaid, actor
- Craig Klein, co-founder of Bonerama
- Jim Lemley, film producer
- Thad Luckinbill, actor
- James Marsden, actor
- Matthew McConaughey, actor
- Mark McGrath singer with Sugar Ray
- Chummy MacGregor jazz musician
- Austin Miller, actor
- Roger Mudd, television journalist and broadcaster
- Jim Nabors, actor
- Jack O'Brien, Tony Award-winning director
- Ed O'Neill, actor
- David Payne, chief meteorologist for CBS affiliate KWTV-DT
- Eddie Reeves singer, songwriter, and record executive
- David Schwimmer, actor
- Johnny Sheffield, actor
- Al Staehely Singer
- Peter Stuart singer with Dog's Eye View
- David Sullivan, actor
- John Summit, DJ and producer
- Dalton Trumbo, screenwriter
- Nicolas "Nic" Vansteenberghe, Love Island USA runner-up

== Law ==
=== Attorney ===
- Melvin Belli, attorney
- William F. Buckley Sr., lawyer and oil developer
- Ramsey Clark, US Attorney General
- Tyrone C. Fahner, 37th Attorney General of Illinois
- William Lerach, disbarred lawyer who specialized in private Securities Class Action lawsuits

=== Judicial ===
- Carlos Bea, judge with the United States Court of Appeals for the Ninth Circuit
- Adam Beeler, justice of the Washington Supreme Court
- William J. Brennan Jr., justice of the Supreme Court of the United States
- Tom C. Clark, justice of the Supreme Court of the United States
- George MacKinnon, circuit judge of the United States Court of Appeals for the District of Columbia, United States House of Representatives, and United States Attorney for Minnesota
- Henry Mentz, district judge of the United States District Court for the Eastern District of Louisiana.Thomas G. Nelson, United States circuit judge of the United States Court of Appeals for the Ninth Circuit
- John Virgil Singleton Jr., United States district judge of the United States District Court for the Southern District of Texas
- Sam Sparks, senior United States district judge of the United States District Court for the Western District of Texas
- Carl V. Weygandt, Chief Justice of the Ohio Supreme Court

=== Enforcement ===
- A. Bruce Bielaski, director of the Federal Bureau of Investigation
- Dominic Choi, Chief of the Los Angeles Police Department
- Tim McCarthy, United States Secret Service agent shot while protecting President Ronald Reagan in 1981

== Literature and journalism ==
- Will Carleton, poet
- Max Ehrmann, writer, poet, and attorney
- Winston Groom, novelist and author of Forrest Gump
- Marcus Luttrell, Navy SEAL and author of the book Lone Survivor
- John D. MacDonald, novelist
- Willie Morris, Harper's editor and author
- Richard North Patterson, author
- Quentin Reynolds, journalist and World War II war correspondent
- Willard Straight, The New Republic founder

== Military ==
- Mahlon Apgar IV, Assistant Secretary of the Army for Installations, Energy and Environment
- Archibald Butt, military advisor to Presidents Theodore Roosevelt and William Howard Taft, victim of Titanic's sinking
- Scott Carpenter, naval officer, aviator, aeronautical engineer, and a Mercury Seven astronaut
- Ken Mattingly, rear admiral in the United States Navy and astronaut who orbited the Moon on Apollo 16 and flew two Space Shuttle missions
- Ralph T. O'Neil, National Commander of the American Legion
- Marcus Luttrell, former United States Navy SEAL, Petty Officer First Class, and the only survivor of Operation Red Wings during the War in Afghanistan

== Politics ==
=== United States Vice Presidents ===
- Alben Barkley (1949–1953)
- Henry Agard Wallace (1941–1945)

=== United States Congress ===
- Joseph L. Bristow, United States Senate and Assistant United States Postmaster General
- Champ Clark, Speaker of the House United States House of Representatives
- Christopher Cox, United States House of Representatives
- Kent Hance, Chancellor of the Texas Tech University System, United States House of Representatives, and Railroad Commissioner of Texas
- William E. Jenner, United States Sentate
- Tim Johnson, United States Sentate, United States House of Representatives, South Dakota Senate, and South Dakota House of Representatives
- George LeMieux, United States Sentate and Deputy Florida Attorney General
- Morgan Luttrell, United States House of Representatives
- James Robert Mann, United States House of Representatives
- Henry L. Muldrow, United States House of Representatives, First Assistant Secretary of the Interior, Mississippi House of Representatives
- Don Pease, United States House of Representatives, Ohio Senate, and Ohio House of Representatives
- Harley Rouda, United States House of Representatives
- Paul Ryan, Speaker of the House United States House of Representatives
- Tim Ryan, United States House of Representatives and Ohio Senate
- Ed Whitfield, United States House of Representatives and Kentucky House of Representatives
- Rob Wittman, United States House of Representatives and Virginia House of Delegates

=== Governors ===
- Greg Abbott, Governor of Texas
- Henry J. Allen, Governor of Kansas and United States Sentate
- Reubin Askew, Governor of Florida
- Raymond E. Baldwin, Governor of Connecticut and United States Sentate
- Steve Beshear, Governor of Kentucky
- James J. Blanchard, Governor of Michigan
- Tom Carper, Governor of Delaware, United States Sentate, U.S. House of Representatives, and Treasurer of Delaware
- Ernie Fletcher, Governor of Kentucky, United States House of Representatives, and Kentucky House of Representatives
- Greg Gianforte, Governor of Montana
- Brad Henry, Governor of Oklahoma
- Bruce Johnson, Lieutenant Governor of Ohio
- Adam McMullen, Governor of Nebraska
- Bill Richardson, Governor of New Mexico and U.S. Secretary of Energy
- Arthur J. Weaver, Governor of Nebraska

=== State and local officials ===
- Greg Ballard, mayor of Indianapolis, Indiana
- Adam Edelen, Kentucky State Auditor
- Allen Thomson Gunnell, Colorado Senate and Colorado House of Representatives
- Jeff Habay, Pennsylvania House of Representatives
- Morris S. Halliday, New York State Senate and head football coach at Hamilton College
- Todd Hollenbach, Kentucky State Treasurer
- Jacob Henry Miller, president of the Ohio State Senate
- Michael Sessions, mayor of Hillsdale, Michigan
- Curtis P. Smith, mayor of Dallas, Texas
- Bill Sublette, Florida House of Representatives
- Charles H. Varnum, Michigan House of Representatives
- George M. Wallhauser Jr, chairman of the New Jersey Highway Authority
- Jesse J. White, Pennsylvania House of Representatives
- Joseph Canino, Connecticut House of Representatives

=== Other ===
- Marlin Fitzwater, White House Press Secretary
- James Jerome, Canadian Speaker of the House of Commons
- Nelson T. Johnson, U.S. Ambassador to China and US Ambassador to Australia
- Steve Schmidt, campaign strategist for George W. Bush, Arnold Schwarzenegger, and John McCain
- John W. Snow, US Secretary of the Treasury and former CEO of CSX Corporation
- Tommy Holstein, Democratic Primary Candidate Missouri House District 3

== Religion ==
- Peter Beckwith Anglican bishop
- Alfred A. Gilman, Episcopal bishop of the Missionary District of Hankow and president of Boone University
- Frank Juhan, fourth bishop of the Episcopal Diocese of Florida
- Marshall Russell Reed, bishop of The Methodist Church and the United Methodist Church

== Sports ==
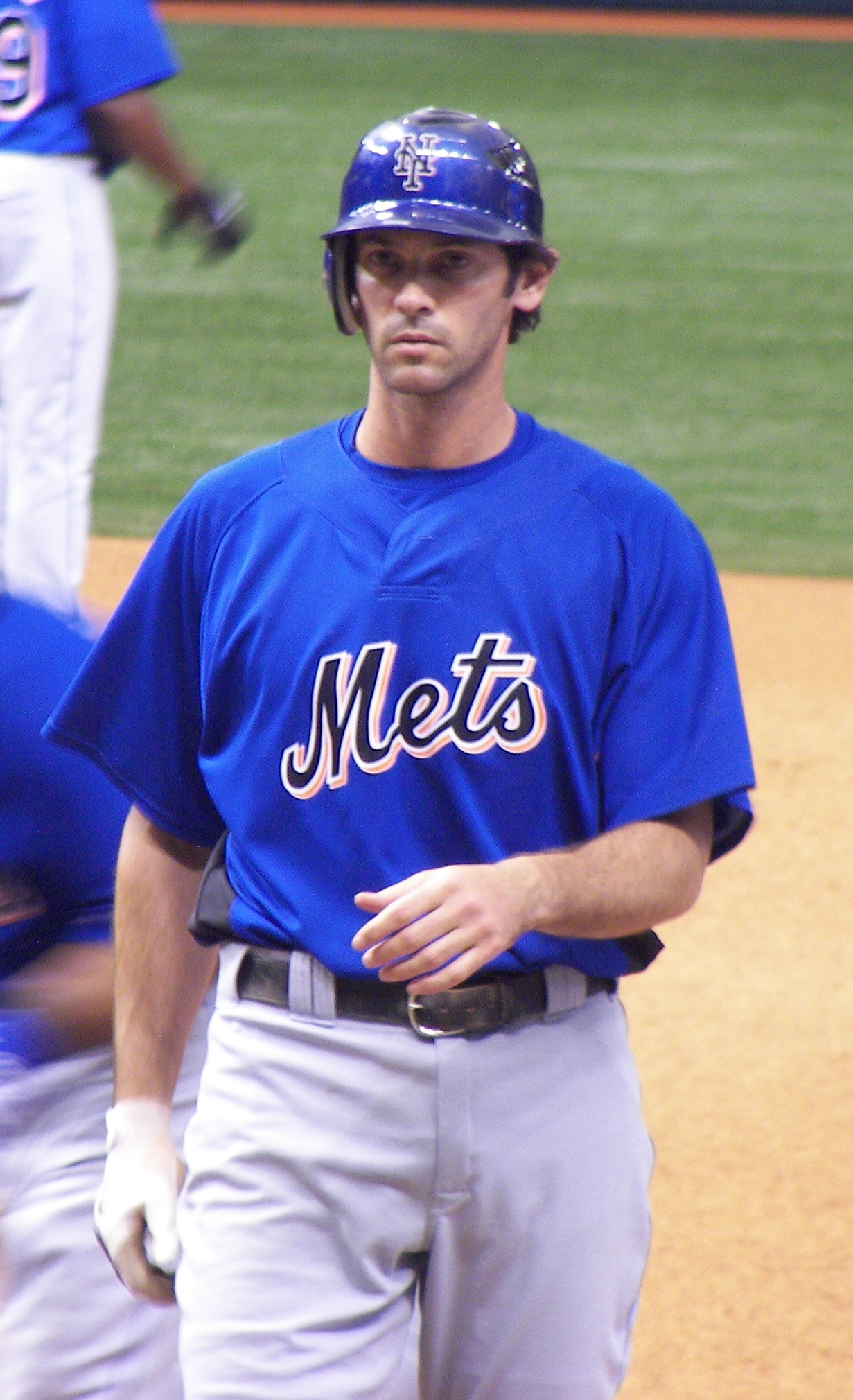
Shawn Green

=== Baseball ===
- Mike Aldrete, first base coach for the Oakland Athletics of Major League Baseball
- Jim Andrews, Major League Baseball player
- Buddy Bell, manager in Major League Baseball and vice president and senior advisor to the general manager for the Cincinnati Reds
- Steve Buechele, current front office executive for the Texas Rangers
- Joe Conzelman, pitcher for the Pittsburgh Pirates
- Shawn Green, Major League Baseball two-time All-Star right fielder
- Rick Helling, special assistant to the head of the Major League Baseball Players Association
- A. J. Hinch, Houston Astros manager and World Series champion in 2017
- Chad Hutchinson, pitcher for the St. Louis Cardinals and professional football player for the Dallas Cowboys and Chicago Bears
- Mark Marquess, head baseball coach at Stanford University
- Dave McCarty, former first baseman and outfielder in Major League Baseball
- Jake Miller, Major League Baseball pitcher
- Russ Miller, Major League Baseball pitcher
- Mike Mussina, Major League Baseball player for the Baltimore Orioles and the New York Yankees
- Branch Rickey, instrumental in breaking Major League Baseball's color barrier by signing black player Jackie Robinson, created the framework for the modern minor league farm system, and introduced the batting helmet
- Branch Rickey III, president of the Pacific Coast League
- Eppa Rixey, best known as the National League's leader in career victories for a left-hander with 266 wins
- Bo Schultz, former professional baseball pitcher
- George Sisler, elected to the National Baseball Hall of Fame in 1939
- Ed Sprague, only player ever to win the College World Series, an Olympic championship, and the World Series
- Drew Storen, former professional baseball relief pitcher

=== Basketball ===
- Mike Bratz, professional basketball player and former the assistant general manager for the Sacramento Kings
- Pete Carril, former basketball coach at Princeton University
- E. R. Cowell, head basketball coach at Ottawa University and football coach at Sterling College
- Scott Drew, head basketball coach of Baylor University
- Rich Falk, former coach of the Northwestern Wildcats and associate commissioner of the Big Ten Conference
- Buck Harris, guard for the Virginia Cavaliers of the University of Virginia, won the 1900 championship and made the All-Southern Team in 1901
- Zach Kleiman, General manager of the Memphis Grizzlies, and won the NBA Executive of the Year Award 2021–2022
- Ward Lambert, head basketball coach at Purdue University
- Bobby Leonard, inducted into the Naismith Memorial Basketball Hall of Fame as a coach in 2014
- Ray Mears winningest basketball coach in University of Tennessee history
- Stretch Murphy, college and professional basketball player inducted into the Basketball Hall of Fame in 1960
- Ed Nealy, professional basketball player who won the NBA championship in 1993 as a member of the Chicago Bulls
- Andy Phillip, professional basketball player elected to the Naismith Memorial Basketball Hall of Fame in 1961
- Mike Phillips, professional basketball player
- Rick Robey, college and professional basketball player
- Justin Zanik, the general manager of the Utah Jazz

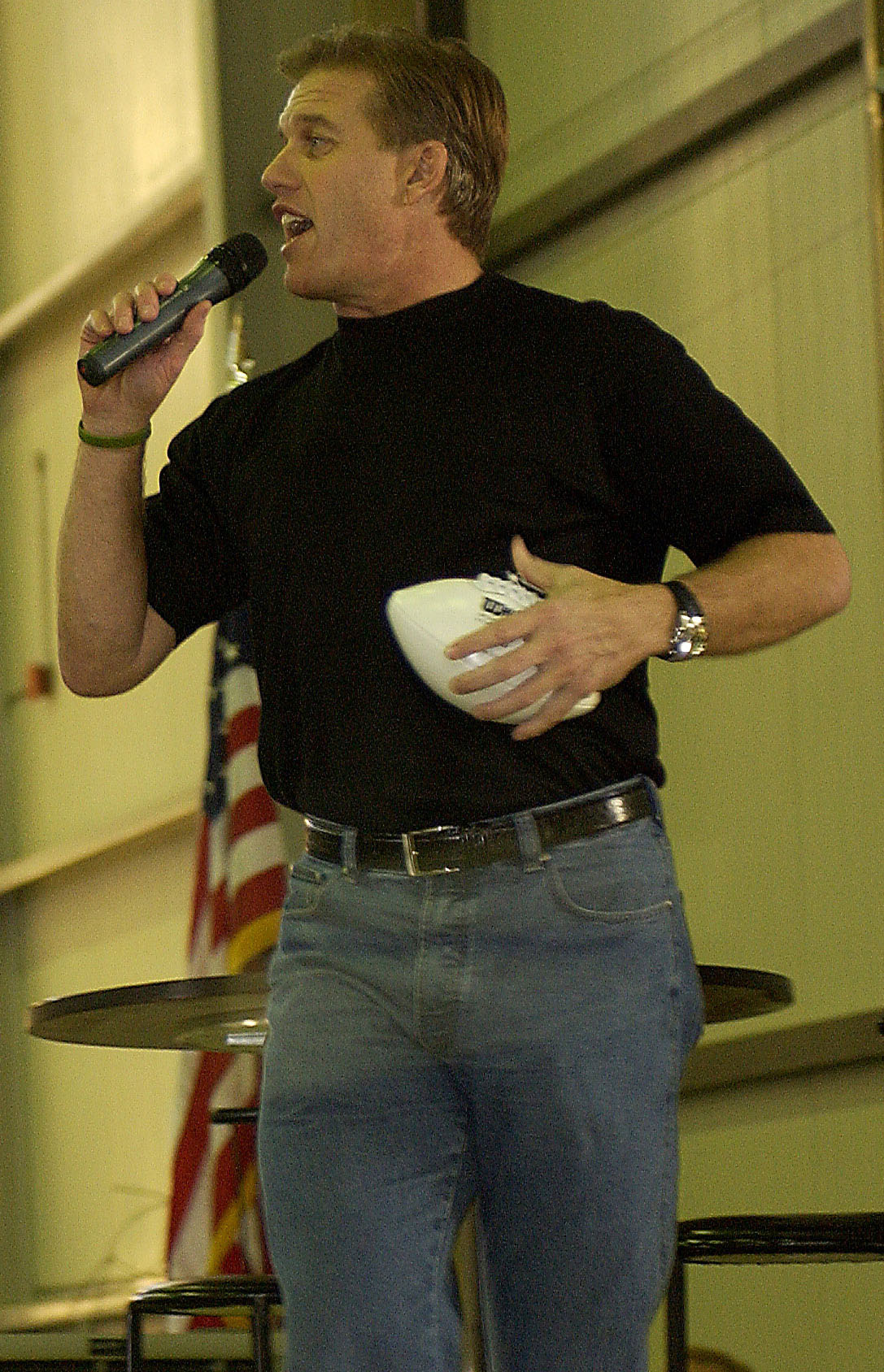
John Elway

=== Football ===
- Joe Avezzano, head football coach at Oregon State University and assistant coach with the Dallas Cowboys and Oakland Raiders
- Enoch Brown, college football player
- Randy Bullock, college and professional football player
- William Caley, University of Colorado Boulder record holder and member of the undefeated 1898 Michigan Wolverines football team
- Carmen Cozza, head football coach at Yale University
- Irby Curry, All-Southern quarterback shot down over French skies in World War I
- Chris Dalman, former San Francisco 49ers offensive lineman and later offensive line coach
- Boyd Dowler, professional football player with the Green Bay Packers and Washington Redskins.
- Pos Elam, college football player
- John Elway, professional football quarterback and general manager with the Denver Broncos
- Jason Fisk, professional football plaery
- George W. Gregory, starting center for the University of Michigan's football team, winning 3 national championships
- Cale Gundy, assistant coach at the University of Oklahoma
- Dick Hartley, college football player
- Les Horvath, college football player who won the Heisman Trophy playing for the Ohio State Buckeyes
- J. W. Knibbs, head football coach at the University of California, Berkeley
- Dante Lavelli, professional football end for the Cleveland Browns
- Tuffy Leemans, professional football player with the New York Giants
- Erik Lorig, professional football player with the Tampa Bay Buccaneers and New Orleans Saints
- John Lynch, professional football player and the general manager of the San Francisco 49ers
- Owen Marecic, professional football player with the Cleveland Browns
- Herb McCracken, head football coach at Allegheny College
- Tot McCullough, college football and baseball player
- Howard Mudd, professional football player with the San Francisco 49ers and Chicago Bears and coachat the University of California
- Jess Neely, winningest football coach in Rice University and member of College Football Hall of Fame
- Kent Nix, professional football player
- Jim Parady, football coach at Marist College
- Jim Plunkett, professional football player with the Las Vegas Raiders
- Milton C. Portmann professional football played in the Ohio League
- Tavita Pritchard, quarterback coach for the Washington Commanders
- Jon Ritchie, professional football fullback and current sports radio host
- Greg Van Roten, professional football player for the New York Giants
- Mark Rypien, professional football player with the Washington Redskins named Super Bowl MVP
- Alfred Sharp, college football players
- Jeff Siemon professional football player with the Minnesota Vikings
- Billy Joe Tolliver, professional football player in the National Football League and Canadian Football League
- Stein Stone, head football coach of Clemson University
- Jeff Voris, football coach at Butler University
- Gene Washington, professional football player with the San Francisco 49ers and the Detroit Lions
- Dave Wyman, professional football player with the Seattle Seahawks and Denver Broncos

=== Horse racing ===
- Samuel S. Brown, Thoroughbred racehorse owner, breeder, and racetrack owner.
- John W. Galbreath, racehorse owner, breeder, and founder of Darby Dan Farm
- Bob Lewis, businessman who owned a number of champion Thoroughbred racehorses
- John T. Ward Jr., racehorse trainer.

=== Swimming and water polo ===
- Bob Bennett, competition swimmer, Olympic medalist, and former world record-holder
- Charles E. Collett, US Olympics 1924 water polo team and bronze medalist
- Ludy Langer, Olympic swimmer
- Lance Larson, Olympic swimmer
- Roy Saari, swimmer and water polo Olympic medalist

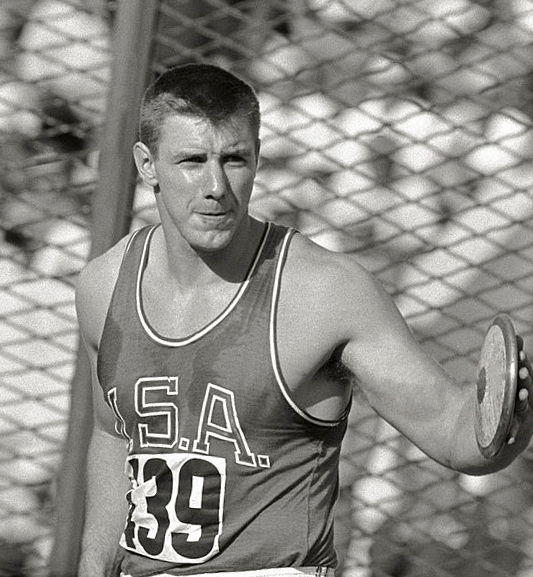
Al Oerter

=== Other sports ===
- Andy Banachowski, women's volleyball coach at UCLA
- Bruce Barnes, high-ranking professional tennis player of the 1930s
- Scott Dunlap, American professional golfer
- Todd Martin, American tennis player
- Mark Mendelblatt, yachtsman
- David Mitchell, figure skater
- Al Oerter, four-time Olympic Champion in discus throw
- Kyle Rote Jr., professional soccer player

=== Sportscasters ===
- Tony Barnhart, college football insider for CBS Sports
- Steve Bunin, former ESPN Anchor
- Bill Flemming, television sports journalist and announcers for Wide World of Sports
- Bill Macatee, sports broadcaster for CBS Sports and Tennis Channel
- Jon Miller, sportscaster for Major League Baseball and play-by-play announcer for the San Francisco Giants
- Pat O'Brien, sportscaster with CBS Sports, anchor and host of Access Hollywood and The Insider
- Jay Randolph, sportscaster
- Craig Sager, sports reporter for CNN, TBS, and TNT
