= Starting Now =

Starting Now may refer to:

== Music ==
=== Albums ===
- Starting Now (Chuck Wicks album), a 2008 country music album, the debut album by Chuck Wicks
- Starting Now (Toad the Wet Sprocket album), a 2021 rock album, the 7th studio album by Toad the Wet Sprocket

=== Songs ===
- "Starting Now!" (Jim Morrison song), an unreleased song by Jim Morrison later bootlegged on The Lost Paris Tapes
- "Starting Now" (Johnny Hartman song), a 1977 song by Johnny Hartman off the album Johnny Hartman, Johnny Hartman
- "Starting Now" (Testify song), a 2001 single by Testify off the album Keep Walking; see Testify (Christian band)
- "Starting Now" (Ingrid Michaelson song), a 2006 song by Ingrid Michaelson off the album Girls and Boys (album)
- "Starting Now" (Chuck Wicks song), a 2008 song by Chuck Wicks, the title track off the eponymous debut album Starting Now (Chuck Wicks album)
- "Starting Now" (Chinese: 現在開始; pinyin: Xian Zai Kai Shi), a 2011 song by Biung Wang, from the soundtrack album In Time with You
- "Starting Now" (Tay Kewei song), a 2013 single by Tay Kewei
- "Starting Now!" (Nana Mizuki song), a 2016 single by Nana Mizuki off the album Neogene Creation; see Nana Mizuki discography
- "Starting Now" (Brandy song), a 2021 non-album single by Brandy; see Brandy discography
- "Simulan (Starting Now)", a 2021 single by Maris Racal
- "Starting Now" (Toad the Wet Sprocket song), a 2021 song by Toad the Wet Sprocket, the title track off the eponymous album Starting Now (Toad the Wet Sprocket album)

== Other uses ==
- "starting now" (Barry), a 2022 TV episode of Barry
- "Starting Now" (pilot), a 1989 TV pilot directed by Hal Cooper (director) released as a TV movie
- Starting Now (film), a 1951 film produced by Coronet Films; see List of 'Coronet Films' films

== See also ==
- Starting Here, Starting Now (stage musical), a 1976 musical revue
- "Starting Here, Starting Now" (song), a 1966 song by Barbra Streisand from the album Color Me Barbra
- START Now! (organization), a U.S. nonprofit
- Starting From Now (disambiguation)
- Don't Start Now (disambiguation)
