= Don't Start Now (disambiguation) =

"Don't Start Now" is a 2019 song by Dua Lipa.

Don't Start Now may also refer to:

- "Don't Start Now" (BoA song), a 2002 single by BoA from the eponymous album
- Jumping into the World (album), a 2001 album by BoA, also released as Don't Start Now

== See also ==
- START Now! (organization), a U.S. nonprofit
- Starting Now (disambiguation)
