= SoldierSanta =

- Founded: 2009
- Type: Non-governmental organization
- Location: Stamford, Connecticut, USA
- Website: http://www.soldiersanta.com

SoldierSanta is a 501(c)(3) non-profit organization that supports United States soldiers deployed in Iraq and Afghanistan by shipping holiday gifts during the Christmas and holiday season.

== History ==
In 2009, Financial Services Executive Chris Meek formed the non-profit organization Soldiersocks in response to a July 2009 letter from Sergeant Major Like Converse who requested help in obtaining socks and baby wipes for his Marines serving in Afghanistan. Upon receipt of this letter, Chris soon formed a 501(c)(3) to help raise funds and gather basic supplies for the troops. As SoldierSocks grew, it expanded its reach in the fall of 2010 to include a new initiative with a similar objective. The group created SoldierSanta in an effort to send gifts to the troops for them to open during the holiday season. Corporate sponsors such as Sports Illustrated Magazine, Cablevision, Conair Corporation, Borders, and Connecticut-based Newman’s Own all joined to lend a hand in this new program. The number of corporate and business sponsors continues to grow and so too does the organizations reach. Relying on contributions and gift donations, SoldierSanta sends gifts such as an iPod or DVD to American troops in an effort to make the holiday season special.
