= Martha MacCallum =

American news host and anchor (born 1964)

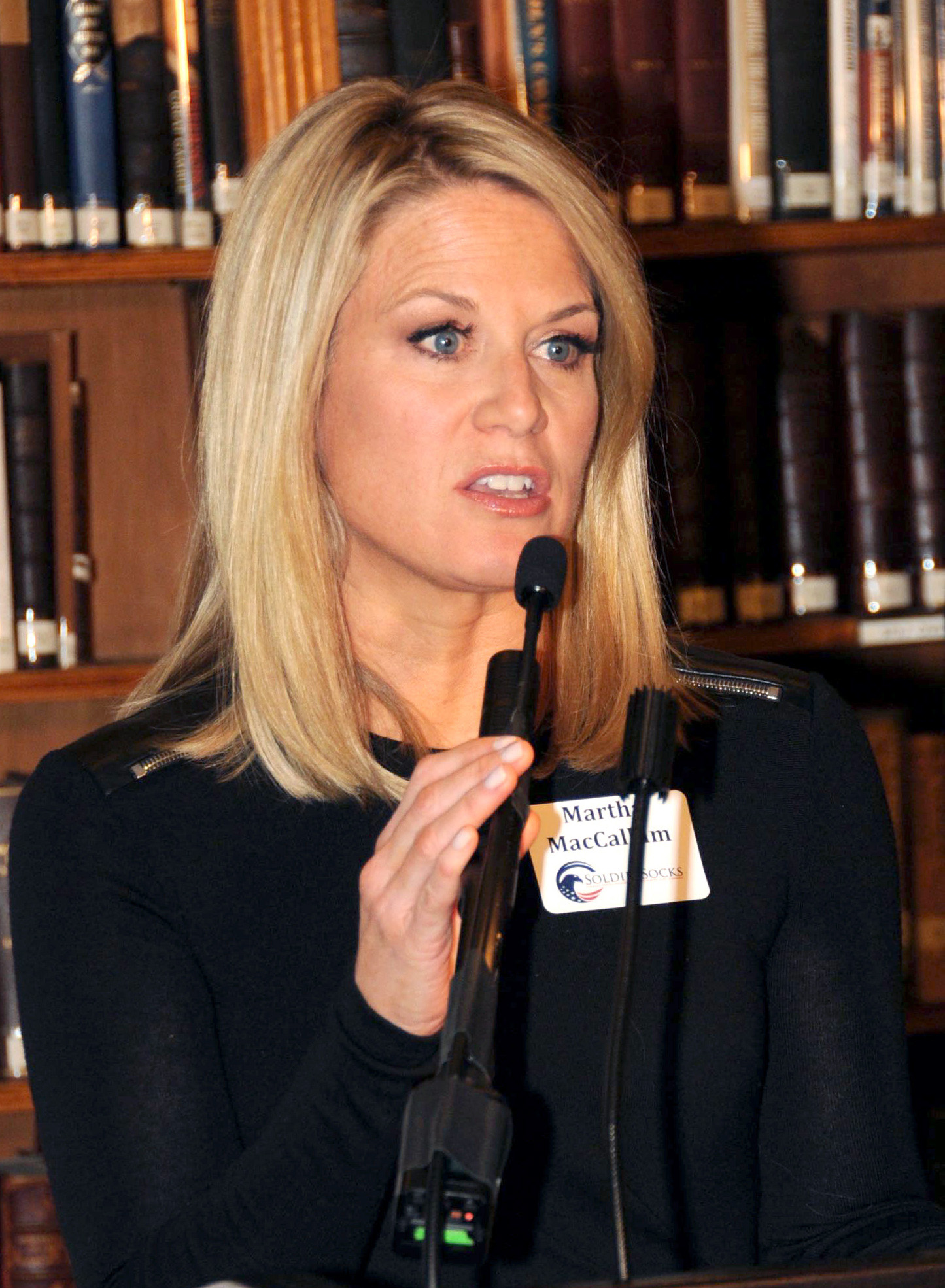
- MacCallum in 2014
- Born: January 31, 1964 (age 62)
- Education: St. Lawrence University (BA); Circle in the Square Theatre School (GrDip)
- Occupations: Anchor and Executive Editor, The Story with Martha MacCallum (Fox News Channel)
- Employer: Fox News
- Spouse: Daniel Gregory (m. 1992)
- Children: 3

Martha Bowes MacCallum (born January 31, 1964) is a conservative American journalist and news anchor for Fox News. She is the executive editor and anchor of The Story with Martha MacCallum, broadcast from Manhattan Monday through Friday at 3PM ET, and co-anchor of Fox News Election coverage. MacCallum joined the network in 2004 and is based in New York City. Her interviews with President Donald Trump, President Barack Obama, First Lady Laura Bush, Supreme Court Justice Brett Kavanaugh and others have been featured on her programs.

== Early life ==
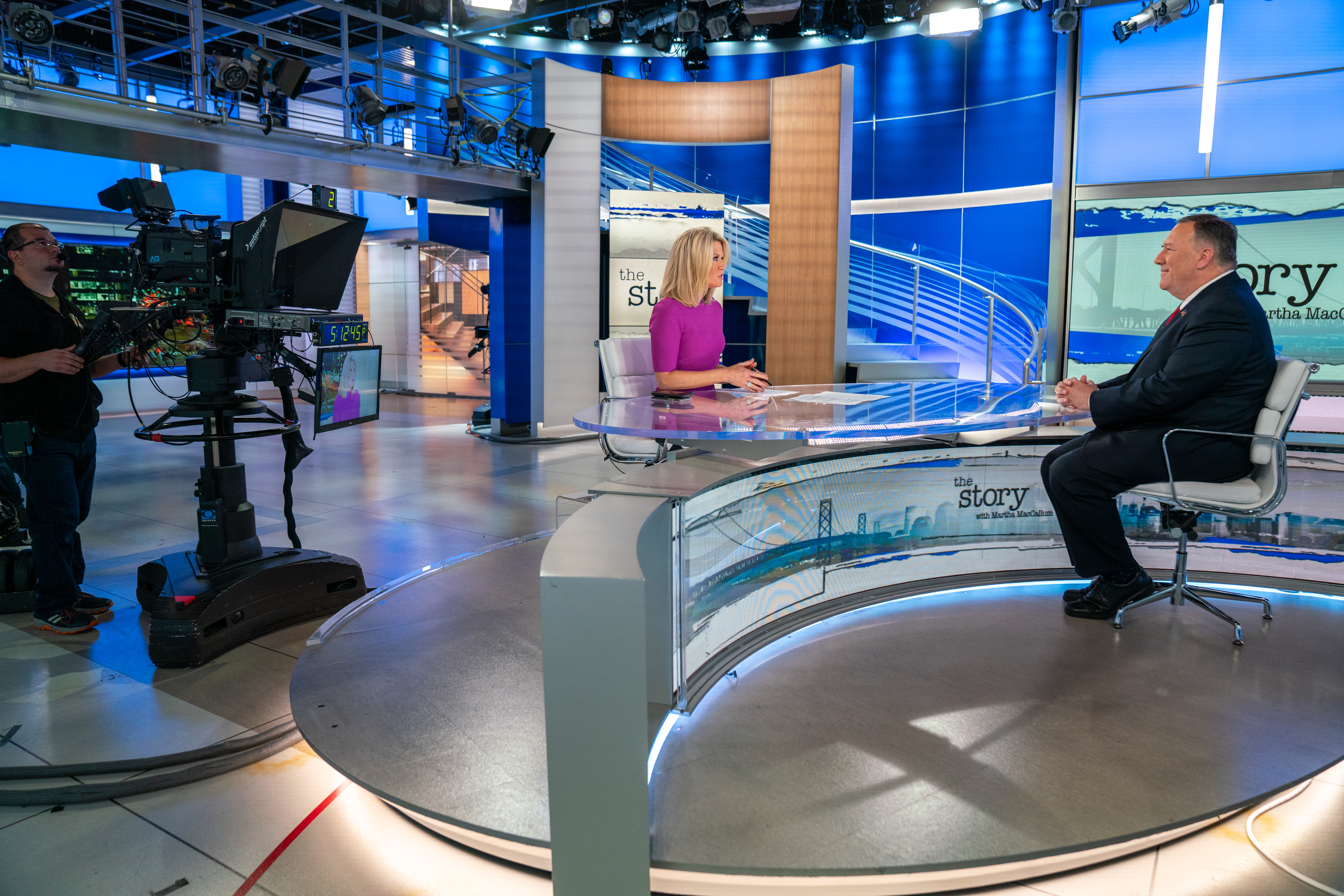
MacCallum interviewing Secretary of State Mike Pompeo in October 2019

Martha MacCallum, the daughter of Elizabeth B. and Douglas C. MacCallum Jr., grew up in Wyckoff, New Jersey. After graduating from Ramapo High School in Franklin Lakes, New Jersey, MacCallum earned her bachelor's degree in political science from St. Lawrence University in the North Country of New York State, and subsequently studied at the Circle in the Square Theatre School on Broadway, founding the Miranda Theater Company in New York. MacCallum next worked as an associate in corporate relations at Dow Jones & Company. She began her career as a freelance researcher for Corporate Finance magazine, but the publication was sold soon after she joined.

== Broadcasting career ==
=== Wall Street Journal Television ===
MacCallum was at Wall Street Journal Television from 1991 to 1996, where she served as a business news correspondent and anchor for The Wall Street Journal Report, World Market Outlook, and Business USA.

In 1996, she moved to WBIS-TV, a short-lived sports and business station in New York, as an anchor and reporter.

=== CNBC ===
MacCallum was next a reporter/anchor for NBC/CNBC from 1997 to 2003. She frequently contributed to The News with Brian Williams, Today, NBC affiliate news programs, and CNBC World before being assigned to co-anchor CNBC's Morning Call with Martha MacCallum and Ted David. She also appeared on Checkpoint, an evening show which examined homeland security and the war on terror. MacCallum created the series "Inside the Business" for Business Center, a former CNBC show.

=== Fox News ===
MacCallum joined the Fox News Channel in 2004. She hosted The Live Desk from 2006 to 2010 and America's Newsroom from 2010 to 2017. MacCallum hosted the new program, The First 100 Days, on Fox News Channel, which debuted January 9, 2017. The program averaged 3.5 million viewers in the first month, an increase of 79 percent in the time slot compared to the year before. On April 28, 2017, the show was rebranded as The Story with Martha MacCallum. At the close of 2020, "The Story" was moved from the prime 7 p.m. ET time-slot to the 3 p.m. ET time-slot.

In addition to hosting The Story, MacCallum serves as a fill in host on programs such as America's Newsroom, The Faulkner Focus, Outnumbered, and The Five.

MacCallum has hosted two series about WWII streaming on Fox Nation. In 2023, MacCallum hosted The Final Journey of the Greatest Generation, a two-season, six-episode series about heroes of WWII taking viewers on one last journey through their personal experiences fighting against the Axis powers in Europe and the Pacific. In 2022, MacCallum began hosting The Secret History of World War II with untold stories about heroes from WWII, with three seasons and eleven episodes.

In January 2019, MacCallum launched “The Untold Story with Martha MacCallum,” a twice-weekly podcast where she sits down with a major newsmaker sharing inspiring stories of positivity, perseverance, and more.

In 2018, MacCallum had the first and only interview with then-Supreme Court nominee Brett Kavanaugh and his wife, Ashley Estes Kavanaugh. The interview aired on The Story With Martha MacCallum on September 24, 2018 at 7 PM ET and was watched by 3.6 million viewers, cable news' most-watched program of the night. According to The Hollywood Reporter, MacCallum earned "near-universal praise" for her interview of Kavanaugh.

In July 2023, Fox News announced that MacCallum interviewed Buster Murdaugh, the last living son of Alex Murdaugh, who was convicted of murdering his wife Maggie Murdaugh and son Paul in June 2021. She presented the interview in a seven-episode Fox Nation series entitled The Fall of the House of Murdaugh, covering the twists in the double homicide case with exclusive interviews, prison audio, and never-before-seen family video & photographs.

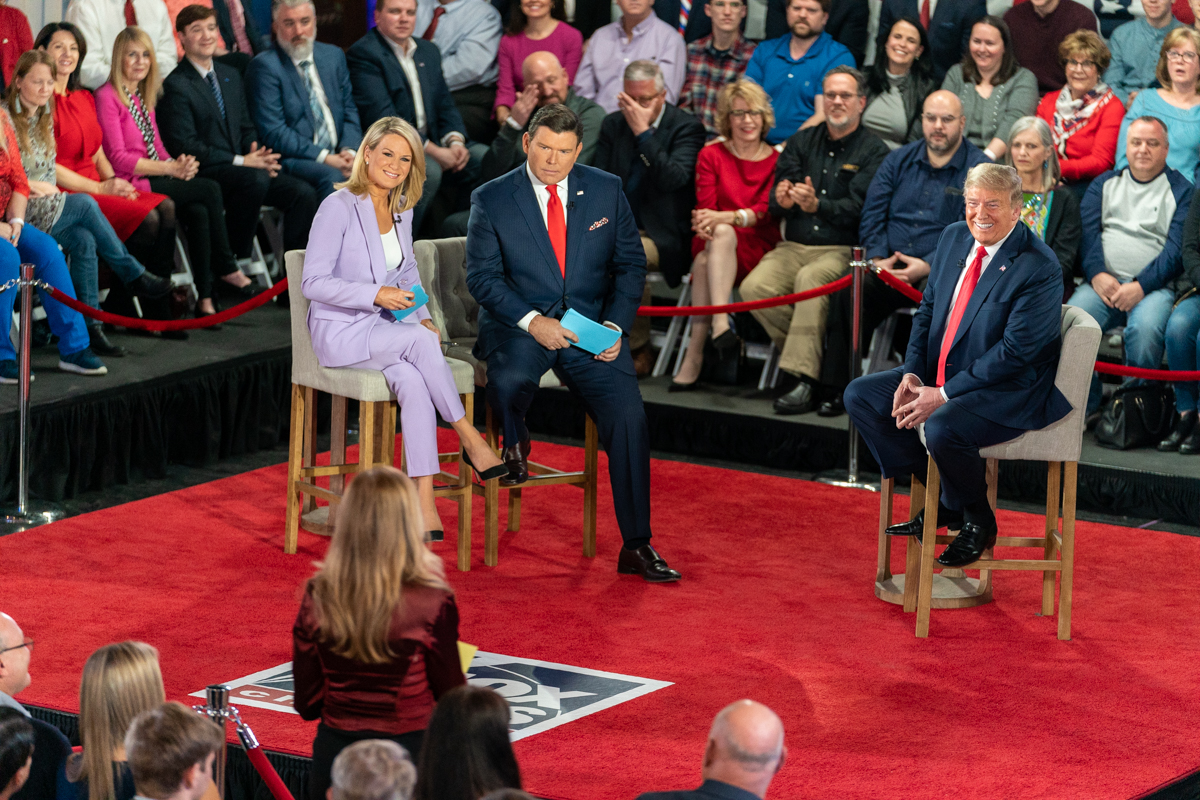
MacCallum and Bret Baier moderate a town hall with President Donald Trump in 2020

After a mob of Trump supporters stormed the Capitol, MacCallum initially said, “This is a huge victory for these protesters. They have disrupted the system in an enormous way!” Later on during coverage of the events she called them "unsettling" and stated that "control has to be maintained." She likened the storming of the U.S. Capitol to a peaceful protest outside Josh Hawley's home a few days earlier; The New York Times said it was "bizarre" to link "swarms of Trump supporters breaking into the seat of democracy, an event that made worldwide news, to a small-scale incident at the home of a Republican official."

==== Debates and Town Halls ====
MacCallum co-moderated her first debate on Fox News at the Third Undercard Republican Primary Debate on January 28, 2016, with Bill Hemmer from the Iowa Events Center in Des Moines, Iowa. Participating in the debate was Carly Fiorina, Mike Huckabee, Rick Santorum and Jim Gilmore.

In 2019, MacCallum and Bret Baier moderated numerous town halls with potential presidential candidates in advance of the 2020 election. Howard Schultz, former Starbucks CEO, was first in the series on April 4, 2019, from Kansas City, Missouri. Next in the series was Bernie Sanders on April 15, 2019, from the ArtsQuest Center at SteelStacks in Bethlehem, Pennsylvania. On May 8, 2019, MacCallum and Baier hosted Amy Klobuchar for a town hall in Milwaukee, Wisconsin and Julián Castro on June 13, 2019, from Tempe Center for the Arts, Tempe, Arizona.

MacCallum and Bret Baier hosted Donald Trump's first TV town hall of the 2020 election cycle at the Scranton Cultural Center in Scranton, Pennsylvania on March 5, 2020, one of the last in-person political events before COVID-19 lockdowns in 2020. MacCallum and Baier also co-anchored a virtual town hall with Donald Trump on May 3, 2020, from the Lincoln Memorial.

During the 2022 midterm election, MacCallum and Bret Baier moderated a town hall with Ohio Senate hopefuls Republican JD Vance and Democrat Tim Ryan, one week before Election Day. The event was held in Columbus, Ohio on November 1, 2022.

Martha MacCallum moderated the first Republican debate of the 2024 election season with Bret Baier at the Fiserv Forum in Milwaukee, Wisconsin on August 24, 2023. In attendance was Ron DeSantis, Nikki Haley, Tim Scott, Chris Christie, Vivek Ramaswamy, Mike Pence, Doug Burgum, and Asa Hutchinson. Former President Donald Trump declined to participate.

In January 2024, MacCallum co-moderated with Brett Baier three back-to-back town halls featuring Donald Trump, Ron DeSantis and Nikki Haley. Donald Trump, in his first live appearance on Fox News since 2022, appeared in a town hall on January 10, 2024, from Des Moines, Iowa, days before the Iowa Caucus. Ron DeSantis appeared on January 9, 2019, and Nikki Haley on January 8, 2024.

== Awards ==
In 2024, MacCallum received the John R. "Tex" McCrary Award for Excellence in Journalism from the Congressional Medal of Honor Society for her work covering the military. MacCallum is a two-time recipient of the Gracie Award for Women in Journalism in 1997 and 2003, and has received the Soldiersocks / SoldierStrong Commitment To Serve award.

== Book ==
In 2020, assisted by Ronald J. Drez, she published a book titled Unknown Valor: A Story of Family, Courage, and Sacrifice from Pearl Harbor to Iwo Jima, incorporating the personal stories of several United States Marines into the larger story of the Pacific Campaign, making The New York Times bestseller list on March 15, 2020.

== Personal life ==
Martha MacCallum married Dan Gregory on August 22, 1992, at St. Elizabeth Church in Wyckoff, New Jersey. Together, they have 3 children, two sons and a daughter.

== See also ==
- New Yorkers in journalism
