= Starting From Now =

Starting From Now may refer to:

== Television ==
- Starting From … Now! (TV series), a 2010s Australian TV show
- Starting From Now (TV game show), a failed 1984 British game show, with host Michael Barrymore
- Starting From Now (web series), a web series recognized at the 2017 Vancouver Web Series Festival for best actress and nominated at the 2017 8th Indie Series Awards

== Music ==
- "Starting From Now" (Chinese: 現在開始; pinyin: Xian Zai Kai Shi), a 2014 song by Fahrenheit off the EP Cut (EP)
- Starting From Now (album), a 2017 EP by Catherine McGrath
- "Starting From Now" (song), a 2017 Catherine McGrath song written by Preston (singer)

== See also ==
- "Starting From Now, It Won't Become a Song" (Japanese: ここから先は歌にならない, romanized: Koko kara Saki wa Uta ni Naranai), a 2021 song by Poppin'Party, the theme song for the Japanese TV anime cartoon Remake Our Life!
- Starting Now (disambiguation)
