= Money Management International =

Nonprofit financial counseling organization

- Company type: 501(C)(3) Nonprofit
- Founded: 1997
- Founder: Terry M. Blaney
- Headquarters: Stafford, Texas, United States
- Number of locations: 40 (2018)
- Key people: Jim Triggs, Chief Executive Officer
- Services: Financial education and counseling
- Revenue: $52.2 million (2018)
- Total assets: $55.5 million (2018)
- Number of employees: 440 (2018)
- Website: www.moneymanagement.org/

Money Management International (MMI) is a United States non-profit that provides consumers with free credit counseling and education. In about 25 percent of its consultations, it helps consumers develop a debt management or repayment plan. MMI is funded primarily by creditors. Money Management International was founded in 1997 by six financial consulting organizations that were members of the Consumer Credit Counseling Services (CCCS) network.

Over time, Money Management International merged with more than 20 credit counseling organizations. The company acquired the accounts of AmeriDebt as part of AmeriDebt's bankruptcy proceedings in 2005. In 2006 it released the microsite, regiftable.com, to promote regifting as a way to reduce spending. In 2008, MMI introduced its "Thirty Steps" educational program on responsible money management.
