= START Now! =

- Founded: 2009
- Type: Non-governmental organization
- Location: Stamford, Connecticut, USA
- Region served: Connecticut
- Website: http://www.startnowct.org

START Now! (Start Taking Action and Responsibility Together Now!) is a 501(c)(3) non-profit organization designed to help individuals and families become self-sufficient by educating them and providing them with the support and opportunities available in society and allowing them to become thriving members of the community. Founded by Financial Services Executive Chris Meek, START Now! holds events, trainings, and workshops to help facilitate the building of a skill set to be successful.

== History ==
In April 2009, founder Chris Meek held his first in a series of loan modification events at the Yerwood Center. in Stamford, Connecticut. The event consisted of five banks and several agencies offering foreclosure assistance. The program enabled 36 families to modify their mortgage, avoid going into foreclosure and losing their homes. The success and public request for more programs led Meek to create the not-for-profit START Now! in May 2009.

Subsequent loan modification events were held in May 2009, again at the Yerwood Center, August 2009 at the Connecticut State Capitol, April 2010 at FSW, Inc. in Bridgeport, Connecticut, October 2010 at the Yerwood Center, November 2010 at Western Connecticut State University in Danbury, Connecticut with several additional events since.

The program has grown to include major banks such as HSBC, JP Morgan Chase, Bank of America, and CitiMortgage (Citigroup). Regional banks such as Webster, People's United Bank and NewAlliance Bank and agencies like the Connecticut Housing Finance Authority., Urban League of Southwestern Connecticut., Money Management International., Catholic Charities, the Housing Development Fund., Mutual Housing Association of Southwestern Connecticut, and Mediation Specialists from the Fairfield Judicial District have all participated.

START Now! also holds job readiness workshops helping participants prepare resumes and cover letters, learn how to apply for jobs online and hone their interviewing skills through videotaping mock interviews. The organization also hosted a Green Jobs Fair in conjunction with Norwalk Community College. To date, the program has shown both success and growth, having helped over 250 people and banks avoid foreclosure.

== Partnerships ==
- Federal Reserve Bank of New York
- Bank of America
- Chase
- HSBC
- Money Management International
- NewAlliance Bank
- People's United Bank
- Webster Bank
