= SoldierStrong =

501(c)(3) charitable organization

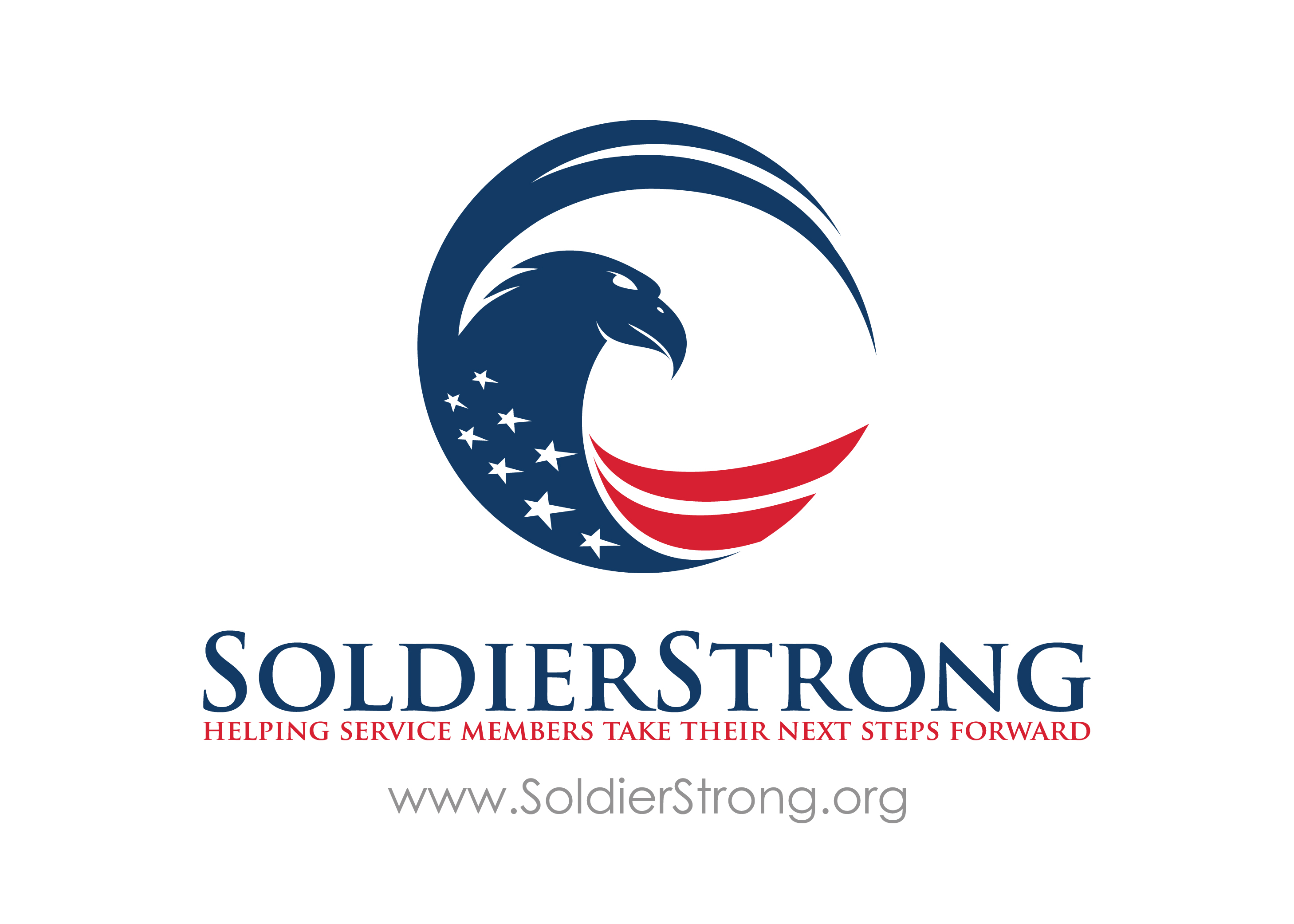
- Founded: 2009
- Founder: Chris Meek
- Type: Charitable Organization
- Headquarters: Stamford, Connecticut
- Board of directors: Chris Meek; Scott Duffy; Jeremy Wien; Leora Levy; Allison Stack; Adam Dikker; Darlene Rosenkoetter; Zachary Sheinberg
- Website: SoldierStrong.org

SoldierStrong (formerly SoldierSocks) is a Stamford, Connecticut based 501(c)(3) charitable organization whose mission is to help America's military veterans take their next steps forward in life after service.

Founded in 2009, SoldierStrong began by providing basic supplies and delivering holiday items to frontline troops. The mission has now expanded to provide medical technology to Veterans Affairs medical facilities and individual veterans in the United States.

Since SoldierStrong's inception, the organization has donated more than $5.5 million of medical devices to help injured veterans.

== History ==
SoldierStrong started in Stamford, Connecticut in 2009. Co-founder Chris Meek, a philanthropist and businessman received a letter in July 2009 from Sergeant Major Luke Converse requesting help in obtaining socks and baby wipes for his Marines serving in Afghanistan who were having difficulty getting these types of supplies at forward operating locations. Shortly after receipt of this letter, Meek formed a 501(c)(3) to help raise funds and gather basic supplies for the troops. By 2013, SoldierStrong shipped over 1,500 pounds of supplies to Sgt Major Converse and his US Marine Corps unit in Afghanistan, and in the next five years, it had shipped over 37 tons, 75,000 pounds, of personal hygienic supplies to US Armed Forces serving in Iraq and Afghanistan.

By 2017, the organization had donated more than $2 million worth of medical devices. This helped 25,000 spinal cord-injured veterans get access to equipment that helps them use their arms or legs. As of 2019, the organization funded five medical devices and was focused on finding comprehensive technology to help veterans. SoldierStrong has also donated 30 exoskeleton suits to VA hospitals providing access to 35,000 injured veterans nationwide.

SoldierStrong broadened its reach to create SoldierSanta in 2010 to send gifts to the troops during the holiday season. In July 2012, SoldierStrong launched SoldierStrong Veterans Education Foundation to help those returning from the frontlines of battle.

SoldierStrong expanded its mission to aid returning military servicemen and women with rehabilitation and prosthetic technologies through its program SoldierSuit. It also provides educational opportunities through SoldierScholar, financial aid for veterans receiving spinal care at independent physical rehab facilities through its SoldierRecovery program and provides virtual reality equipment to Veterans Affairs medical centers in the US to help veterans with post-traumatic stress through BraveMind.

== Partnerships ==
Since its inception, SoldierStrong has partnered with a host of local and national organizations in its drive to supply troops with basic necessities and veterans with revolutionary medical technology. In addition to local businesses and organizations, local, states and national elected officials and community leaders have also assisted in this initiative.

Connecticut's Hope Street Pharmacy was the first local organization to partner with SoldierStrong. Other partners from the local community include The New Balance store in New Canaan, CT and Reveal Hair Salon in Stamford, CT.

In November 2009, Elvis Duran and the Morning Show teamed up with SoldierStrong and pushed the organization onto the national scene via their network of syndicated radio stations in over 30 markets across the country. Elvis Duran and the Morning Show and WWE helped to collect more than 12,000 pairs of socks and 2,500 pounds of supplies. The Connecticut General Assembly partnered with SoldierSocks in December 2009 for a drive, where they were able to collect more than 500 pounds of tube socks.

National corporate sponsors have included Sports Illustrated Magazine, Cablevision, United Airlines and Vineyard Vines. United Rentals became a major corporate sponsor in 2014, and has remained so as of 2024. Additionally, they were instrumental in starting the Turns for Troops program. Since 2019, the Graham and Courtney Rahal Foundation has donated over $1.5 million to their charitable partners, which includes Turns For Troops/SoldierStrong, through the Vino For Vets fundraiser event.

SoldierStrong partners with the Veterans Administration to offer their BraveMind program, a virtual reality therapy system which is intended to treat post-traumatic stress in veterans receiving services from VA hospitals. Other partnerships include Specialty Freight Services, Fraternal Order of Eagles, S&P Global, The Wawa Foundation, Multistack, Total, Operation Hat Trick, Horizon Media, General Dynamics, Honeywell, GE Foundation, Honor and Respect and Rosati Ice.

During an appearance at the 2020 VHA Innovation Experience (iEX) conference, Meek announced that the organization was teaming up with Dean Kamen and his company, DEKA (company), to donate ten IBOT wheelchairs to individual wounded veterans. The iBOT wheelchair, developed by Kamen in partnership with DEKA and Johnson & Johnson Independent Technology division, is a one-of-a-kind, powered wheelchair that climbs stairs, allows users to rise from sitting level to six feet tall, maintains superior balance compared to other products on the market and is capable of traveling through sand and standing water.

== BraveMind ==
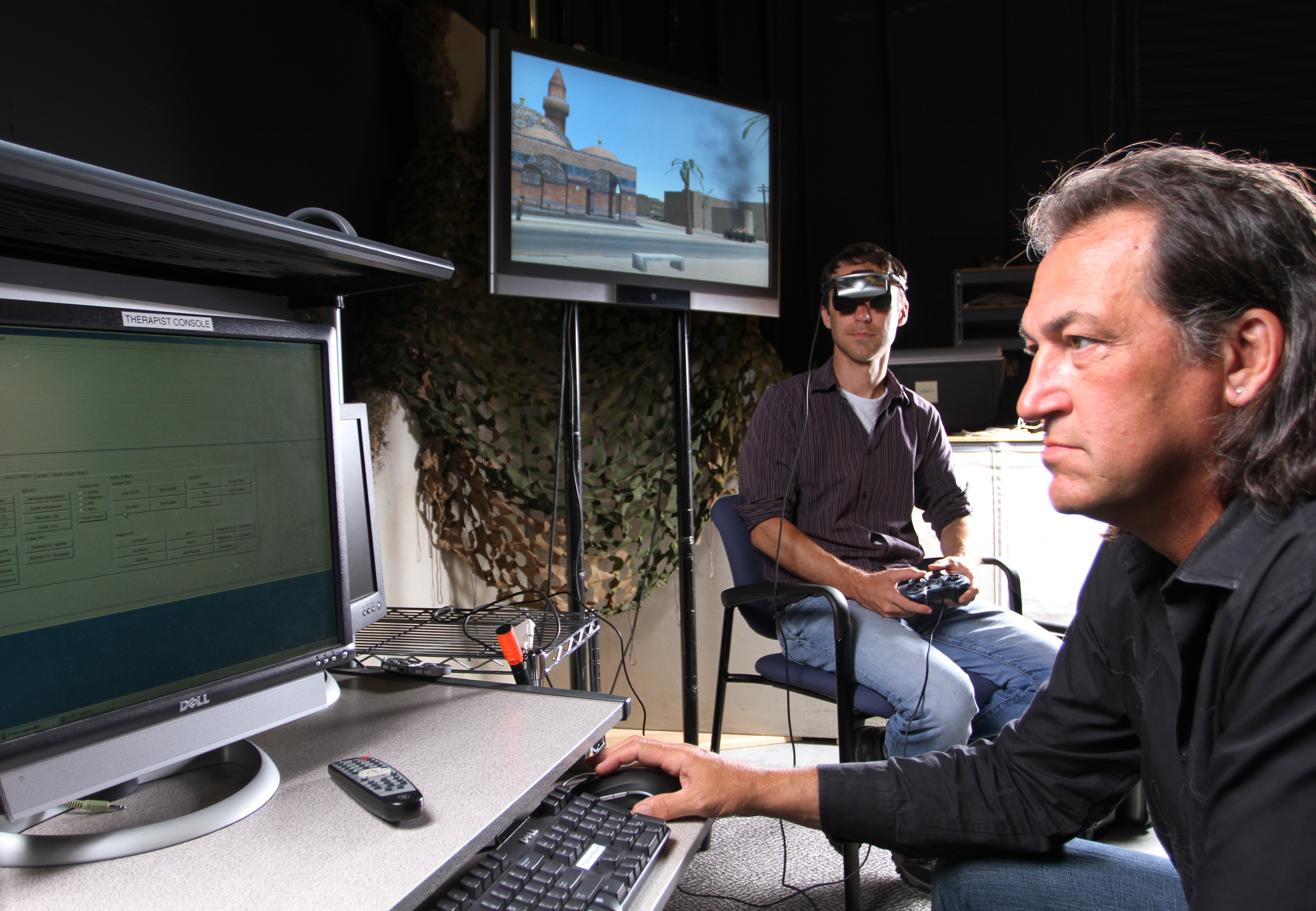
Dr. Albert "Skip" Rizzo treating a veteran with Post-Traumatic Stress using his Bravemind virtual reality software

SoldierStrong's BraveMind program, (formerly known as StrongMind program) provides help for veterans experiencing post-traumatic stress. The VR exposure therapy and accompanying technology offered through Veterans Affairs medical facilities includes extinction learning where a patient confronts and reprocesses difficult emotional memories at a pace they can handle and try to overcome it through ten sessions till the event no longer affects them.

SoldierStrong, working closely in conjunction with the VA Innovation Center, recognizes VA clinics across the country with an emphasis on research at which to distribute the BraveMind virtual reality post-traumatic stress protocol. As more resources become available and more clinical testing is completed, SoldierStrong plans to expand distribution of the protocol to additional VA centers so that veterans in all 50 states have access to the treatment.

In 2019, SoldierStrong made a commitment to donate 10 BraveMind systems to VA medical centers across the country, but as of 2023, the organization has donated 30 BraveMind systems.

Through a partnership with Syracuse University and Operation Hat Trick, the first BraveMind virtual reality system was donated to the Syracuse VA in September 2019. Additionally, the technology has been donated to VA medical facilities in Washington, Virginia, Texas, Mississippi, North Carolina, Nevada, California and Alaska among many other centers in the U.S. In January 2020, a House Veterans Committee panel reviewed and recognized programs from across the country, including SoldierStrong's BraveMind program, that are helping to lower suicide rates among veterans.

In February 2023, SoldierStrong partnered with University of Southern California to further develop Battle Buddy, a mobile app for veterans' mental health and wellness. It has a virtual assistant that includes the VA's Safety Planning program in short daily check-ins with veterans. Veterans can link their wearable sensors to track sleep, exercise and other health indicators. The app uses real-time data collected through technology to reduce the suicide rates and improve well-being of veterans. Battle Buddy was one of the winners at the Mission Daybreak, a $20 million grand challenge organized by The Department of Veterans Affairs to reduce suicides in veterans and military-connected population.

== SoldierScholar program ==
In June 2012, SoldierStrong launched a scholarship initiative, SoldierScholar, to help fill the funding gaps of the G.I. Bill for veterans seeking to pursue higher education upon the completion of their service. Currently, SoldierStrong partners with the Maxwell School of Citizenship & Public Affairs at Syracuse University, the Walsh School of Foreign Service at Georgetown University and the Batten College of Engineering and Technology at Old Dominion University. These scholarships are awarded in the fields of Public Administration, Foreign Service and STEM (Science, Technology, Engineering, Math). Since 2012, the organization has awarded more than $500,000 in scholarships to more than 30 veterans.

== SoldierSuit ==
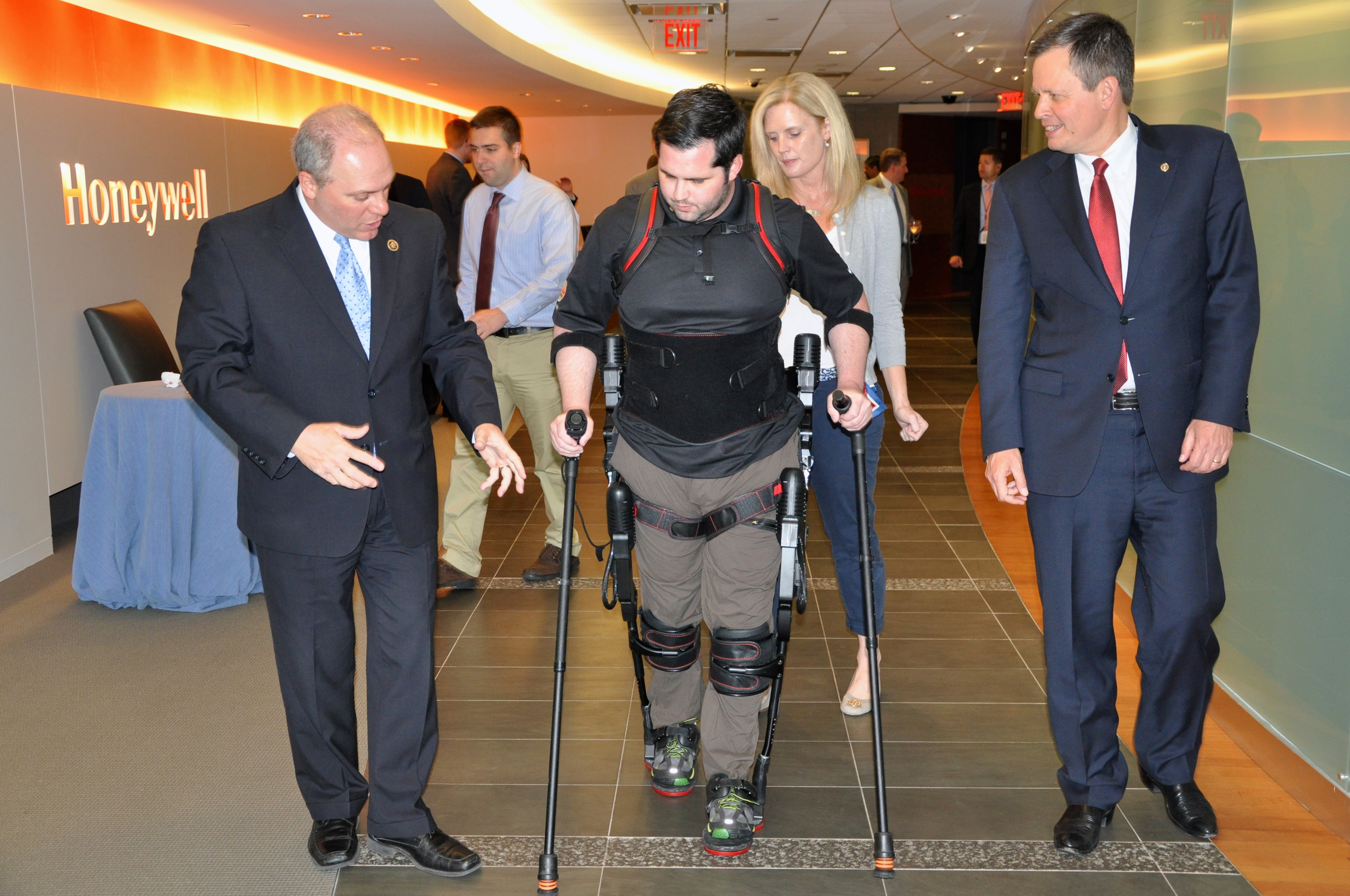
A paralyzed veteran walks with the help of a SoldierSuit

In July 2013, SoldierStrong expanded the scope of its mission. Partnering with Ekso Bionics, the SoldierSuit program is mainly aimed at providing robotic exoskeletons to injured and paralyzed veterans to assist them in standing and walking again In December 2013, SoldierStrong donated its first SoldierSuit to a veteran who became paralyzed when his truck drove over an IED in Afghanistan. Their initial goal was to deliver 10 of these suits to wounded and paralyzed veterans. As of 2023, the organization has donated its 30th SoldierSuit.

In 2013, the Milwaukee VA Medical Center hosted Ekso Bionics to demo the mechanized suit. In December, SoldierStrong donated the suit to a wounded veteran seeking treatment at the facility. In 2014, SoldierStrong donated its second suit to the VA Boston Healthcare System. It also donated suits to VA Medical Centers in Palo Alto, Richmond, Dallas, New Orleans and Bronx. In 2015, suits were donated to VA Medical Centers in Oklahoma City, Seattle and Houston. In 2016, suits were donated to VA Medical Centers in Denver, Philadelphia's Magee Rehab Center, Minneapolis, and Minnesota. In 2017, suits were donated to VA Medical Centers in Long Beach, Omaha's CHI-Immanuel Rehab and San Antonio. In 2018, exoskeletons were donated to the VA Medical Centers in St. Louis, Tampa South Texas, as well as the Iowa Methodist Medical Center. In 2019, SoldierStrong donated 22 medical devices to benefit veterans, 18 of which have gone to the VA system. The exoskeletons were donated to the VA Medical Centers in North Texas, Phoenix, San Diego, Cleveland, Boston, the VA Northeast Ohio Health Care System in Cleveland, Ohio, the Orlando VA Health Care System in Orlando, Florida and the Augusta VA Health Care System in Augusta, Georgia.

In 2018, the members of the organization testified in front of the U.S. House of Representatives subcommittee on Research and Technology and subcommittee on Energy about using hyper-advanced medical devices to improve the lives of veterans.

== Recognition ==
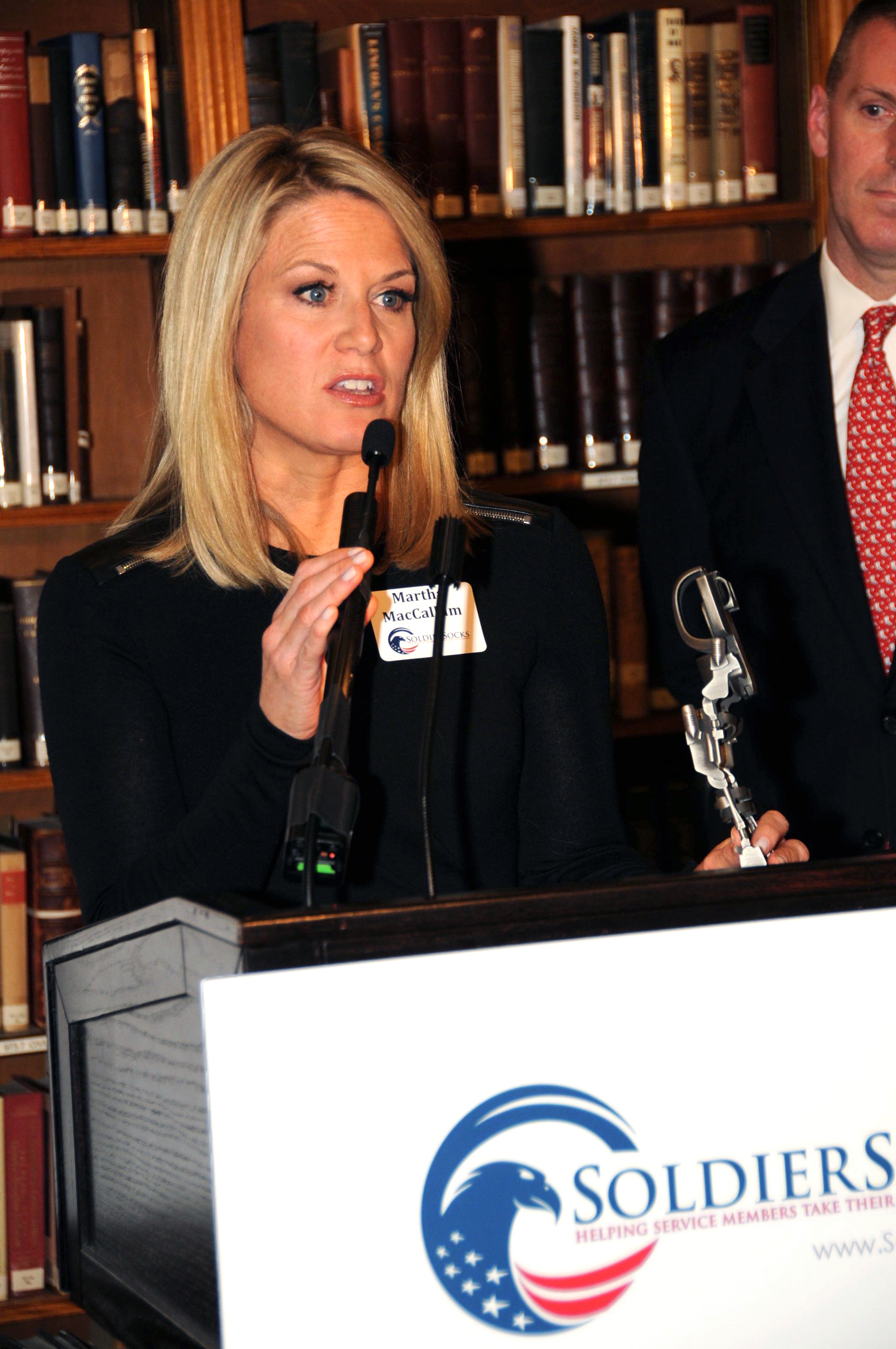
Fox News Anchor and SoldierStrong Advisory Board member Martha MacCallum accepts award at SoldierStrong Awards ceremony

SoldierStrong has been recognized with several awards and its work has been featured in many publications. The organization was awarded the President's Call to Service Award from President Barack Obama in 2012 and the founder was presented with the Orange Circle Award for the groups' philanthropic work in 2014. Presented by Syracuse University, the award recognizes members of the SU community who have done extraordinary things in the service of others.

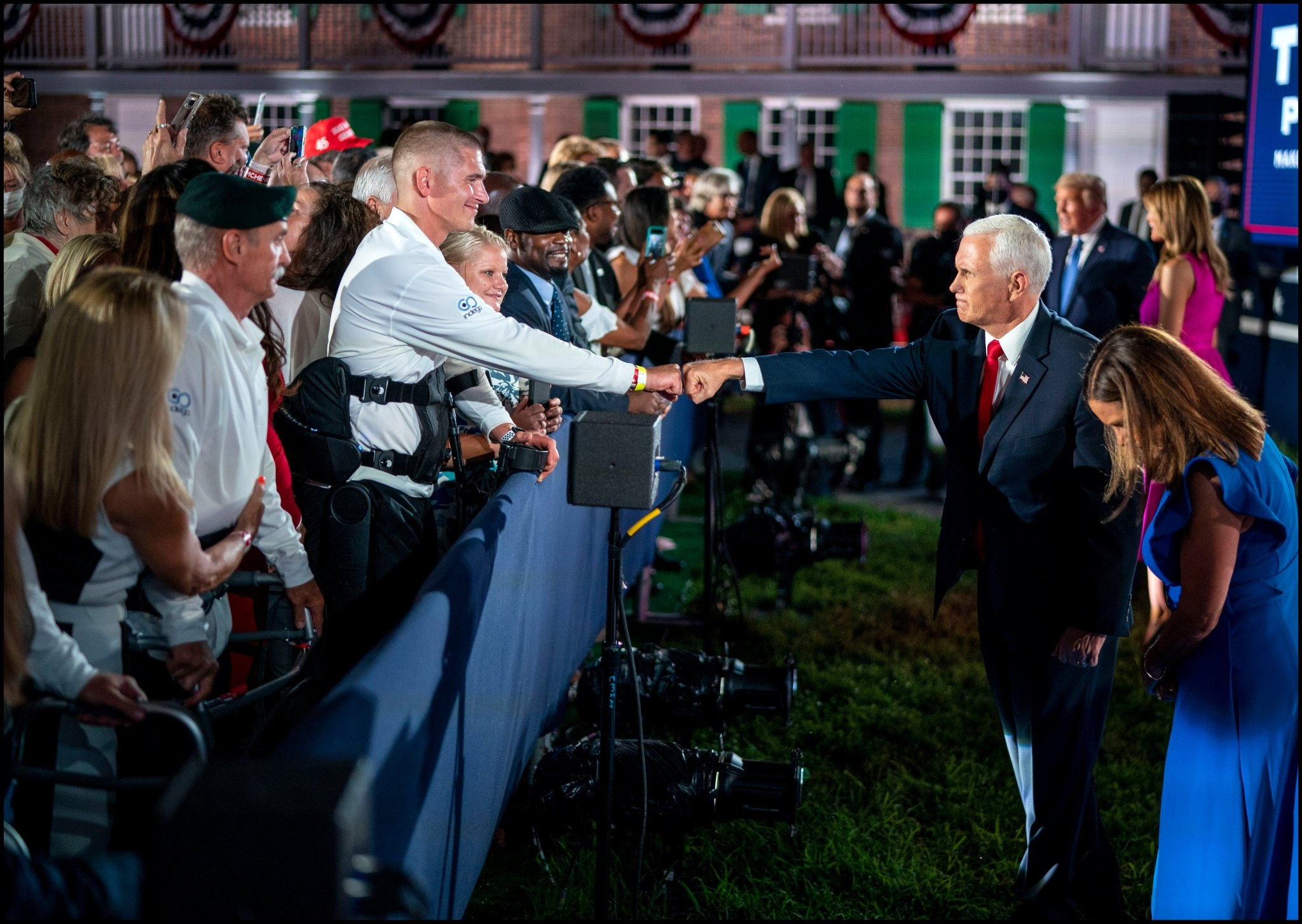
Vice President Mike Pence fist-bumps a veteran using an Indego exoskeleton suit donated by SoldierStrong

On August 26, 2020, veterans representing SoldierStrong were present at Fort McHenry on the third night of the Republican National Convention where they were greeted by President Donald Trump and First Lady Melania Trump and demonstrated the Indego exoskeleton suit by standing for the flag during the national anthem. Vice President Mike Pence also acknowledged SoldierStrong for their work providing revolutionary medical technologies to veterans during his speech to accept the Republican Party's nomination for vice president.

In 2020, SoldierStrong and the Institute for Creative Technologies at the University of Southern California were nominated at the Igniting Innovation Conference and Awards by the VHA Innovation Ecosystem, an organization that promotes health care innovation for veterans. The organization's BraveMind program received the "Game Changer" award.

SoldierStrong's work has been featured in People magazine, Men's Health, and The Chronicle of Philanthropy.

== Professional sports events ==
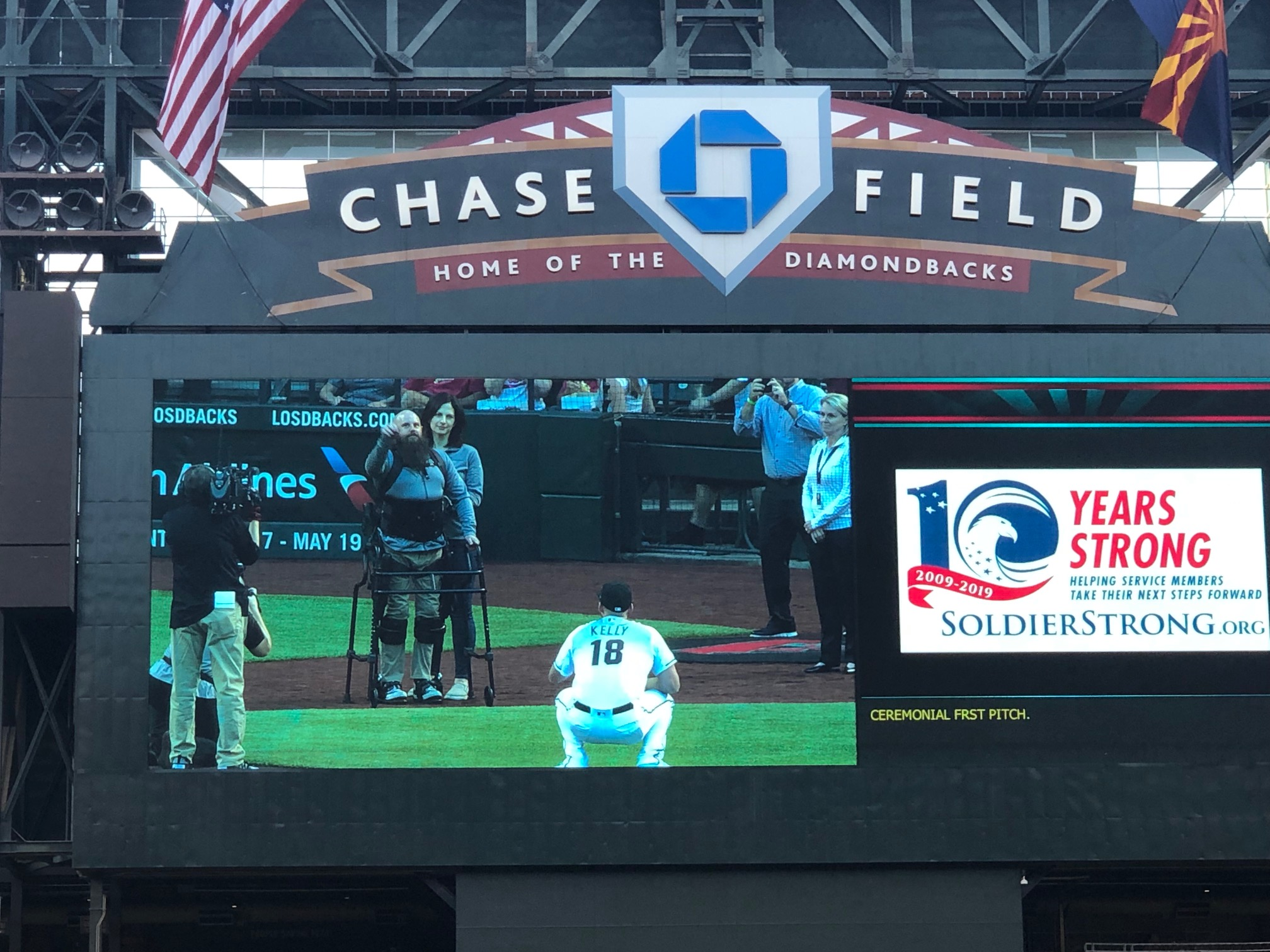
A SoldierSuit recipient, seen on the jumbotron, throwing the opening pitch at a Major League Baseball game during a "Welcome Back Veterans" event

SoldierStrong has been featured in a number of professional sporting events.

In 2015, SoldierStrong was featured during MLB's "Welcome Back Veterans" events at a New York Yankees-Boston Red Sox game and at a Chicago Cubs-Milwaukee Brewers game, and was also featured as part of the NFL's "Salute to Service", and appeared at Eagles, Dolphins, Vikings, 49ers, and Cowboys games.

In 2016, SoldierStrong became the charitable partner of Turns for Troops. Turns for Troops is sponsored by United Rentals and the Rahal-Letterman-Lanigan Indycar team. A $50 donation is made for every lap Indy Driver Graham Rahal completes. Team Rahal-Letterman-Lanigan has hosted SoldierStrong and SoldierStrong Ambassador SGT Dan Rose at several races and Team RLL events, including pre-race appearances on-track in the SoldierSuit. As of January 2024, United Rentals has donated close to $2 million to the organization's mission.

SoldierStrong has also been a charitable partner of the Never Forget Tribute Classic presented by United Rentals, most recently at the fourth annual Classic in 2019. The Classic features a doubleheader between four notable universities.

== Annual gala and awards events ==
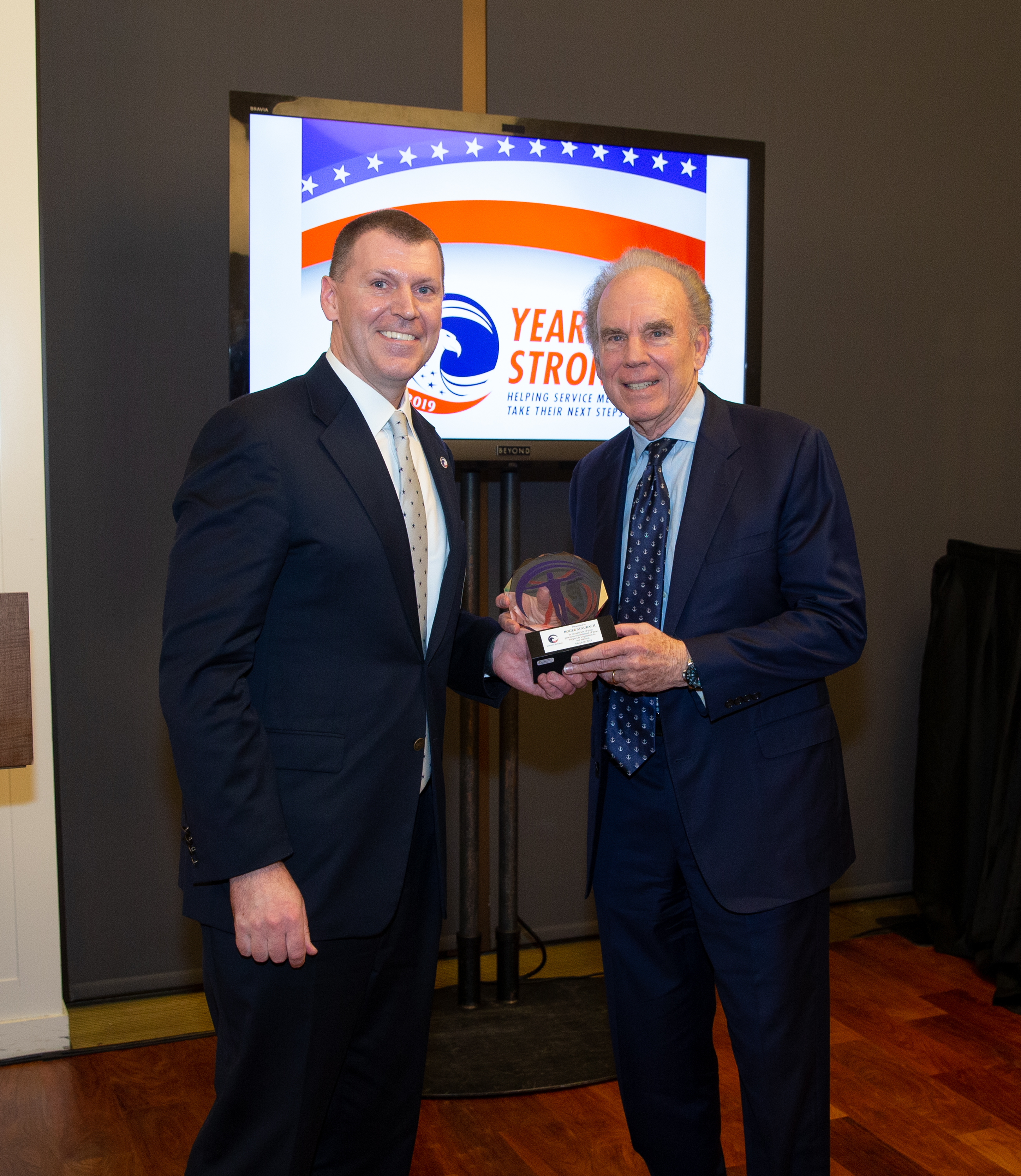
NFL Hall of Fame quarterback Roger Staubach with SoldierStrong chairman Chris Meek. SoldierStrong honored Staubach for a lifetime of service supporting veterans at a fundraiser at the George W. Bush Presidential Center in Dallas, Texas on March 28, 2019.

SoldierStrong began hosting an annual gala event in 2014 where the organization presents the Commitment to Service Award to individuals and organizations who SoldierStrong believes have made outstanding contributions to American service members and veterans in the preceding year.

Past individual and corporate recipients include:

- Individual Award: Martha MacCallum (2014)
- Corporate Award: United Rentals, Inc (2014)
- Individual co-recipients: Alex Gorsky and Elvis Duran (2015)
- Corporate Award: WWE, Inc. (2015)
- Individual Award: Graham Rahal (2016)
- Corporate Award: Dinosaur Bar-B-Que (2016)
- Individual Award: Jon Runyon (2017)
- Corporate Award: Multistack, LLC (2017)
- Individual Award: Bill Koenigsburg (2018)
- Corporate Award: S&P Global (2018)
- Corporate Award: Rosati Ice (2019)
- Individual Award Co-Recipients: Dr. Barbara Van Dahlen and Dr. Albert "Skip" Rizzo (2020)
- Individual Award: Sylvie Légère (2023)
- Corporate Award: Flags of Valor (2023)
- Individual Award: LTG (Ret.) Patricia "Patty" D. Horoho (2024)
- Corporate Award: Bobby Rahal Automotive Group (2024)
- Individual Award: Mark Gottwald and Shari Yates (2025)
- Corporate Award: Patriot Mobile (2025)
