= Tom Gegax =

American investor

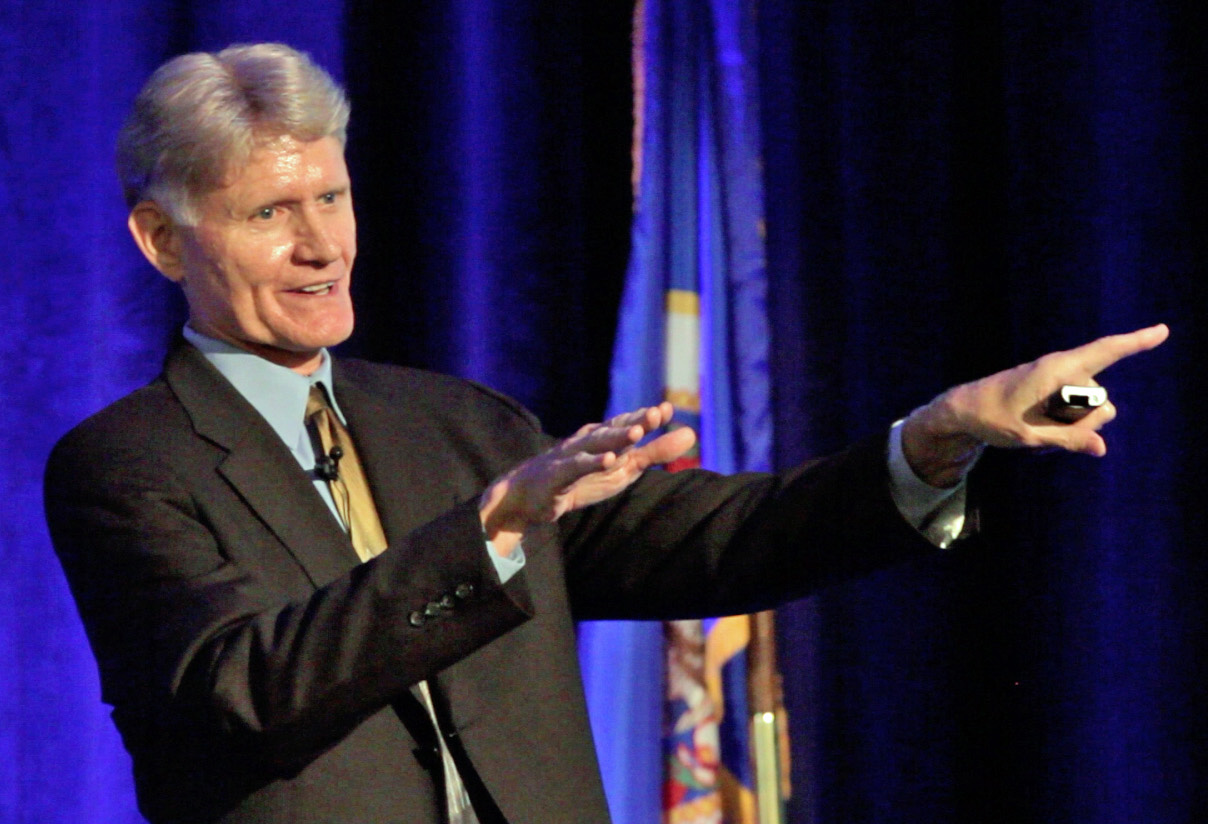
Tom Gegax

Tom Gegax (born in 1946 in Connersville, Indiana) is an American entrepreneur, author, speaker, and angel investor.

== Overview ==
In 1976, Gegax co-founded Tires Plus, a retail tire business, with Don Gullett. Gegax was chairman and CEO (head coach) of the company and grew the business to 150 stores and $200 million in sales. In 2000, as the company’s majority shareholder, Gegax facilitated the sale of Tires Plus to Bridgestone/Firestone and is chairman emeritus.

Gegax is a best-selling author with books published by HarperCollins and Random House; his management methods have been featured in multiple national newspapers and magazines. In 2001, Gegax founded Gegax Advisors to provide consulting and coaching to business owners and high-level executives; he maintains offices in Minneapolis and San Diego.

Gegax is Chairman of The Gramercy Fund, LLP, an angel investment portfolio of early stage companies, as well as his philanthropic venture, Gegax Family Foundation.

Gegax is also the producer of a short documentary called Spark: A Systemic Racism Story, which explores the roots and remedies of systemic racism. www.spark-doc.com

Gegax is the head coach and director of the documentary feature film, Confessions of a CEO which debuted on Amazon Prime, Apple TV, Fandango at Home, Vimeo on Demand, and Google Play, following its January theatrical run. Confessions is a crackling critique of corporate America told through the powerful true story of a toxic CEO who evolves from a profits-over-people, philandering executive to an unorthodox leader, populist messenger, and mentor to American influencers. It’s a story of growth, redemption and the impact of self-awareness on leadership and life.

== Biography ==
=== Early years ===
Tom Gegax was born in 1946 in Connersville, Indiana to Elizabeth (Alexander) Gegax and Bill Gegax. Tom’s mother, Elizabeth, graduated from the University of Houston and became a social worker. His father, Bill, served in World War II as a First Lieutenant in Patton's Army 4th Armored Division, Engineering Corp. Following the war, Bill owned a service station, a construction company, and was a top salesman for Gibraltar Mausoleum Co. The couple had three other children: Gary, Tim, and a daughter, Lynn, who died of a brain tumor in 1956 at the age of two.

=== Education ===
Gegax attended Indiana’s North Vernon High School where he lettered in golf, tennis, and baseball, and was an All State basketball player. After graduating high school in 1964, he received a Congressional appointment to West Point as a First Alternate. When the primary appointee failed his physical, Gegax successfully passed his own physical and was preparing for admission to the military academy when he was informed that the primary appointee’s failed physical had been waived. No longer headed for West Point, Gegax enrolled at Indiana University where he graduated in 1968 with a Bachelor of Science in Business Management.

=== Family ===
In 1966, at the age of nineteen, Tom Gegax married Jan Pierson. Together they had two sons: Trent and Chris. Trent Gegax was a long-time correspondent for Newsweek magazine and is CEO of The Gramercy Fund. Chris Gegax is a video producer. Tom and Jan Gegax divorced in 1991; in 1993, Gegax entered into a relationship with Mary Wescott, a top radio sales representative who now runs Gegax Family Foundation and is on site producer for Tom’s speaking events. They share homes in Minneapolis and San Diego.

=== Employment and accomplishments ===
Gegax was hired directly out of college by Shell Oil Company in Chicago, IL and worked from 1968 to 1973 in employee relations (later called human resources) and as a territory manager servicing service station dealers with territories in the inner city of Chicago’s southside. He transferred with Shell Oil to Minneapolis, MN in 1973 where he worked as a Sales Manager until 1976.

In 1976, Gegax co-founded Tires Plus, a retail tire business, with Don Gullett. Tires Plus began as a small startup, emerging from an idea Tom sketched onto a restaurant napkin, and mushroomed under Tom’s leadership into a market leader with 150 upscale stores in ten states and $200 million in revenue. Gegax was chairman and CEO (head coach) and was able to bypass outside investors over the years by tightly managing his company.

In 2000, as the company’s majority shareholder, Gegax sold Tires Plus to Bridgestone/Firestone and is chairman emeritus.

Following the sale of Tires Plus, Gegax founded three companies: Gegax Advisors, The Gramercy Fund, and Gegax Family Foundation. Through Gegax Advisors, Tom provides consulting and coaching to business owners and high-level executives. As chairman of The Gramercy Fund, LLP, an angel investment portfolio of early stage companies, Gegax, along with his son, Trent, is an investor, director, and advisor to a variety of businesses.

As an author, Tom’s Big Book of Small Business: You Don’t Have to Run Your Business by The Seat of Your Pants (HarperCollins, 2007), has gained endorsements by America’s leading business minds, including Ken Blanchard (The One-Minute Manager), Harvey Mackay (Swim with the Sharks), and author of the foreword, Richard Schulze, Founder and Chairman of Best Buy. The first incarnation of the book, entitled By the Seat of Your Pants, was a best seller, with Sam's Club selling 60,000 copies to its small business clients. His co-author on these books was Phil Bolsta. Tom's first book, Winning in the Game of Life: Self-Coaching Secrets for Success (Random House, 1999), is a blueprint for creating a productive, well-balanced life. It received critical acclaim from publishing industry bellwethers Publishers Weekly and Booklist, from self-help and spiritual guru, Deepak Chopra, and from national business and political leaders, including Curt Carlson, Founder/Chairman, of Carlson (formerly “Carlson Companies”), as well as former vice president of the United States, Walter Mondale.

=== Other roles ===
Gegax’s board of directors’ work includes health and environmental organizations such as the American Heart Association, the American Cancer Society, Deepak Chopra Enterprises, John Robbins’ EarthSave, Robert F. Kennedy Jr.’s Waterkeeper Alliance, Dan Buettner (Blue Zones) and chairman at Center For Science in the Public Interest, an organization that has always been at the forefront of health (organic standards, food labeling).

== Bibliography ==
- The Big Book of Small Business: You Don't Have To Run Your Business By The Seat Of Your Pants, HarperCollins (Feb 2007) ISBN 978-0-06-120669-6 Foreword by Richard Schulze, Founder and Chairman, Best Buy
- Winning in the Game of Life: Self-Coaching Secrets for Success (1999) ISBN 0-9740675-0-4 Introduction by Deepak Chopra
