= Chris Meek =

American philanthropist and finance officer

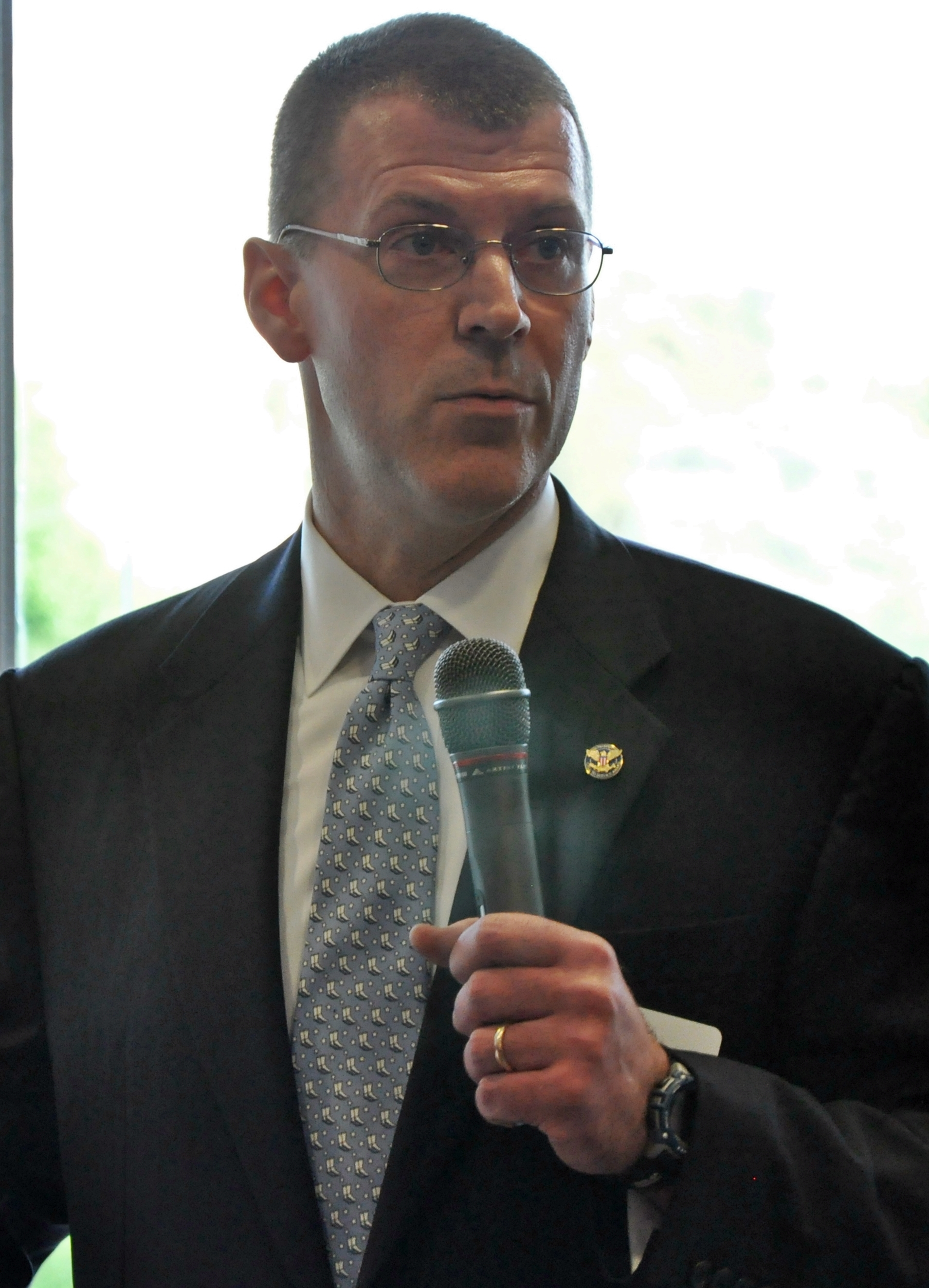
- Born: 1970 (age 55–56)
- Education: Syracuse University (BA, MPA); Pace University (MBA); University of Southern California (Doctorate)
- Occupations: Financial services executive, philanthropist, author
- Known for: Founder of SoldierStrong
Chris Meek
Academic background
- Thesis: The Barriers and Challenges Associated With Mental Health Help-Seeking Behaviors of Police Officers in the United States: A Descriptive Study (2024)

Christopher Meek (born 1970) is an American philanthropist, financial services executive and author. Meek is the co-founder and chairman of SoldierStrong, a 501(c)(3) charitable organization which provides support to America’s military veterans. He is also the co-founder of the nonprofits, ReachStrong, which provides an online resource for mental and emotional well-being and START Now!, a non-profit which provided foreclosure counseling to homeowners.

In addition to his philanthropic work, Meek has served as a financial services executive for over 25 years and has been a member of the Maxwell School Advisory Board at Syracuse University.

== Education and career ==
In 1992, Meek graduated from Syracuse University with a Bachelor of Arts in economics and political science from the Maxwell School of Citizenship and Public Affairs. He has a Master of Business Administration degree from Pace University, and an MPA from the Maxwell School at Syracuse University. In 2024, he earned a doctorate in organizational change and leadership from the University of Southern California.

Meek was an equity derivatives trader at Goldman Sachs for 16 years before stepping down as a vice president in the securities division in August 2011. He has served as the managing director of global relationship management at S&P Global. Meek also served on the board of directors at the Yerwood Center in Stamford and Career Resources, Inc. in Bridgeport.

In 2018, the George W. Bush Institute selected Meek in the inaugural class of the institute's Stand-To Veteran Leadership Initiative.

== Philanthropy ==
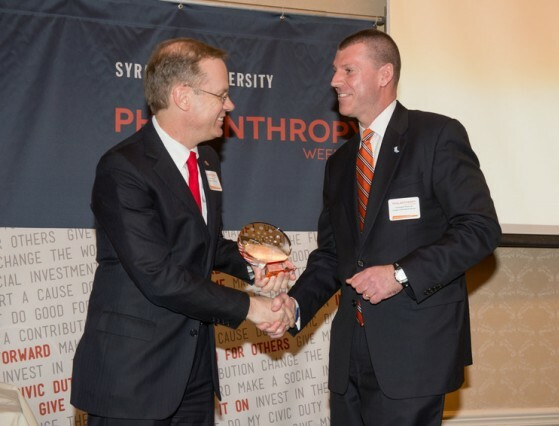
Chris Meek (right) receiving the 2014 Syracuse University Orange Circle Award for his philanthropic work from Chancellor Kent Syverud; April 2, 2014.

In April 2009, Meek held a mortgage modification event for homeowners and lenders at a Stamford, Connecticut community center. The event led to the founding of the foreclosure counseling non-profit START Now!. According to Meek, from April 2009 to March 2011, it had helped prevent foreclosures on 250 properties.

Meek also founded SoldierSocks in 2009 after a conversation with a former U.S. Marine about the lack of basic necessities, such as socks and baby wipes, available to troops in Iraq and Afghanistan. By 2013, SoldierSocks had sent 73,000 pounds of hygiene items, and founded the SoldierSocks Veterans Grant Foundation. In 2013, the organization changed its name to SoldierStrong and shifted efforts to meet the needs of returning service members. It provides medical technologies to Veterans Affairs medical facilities and individual veterans in the country. It partnered with Ekso Bionics, the manufacturers of robotic exoskeletons, to give paralyzed veterans the ability to walk again. By 2017, the organization had donated more than $2 million worth of medical devices. This helped 25,000 spinal cord-injured veterans get access to equipment that helps them use their arms or legs. As of December 2023, SoldierStrong has donated 30 exoskeleton suits to VA hospitals providing access to 35,000 injured veterans nationwide.

Through his organization, Meek provides the BraveMind virtual reality system, used to treat veterans living with PTS. The technology is developed by the USC's Institute for Creative Technologies.

Meek also provides academic scholarships through the SoldierScholar program at the Syracuse University Maxwell School of Citizenship and Public Affairs, and the Walsh School of Foreign Service at Georgetown University and at the Batten College of Engineering and Technology at Old Dominion University.

On May 22, 2018, Meek testified in front of the U.S. House Subcommittees on Research and Technology and Energy on the topic of empowering U.S. veterans through technology.

In March 2025, Meek established the 9/11 Legacy Foundation, a non-profit organization dedicated to educating the future generations and raising awareness about the impacts of the September 11 attacks. The organization advocates for the inclusion of mandatory instructions about the events of September 11, 2001 in the curricula of all the high schools in the 50 states.

== Politics ==
In the summer of 2010, Meek was appointed to the Stamford Urban Redevelopment Commission. On November 17, 2011, Meek formally announced his candidacy to represent Connecticut's 4th congressional district. He ended his campaign on May 26, 2012, a week after he got 27% of the vote in the Republican state convention. He has not been a candidate for public office since that time.

== Awards and recognition ==
In 2014, Meek received the Syracuse University’s Orange Circle Award for his philanthropic work.

== Podcast and books ==
Meek is the host of a podcast, Next Steps Forward with Dr. Chris Meek which airs on the Voice America Talk Radio Network’s Empowerment channel. On his podcast, guests such as Anne Beiler, Karen Pence, Dana Perino, Ray Scott, and Charles Haley among others have appeared.

He is also the author of the book Next Steps Forward: Beyond Remembering (ISBN 979-8986020808) which was published in May 2022. The book is about his experiences at Ground Zero on September 11, 2001 and how they impacted the course of his life. As a charter media member of the nonprofit Voices Against Trafficking, he has also contributed to the organization's anthology titled, Voices Against Trafficking: The Strength of Many Voices Speaking As One (ISBN 978-1733360524) which was published in December 2021.

In February 2025, Meek authored the book, Everyday Triumph: Extraordinary Stories of Hope, Resilience, and Impact (ISBN 979-8992357905). The book shares stories of 15 individuals and their resilience in the face of adversity.

== Personal life ==
Meek is married with three children. Meek’s mother, Camille, is a teacher who specializes in deaf education. He is guided by the Athenian Oath, which is about the principle of "leaving things better than we find them."
