= List of tallest buildings in Akron =

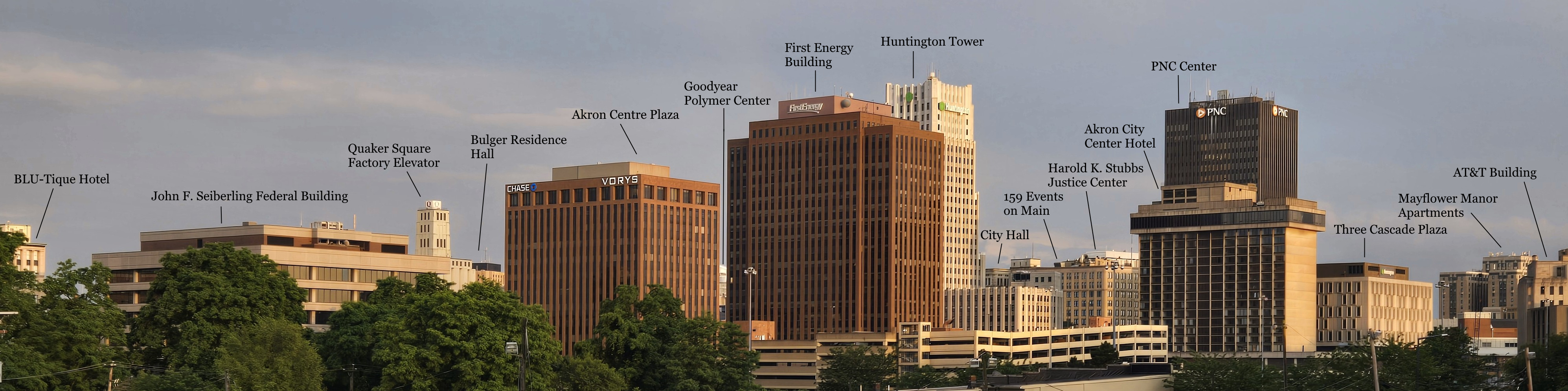
Skyline of Downtown Akron in the evening, with labels of the buildings in the skyline. 10 out of the 18 buildings on this list are featured in this photo.

This is a list of the tallest buildings in Akron, Ohio. The city has approximately 18 buildings standing at least 150 feet (46 m) tall. Since 1931, the tallest building in the city has been Huntington Tower, standing at 330 feet (100 m) tall.

== Tallest buildings ==
This list ranks Akron skyscrapers that stand at least 150 feet (46 m) tall, based on standard height measurement. This includes spires and architectural details but does not include antenna masts. Existing structures are included for ranking purposes based on present height. List may be incomplete due to the exact height of many apartment complexes not being recorded.

Tallest building in Akron upon completion

Rank	Name	Image	Height ft (m)	Floors	Year	Address	Notes
1	Huntington Tower		330 (100)	27	1931	106 South Main Street	Regional headquarters of Huntington Bancshares. Dedicated on July 23, 1931, it is considered Akron's first skyscraper. Tallest building built in the 1930s. Listed on the National Register of Historic Places.
2	PNC Building		316 (92)	23	1968	1 Cascade Plaza	Officially known as One Cascade Plaza. Tallest building built in the 1960s.
3	FirstEnergy Building		280 (85)	19	1976	76 South Main Street	Headquarters of FirstEnergy until 2023. Part of the Akron Centre complex. Tallest building built in the 1970s.
4	Quaker Square Factory Elevator		218 (66)	12	1939	120 East Mill Street	Originally built as grain silos for the Quaker Oats Company, turned into a hotel in 1980. It was owned by the University of Akron until 2025 and served as a Residence Hall until 2021. Part of a National Register of Historic Places-listed site.
5	Akron City Center Hotel		209 (64)	19	1969	20 West Mill Street	Vacant. Formerly known as the Cascade Holiday Inn. Part of Cascade Plaza.
6	Mayflower Manor Apartments		207 (63)	16	1931	263 South Main Street	Opened on May 18, 1931, the Mayflower Hotel was briefly the tallest building in Akron. Now apartments for low-income residents and those with disabilities.
7	Canal Square		203 (62)	17	1931	1 Canal Square Plaza	Houses Akron YMCA and apartments. Listed on the National Register of Historic Places. Completed on March 10, 1931, it is the tallest YMCA-only building in Ohio, along with being the largest YMCA building in the country upon its completion.
8	Goodyear Polymer Center		182 (55)	12	1991	170 University Avenue	Houses the University of Akron's Polymer Science Department. Tallest building on campus and the tallest building outside of downtown (University Park). Tallest building built in the 1990s.
9	William E. Fowler Apartments		169 (52)	13	1973	65 Byers Avenue	Tallest building in Highland Square.
9	Fir Hill Towers North		169 (52)	13	1965	55 Fir Hill	Part of the Fir Hill Towers complex in University Park.
11	Bulger Residence Hall		160 (49)	15	1969	265 Buchtel Commons	The tallest residence hall at the University of Akron.
11	CitiCenter Building		160 (49)	11	1931	146 South High Street	Former YWCA building, on the National Register of Historic Places. Completed on January 28, 1931, making it the tallest building in Akron for little more than a month.
13	Landmark Building		158 (48)	12	1923	156 South Main Street	Formerly the Akron Savings & Loan Building. Tallest building built in the 1920s.
14	The Highland Square		156 (48)	12	1969	733 West Market Street	
14	Spring Hill Apartments Phase I		156 (48)	12	1970	1221 Everton Drive	Tallest building in Sherbondy Hill.
16	Akron Centre Plaza		152 (46)	12	1982	50 South Main Street	Connected to the FirstEnergy Building. Houses the regional offices for Chase Bank. Tallest building built in the 1980s.
16	Paul E. Belcher North		152 (46)	12	1968	400 Locust Street	
18	159 Events on Main		150 (46)	11	1911	159 South Main Street	Formerly the Second National Bank Building. Initially constructed at seven-stories tall, an additional four-stories were added in 1919. Tallest building built in the 1910s.

== Timeline of tallest buildings ==
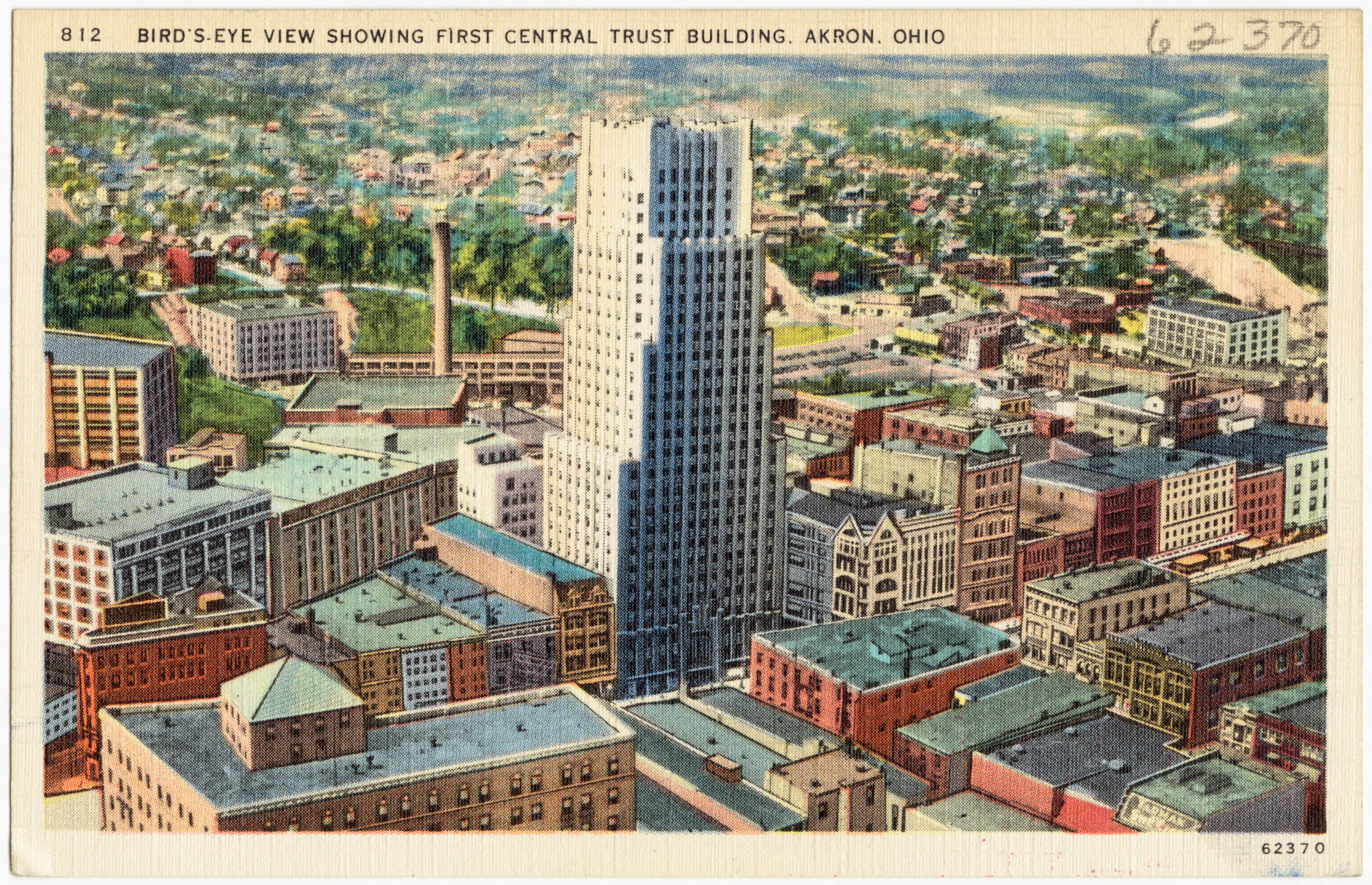
The Huntington Tower, built as the First Central Trust Tower, has stood as the tallest building in Akron since 1931.

This lists buildings that once held the title of tallest building in Akron.

Name	Street address	Years as tallest	Height ft (m)	Floors	Reference
Second National Bank Building^{[A]}	159 South Main Street	1911–1915	~110 (34)	7	
Howe Hotel	11 South Main Street (demolished 1998)	1915–1919	122 (37)	11	
Second National Bank Building	159 South Main Street	1919–1923	150 (46)	11^{[B]}	
Akron Savings & Loans Building^{[C]}	156 South Main Street	1923–1931	158 (48)	12	
Akron YWCA Building^{[D]}	146 South High Street	1931	160 (49)	11	
Akron YMCA Building^{[E]}	1 Canal Square Plaza	1931	203 (17)	17	
Mayflower Hotel^{[F]}	263 South Main Street	1931	207 (63)	16	
First Central Trust Tower^{[G]}	106 South Main Street	1931–present	330 (100)	27	

== See also ==
- List of tallest buildings in Ohio
- List of tallest buildings in Dayton
- List of tallest buildings in Cincinnati
- List of tallest buildings in Cleveland
- List of tallest buildings in Columbus
- List of tallest buildings in Toledo, Ohio

== Notes ==
A. The Second National Bank Building has since been renamed 159 Events on Main.
B. An additional four floors were added to the building in 1919, making it the city's tallest again.
C. The Akron Savings & Loans Building has since been renamed the Landmark Building.
D. The Akron YWCA Building has since been renamed the CitiCenter Building.
E. The Akron YMCA Building has since been renamed to Canal Square.
F. The Mayflower Hotel has since been renamed the Mayflower Manor Apartments.
G. The First Central Trust Tower has since been renamed the Huntington Tower.
