= Cathleen H. Nash =

American banker and business executive

- Born: c. 1964; New York City, U.S.
- Education: Ithaca College; University of Central Florida College of Business Administration
- Occupation: Banker

Cathleen H. "Cathy" Nash (born c. 1964), is an American banker and business executive. She was the chief executive officer (CEO) and president of the Woodforest National Bank, a private bank present in 17 states. She was CEO and president of Citizens Republic Bancorp from 2009 until its 2012 merger with FirstMerit Corporation.

== Early life ==
Cathleen H. Nash was born circa 1964 in New York City. She graduated from Ithaca College, where she received a bachelor of science degree in communication. She received a master in business administration from the University of Central Florida College of Business Administration.

== Career ==
Nash started her career as a bank teller at the age of twenty-two. She was an executive at the Bank of Boston from 1987 to 1993, and she served as senior vice president of SunTrust Banks from 2003 to 2006.

Nash joined the Citizens Republic Bancorp in 2006, where she held several executive positions for the next three years. She served as its chief executive officer and president from 2009 to 2012, when it merged with FirstMerit Corporation. The merger led to a lawsuit from shareholders over golden parachutes for senior executives.

Nash served as the chief executive officer and president of the Woodforest National Bank from April 16, 2015 to January 2019, replacing Robert E. Marling Jr.
