= Robert E. Marling Jr. =

American banker and business executive (born 1956)

- Born: c. 1956
- Education: Dobie High School
- Occupation: Banker
- Spouse: Kimberly Ann Marling

Robert E. Marling Jr. (born c. 1956) is an American banker and business executive. He served as the chief executive officer of the Woodforest National Bank from 1990 to 2015 and as its chairman from 2004 to 2015. During his tenure, he opened 720 branches in Walmart stores and 37 regular branches in 17 states.

== Early life ==
Robert E. Marling Jr. graduated from the Dobie High School in 1974.

== Career ==
Marling worked for the First City Bancorporation and Affiliated Computer Services. He also served as the chairman of Texas DCS.

Marling became executive vice president of the Woodforest National Bank in 1989. He served as its chief executive officer from 1990 to 2015, and as its chairman from 2004 to 2015. Under his tenure, the bank opened 720 branches in Walmart stores, beginning in Conroe, Texas in 1996. He also oversaw the dedication of 37 regular branches. From Texas, Marling spread the bank marketshare to 17 states. In 2010, the bank received a US$33 million penalty from federal regulators for "unfair and deceptive practices involving fees for overdrafts." In 2014, an article in The Wall Street Journal explained that Marling welcomed clients with bad credit and that 78% of bank revenues came from overdraft and bounced check fees. Marling stepped down in 2015, and he was succeeded by Cathleen H. Nash.

== Philanthropy ==
Marling formerly served on the board of the Cynthia Woods Mitchell Pavilion and the Memorial Hermann Health System. He served as the vice chairman of the United Way of Montgomery County, Texas in 2002 and as its chairman in 2003. Additionally, he was honored by the American Heart Association of Montgomery County in 2003. He was inducted into the Texas Bankers Hall of Fame by Sam Houston State University in 2015.

== Political contributions ==
Marling is a prominent donor to Republican politicians, having donated US$50,000 to the Club for Growth and over US$38,000 to the National Republican Congressional Committee. He also donated US$34,000 to Mitt Romney and US$7,000 to Ted Cruz, including to the latter's 2016 presidential campaign. In 2021, Marling's company Tranquil Path Investments contributed $500,000 to a Super PAC for Donald Trump.

Marling was the largest donor to the offer to oust incumbent U.S. Representative Dan Crenshaw, donating $675,000 to a Super PAC opposing Crenshaw. His donations constituted roughly two-thirds of the PAC's total spending, leading to Crenshaw losing renomination to Steve Toth.

== Personal life ==
Marling is married to Kimberly Ann Marling. They have three children. They reside in The Woodlands, Texas.
