= Mail chute =

Letter collection device

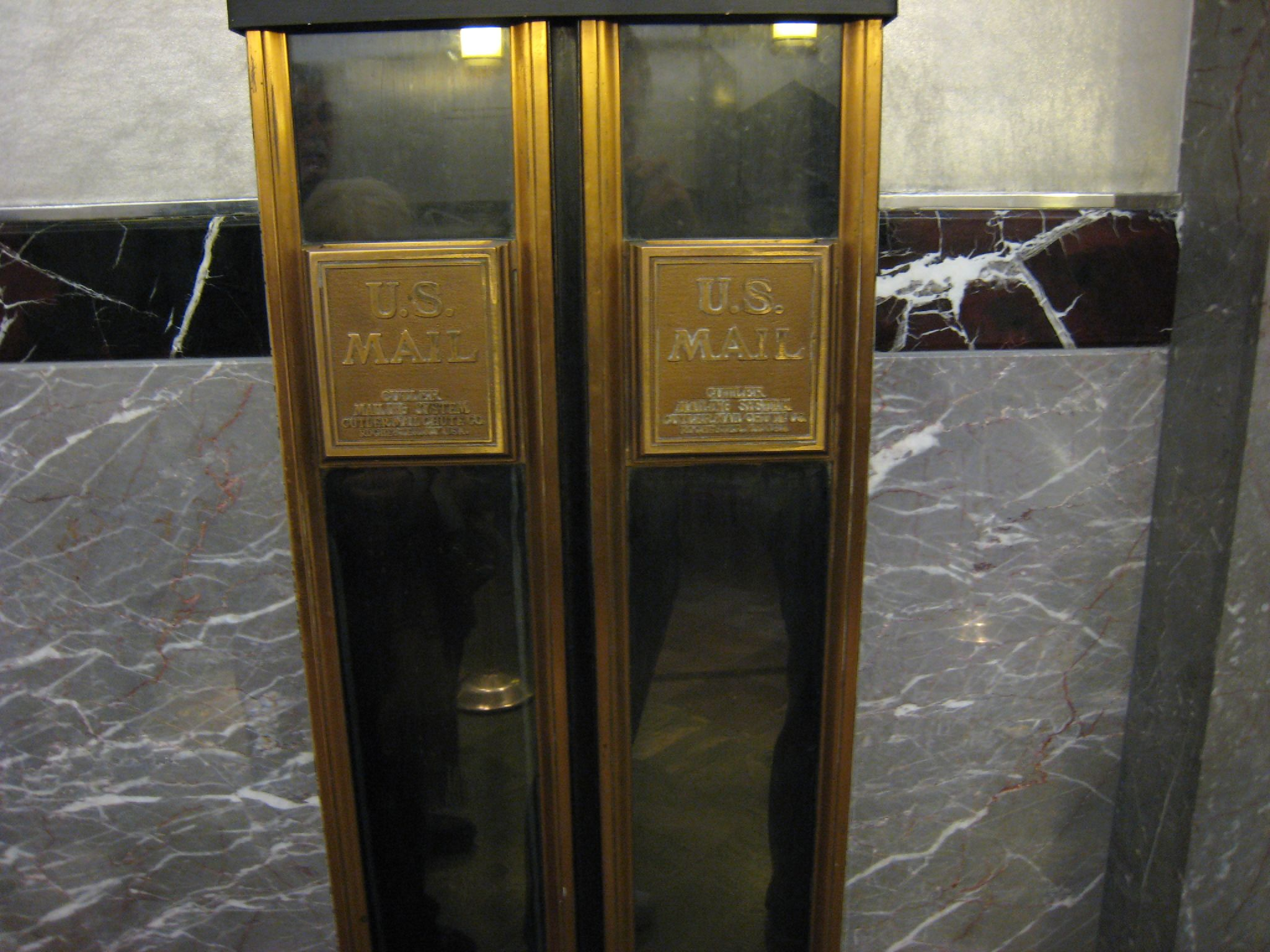
Empire State Building active mail chutes, 2007

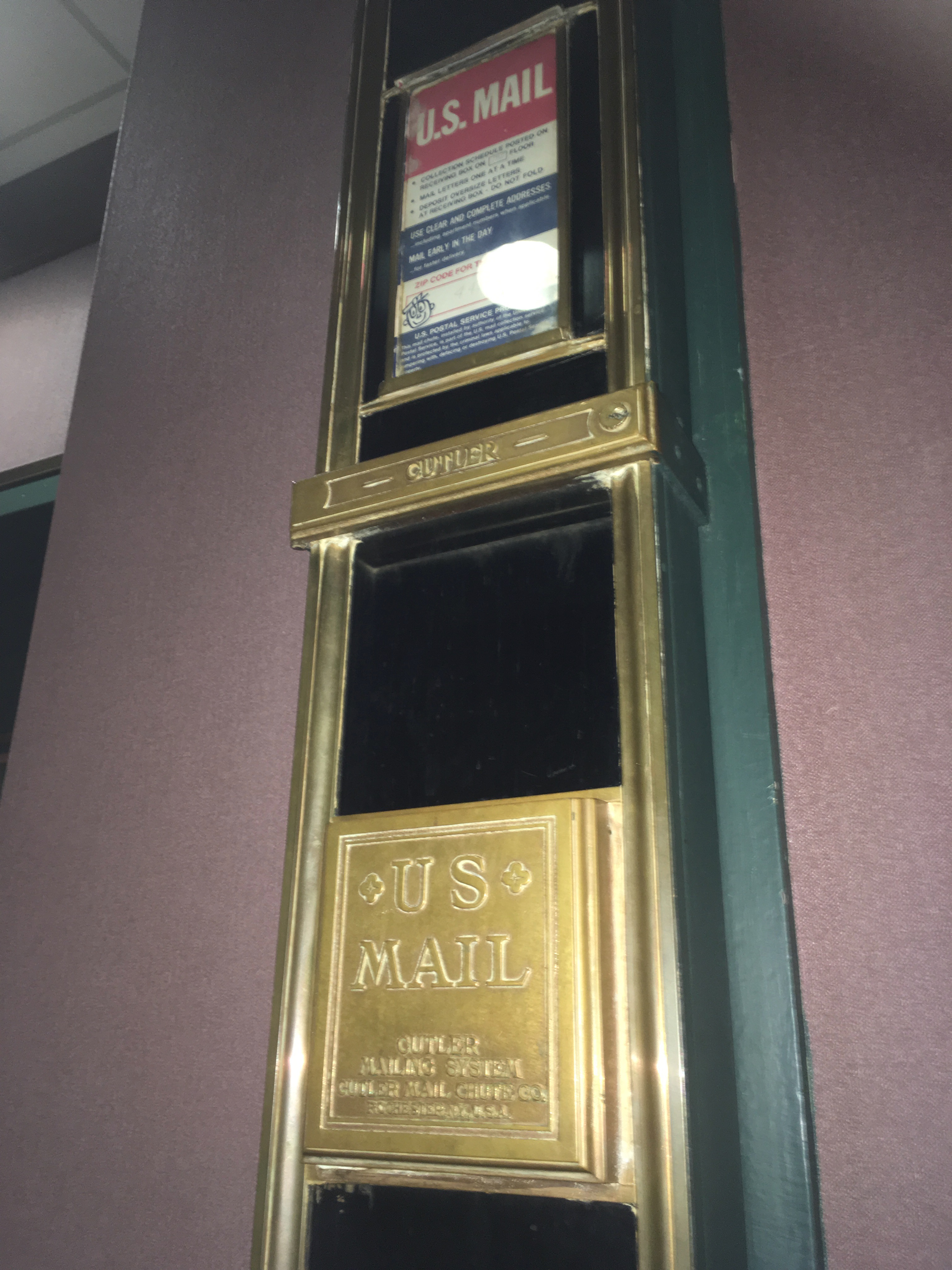
Akron, Ohio, Law Building active mail chute, 2019

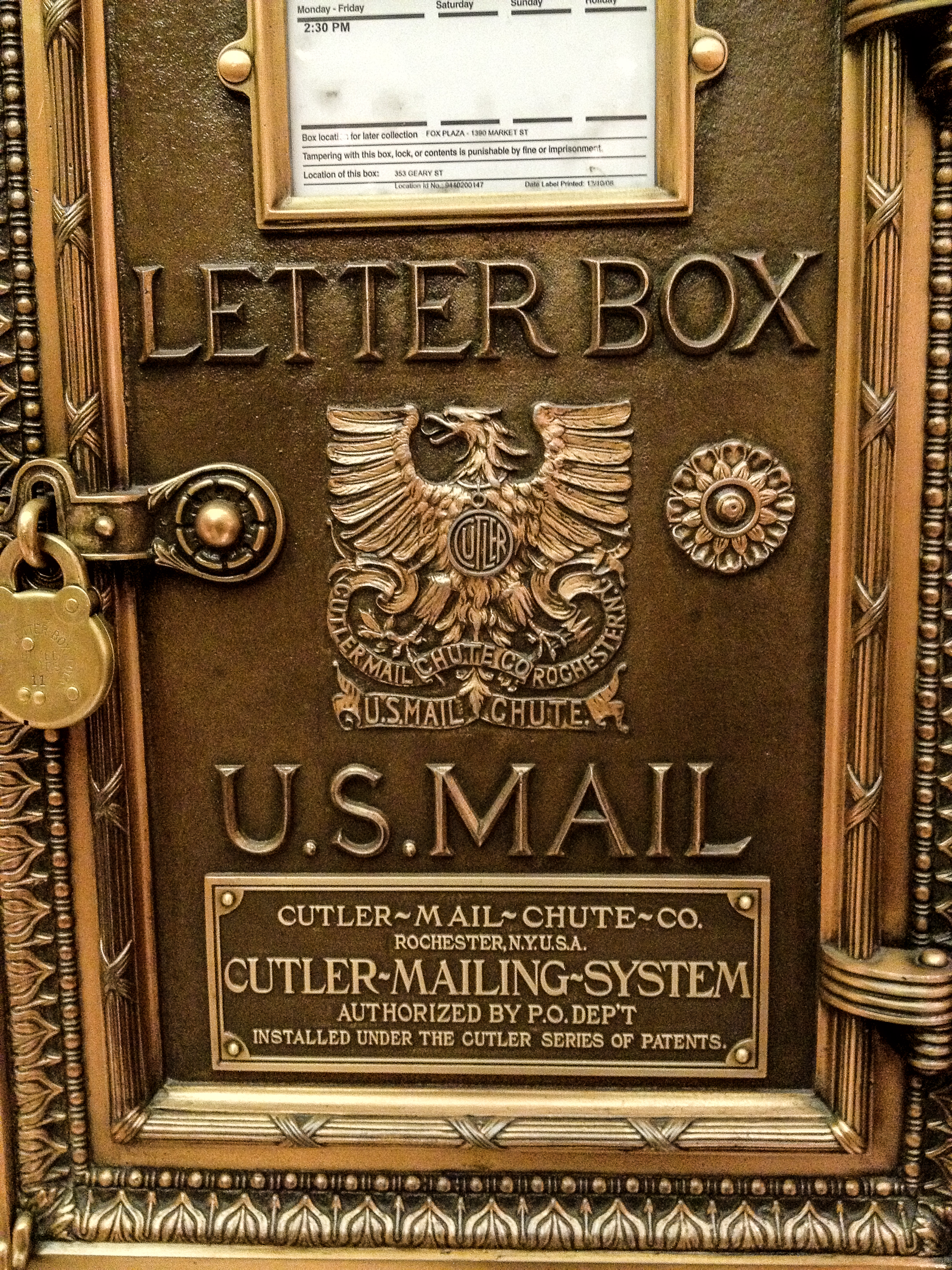
Cutler letter box with door hinges, 2012

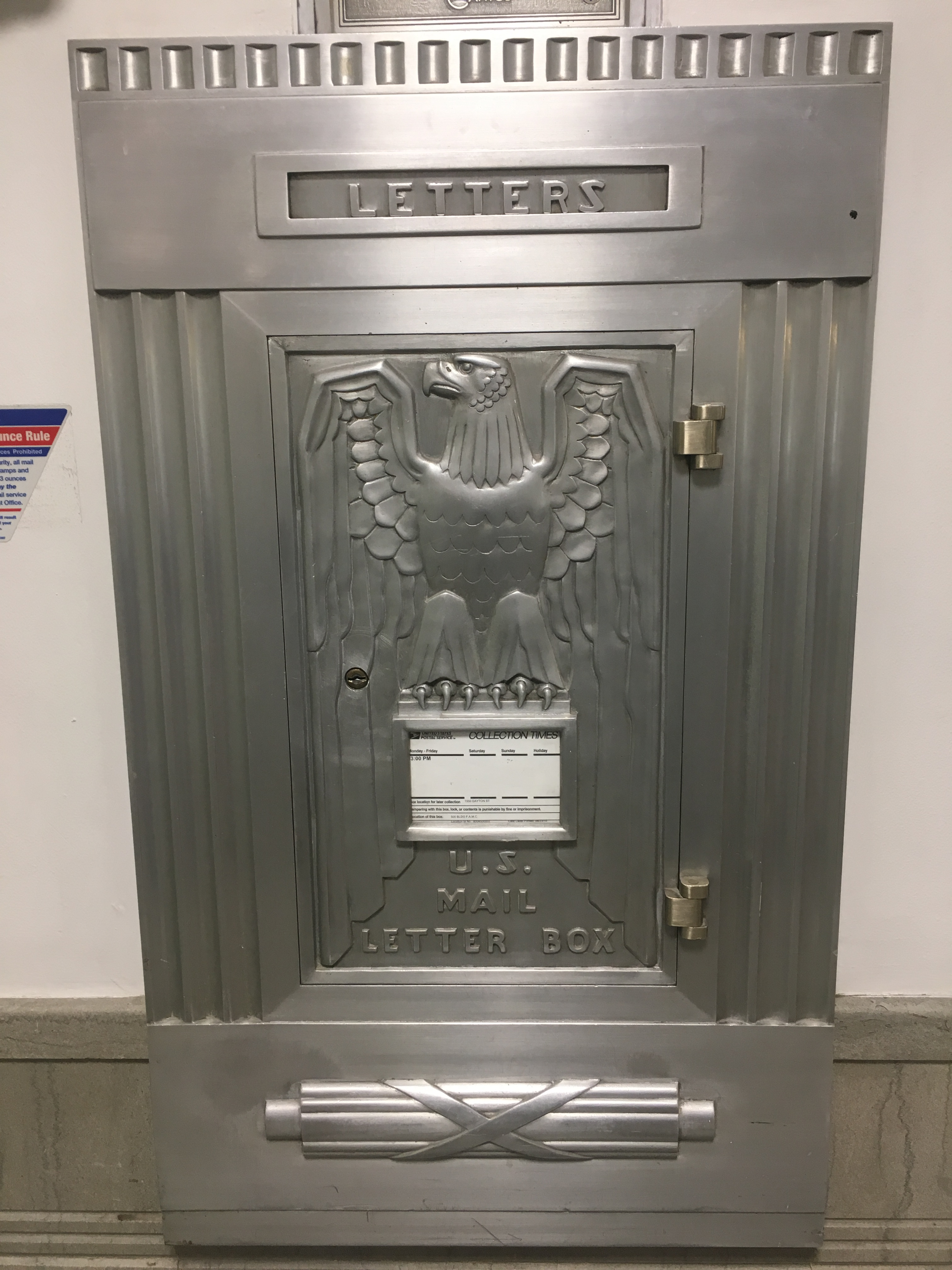
A metal receiving box for letters places in the mail chute system on each of the eight floors of Fitzsimons Army Hospital.

A mail chute is a device by which mail is collected for pick-up by a post office from within high-rise buildings, such as offices, hospitals, and hotels. Deposit boxes on upper floors are connected via a chute to a central depository at ground level, from which the mail is picked up.

The mail chute was patented by James Goold Cutler, an architect from Rochester, New York, in 1883. A company founded by Cutler would become the principal manufacturer of such systems for new hotels, apartment buildings, and offices, defending the original patent and modifications. Use of the mail chute declined with the advent of modern mailrooms designed to more efficiently handle increased volumes of mail and issues that could be caused by clogs or letters falling through. In 1997, the National Fire Protection Association updated its voluntary codes to ban new chute installations, as the vertical shafts could spread smoke in the event of fire. However, thousands of existing mail chutes continue in use, including hundreds in New York City alone.

== Design ==
On September 11, 1883, James Goold Cutler received U.S. patent 284,951, for a system connecting deposit boxes on multiple floors to a single ground-floor receptacle; the chute had to have a front of at least three-fourths glass to allow for the identification of mail clogs, and, if installed at a height of greater than two stories, an elastic cushion was to be fitted in the receptacle to "prevent injury to the mail".

The design of chute letter boxes also evolved over time to fit architectural styles and become less utilitarian.

== History ==
In 1884, a year after Cutler obtained his patent, the first such system was installed in the Cutler-designed Elwood Building in Rochester, with the goal of saving tenants the hassle of depositing mail in a box on the street. It was well received, winning awards at 1884's World Cotton Centennial in New Orleans and an exhibition the same year in Cincinnati, but federal law of the time only permitted the placement of mailboxes in public buildings, such as government offices, hotels, theatres, and rail stations; thus, postmen refused to mail the collected letters. In 1893, under revised postal laws, chutes came under the regulatory authority of the United States Post Office Department. As a result, all repairs to malfunctioning chute systems had to be undertaken by post office-approved engineers, a problem in smaller cities (such as Rochester) where the post office did not employ mechanics.

In 1884, the same year as the Elwood installation, the Cutler Manufacturing Company was incorporated by James Goold Cutler and his brother, J. Warren Cutler. Cutler contracted some of the work of producing systems to the Yawman & Erbe Manufacturing Company, which continued to work for Cutler until the company built its own factory on Anderson Avenue in 1908. By 1905, some 1,600 chutes had been installed as a boom in skyscraper construction dovetailed with the new invention. Cutler's firm remained the sole manufacturer of chute systems until 1904, when the Post Office Department permitted competitors. In 1905, the Automatic Mail Delivery Company of New York City started making chutes; Cutler sued for patent infringement and won the case. The two firms then merged in 1909 as the Cutler Mail Chute Company, headquartered out of offices in Rochester and the New York Times Building in New York City. The next year, the Cutler Mail Chute Company won a patent infringement lawsuit against the United States Mail Chute Equipment Company. The firm's grip on the technology was so firm that in 1911, a competitor testified at a congressional hearing that "every architect and builder in the country has rebelled for years against the prices they have been forced to pay for mail chutes to the Cutler Co."; even in 1961, after the original patent and those for later improvements expired, Cutler was said to hold 70 percent of the market. James Goold Cutler stepped aside in 1915, when a Maine-domiciled holding company acquired the New York firm, and J. Warren Cutler was named president.

London's Savoy Hotel featured the first installation of a Cutler chute in England when it was expanded in 1904. The Canadian Cutler Mail Chute Company Limited was incorporated in Montreal in 1910. By 1920, Cutler mail chutes had been installed in buildings in countries including Mexico, Cuba, Japan, South Africa, India, and Australia.

In 1958, the Federal Equipment Company of Carlisle, Pennsylvania, purchased the Cutler Mail Chute Company, which maintained a Rochester-area presence in Honeoye Falls until 1974. Federal Equipment produced equipment for post offices. The firm was known as Cutler-Federal, Inc., after 1959, and engaged in the creation of automated sorting equipment and pneumatic tube systems. Cutler was acquired by the Florence Corporation, a manufacturer of mailboxes, in 2000, and this firm was purchased by Gibraltar Industries of Buffalo, New York, in 2007.

The introduction of modern building mailrooms to handle larger volumes of mail led to chutes falling out of favor, particularly after 1980. In 1997, the National Fire Protection Association banned the construction of new mail chutes because smoke could spread among floors through their vertical shafts, much as with chimneys. By 2001, 900 chutes were in active use in New York City and another 360 in Chicago, though some buildings had discontinued their use; buildings such as the Chrysler Building and McGraw-Hill Building had experienced jams, including in the case of the latter a 1986 clog blocking the passage of 40,000 pieces of mail, while the John Hancock Center shuttered its chutes because of increased volume. In 1999, the New York City district of the United States Postal Service responded to at least two calls a week to clear mail chutes that were hung up with stuck mail. In rare cases, items could remain stuck for decades; in 1995, a widow received a love letter and other correspondence that had been caught in a Cutler mail chute 50 years prior, and several items intended to be mailed at the Wilkes-Barre City Hall in Pennsylvania in 1923 were discovered in 1980.

== See also ==
- Pneumatic tube § In postal service
- Rota (architecture)
