= Cascade Plaza, Akron =

Cascade Plaza
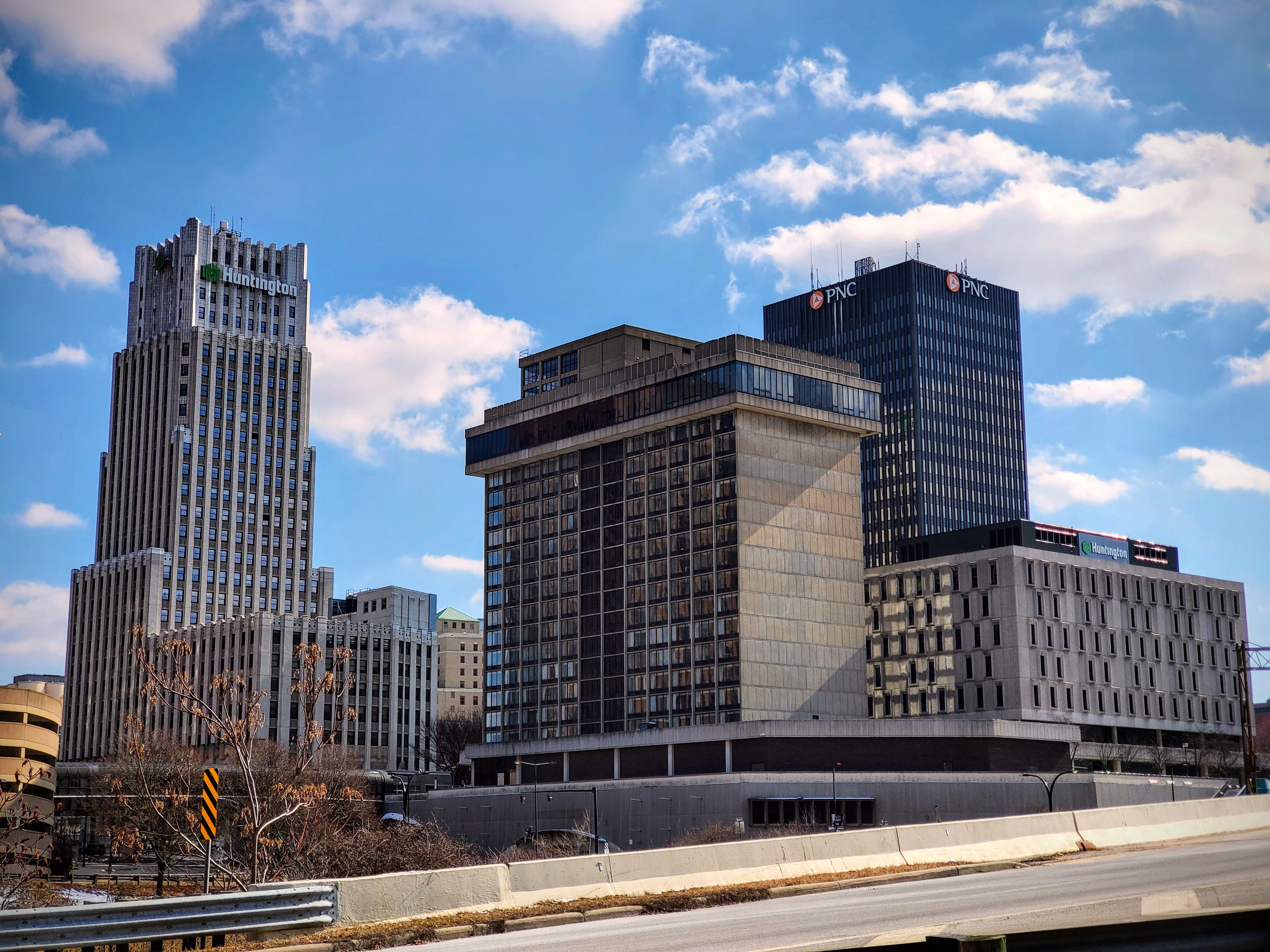
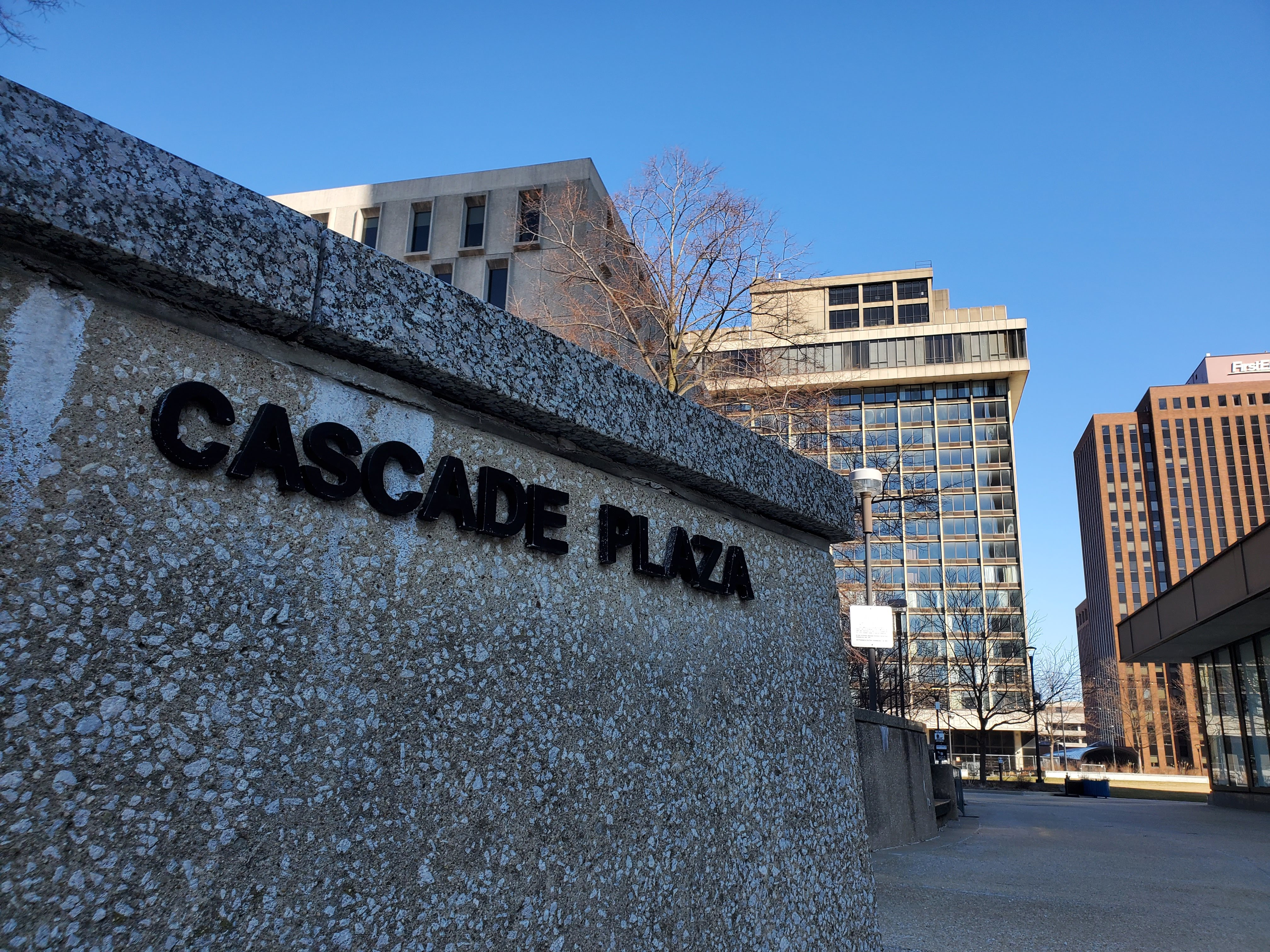
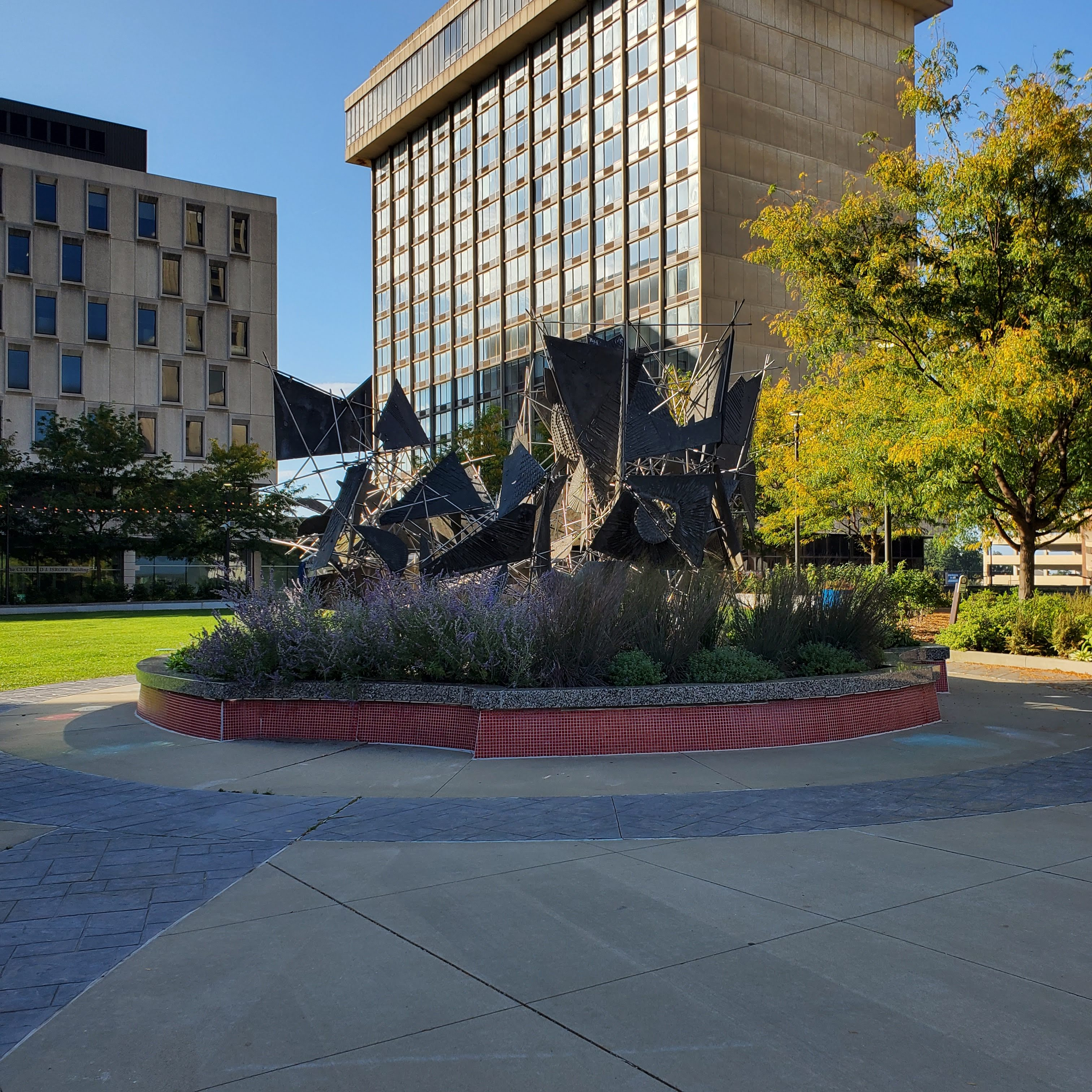
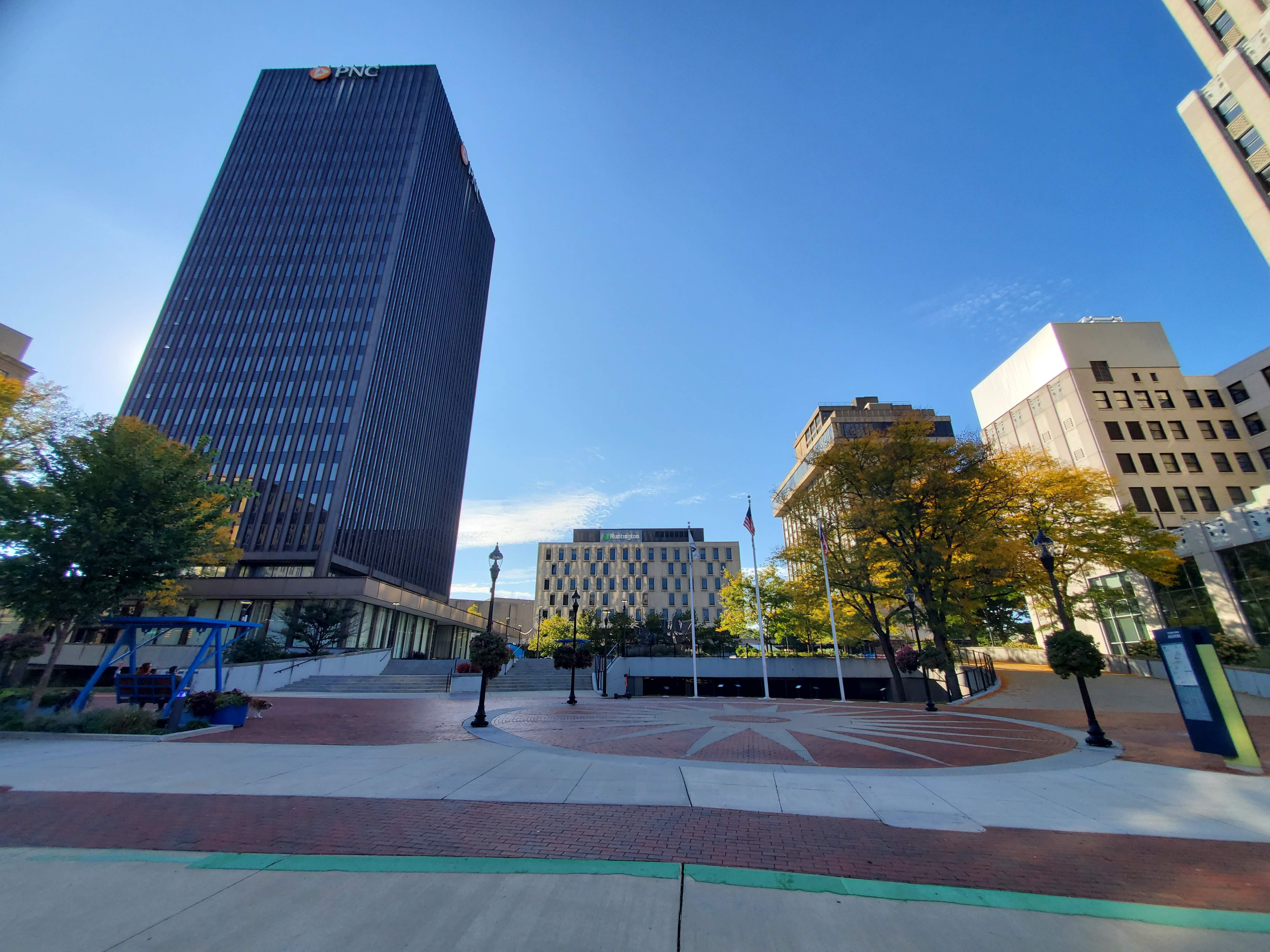
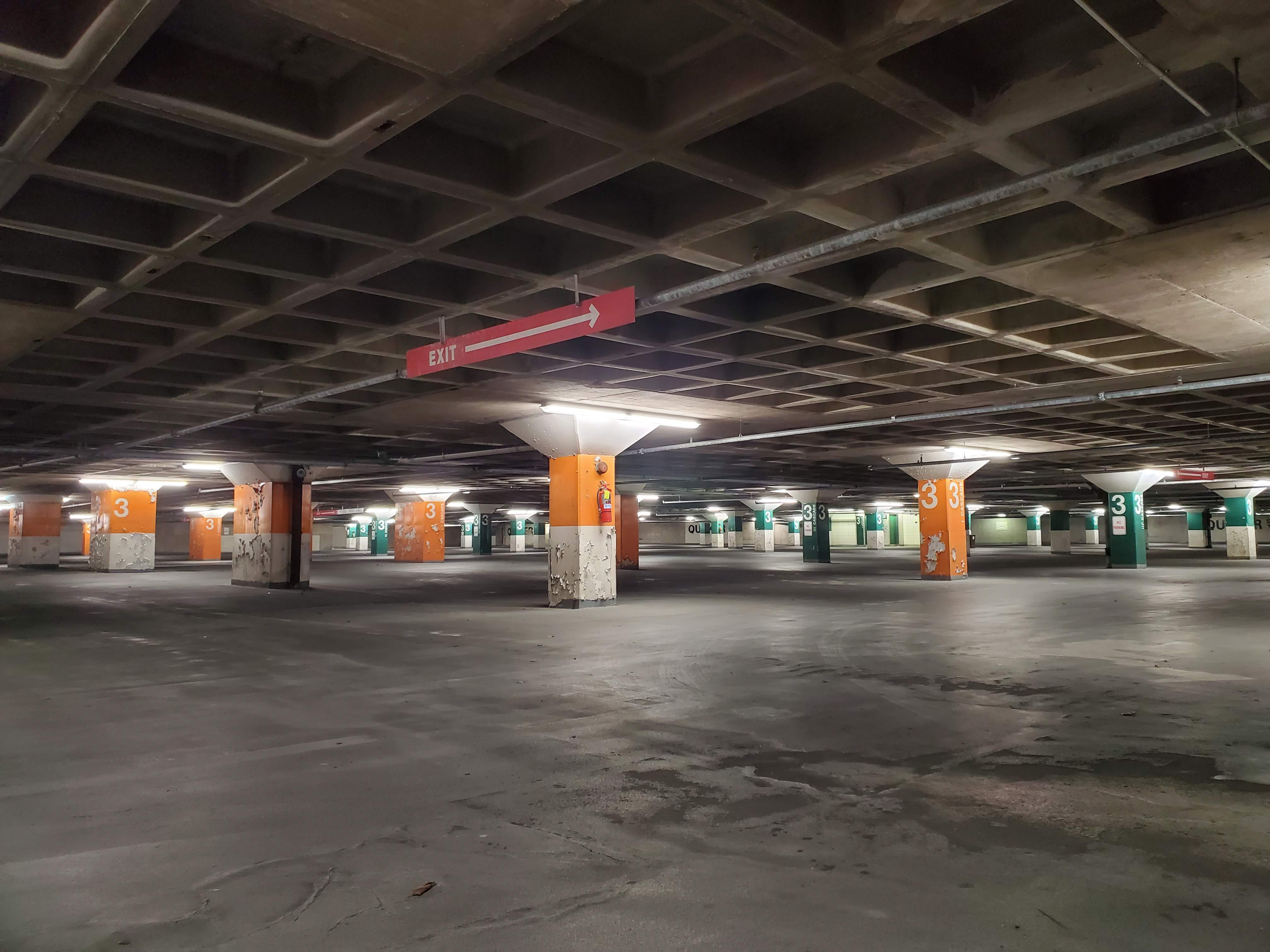
- Left to right, Huntington Tower, Akron City Center Hotel, Three Cascade Plaza (low rise), and the PNC Building. Cascade Plaza Plaque Don Drumm Sculpture View of the plaza from Main Street Parking deck beneath the plaza

- Location within Ohio
- 41.082222°N 81.519168°W
- Location: Akron, Ohio, United States

History
- Built: Late 1960s

Cascade Plaza is an open space with plantings and pedestrian walkways in Akron, Ohio. It was developed in the late 1960s as part of an urban renewal project that also included construction of two high rises. Starting in 2013, a major overhaul to the plaza took place, completed in 2015.

== Location ==
The plaza was built on the site of a five-story flour mill built by Dr. Eliakim Crosby in 1831. A diversion dam was built on the Little Cuyahoga River in Middlebury, from which a canal brought water south down the present Main Street, turning right at Mill Street to deliver power to the mill at Lock Five, where the plaza's hotel is now. The canal also powered other factories. The hamlet of Cascade grew up in the area, with a population of 128 by July 1833, compared to 329 for Akron. The Flatiron Building, a seven-story low rise built in 1907 and demolished in 1967 also stood on the site.

== Plaza ==
The plaza lies on the west side of South Main Street, and forms the roof of a five-level underground parking lot. Lawrence Halprin planned the Cascade Plaza. It was a major urban renewal project covering 2 acres (0.81 ha), which used to feature a central skating rink. The plaza has a fountain sculpture designed by Don Drumm and erected in 1968, overleaf, stainless steel rods with anodized, cast aluminum panels.

== Buildings ==
There are four buildings on the site, linked at the ground level by the plaza: Akron City Center Hotel, Cascade I, Cascade III, and Huntington Tower. The hotel (formerly the Radisson Hotel Akron City Centre) is a 19-story modernist high rise complete in 1969. Cascade I, at One Cascade Plaza and 140 South Main Street, is also called the PNC Center. It is a 23-story steel high-rise completed in 1969. Three Cascade Plaza is a seven-story concrete low-rise, also completed in 1969. Huntington Tower, at 106 King James Way, is a 27-story steel tower with an art deco brick facade completed in 1931.

== Plans ==
In October 2013 the Akron City Council voted to approve a complete overhaul of the plaza, partly funded by the city and partly by FirstMerit Corporation, a bank. The plan was to demolish the concrete plaza, then reseal the deck and convert it to green space, open to the street. The new space would have plants, benches and tables. The overhaul was completed in 2015, but a project to repair the Cascade Plaza Parking Deck was approved in 2024.

== Gallery ==
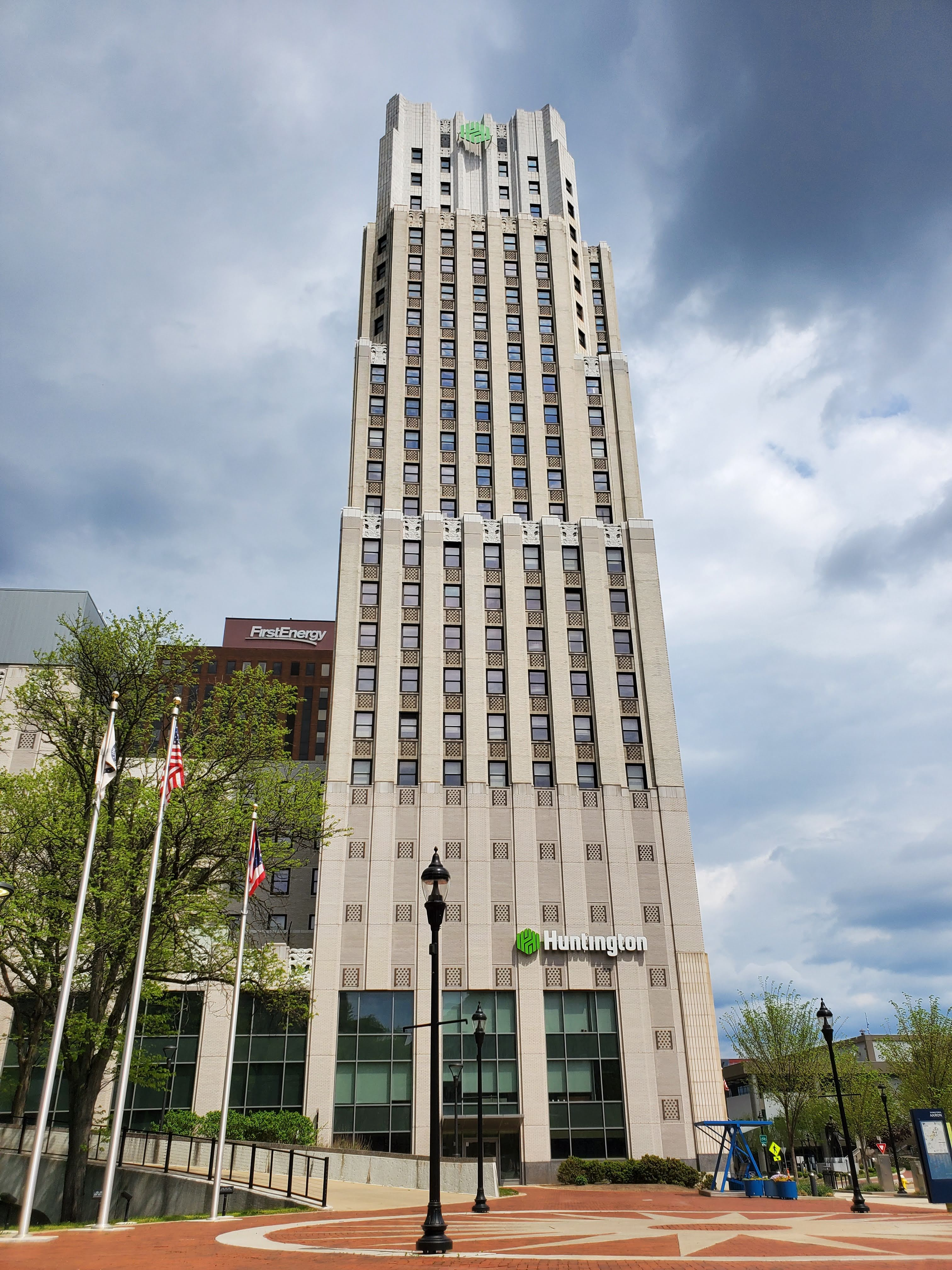
Huntington Tower, the tallest building in Akron, is located at the plaza.

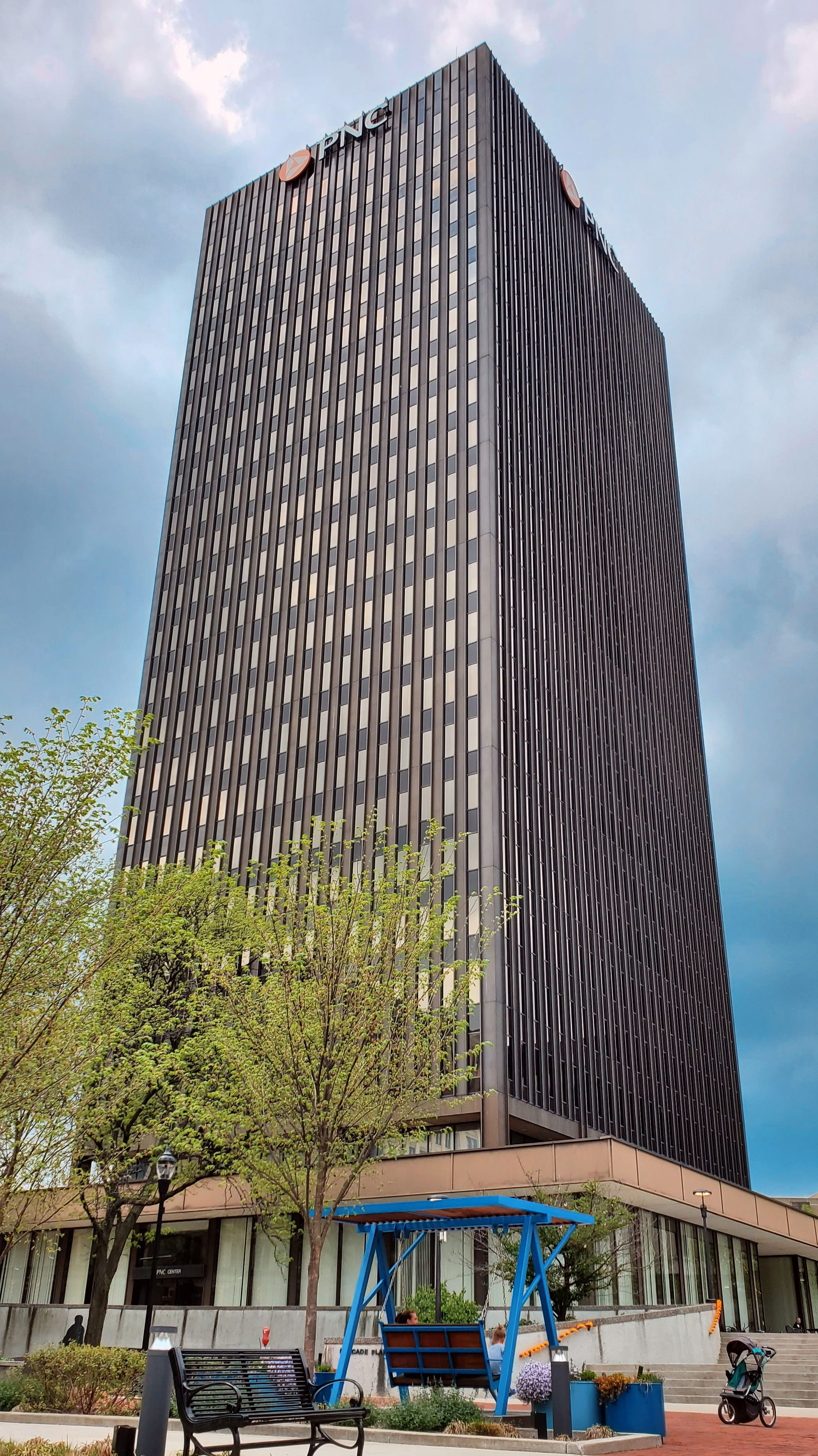
Cascade I, also known as the PNC Center, occupies the left corner of the plaza near Main and Bowery.

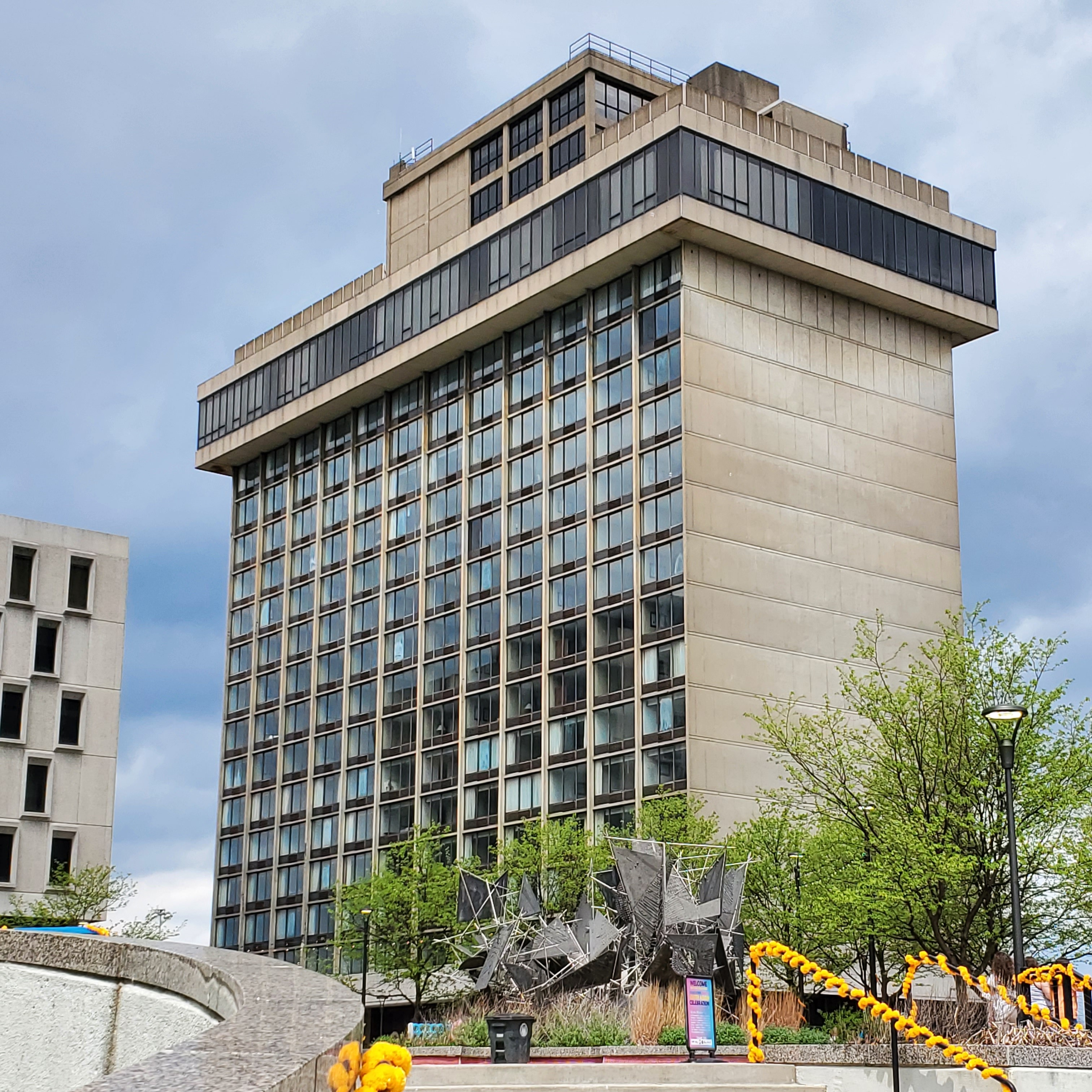
The abandoned Akron City Center Hotel occupies the far-right corner of the plaza near Mill Street.

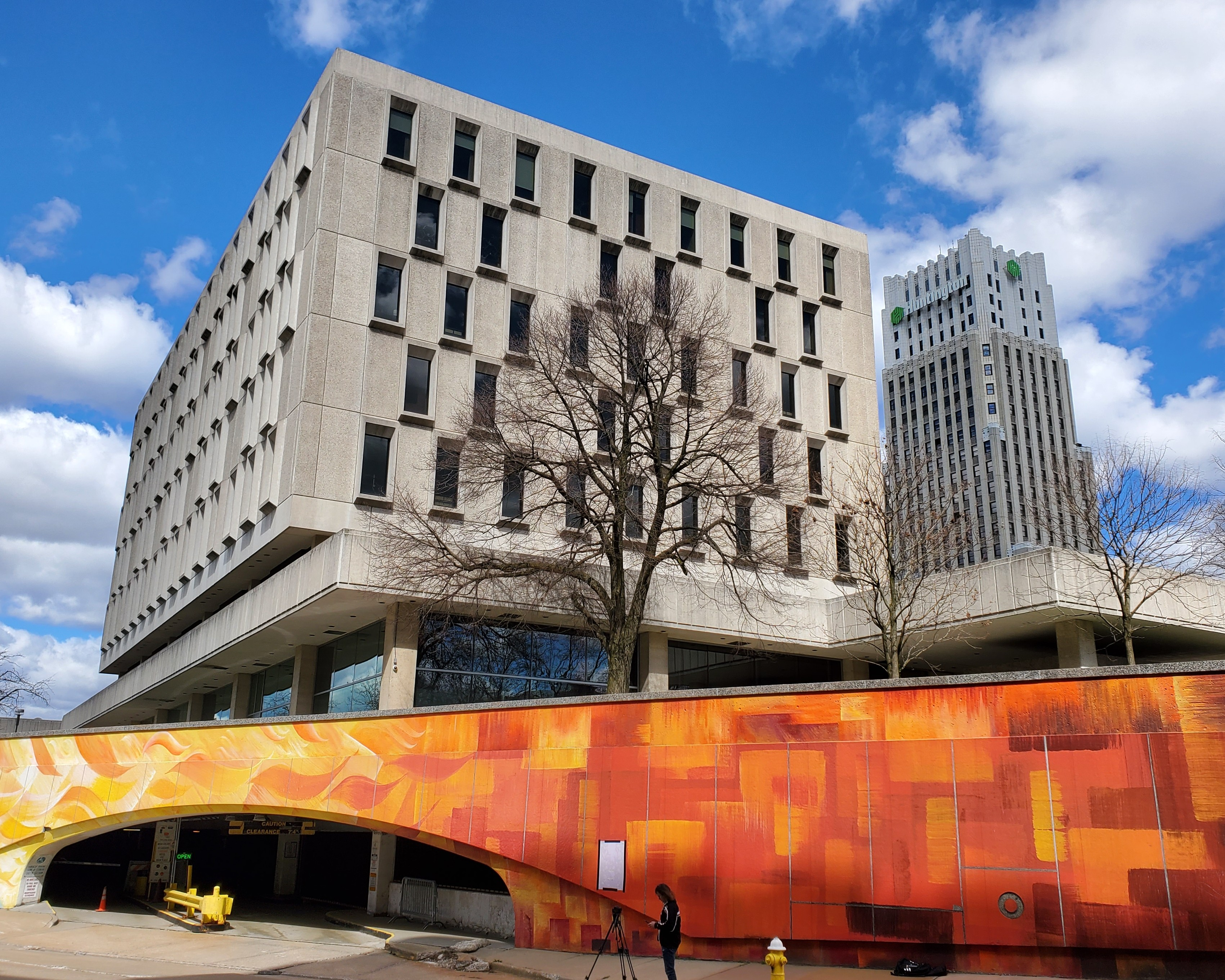
Cascade III serves as secondary Huntington offices, and is located in the far-center of the plaza, near Quaker Street.

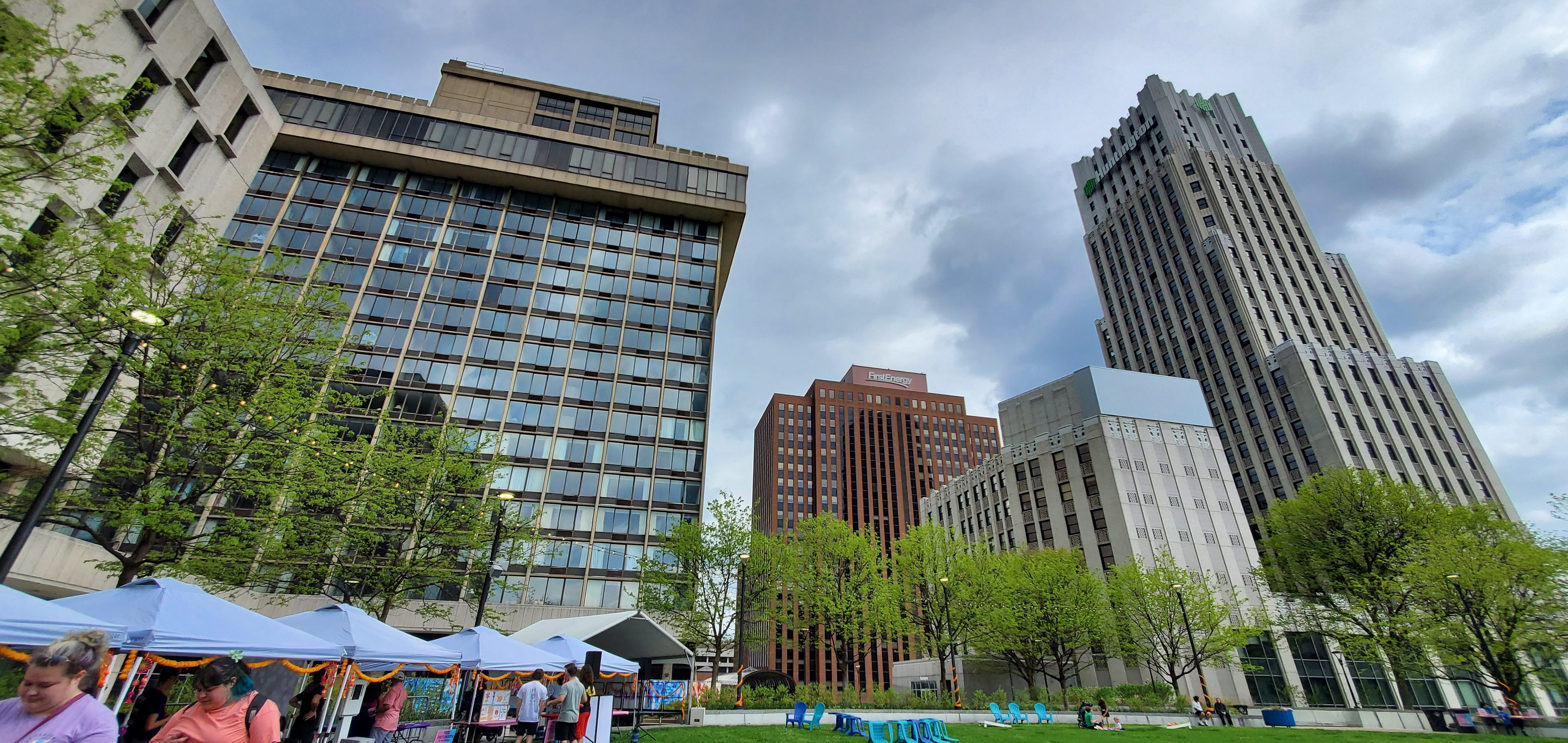
Looking north from Cascade Plaza, with Cascade III, Akron City Center Hotel, Huntington Tower, and First Energy Tower visible.

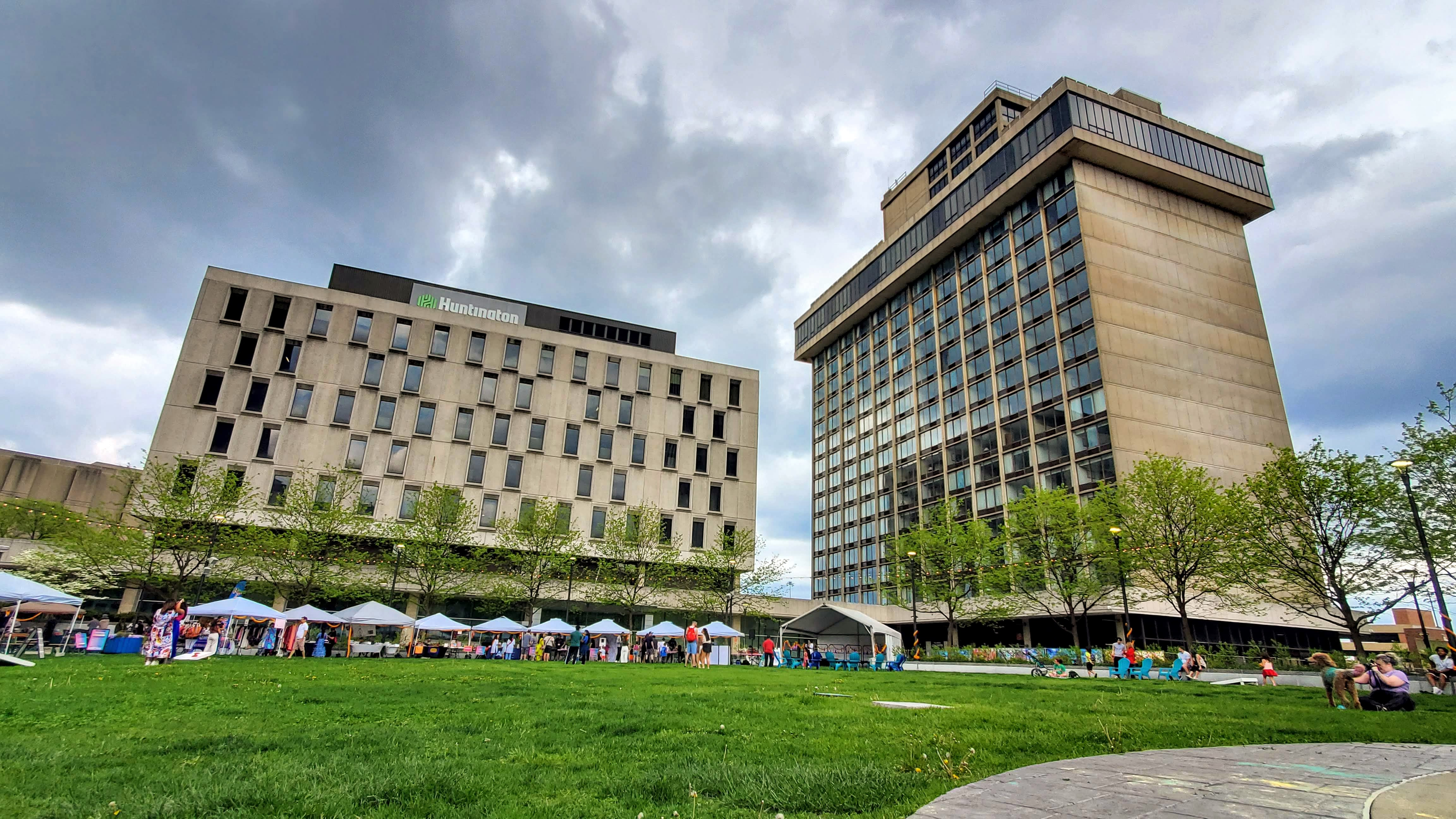
Cascade III and Akron City Center Hotel flank the grassy recreational area of the plaza.

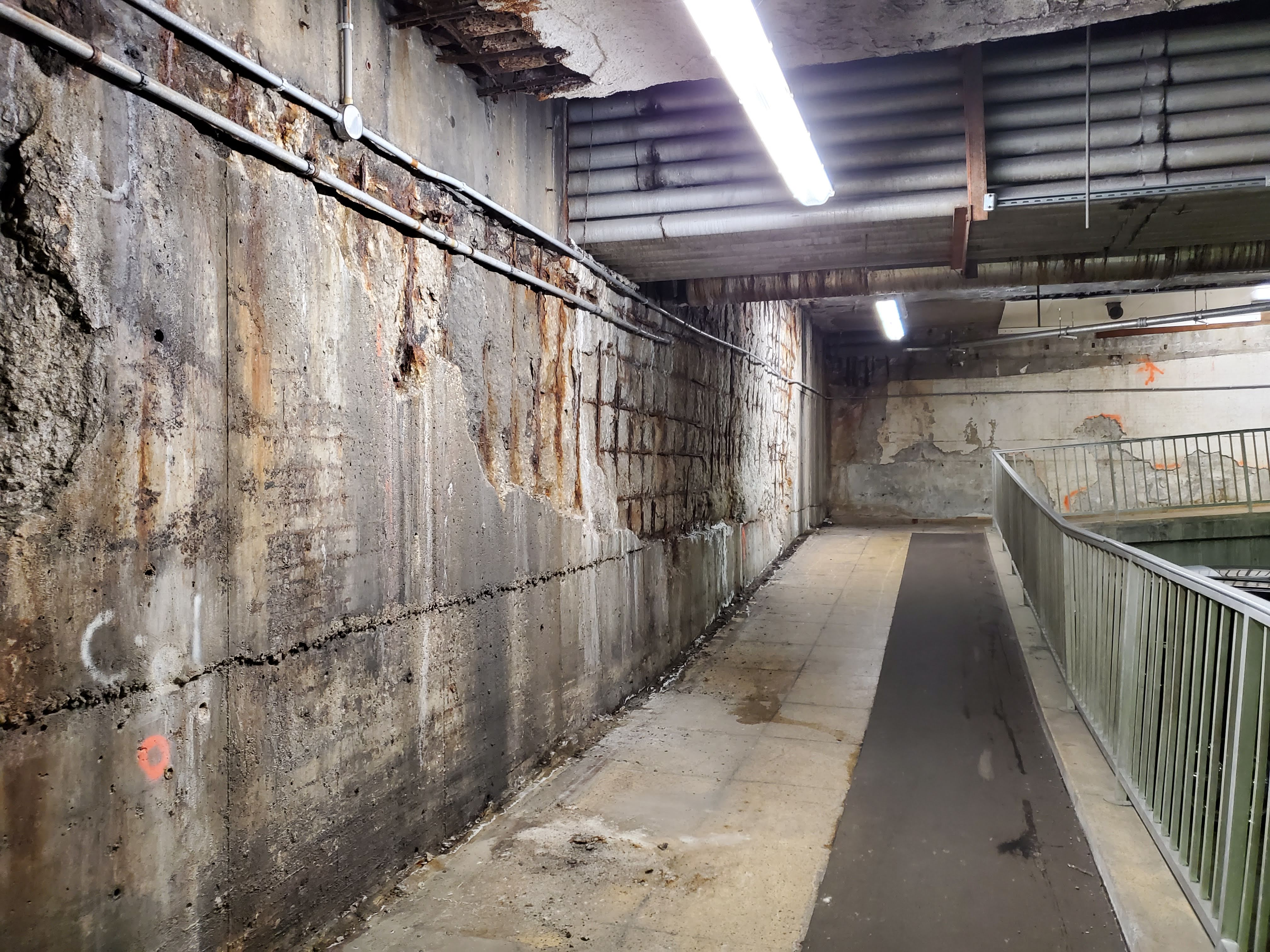
Decaying section of the parking deck beneath the plaza, subject to upcoming repairs.

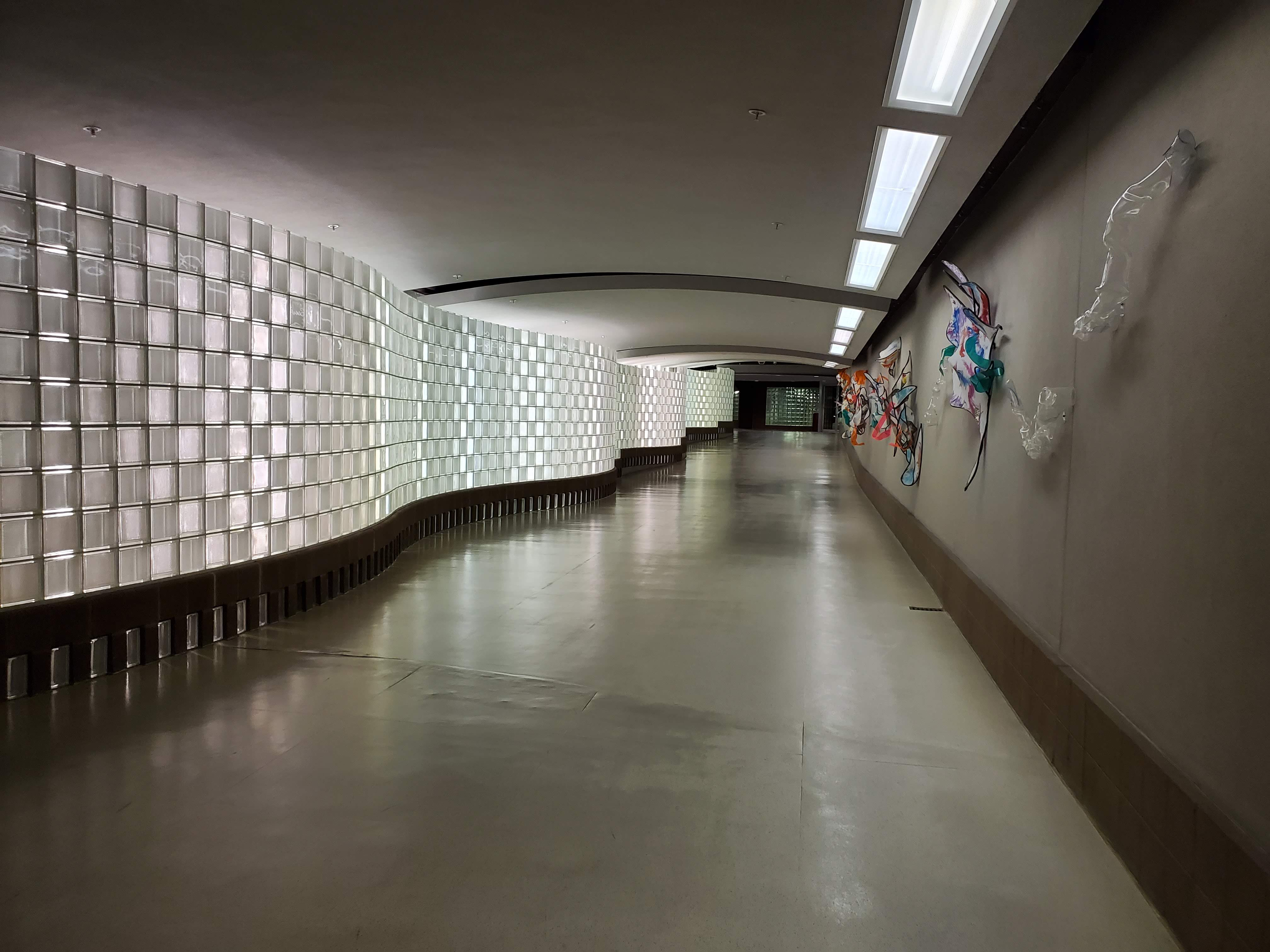
Tunnel beneath Main Street, which connects the plaza to Main Place and to the rest of the Akron sky-walks.

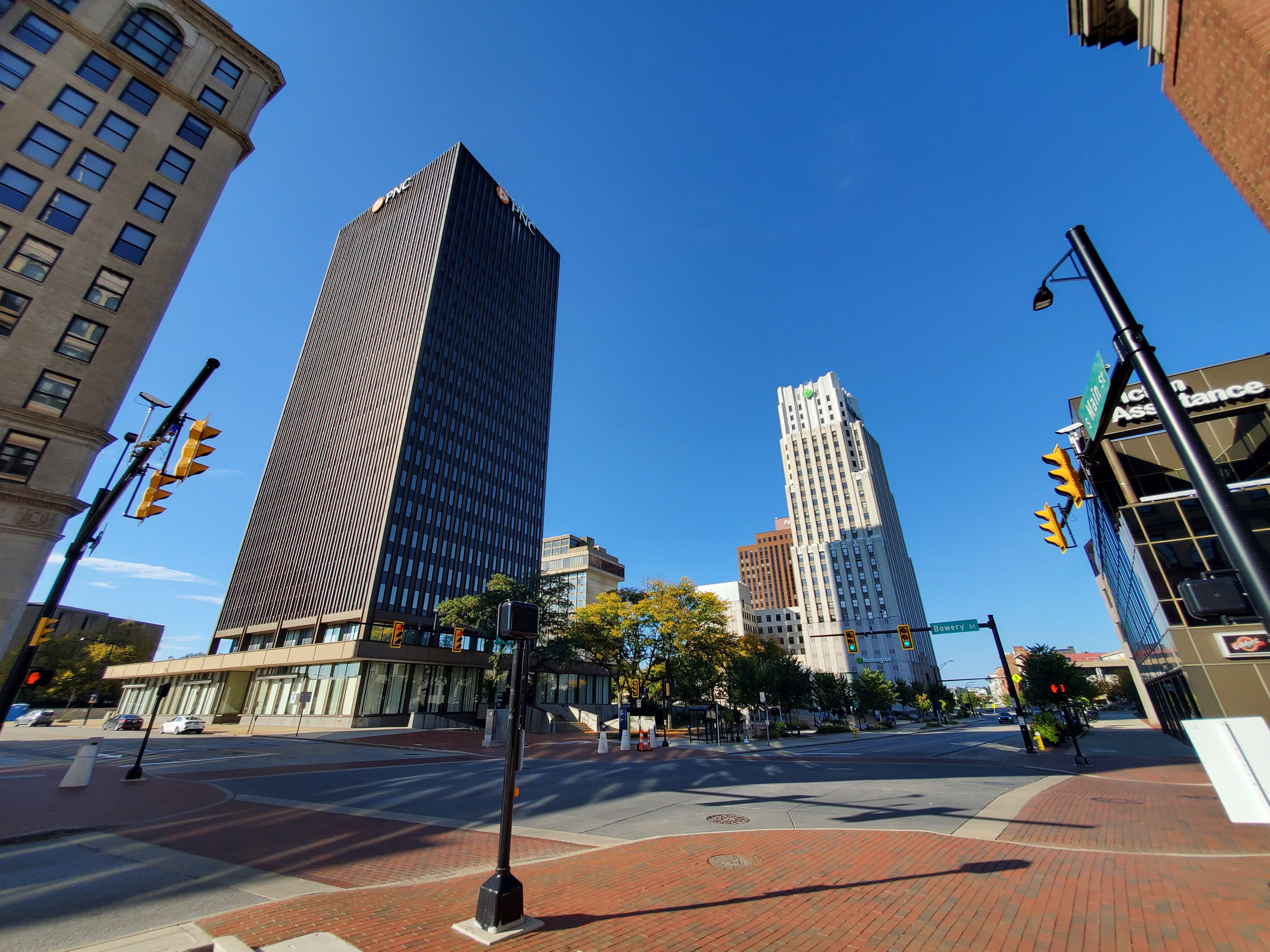
View of Cascade Plaza from Main and Bowery, with the PNC Center, Akron City Center Hotel, and Huntington Tower visible.
