= Akron City Center Hotel =

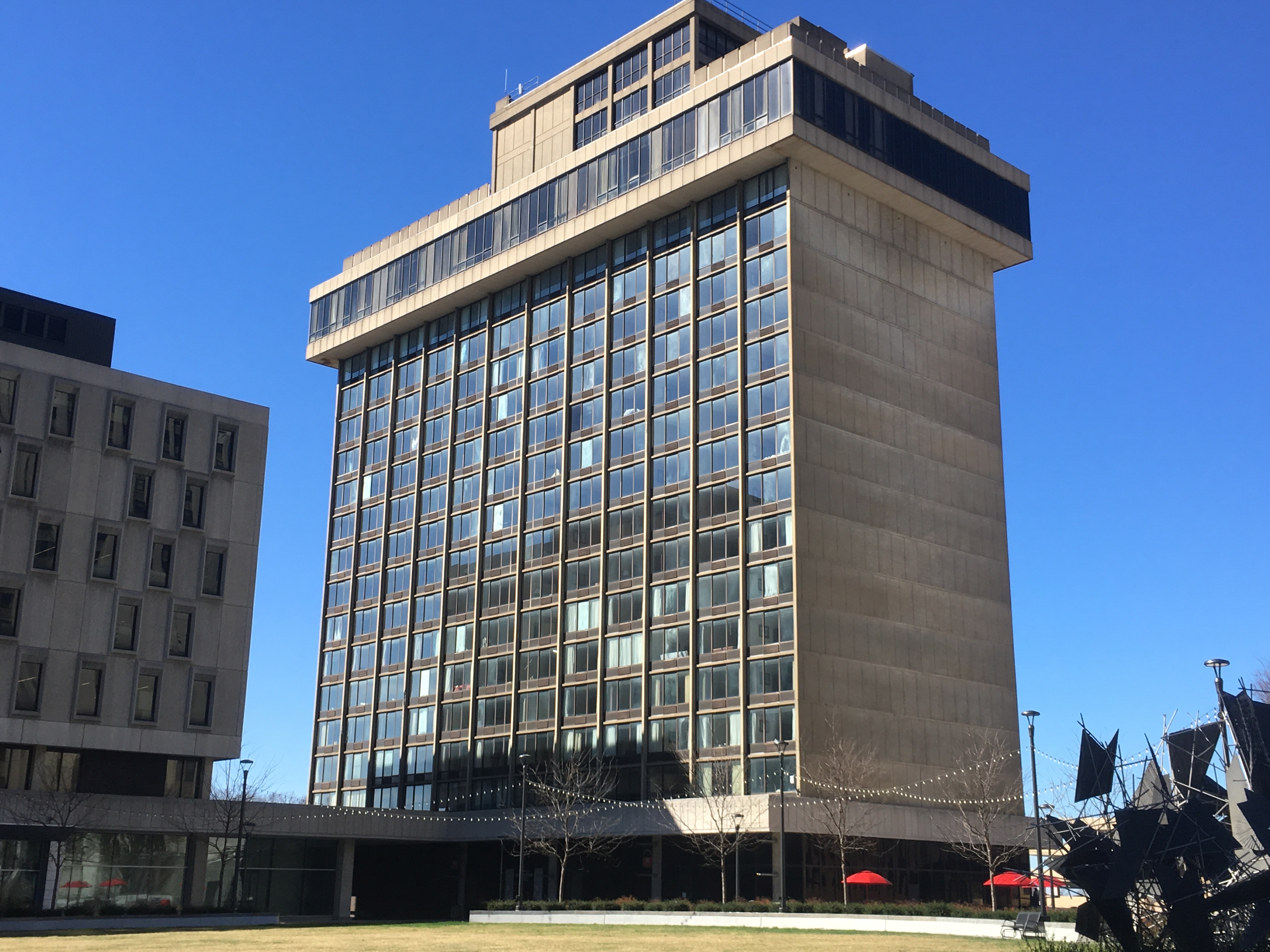
- Interactive map of the Akron City Center Hotel area
- Former names: Cascade Holiday Inn (1971-1991); Ramada Plaza Hotel (1996-1998); Radisson Hotel Akron City Centre (1998-c. 2008)
- Hotel chain: Holiday Inn (1971-1991); Ramada (1996-1998); Radisson (1998-c. 2008)

General information
- Coordinates: 41°4′58″N 81°31′11″W
- Construction started: June 1970
- Opened: 1971

Technical details
- Floor count: 18

Other information
- Number of rooms: 306

The Akron City Center Hotel is an 18-story former hotel building in downtown Akron, Ohio. The 306-room hotel structure is the fifth-tallest in the city. It was constructed beginning in June 1970 as part of Cascade Plaza, an urban renewal project, and opened in 1971 as the Cascade Holiday Inn.

Two lower floors of the building are part of the five-level underground Cascade Parking Garage, which opened in 1968. The hotel cost $6.6 million (equivalent to $52.5 million in 2025), constructed by the Ruhlin Construction Co. for a Columbus-based developer. During its construction, the nearby Mayflower Hotel closed, in May 1971, knowing the older hotel could not compete with the new structure. In 1991, the building lost its Holiday Inn franchise and became the Cascade Plaza Hotel. In 1993, a partnership purchased the building, and in 1996 it opened as the Ramada Plaza Hotel, after a total renovation. In 1998, it became the Radisson Hotel Akron City Centre. After another decade, it became the Akron City Center Hotel. The hotel closed in the winter of 2016–2017, and its contents were liquidated. A developer proposed converting the building to become residential around 2018, but the COVID-19 pandemic affected the plans. As of 2024, the building sits vacant.

The hotel building was designed by William Bond Jr. and Associates, a Memphis company that designed all Holiday Inns. The work was likened to a "baby United Nations building".
