= Citizens Republic Bancorp =

American bank

- Formerly: Citizens National Bank; Citizens Commercial & Savings Bank
- Company type: Public
- Traded as: Nasdaq: CRBC
- Industry: Banking; financial services; investment
- Predecessor: Citizens Banking Corporation; Republic Bancorp, Inc.
- Founded: 1871; 155 years ago
- Defunct: April 12, 2013
- Fate: Merged with FirstMerit Corporation
- Successor: FirstMerit Corporation
- Headquarters: Flint, MI, USA
- Number of locations: 220 (2012)
- Area served: Michigan; Wisconsin; Indiana; Ohio
- Key people: David T. Dort (board director 1966-2005); Cathy Nash (CEO 2009-2013)
- Products: Retail Banking; Commercial bank; Private Banking; Mortgage loan
- Services: Financial services
- Net income: ▲$347 million (2012)
- Total assets: ▲$9.586 billion (2012)
- Total equity: ▲$1.370 billion (2012)
- Number of employees: 1,977 (2012)
- Parent: FirstMerit Corporation (2012-2013)
- Subsidiaries: F&M Bancorporation (1999-2005)

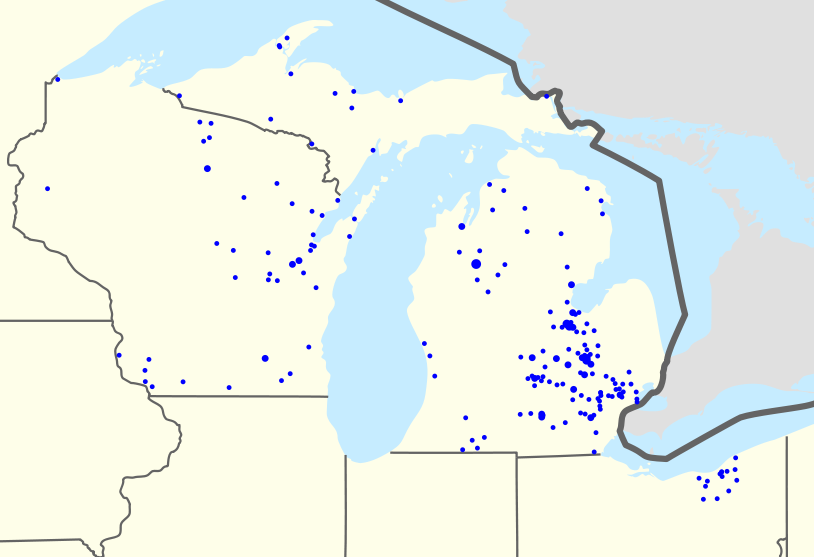
Citizens Republic's footprint

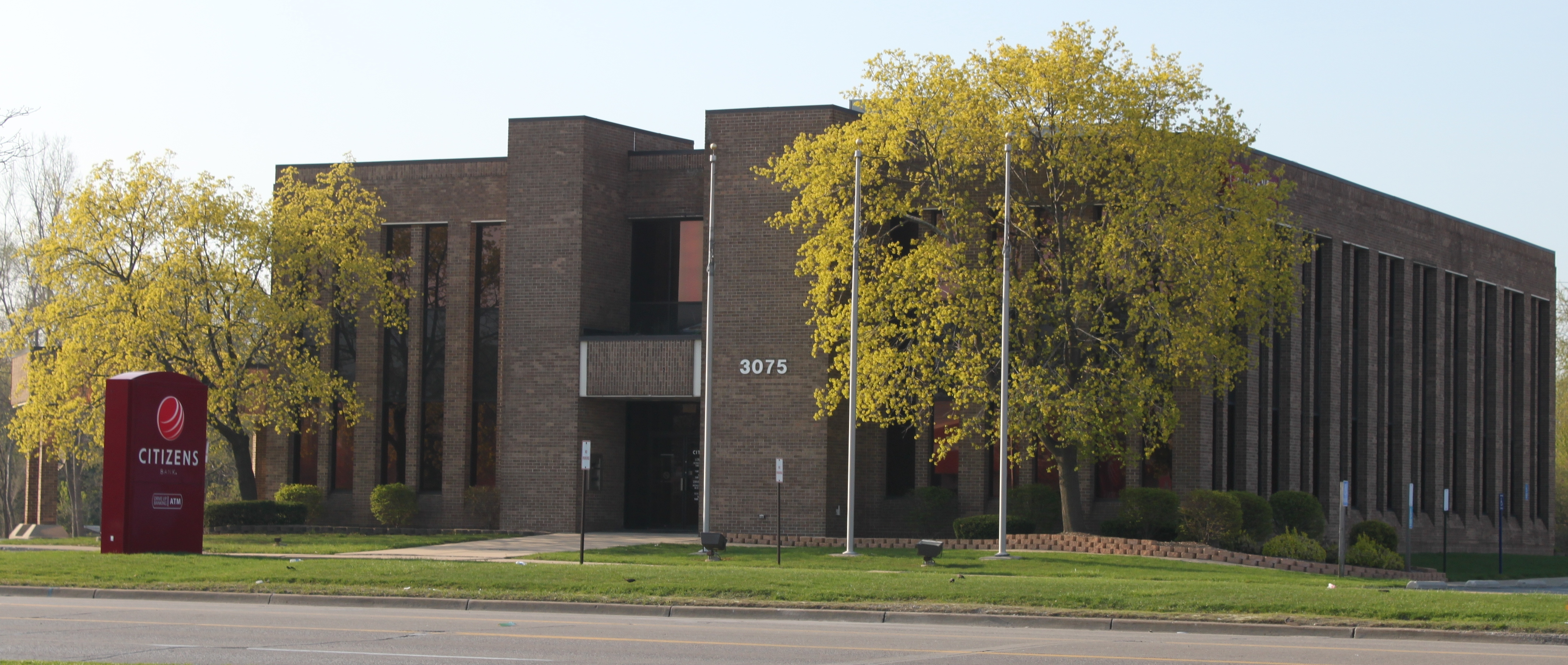
Citizens Bank branch in Ypsilanti, Michigan

Citizens Republic Bancorp was a bank holding company for Citizens Bank, headquartered in Flint, Michigan. It merged with FirstMerit Bank in June 2013. It operated 219 branches and 248 ATMs in Michigan, Wisconsin, and Ohio. FirstMerit merged with Huntington Bancshares in 2016.

== History ==
=== Citizens National Bank ===
Citizens National Bank was established in 1871 at the height of Flint's great lumber industry. Citizens National Bank played a key role in the development of the auto industry in the United States. General Motors founder William C. Durant acknowledged that a loan he and partner J. Dallas Dort received from Citizens in 1886 enabled him to start his vehicle manufacturing company now known as General Motors.

=== Citizens Commercial & Savings Bank ===
Citizens National Bank switched from a national to a state-chartered institution in 1890 as Citizens Commercial & Savings Bank. In 1928, the original bank building was demolished and the a new headquarters building, Citizens Bank Building, was built on the site. In 1937, the Bank began its annual Citizens' Holiday Sing.

The Weather Ball on the bank headquarters was first illuminated August 30, 1956. The ball is a regular beacon in the city except from 1974 until January 1, 1978, when it was turned off during the 1970s energy crisis.

=== Citizens Banking Corporation ===
Citizens Commercial & Savings Bank formed a holding company, Citizens Banking Corporation, in 1981 to acquire additional banks. Banks acquired were Grayling State Bank and State Bank of Standish in 1984.

In 1985, Citizens Banking acquired Second National Corporation, owner of Second National Bank of Saginaw and Second National Bank of Bay City, for $68.3 million.

In November 1986, Citizens Banking announced the acquisition of National Bank of Illinois / Commercial National Bank of Berwyn, Illinois as its first non-Michigan acquisition.

David T. Dort, son of J. Dallas Dort, retired April 10, 1988, as the longest-serving director of Citizen Banking Corp. after 22 years.

On April 8, 1991, Citizens Banking designated $15 million in loans for small businesses in county's poor and minority communities over three years. The bank purchased Bishop International Airport expansion bonds January 15, 1992, saving the airport $2 million on a $34 million project. On February 18, 1992, Citizens pledged $15,000 toward construction of the Robert M. Perry School of Banking building at Central Michigan University.

Citizens acquired Royal Bank Group on October 1, 1993.

It acquired four Michigan locations of Banc One on February 28, 1995.

Citizens acquired CB Financial on July 1, 1997.

In the last quarter of 1999, Citizens purchased 17 branches from Bank One.

In 1999, Citizens acquired F&M Bancorporation, with banks in Wisconsin and Iowa, for $820 million.

TCF Financial Corporation sold three locations to Citizens Banking on May 12, 2000. On April 25, 2005, F&M Bank-Wisconsin changed its name to Citizens Bank as Citizens Banking Corporation had applied to consolidate the two banks.

=== Citizens Republic Bancorp ===
On December 29, 2006, the bank acquired Republic Bancorp of Ann Arbor, Michigan to become, at the time, the 45th largest U.S. bank-holding company. After this acquisition, it was reestablished as Citizens Republic Bancorp. To gain Federal Reserve Bank approval for the merger with Republic Bank, Republic sold seven local branches to First Place Financial under its Franklin Bank subsidiary.

Due to many circumstances surrounding the beleaguered merger with Republic, Citizens began reporting consecutive quarterly losses over the next several years leading up to the 2008 recession. In December 2008, the bank received $300 million in funds from the Troubled Asset Relief Program after it suffered more losses from the downturn of the U.S. automotive industry during the 2008 financial crisis.

In 2010, the bank sold its F&M Bank Iowa locations for $50 million cash to Great Western Bank.

In 2011, the bank agreed to a settlement in a Redlining case as Republic Bank's successor by the US Department of Justice triggered by a Board of Governors of the Federal Reserve System complaint which will require them to open a loan office in a Detroit black neighborhood and $3.6 million for loans and grants in Wayne County.

In 2010, the bank reported losses of $286 million, its largest annual loss in three years of consecutive losses. It reported a net income of $17 million for 2011.

In 2011, the United States Department of the Treasury appointed two directors to the bank's board after it had failed to repay $300 million in bailout funds. For the first time since the economic downturn, the Bank reports in July 2012 five consecutive quarters of profit.

=== FirstMerit merger ===
In August 2012, Citizens Republic had not repaid its $300 million bailout loan from the US Treasury. The bank holding company considered issuing stock to pay the debt back, but instead put itself up for sale with J.P. Morgan Chase hired to find a buyer. On September 13, 2012, Akron, Ohio-based FirstMerit Corporation announced it would acquire Citizens in a stock-for-stock merger transaction valued at approximately $912 million. With the stock payment worth less than the stock's tangible book value, several law firms started looking into a possible case of breached fiduciary duties by Citizens Republic's Board of Directors. On April 12, 2013, First Merit Corporation closed on its acquisition of the company. FirstMerit repaid the $300 million in TARP funds, including $45 million of interest, on behalf of Citizens.

== Citizens Banking Building ==
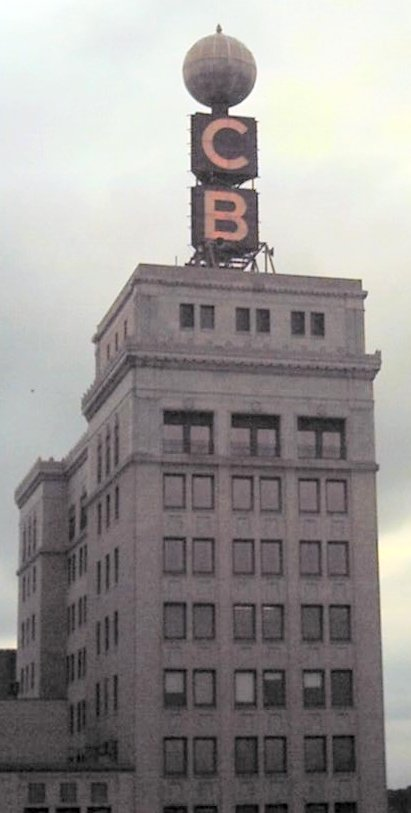
The southern tower of Citizens Banking Building in Flint, Michigan. The aging CB letters have since been replaced first with FM for FirstMerit, then with HB for Huntington Bank.

The Citizens Banking Building is currently the Flint headquarters for Huntington Bank. The building is more a complex of three structures, the North, South, and West building, which are interconnected. The ground and second floors connect the North and South buildings, while the South and West buildings are connected via the second and third floors over Buckham Alley.

In 1928, the South building was built with a lower level vault with a door weighing 43 tons which was then the largest vault door in the state. In the 1950s, a 4 four-story annex was added on its south side. West was built next in 1958 with four stories with 2 more added in 1965. The North Building was the final building build in 1974 as a 10-story building.

On June 13, 2013, the building was given a new FirstMerit Bank sign along with revealing the new design of the Weatherball. In October 2015, the University of Michigan–Flint announced a purchase agreement for $6 million the North tower of the building to be completed by March 31. The week of April 25 2018, the "FM" letters were removed for the current owners of the bank building, Huntington Bank, which purchase First Merit.

=== Weatherball on bank headquarters ===
The symbol of the bank was the weatherball atop its headquarters in downtown Flint. Currently it is lettered for Huntington Bancshares. The Weather Ball on the bank headquarters was first illuminated October 30, 1956. A poem explaining the weather meaning behind the ball's colors. In 1964, a Citizens Bank jingle was crafted by Jackie Bowles from the poem, with small alternation to the words, and set to Cumberland Mountain Bear Chase music. The ball is a regular beacon in the city except from 1974 until January 1, 1978, when it was turned off during the 1970s energy crisis. The weatherball was re-lettered for FirstMerit Bank in November 2013. The original "CB" letters were removed and were supposedly going to be put in the Sloan Museum in Flint, Michigan. Unfortunately, because of their poor condition due to their age, they had to be recycled. The "CB" initials underneath were made of neon piping for the letters with a metal, reflective backing behind the neon letters, and the letters were mounted on square porcelain plates.

The Weather Ball was operated by Citizens Republic Bancorp based on National Weather Service forecasts, and is still operated the same way. The Weather Ball’s construction materials include 800 square feet of Plexiglas and 667 feet of lighting tubing. It is designed to withstand winds of up to 120 mph.

- Weight: 2.5 tons
- Height: 15 feet
- Diameter: 15 feet
- Circumference: 47 feet.
