= Elwood Building =

Coordinates: 43.156025°N 77.612497°W

- Interactive map of the Elwood Building area

General information
- Location: Corner of State Street and Main Street (115 South Street), Rochester, New York, US
- Groundbreaking: May 13, 1879
- Opened: 1879
- Demolished: 1967

Technical details
- Floor count: 7

Design and construction
- Architect: James G. Cutler

The Elwood Building was built in 1879 for a Rochester lawyer Frank W. Elwood, whose family owned the property. The Elwood Building was the first building to have a mail chute, which was installed in 1884 by James Goold Cutler, the inventor of the mail chute.
