= Huntington Tower =

Office building in Akron, Ohio, United States

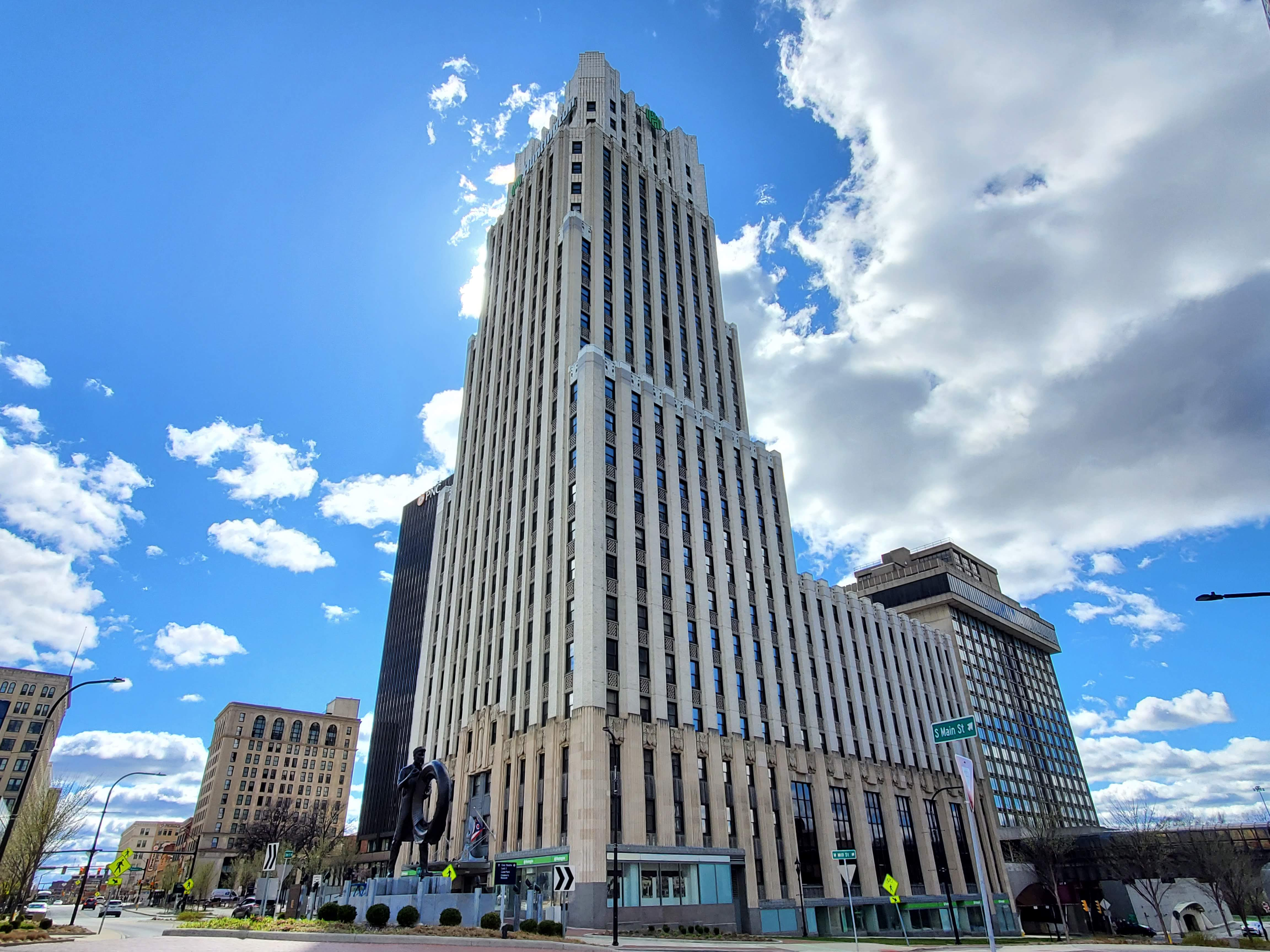

- Location within Ohio

General information
- Location: 106 S Main St, Akron, Ohio, U.S.
- Coordinates: 41.0823°N 81.5184°W
- Completed: 1931

Height
- Antenna spire: 137 metres (449 ft)
- Roof: 101 m (331 ft)

Technical details
- Floor count: 27

Design and construction
- Architect: Walker & Weeks
- First National Bank Building
- U.S. National Register of Historic Places
- Architect: Walker & Weeks
- Architectural style: Art Deco
- NRHP reference No.: 07000633
- Added to NRHP: June 27, 2007

Huntington Tower, earlier known as FirstMerit Tower, First National Bank Building, the First Central Tower and the First Central Trust Building, is a skyscraper in Akron, Ohio. The centerpiece of downtown Akron, it sits in the Cascade Plaza at the corner of S Main St and East Mill Street. The 330 ft (100 m) tower has been the city's tallest building since its completion in 1931.

The 27-story building is art deco in style and is covered in glazed architectural terra-cotta. Its lobby is built of Tennessee marble, white brick, and terra cotta, and features a large banking hall with arched windows.

The tower is also noted for its role in local broadcasting. Studios for WAKR radio were originally housed in the ground level from 1940 until 1953. The top of the building also held a television mast originally used by WAKR's TV adjacent, WAKR-TV (now WVPX-TV) and WAKR-FM. Erected in 1953 for WAKR-TV's sign-on and later donated to PBS member station WEAO, the antenna reached a height of 134.7 metres (442 ft) but was removed in 2019.

== History ==
The tower replaced the neo-Gothic Hamilton Building, completed on the site in 1900.

Around 2000, the tower was given a $2.5 million facelift, including a $1.8 million restoration of the tower's terra-cotta, brick, and limestone facade. The painstaking process involved the removal of some 450 blocks weighing up to 75 pounds (34 kg) for cleaning and reassembly. Over 1,100 other pieces of the masonry and tilework were repaired on site. In 2007, the tower underwent another restoration. Completed by Cleveland-based VIP Restorations, it included repointing of all masonry and terra-cotta joints, repairs to the windows, structural restoration, and a restoration of the 13th floor parapet. VIP Restorations also helped to get the building placed on the National Register of Historic Places.

The building's name changed after Huntington acquired FirstMerit in 2016.

In 2019, Huntington announced the building was for sale.
