= CitiCenter Building =

- U.S. National Register of Historic Places
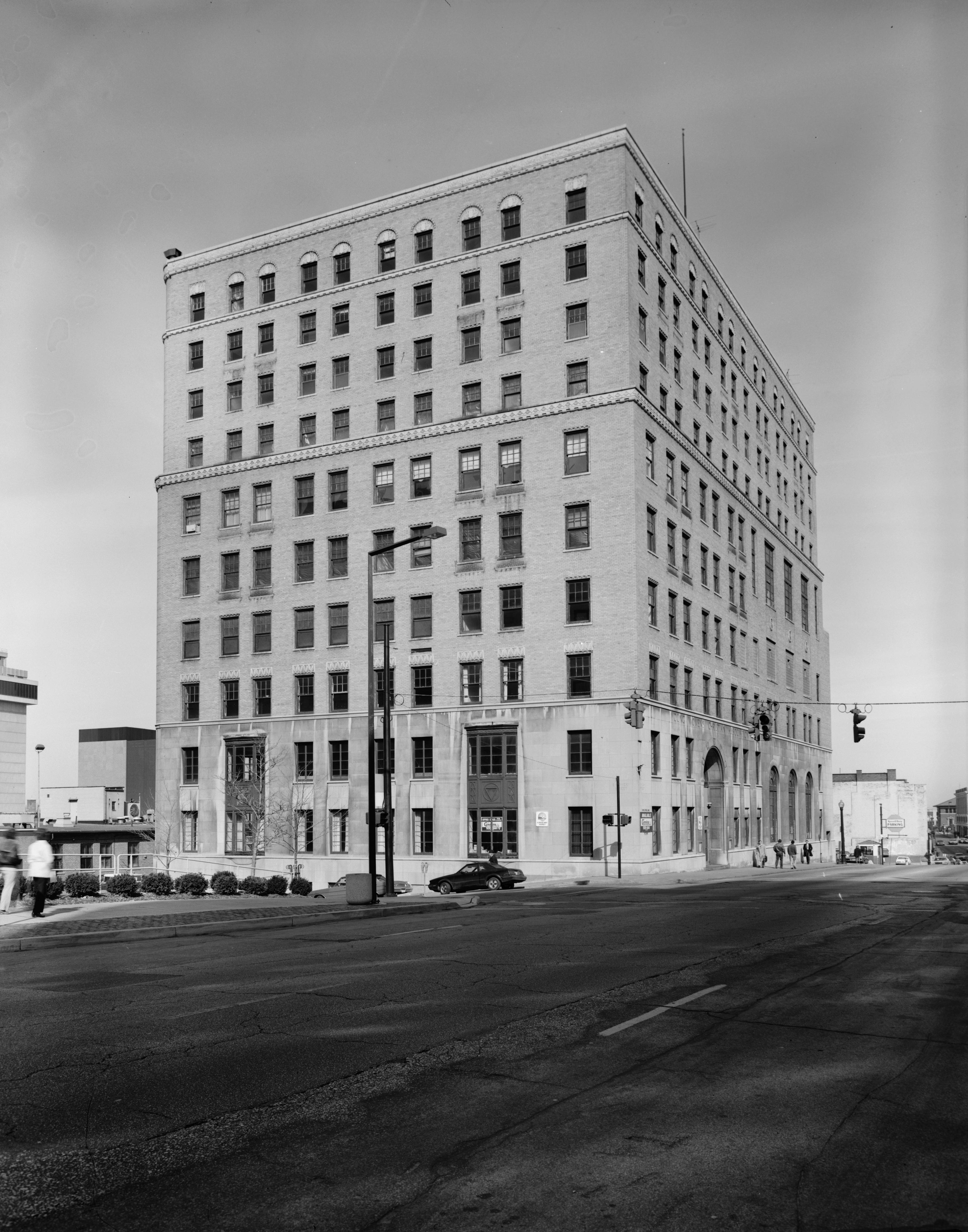
- The building in 1984
- Interactive map of CitiCenter Building
- Location: 146 S. High St., Akron, Ohio
- Coordinates: 41.0811°N 81.5175°W
- Built: 1931
- Architectural style: Art Deco
- NRHP reference No.: 82001491
- Added to NRHP: November 4, 1982

The CitiCenter Building is a historic high-rise building in Akron, Ohio. The eleven-story structure is the eleventh-tallest in the city, and was listed on the National Register of Historic Places in 1982.

The building was constructed in 1931 as a Young Women's Christian Association branch. The building was purchased by a developer in 1985. It then held the CitiCenter Athletic Club, which closed in 2018. The building also held multiple city departments, until vacating around 2018.

In 2018, a Cleveland-based developer purchased the building. The company then proposed it for redevelopment at a cost of $28 million, to create 95 apartments and three floors of office space. The building project won a $3 million state tax credit in 2020, allowing the project to begin. It was sold to Welty Development Group in 2025.

== See also ==
- National Register of Historic Places listings in Akron, Ohio
