= Law Building =

Coordinates: 41°04′51.4″N 81°31′07.7″W

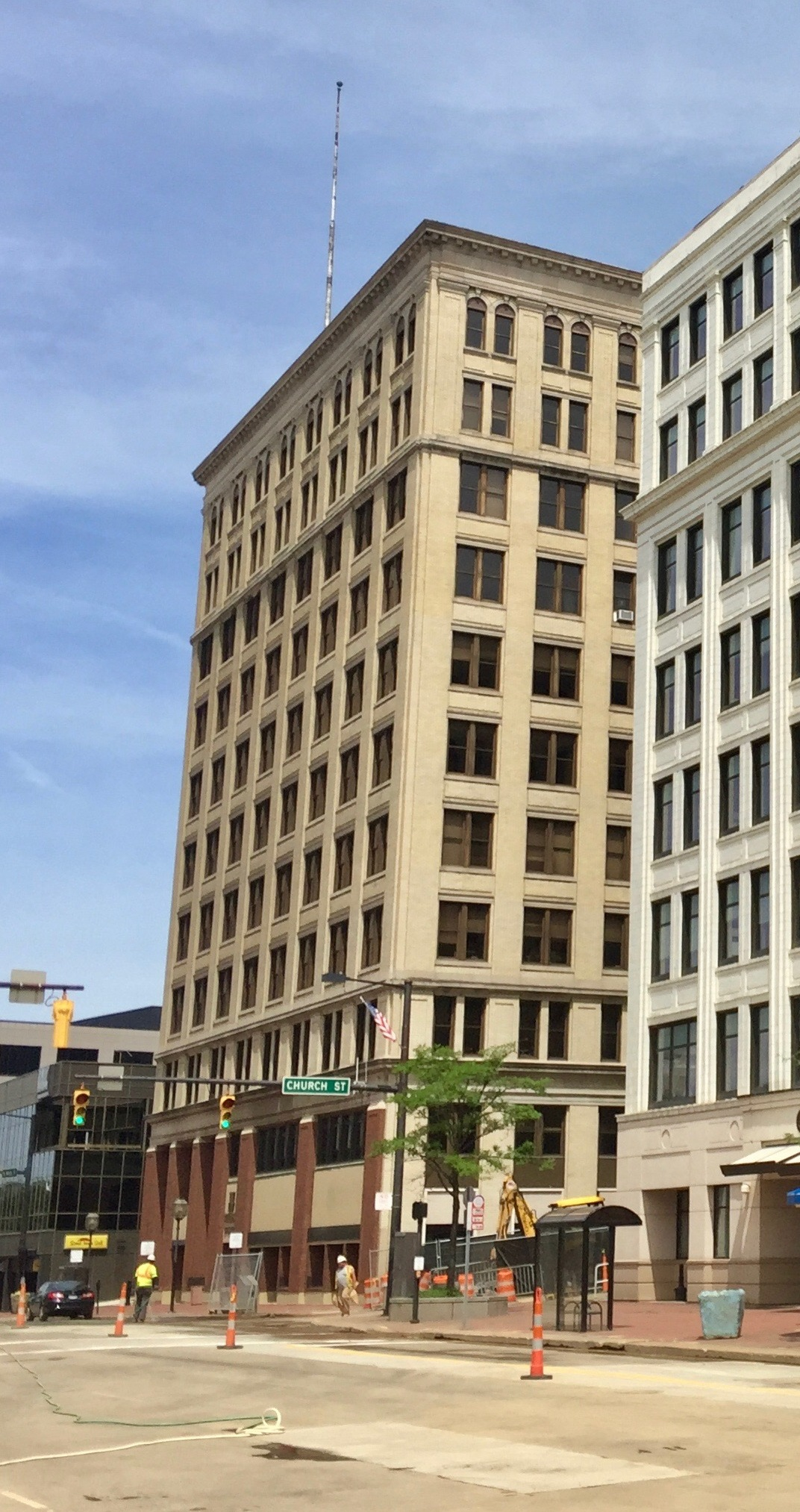
- Interactive map of the Law Building area

General information
- Type: Office
- Architectural style: Neo-classicism
- Location: Akron, Ohio
- Construction started: 1910
- Completed: 1911
- Renovated: 1920

Height
- Architectural: 150 feet
- Roof: 136 feet

Technical details
- Floor count: 12

The Law Building (formerly known as the Second National Bank Building and the Key Building) is a mixed use high-rise building located at 159 South Main Street in the city of Akron, Ohio. Construction of the building began in 1910 and was completed in 1911. The building stands at a height of 150 feet, making it one of the tallest buildings in the city. The elaborate brickwork and delicate ornamentation of its facade and rigid-frame structural system are prime examples of characteristics that define neoclassical architecture.

== History ==
KeyBank moved out of the building in 2011 and opened a new branch and regional headquarters a block away. White Hat Management, one of the state's largest for-profit managers of charter schools, also vacated the building in 2011. After that, 40% of the building was left unoccupied. The building was redeveloped into a mixed use building with offices and luxury residences. The ground floor was converted to event space.

== See also ==
- List of tallest buildings in Akron, Ohio
