= PNC Building =

Coordinates: 41°4′54″N 81°31′10″W

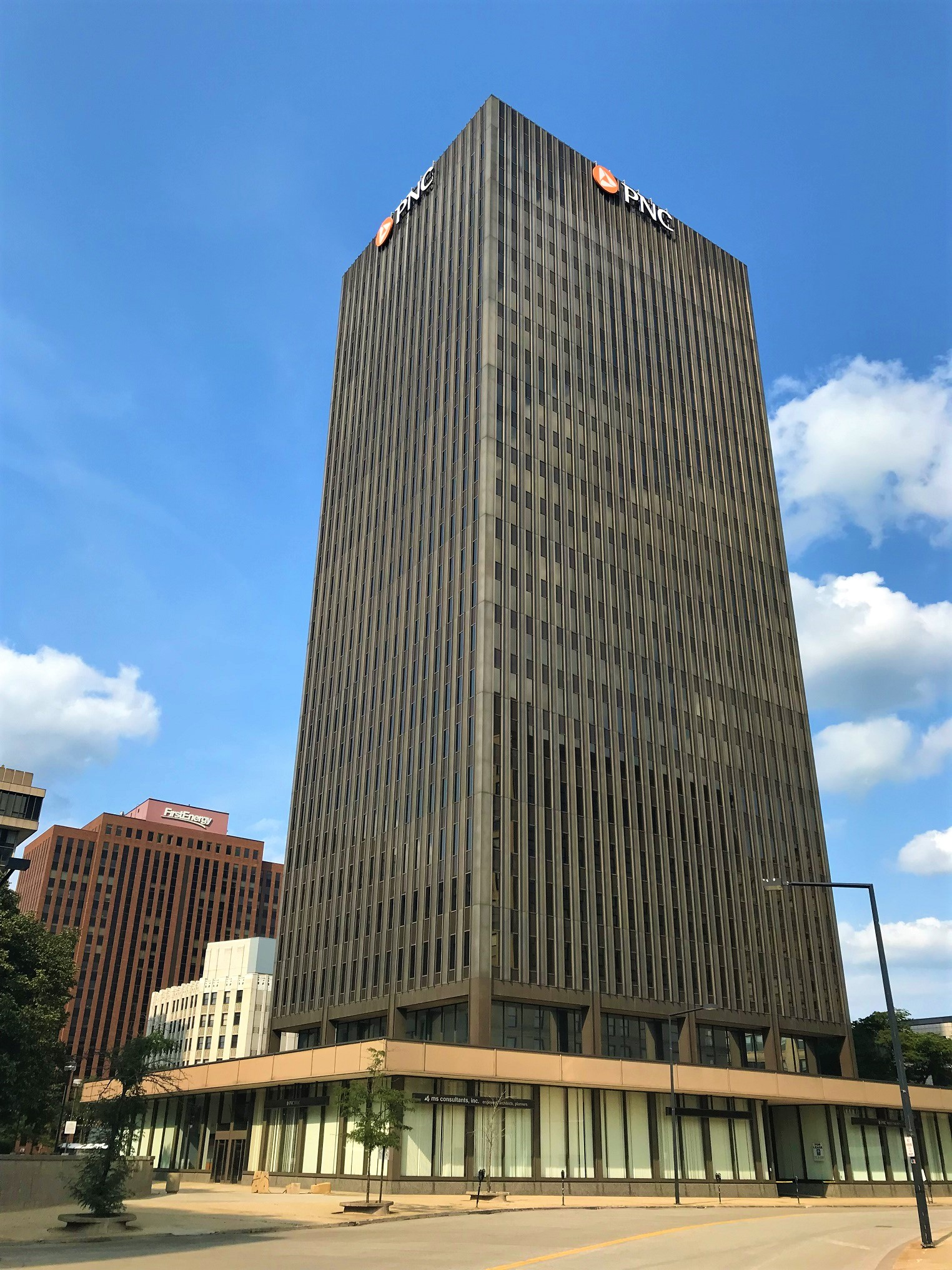
- The PNC Building
- Interactive map of the PNC Building area

General information
- Location: 1 Cascade Plaza, Akron, OH 44308
- Completed: 1968
- Renovated: 2018

Height
- Height: 316 ft (96 m)

Technical details
- Size: 237,450 sq ft (22,060 m^{2})
- Floor count: 23
- Floor area: 10,324 sq ft (959.1 m^{2})

The PNC Building, officially One Cascade Plaza, is a 23-story high-rise structure in Downtown Akron, Ohio. The building is the second-tallest in Akron. It was owned by the National City Bank until 2008, when the Pittsburgh-based PNC Bank purchased the company. In 2016, after years of the bank only having street-level signage outside the structure, PNC opted to install skyline signage on all four sides of the structure.

The building was completed in 1968. In 2018, much of the building's machinery was removed and replaced amid an $8.5 million (equivalent to $10.9 million in 2025) renovation for energy efficiency upgrades.
