= Mayflower Manor Apartments =

High-rise residential building in Akron, Ohio

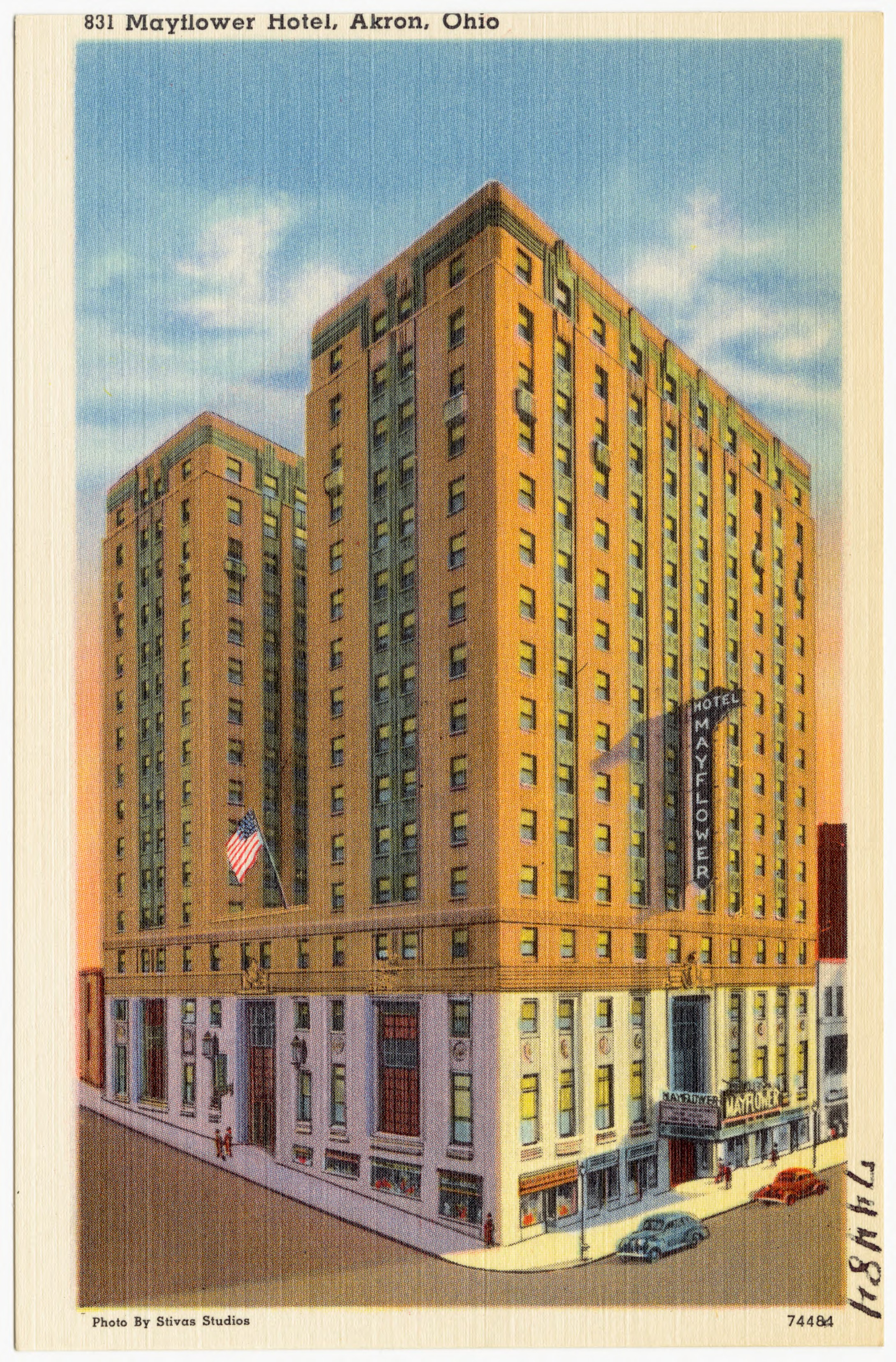
- Interactive map of the Mayflower Manor Apartments area

General information
- Status: Completed
- Type: Residential
- Architectural style: Art Deco
- Location: 263 South Main Street, Akron, Ohio, United States
- Coordinates: 41.078373°N 81.520357°W
- Completed: 1931
- Cost: $1,937,760

Design and construction
- Architect: Graham, Anderson, Probst & White

Mayflower Manor Apartments is a high-rise residential building located at 263 South Main Street in Downtown Akron, Ohio, United States. It has 16 floors (as well as one sub-level) and stands at a height of 207 feet, making it one of the tallest buildings in the city.

== History ==
Construction of the Mayflower Hotel began in 1930 and the hotel opened on May 18, 1931. Bill Wilson made a call that connected with Henrietta Seiberling, which eventually led him to the introduction to Dr. Bob Smith and the creation of Alcoholics Anonymous. This phone can still be found in the hotel lobby.

It was designed by the prolific architecture firm Graham, Anderson, Probst & White, and has many trademark features of the Art Deco style of its day. Sheraton Hotels purchased the Mayflower in 1955 and renamed it first the Sheraton-Mayflower and then later the Sheraton Hotel. Sheraton sold the hotel, along with seventeen other aging properties, to Gotham Hotels in 1968 and it regained its original name. The hotel closed in 1971. It was reopened in the 1980s as apartments for senior citizens, serving low-income residents and people with disabilities.
