= Woodforest National Bank =

Bank headquartered in The Woodlands, Texas

- Type: Private
- Industry: Financial services
- Founded: 1980
- Headquarters: The Woodlands, Texas, USA
- Key people: Julie Mayrant (Chief Executive Officer)
- Products: Banking
- Net income: 203.1 million (2024)
- Total assets: $9 billion (2024)
- Total equity: $349.5 million (2024)
- Number of employees: 4,598
- Parent: Woodforest Financial Group
- Website: woodforest.com

Woodforest National Bank is a privately held bank headquartered in The Woodlands, Texas. As of March 2020, it had more than 770 branches in 17 different states. Woodforest National Bank is Walmart's largest retail partner, and also provides financial services for Sam's Club members. The bank also has a branch inside the main location of Houston's Gallery Furniture.

In addition to regular accounts, Woodforest National Bank offers "second chance" checking accounts for customers who have not remained in good standing with the check verification service ChexSystems, albeit with higher fees and a much longer probation period compared to traditional banks, along with the same type of account for commercial customers.

== Banking offices ==
In March 2013, Woodforest National Bank and Western Union reached a deal for the latter to provide wire transfer services from Woodforest locations.

Number of banking offices by State
| State | Banking offices |
|---|---|
| Alabama | 42 |
| Florida | 6 |
| Georgia | 9 |
| Illinois | 53 |
| Indiana | 49 |
| Kentucky | 28 |
| Louisiana | 18 |
| Maryland | 11 |
| Mississippi | 26 |
| New York | 24 |
| North Carolina | 89 |
| Ohio | 77 |
| Pennsylvania | 50 |
| South Carolina | 32 |
| Texas | 204 |
| Virginia | 56 |
| West Virginia | 9 |

== Sponsorship ==
A five-acre facility located in the Woodlands Trade Center was created partly thanks to a $1 million donation from Woodforest National Bank. As of April 2013 it is being renamed "Woodforest Food Bank Center for Montgomery County Food Bank". The food center is campaigning to raise $6.5 million to purchase and renovate a 60,000 square feet (5,600 m^{2}) facility. Contributions were also made by Anadarko Petroleum, Kroger, Walmart, and H-E-B. The Woodforest National Bank is sponsoring its annual 5K Tomball Dash, benefiting the Woodforest Charitable Foundation.

Conroe Independent School District sold naming rights for a 10,000 seat stadium in Shenandoah, Texas, for $1 million to Woodforest National Bank.

== Fee disputes ==
Woodforest National Bank and the Office of the Comptroller of the Currency reached a $32 million settlement regarding the bank's continuous overdraft fees, and a 2014 class action settlement put an end to debit card transaction processing in the same order as check processing, potentially resulting in additional overdraft fees.
