= FirstMerit Corporation =

Bank

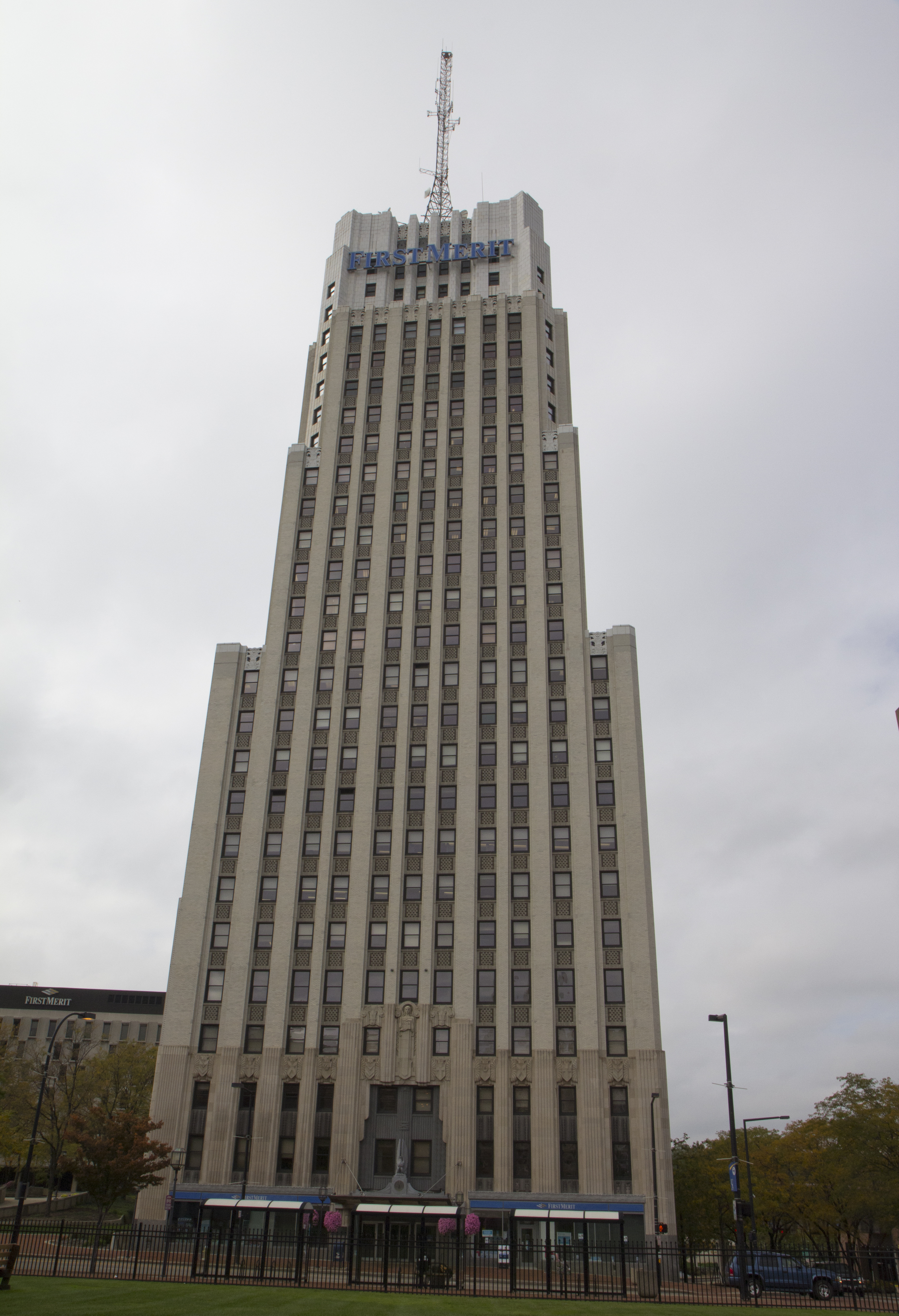
- FirstMerit's headquarters in Akron, Ohio
- Company type: Public
- Traded as: Nasdaq: FMER
- Industry: Banking; Financial services; Investment
- Founded: 1845; 181 years ago
- Defunct: 2017
- Fate: Acquired by Huntington Bancshares in August 2016
- Successor: Huntington Bancshares
- Headquarters: 106 King James Way, Akron, Ohio, United States
- Number of locations: 366
- Area served: Ohio; Western Pennsylvania; Northern Illinois; Michigan; Wisconsin
- Key people: Paul G. Greig (chairman & CEO)
- Products: Retail Banking; Commercial bank; Private Banking; Mortgage loan; Credit Card
- Revenue: ▲US$1.1 billion (FY 2014)
- Net income: ▲US$237 million (FY 2014)
- Total assets: ▲US$24.9 billion (FY 2014)
- Total equity: ▲US$2.8 billion (FY 2014)
- Number of employees: 4,619 (FTE)
- Website: firstmerit.com at the Wayback Machine (archived February 8, 2014)

FirstMerit Corporation was a diversified financial services company headquartered in Akron, Ohio, with assets of approximately $26.2 billion as of June 30, 2016, and 359 banking offices and 400 ATM locations in Ohio, Michigan, Wisconsin, Illinois and Pennsylvania. FirstMerit provided a range of banking and other financial services to consumers and businesses. Principal affiliates included: FirstMerit Bank, N.A., and FirstMerit Mortgage Corporation. It was acquired by Huntington Bancshares in August 2016.

== History ==
FirstMerit predecessors go back as far as 1845. In 1981, First National Bank of Ohio and Old Phoenix National Bank of Medina merged into First Bancorporation of Ohio (First Ohio). The next year, First Ohio purchased Twinsburg Banking Company. In 1985, Exchange Bank in Canal Fulton in Stark County, Ohio was acquired by First Ohio. The Bank continued expansion in Ohio buying bank branches in many Ohio counties for the following nine years.

Following the 1995 purchase of CIVISTA Corporation in Canton, Ohio, parent of Citizens Savings, the holding company name changed from First Bancorporation to FirstMerit Corporation. FirstMerit added to its portfolio in 1997 Abell & Associates, a life insurance and financial consulting firm. Expansion of the corporation continued in Ohio and Lawrence County, Pennsylvania with the purchase of 32 more branches.

FirstMerit made two deals in 2009 with St. Louis-based First Bank and its affiliate for 24 Chicago-area branches with $1.2 billion in deposits and for the affiliates' asset-based loans. In 2010, the acquired First Banks are either closed or converted into FirstMerit branches. Expansion into Chicago continued that year with the acquisition of George Washington Savings Bank and Midwest Bank and Trust, both failed banks.

On September 13, 2012, it was announced that FirstMerit would acquire Citizens Republic Bancorp in a stock-for-stock transaction valued at approximately $912 million. The acquisition closed in the second quarter of 2013. With the stock payment worth less than the stock's tangible book value, several law firms started looking into a possible case of breached fiduciary duties by Citizens Republic Board of Directors.

Sandy Pierce was appointed in January 2013 as FirstMerit's vice chair and chairman and CEO of FirstMerit Michigan. In early April, both Bank Corporations' shareholders approved the merger. On April 12, 2013, FirstMerit Corporation closed the acquisition of company which will operate as of April 13 as "Citizens Bank, now part of FirstMerit Bank." The banks owned by Citizens Republic Bancorp were officially renamed FirstMerit Bank on June 13, 2013. In November 2013, the landmark Citizens Bank weather ball on top of the former Citizens Republic Bancorp headquarters in Flint, Michigan was refaced with the letters C B replaced with F M.

=== Huntington acquisition ===
On January 26, 2016, Huntington Bank announced it would purchase FirstMerit, subject to regulatory approval, in a deal that would make Huntington the largest bank in Ohio. Huntington completed the acquisition of FirstMerit on August 16. Due to anti-trust concerns by the Justice Department, 11 branches in Canton and two in Ashtabula were sold to First Commonwealth Bank. Additionally 107 branches located within 2.5 miles of other Huntington / FirstMerit branches were closed. All remaining FirstMerit branches and accounts were converted to Huntington in early 2017.

In 2017, Huntington became responsible for the costs of a $15.9 million class-action lawsuit filed in 2011 that alleged FirstMerit unfairly charged some customers overdraft fees.

== Headquarters ==
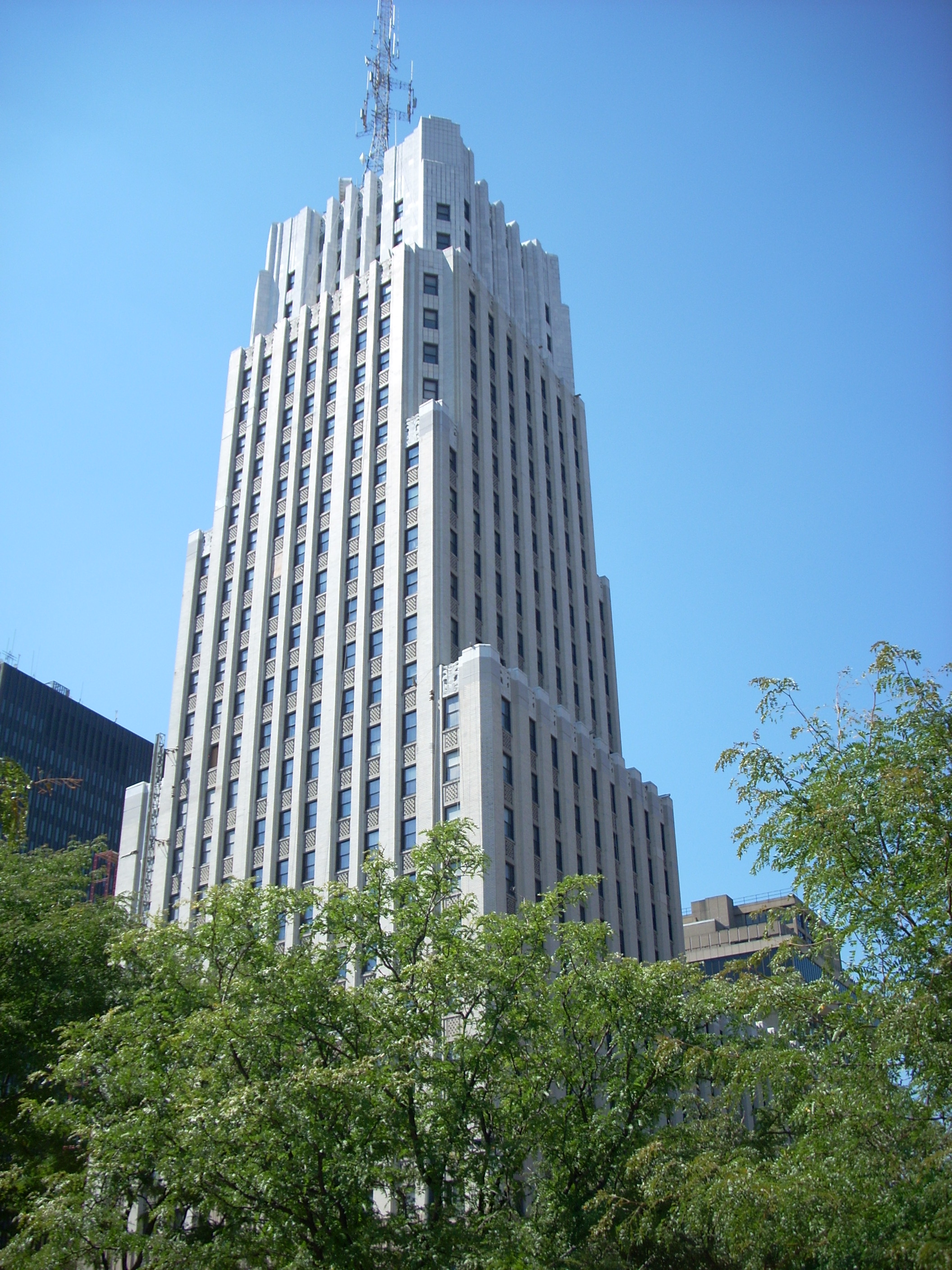
The FirstMerit Tower from the ground in Akron, Ohio.

FirstMerit, founded in 1845, was headquartered in Akron, Ohio at the FirstMerit Tower. The building, built in 1931, is the tallest in Akron with 27 floors.

== Subsidiaries ==
- FirstMerit Bank, N.A.
- FirstMerit Mortgage Corporation
- FirstMerit Community Development Corporation
