= Great Lakes region =

Region of the United States and Canada

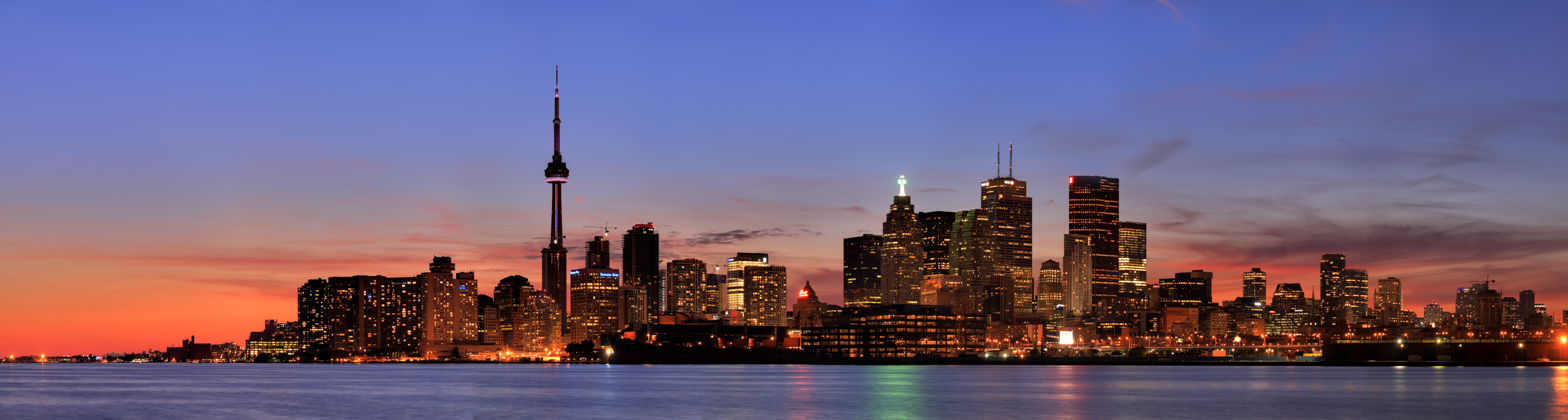
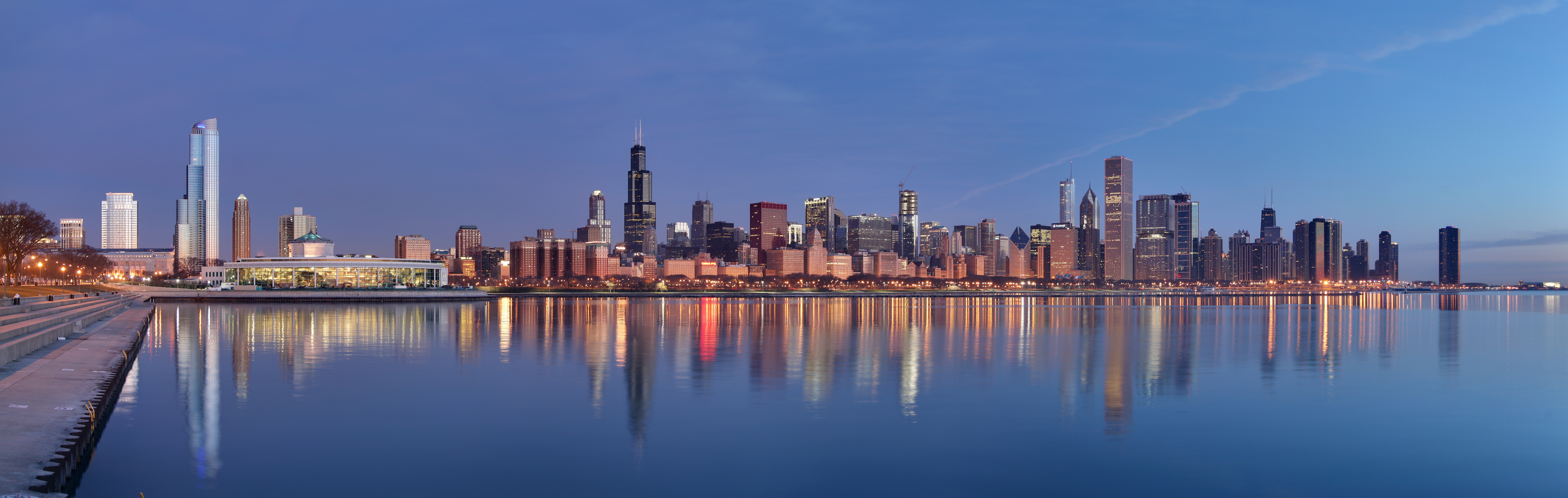
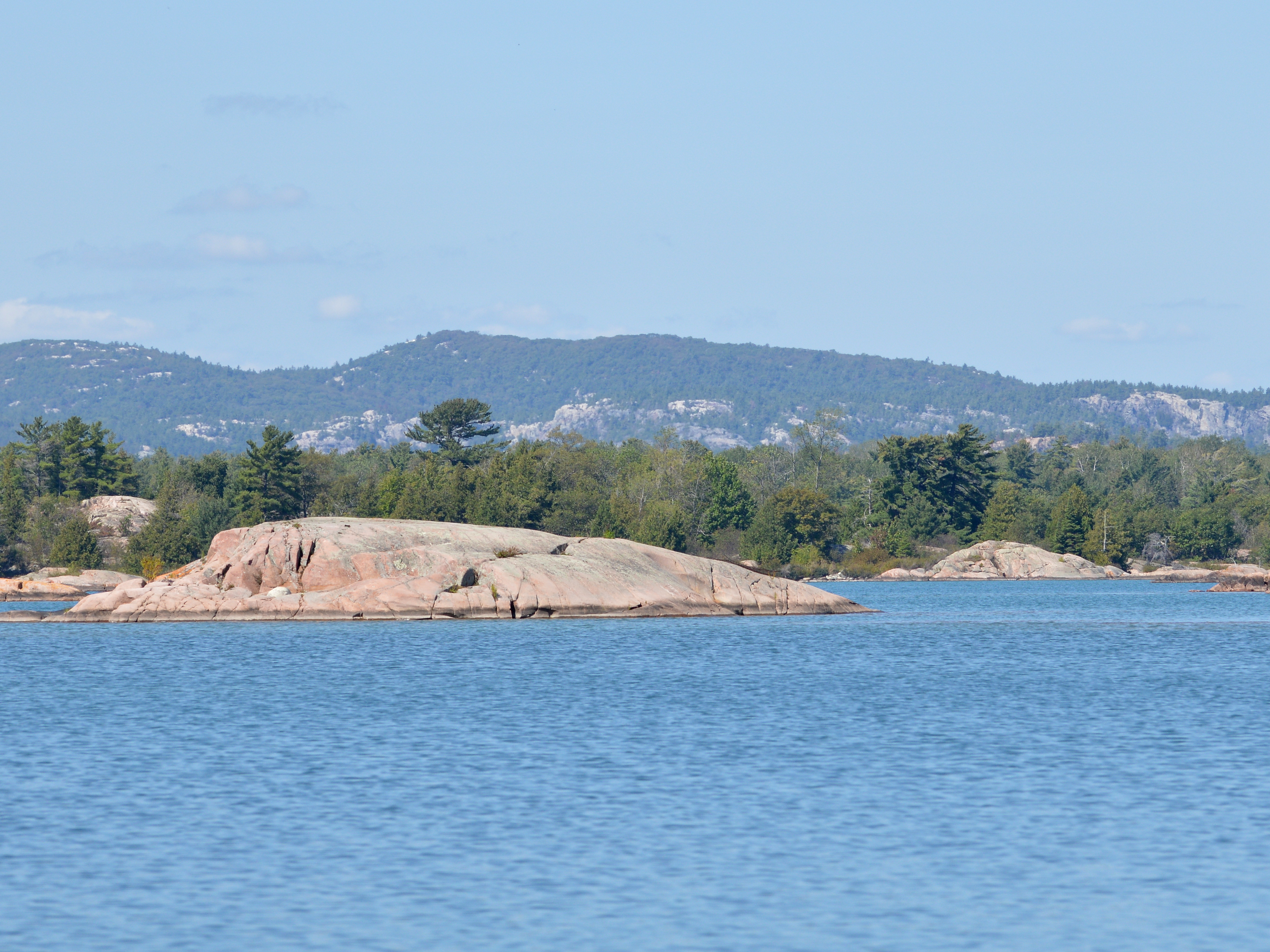
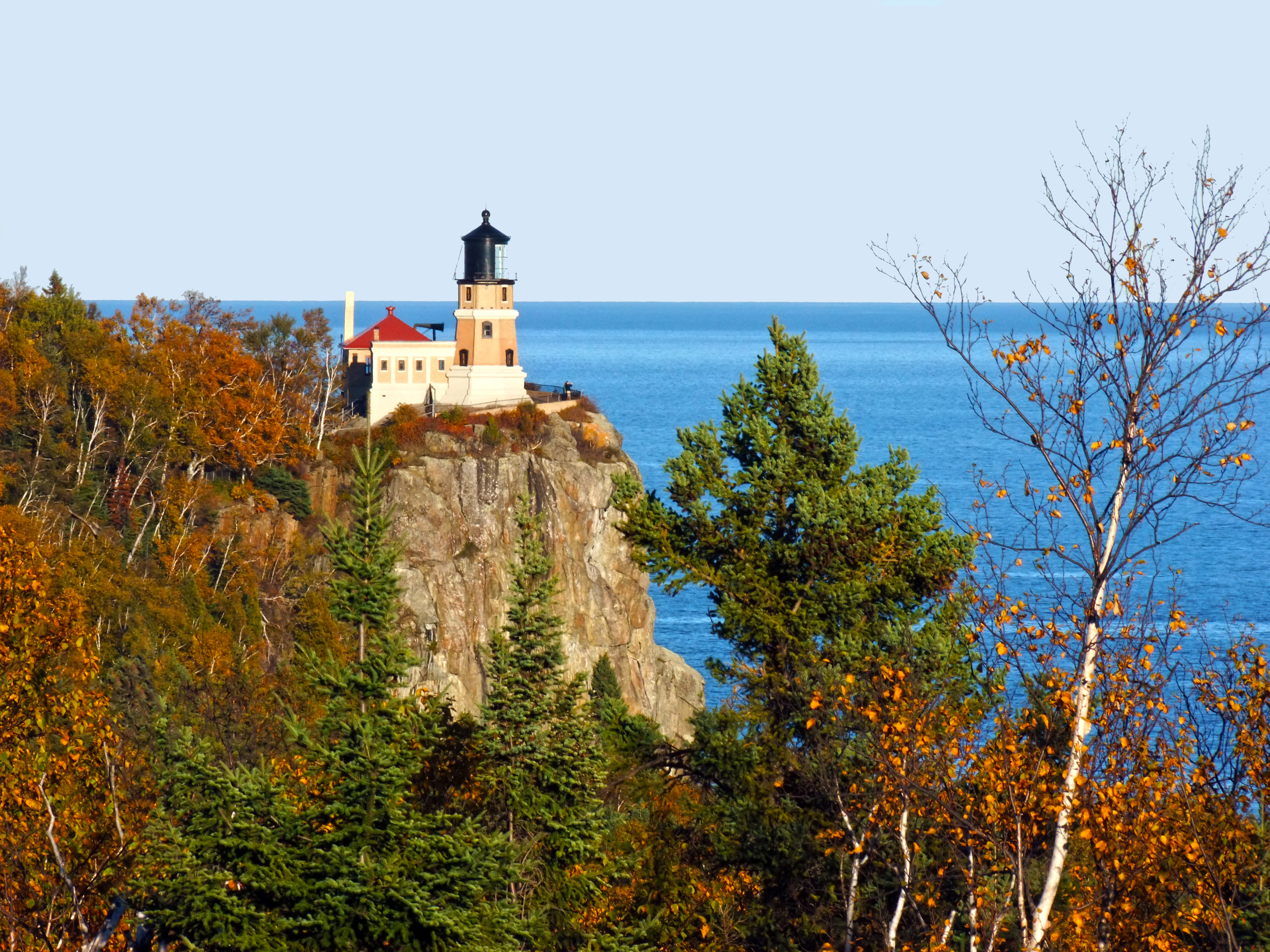
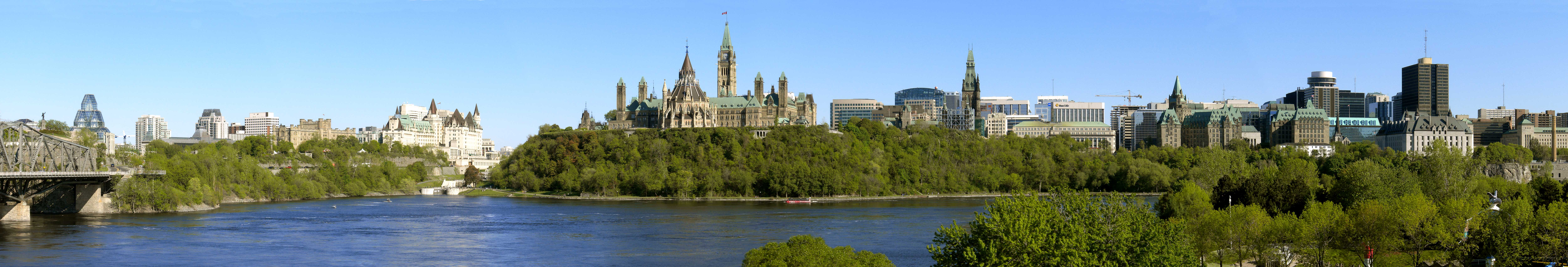
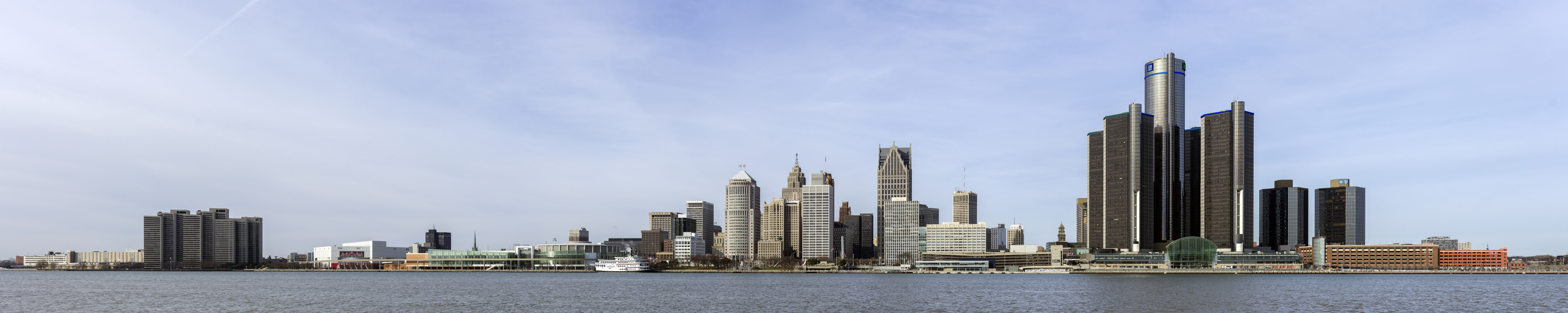
- Left to right from top: Toronto, Chicago, La Cloche Mountains, Split Rock Lighthouse, Ottawa, Detroit

- The eight U.S. states and one Canadian province shown in red all have shorelines on at least one of the Great Lakes.
- Largest metropolitan areas: Chicagoland; Greater Toronto Area (GTA); Metro Detroit; Twin Cities; Greater Cleveland; Metro Milwaukee
- States and provinces: Illinois; Indiana; Michigan; Minnesota; New York; Ohio; Ontario; Pennsylvania; Wisconsin

Population
  - Total: 85,011,531 (U.S.) 14,755,211 (Canada) 99,766,742 (Total)
- Demonym: Great Laker

The Great Lakes region of Northern America is a binational Canadian–American region centered on the Great Lakes that includes the U.S. states of Illinois, Indiana, Michigan, Minnesota, New York, Ohio, Pennsylvania, and Wisconsin and the Canadian province of Ontario. It encompasses both the Upper Midwest and parts of the Mid-Atlantic. Canada's Quebec province is at times included as part of the region because the St. Lawrence River watershed is part of the continuous hydrologic system. The region forms a distinctive historical, economic, and cultural identity. A portion of the region also encompasses the Great Lakes megalopolis.

State and provincial governments are represented in the Conference of Great Lakes and St. Lawrence Governors and Premiers, which also serves as the Secretariat to the Great Lakes St. Lawrence Compact and the Great Lakes–Saint Lawrence River Basin Sustainable Water Resources Agreement.

The Great Lakes region takes its name from the corresponding geological formation of the Great Lakes Basin, a narrow watershed encompassing the Great Lakes, bounded by watersheds to the region's north by the Hudson Bay, to the west by the Mississippi, and to the east and south by the Ohio. To the east, the rivers of St. Lawrence, Richelieu, Hudson, Mohawk and Susquehanna form an arc of watersheds east to the Atlantic.

The Great Lakes region, as distinct from the Great Lakes Basin, defines a unit of sub-national political entities defined by the U.S. states and the Canadian province of Ontario encompassing the Great Lakes watershed, and the states and province bordering one or more of the Great Lakes.

Since time immemorial Indigenous peoples have lived in the Great Lakes region. Historically, native tribes in the region have engaged in political alliances with other indigenous groups and maintained cultural kinship and harvesting relationships. For instance, Potawatomi peoples have organized culturally and politically through the ‘seasonal round’ system to adapt to environmental change. During the period of early European exploration and colonization in the region, policies aimed at western expansion encroached upon Native land, intending to remove Native Americans from their land and the U.S. political landscape. European settlement also affected Native American relationships with local ecosystems through removal from lands, industrialization, and environmental degradation, causing disconnection from cultural practices. Despite this, indigenous groups including the Anishinaabe and Potawatomi exercise self-determination through maintaining reciprocal relationships with the land and conservation projects including that of Lake Sturgeon.

The Great Lakes make up the world's largest freshwater system, supporting millions of people but have been historically impacted by pollutants from agricultural runoff, sewage disposal, and contamination from local industries leading to long-term environmental impacts and health implications for residents, as well as large-scale governmental policy responses. The region has seen several water quality crises including in 2014 in Toledo and Flint. These cases underscore the unequal impact of environmental harm on vulnerable minority communities in the region.

== Geography ==
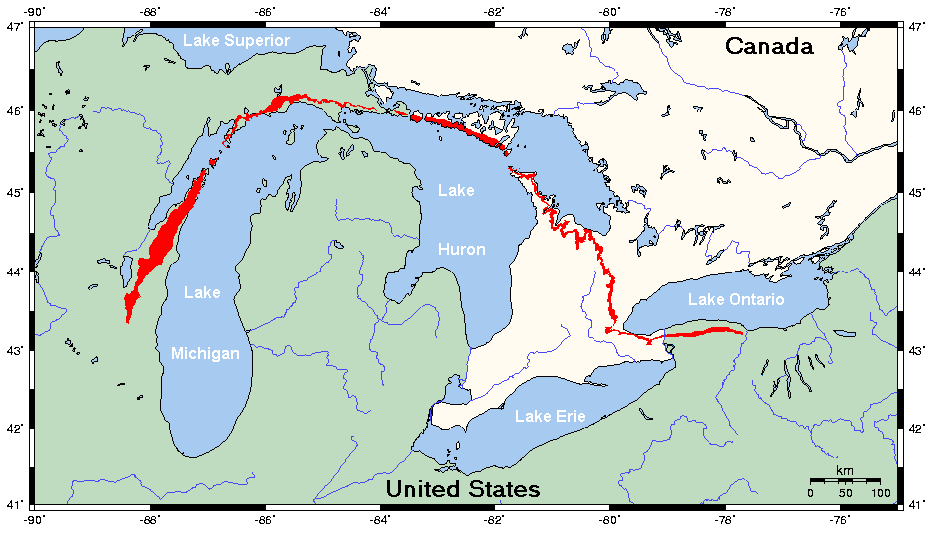
Niagara Escarpment (in red)

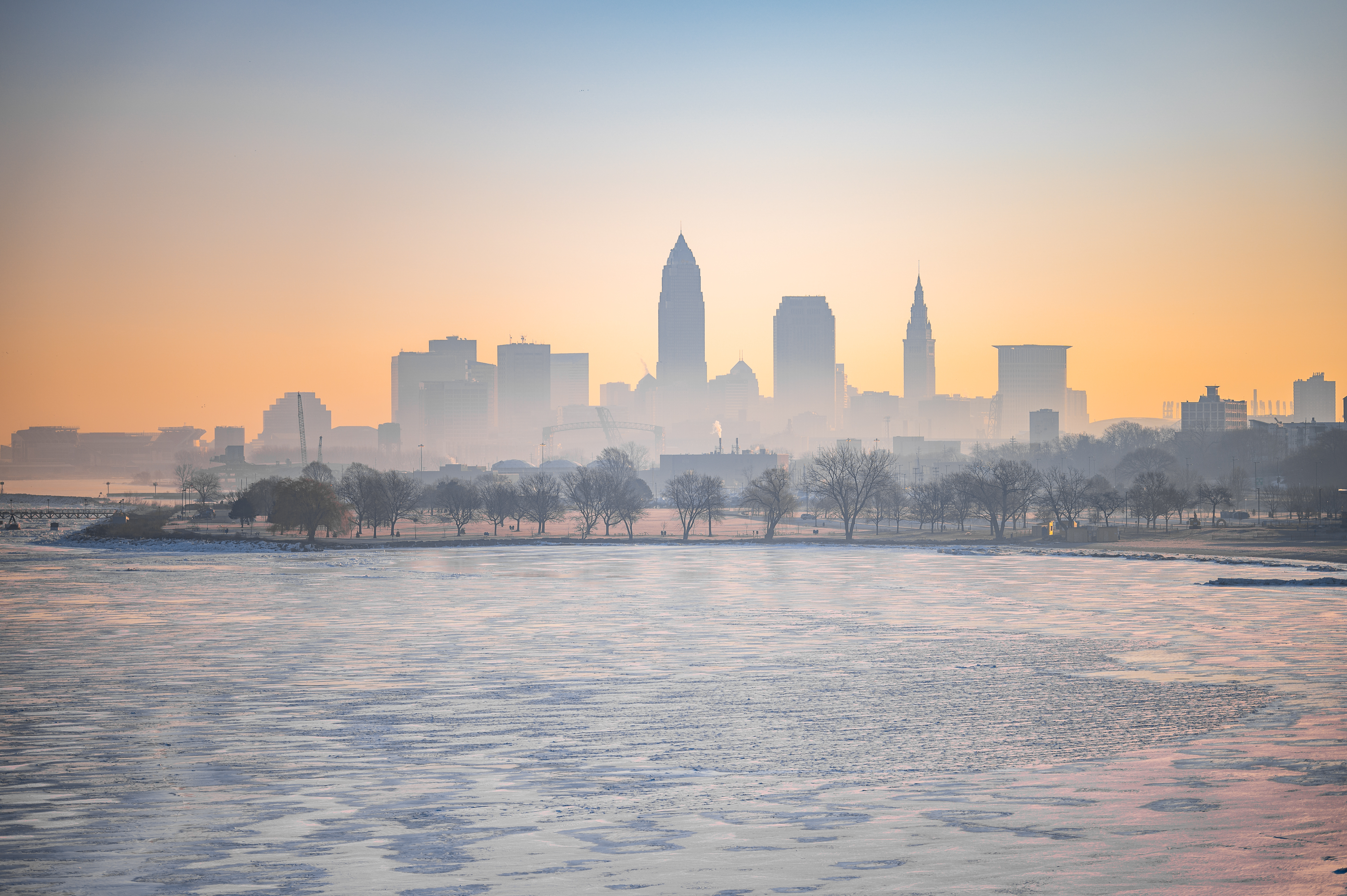
Cleveland and Lake Erie in winter

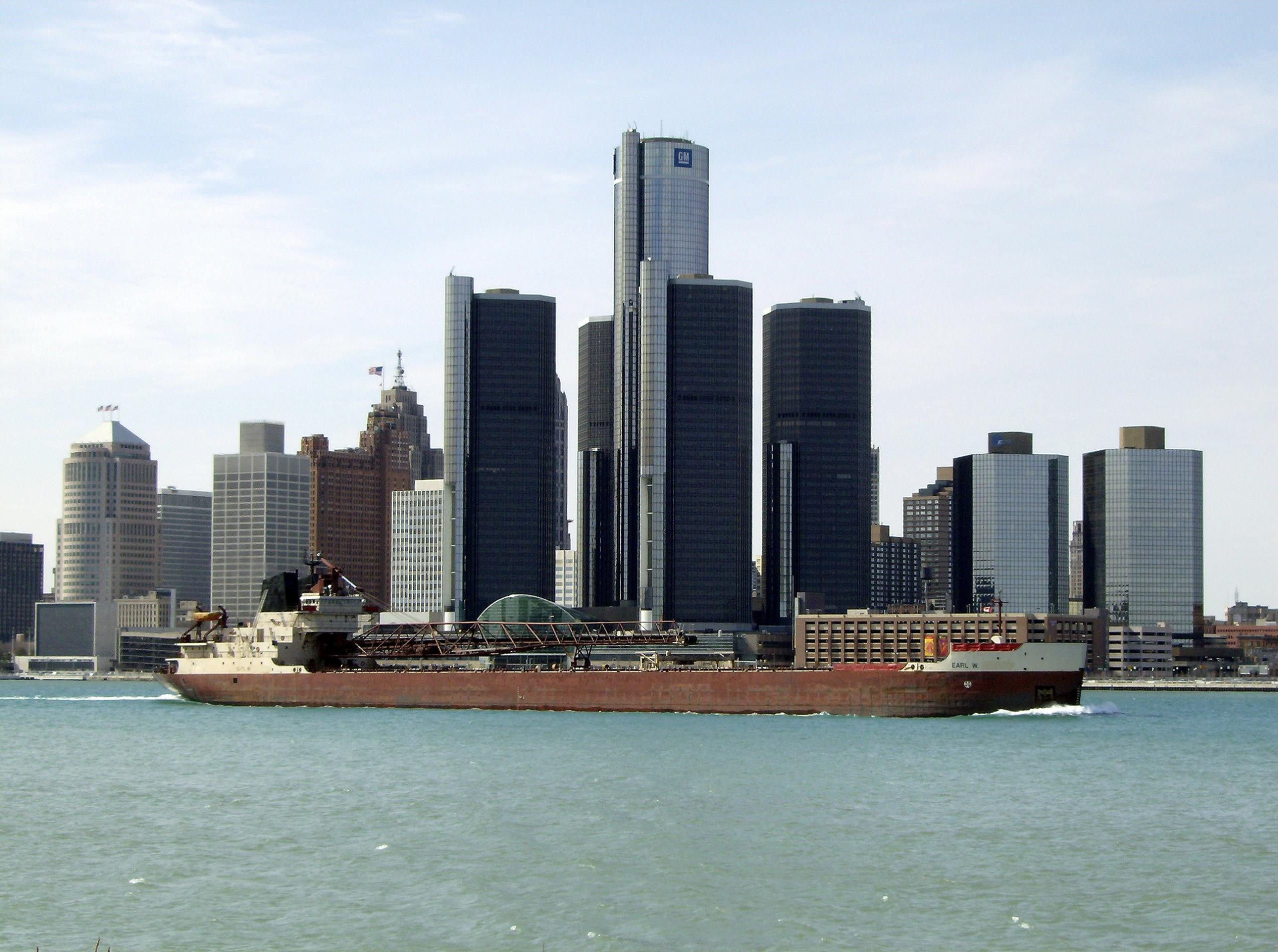
An upbound lake freighter passing the Detroit riverfront including the Renaissance Center

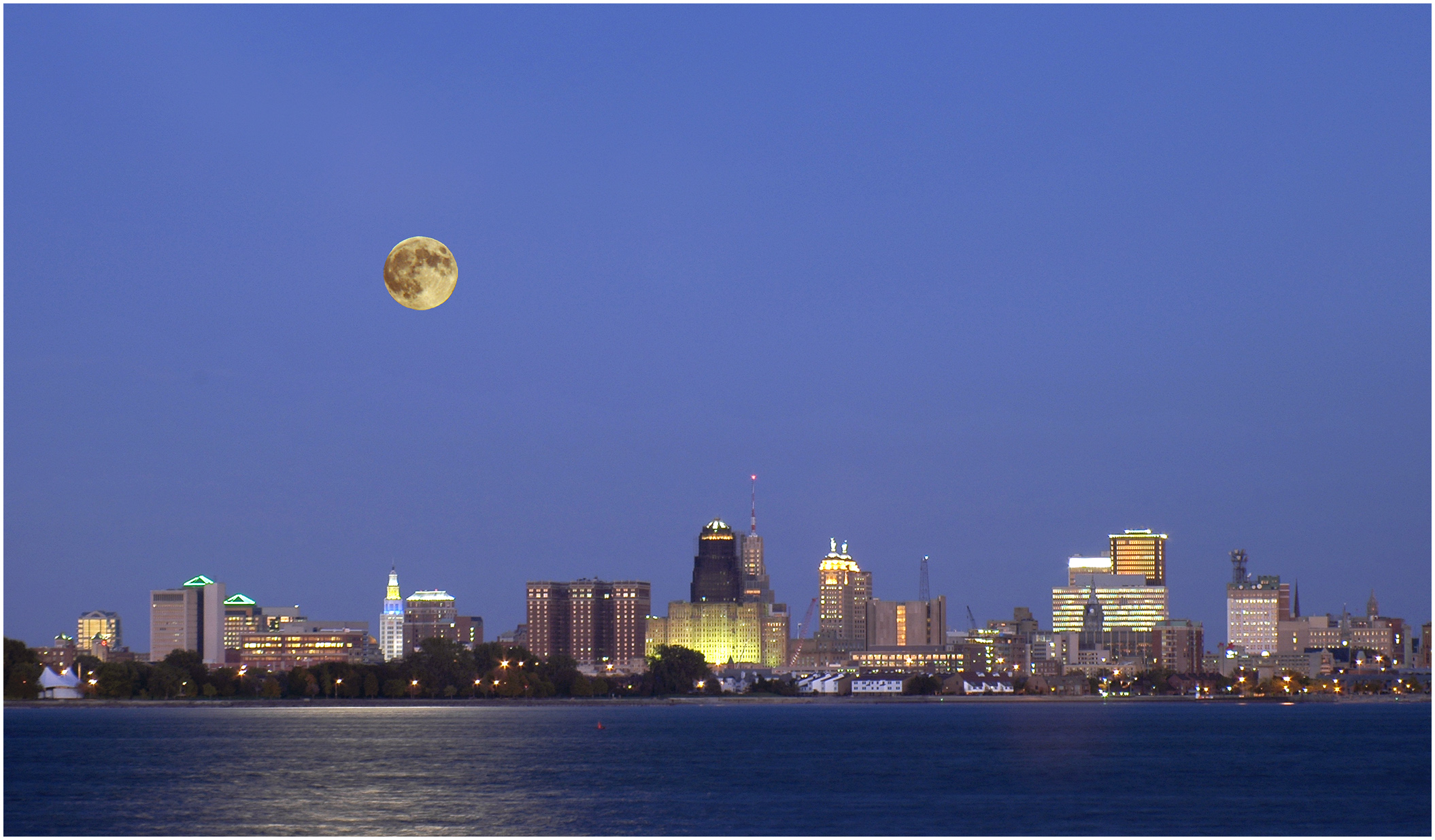
Buffalo near the Niagara River

The Palaeozoic strata are parts of a great area of similar layers hundreds of feet in thickness. These strata decline gently southward from the great upland of the Laurentian Highlands of eastern Canada. The visible upland area of today was a small part of the primeval continent with the remainder of it still buried under a Palaeozoic cover. The visible part was the last part of the primeval continent to sink under the advancing Palaeozoic seas. This district may be considered an ancient coastal plain. The weaker layers are worn down in sub-parallel belts of lower land between the upland and the belts of more resistant strata, which rise in uplands. Illustrations of this type of forms are found in the district of the Great Lakes. The chief upland belt or escarpment is formed by the firm Niagara limestone/dolomite, which takes its name from the gorge and falls cut through the upland by the Niagara River. The Niagara Escarpment has a relatively strong slope or effacing escarpment on the side towards the upland, and a long gentle slope on the other side. Its relief is seldom more than 200 or 300 feet (91 m) and is generally small. Its continuity and its contrast with the associated lowlands on the underlying and overlying weak strata make it an important feature. The escarpment would lie straight east–west if the slant of the strata were uniformly to the south. However, the strata are somewhat warped and so the escarpment's course is strongly convex to the north in the middle, gently convex to the south at either end.

The escarpment begins where its determining limestone/dolomite begins, in west-central New York. There, it separates the lowlands that separate Lake Ontario from Lake Erie. It curves to the northwest through the Ontario province to the island belt that divides the Georgian Bay from Lake Huron. From there, it heads westward through the land-arm between Lake Superior and Lake Michigan and southwestward into the narrow points dividing Green Bay from Lake Michigan. Finally, it fades away with the thinning out of the limestone and is hardly traceable across the Mississippi River. The arrangement of the Great Lakes closely matches the course of the lowlands worn on the two belts of weaker strata on either side of the Niagara escarpment. Lake Ontario, Georgian Bay and Green Bay occupy depressions in the lowland on the inner side of the escarpment. Lake Erie, Lake Huron and Lake Michigan lie in depressions in the lowland on the outer side. When the two lowlands are traced eastward, they become confluent after the Niagara limestone has faded away in central New York, and the single lowland is continued under the name of the Mohawk Valley. This is an east–west longitudinal depression that has been eroded on a belt of relatively weak strata between the resistant crystalline rocks of the Adirondacks on the north and the northern escarpment of the Appalachian Plateau (Catskills-Helderbergs) on the south. Early in U.S. history, this provided a vital economic route between the Atlantic seaports and the U.S. interior.

In Wisconsin, the inner lowland is a knob of resistant quartzites, known as Baraboo Ridge, rising from the buried upland floor through the partly denuded cover of lower Palaeozoic strata. This knob or ridge can be thought of as an ancient physiographic fossil, as it is an ancient monadnock having been preserved from destructive attacks of weather by burial under sea-floor deposits. It has been recently re-exposed through the erosion of its cover. The occurrence of the lake basins in the lowland belts on either side of the Niagara escarpment is an abnormal feature. Glacial erosion has formed them through the glacial drift obstructing the normal outlet valleys and to crustal warping in connection with or independent of the glacial sheet.

Lake Superior is unlike the other lakes. The greater part of its basin occupies a depression in the upland area, independent of the overlap of Palaeozoic strata. The western half of the basin occupies a trough of synclinal structure. The Great Lakes receive the drainage of a small peripheral land area, enclosed by a water-parting from the rivers that run to Hudson Bay or the Gulf of Saint Lawrence on the north and to the Gulf of Mexico on the south.

The three lakes of the middle group: Lake Michigan, Lake Huron and Lake Erie stand at practically the same level. Lake Michigan and Lake Huron are connected by the Straits of Mackinac with the Mackinac Bridge spanning the straits. Lake Huron and Lake Erie are connected by the St. Clair River and Detroit River, with the small Lake St. Clair between them. The land northeast of the rivers is undergoing a slow elevation. The Niagara River connecting Lake Erie and Lake Ontario, with a fall of 326 feet (99 m) (160 feet (49 m) at the cataract) in 30 miles (48 km), is thought to have been of recent origin, as an older river would have a mature valley. The original valley that is thought to have connected the two depressions through the Niagara Escarpment is thought to have been at the present route of the Welland Canal, and to have been completely filled with glacial drift. The same is true for the St. Lawrence, where there may not have been an original valley. The Ontarian River that was a precursor to Lake Ontario is thought to have drained westward, and the St. Lawrence drainage to have been created by subsidence due to the weight of the ice sheet.

== History ==
Map of the Great Lakes Basin.

=== Native American history and relationships to the land ===
Indigenous peoples have lived in the Great Lakes region of North America since time immemorial. Five nations: the Mohawk, Oneida, Onondaga, Cayuga, and Seneca historically inhabited the Lake Ontario region, and established the Haudenosaunee (Iroquois) Confederacy, or the People of the Longhouse. West of them were the Wenrohronon. On the Ontario Peninsula was the Neutral Confederacy, Petun Country, and Huronia (Wendake). The Council of Three Fires territories of Anishinaabewaki, also known as the United Nations of Ojibweg, Ottawas, and Potawatomis, covered the lands around Lakes Huron, Michigan, and Superior. To the west of the lakes were a number of Algonquian peoples and their homelands, such as Myaamionki and Algonquian-speaking peoples such as Ojibwe, Potawatomi, Menominee, and Mesquakie (Hoxie, 2016). Also to the West are the Ho-Chunk and, formerly on the coasts of the lakes, the Očhéthi Šakówiŋ or Seven Council Fires of the Dakota and Lakota peoples.

Since time immemorial the Potawatomi have lived in an area of 30 million acres in the Great Lakes region of North America as an ecologically mobile, culturally distinct, and politically independent society. Potawatomi are closely related with Anishinaabe, including Ojibwe and Odawa peoples and usually identify themselves using environmental terms based on where they resided, such as clan animals, or plant terms that refer to kinship relationships with those species. Citizen Potawatomi environmental scholar Kyle Powys Whyte explains that Potawatomi people historically have engaged in political alliances with other indigenous groups, such as the Three Fires Confederacy with Odawa and Ojibwe, and have had a legacy of trading with numerous other indigenous peoples across the Great Lakes and North America.

For many Indigenous peoples in the Great Lakes basin, adaptability to environmental change in the region is a historic concept. Whyte claims that, Potawatomi society identifies as “multispecies”, meaning that “it has its own conceptions of responsibility, agency and value for the hundreds of plants and animals that humans interact with in the Great Lakes region”. In the region, the Potawatomi have maintained kinship and harvesting relationships with hundreds of plants and animals, and they organize culturally and politically through the “‘seasonal round”’ system to adapt to environmental change. Through the seasonal round, the purpose, organization, and size of ceremonies, villages, and bands changes throughout the year depending on which plants and animals need to be harvested, monitored, stored or honored. Whyte claims that this, “attempts to order society to be as responsive as possible to environmental change”.

Scholars of environmental journalism Eric Freedman and Mark Neuzil explain that “Native cultures coevolved with the forests of the Great Lakes region following the last ice age”. Abundant food, game species, and fertile soil supported fishing, gathering, and agriculture in the region. Native communities developed semi-nomadic lifestyles, and moved seasonally among camps, cultivating foods, medicine, supplies, and ceremonial items. For instance, Freedman and Neuzil claim that the Black Ash tree plays a vital role in the cultural continuance of Native American and First Nation peoples in the Great Lakes region. The porous wood of the tree allows the xylem to be separated from it into strips for basket-making. The wood has many uses including “fish weirs, pipe stems, and lacrosse sticks”. In recent years the revival of this centuries-old tradition has become part of a cultural renaissance among tribes in the region and is central to household economies of Native Artisans.

=== European exploration and colonization ===
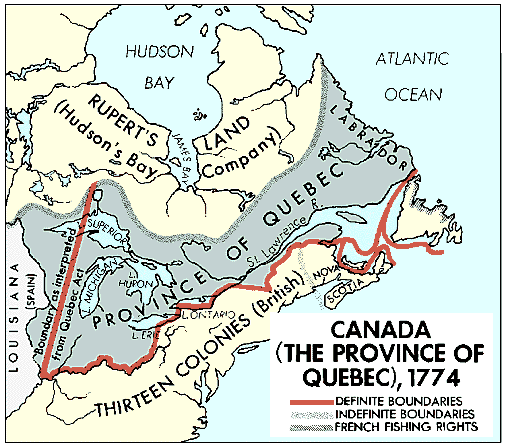
A portion of eastern North America in 1774 after the Quebec Act; Quebec extends all the way to the Mississippi River.

The first European nation to colonize the region were the French, who called the area le Pays d'en Haut, with the English and Dutch navigating the coasts and, for the former, down through Rupert's Land. One of the driving forces behind colonization was the North American fur trade, with European powers integrating themselves into already-developed trade networks, often causing or intensifying tensions such as during the Beaver Wars. While many native peoples engaged in the fur trade with European settlers willingly, Red Cliff Band of Lake Superior Ojibwe citizen and historian Michael John Witgen explains, “the labor of enslaved people had been part of the fur trade since its inception during the colonial era, and most of the prominent fur- trading families in the region owned enslaved Indigenous people, designated as ‘Panis’.

The prospects of fur monopolies and discovery of a fabled Northwest Passage to Asia generated sporadic but intense competition among the three most powerful northwest Europe imperial nations to control the territory. A century and a half of naval and land wars among France, The Netherlands and Britain resulted finally in British control of the region, from the Ohio River to the Arctic, and from the Atlantic to the Mississippi. Beyond the region, North American claims remained disputed among Britain, France, Spain and Russia.

Britain defeated France decisively at the Battle of the Plains of Abraham near Quebec City in 1759, and the Treaty of Paris (1763) that ended The Seven Years' War, known in America as the French and Indian War ceded the entire region to the victor. Indian Reserve is the historical term for this largely uncolonized area set aside in the Royal Proclamation of 1763 for use by Native Americans, who already inhabited it. Historian Jeffery Ostler describes how in the Royal Proclamation of 1763, the British promised to set a boundary between the colonists and Native Americans in the region, however settlers encroached on Native lands leading British officials to redraw the Proclamation line farther west in the 1769 Treaty of Fort Stanwix. Settlers defying the agreement resulted “in widespread conflict with Native peoples”. The British government had contemplated establishing an Indian barrier state in the portion of the reserve west of the Appalachian Mountains, and bounded by the Ohio and Mississippi rivers and the Great Lakes. Britain's claims were intensely disputed by a confederation of Indians during Pontiac's Rebellion, which induced major concessions to still sovereign Indian nations; and by the Iroquois Confederacy, whose six member nations-Mohawk, Oneida, Onondaga, Cayuga, Seneca and Tuscarora-never conceded sovereignty to either Britain or, later, The United States.

During the American Revolution, the region was contested between Britain and rebellious American colonies. Hoping for favorable claims of territorial control in an eventual peace treaty with Britain, American adventurers led by Kentucky militia leader George Rogers Clark briefly occupied village settlements, including Cahokia, Kaskaskia and Vincennes unopposed, with passive support from Francophone inhabitants. In the Peace of Paris (1784) Britain ceded what became known as the Northwest Territory, the area bounded by Great Lakes, Mississippi and Ohio rivers, and the eastern colonies of New York and Pennsylvania, to the fledgling United States. Britain, which may have entertained ambitions to repossess the area if America failed to govern it, retained control over its forts and licensed fur trade for fifteen years. By well-established trade and military routes across the Great Lakes, the British continued to supply not only their own troops but a wide alliance of Native American nations through Detroit, Fort Niagara, Fort Michilimackinac, and so on, until these posts were turned over to the United States following the Jay Treaty (1794).

During the Confederacy Period of 1781–1789, the Continental Congress passed three ordinances whose authority was unclear regarding the region's governance on the American side. According to Witgen, resistance to expansion following the Royal Proclamation of 1763 informed settlers that to continue plans to settle Western territory claimed by the United States, “the United States would need to control the immigration of settlers onto Native lands”. The first attempt resulted in the short-lived Land Ordinance of 1784. The Land Ordinance of 1784 established the broad outlines of future governance. The territory would be divided into six states, which would be given broad powers of constitutional instituting, and admitted to the nation as equal members. Witgen explains, “The Ordinance, and the map drawn by Jefferson to illustrate the outcome of this policy, represented a complete erasure of Native peoples from the political landscape of North America”. The Land Ordinance of 1785 specified the manner in which land would be distributed in the Territory, favoring sale in small parcels to settlers who would work their own farms.

The Northwest Ordinance of 1787 defined the political protocols by which American states south of the lakes would enter the union as political equals with the original thirteen colonies. The ordinance, adopted in its final form just before the writing of the United States Constitution, was a sweeping, visionary proposal to create what was at the time a radical experiment in democratic governance and economy. The Northwest Ordinance of 1787 prohibited slavery, restricted primogeniture, mandated universal public education, provided for affordable farm land to people who settled and improved it, and required peaceful, lawful treatment of the Indian population. The ordinance prohibited the establishment of state religion and established civic rights that foreshadowed the United States Bill of Rights. Civil rights included freedom from cruel and unusual punishment, trial by jury, and exemption from unreasonable search and seizure. States were authorized to organize constitutional conventions and petition for admission as states equal to the original thirteen. Five states evolved from its provisions: Ohio, Indiana, Michigan, Illinois, and Wisconsin. The northeastern section of Minnesota, from the Mississippi to St. Croix River, also fell under ordinance jurisdiction and extended the constitution and culture of the Old Northwest to the Dakotas. According to Witgen, “The ultimate goal of the political project envisioned by the Northwest Ordinance was the dispossession and displacement of the Native population”. The surge of settlement generated tension culminating in the Battle of Fallen Timbers in 1794.

Britain, fearing that fast American settlement could lead to annexation of its western provinces, countered with the Constitutional Act 1791 granting limited self-government to Canadian provinces and creating two new provinces out of Canada: Lower Canada (today's Quebec) and Upper Canada (Ontario).

=== Development of transportation ===
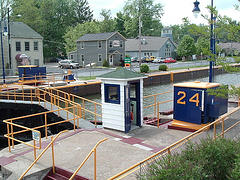
The modern Erie Canal has 34 locks, which are painted with the blue and gold colors of the New York State Canal System

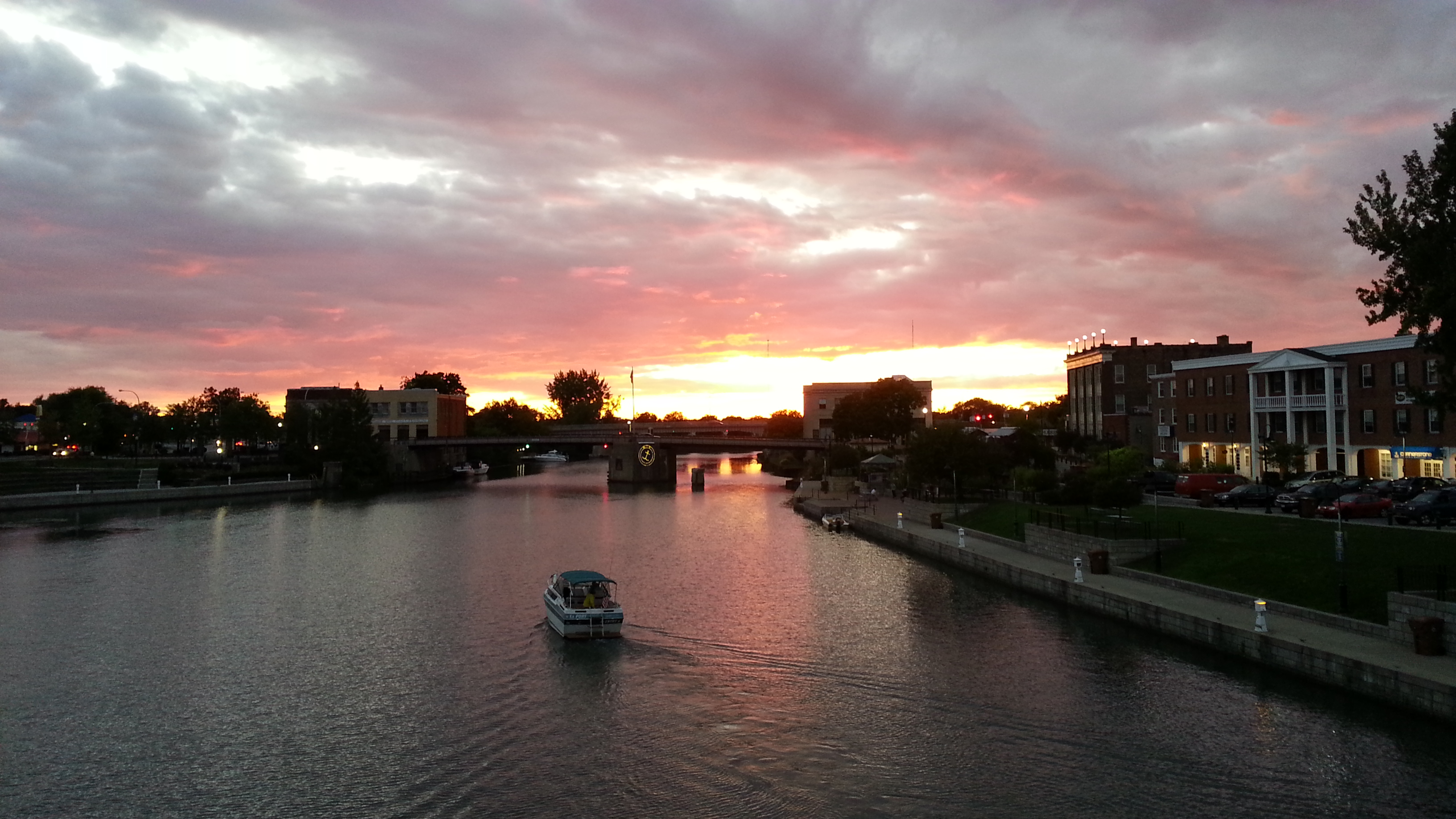
Gateway Harbor in North Tonawanda, about 1000 feet from the present day western terminus of the Erie Canal where it connects to the Niagara River

Settlement and economic expansion on both sides accelerated after the 1825 opening of The Erie Canal, an astonishingly successful public venture that effectively integrated markets and commerce between the Atlantic seaboard and the region. The region on both sides of the border became a vast research and design laboratory for agricultural machinery and techniques. Owner-operator family farms transformed both demographics and ecology into a vast terrain of farmlands, producing primarily wheat and corn. In western New York and northeast Ohio, the St. Lawrence, Mohawk, and Hudson rivers provided outlets for commercial corn and wheat, while The Ohio River let agricultural products from western Pennsylvania and southern Ohio, Indiana and Illinois journey downstream to New Orleans. Mining, primarily soft metals of copper, zinc, and lead; and timber to supply rapidly expanding sawmills that supplied lumber for new settlements.

Agricultural and industrial production generated distinctive political and social cultures of independent republican producers, who consolidated an ideology of personal liberty, free markets, and great social visions, often expressed in religious terms and enthusiasms. The region's alliance of antislavery with free soil movements contributed troops and agricultural goods that proved critical in the Union's victory. The Homestead and Morrill Acts, donating federal land to extend the agrarian economic franchise, and support state universities, modeled western expansion and education for all future states. According to public policy scholar Charles Geisler, the Homestead Acts of 1862, 1909, and 1916 “played out on former Indian lands but brought few monetary rewards to Indians”. As a result, Native peoples in the Great Lakes region were confined to shrinking reservation lands. Additionally, over 10 million acres provided for land grants in the Morrill Act of 1862 were tribal lands of Native communities.

The British-Canadian London Conference of 1866, and subsequent Constitution Act, 1867 analogously derived from political, and some military, turmoil in the former jurisdiction of Upper Canada, which was renamed and organized in the new dominion as the province of Ontario. Like the provisions of the ordinance, Ontario prohibited slavery, made provisions for land distribution to farmers who owned their own land, and mandated universal public education.

=== Immigration and industrialization ===
Industrial production, organization, and technology have made the region among the world's most productive manufacturing centers. Nineteenth-century monopolies such as International Harvester, Standard Oil, and United States Steel established the pattern of American centralized industrial consolidation and eventual global dominance. The region hosted the world's greatest concentrations of production for oil, coal, steel, automobiles, synthetic rubber, agricultural machinery, and heavy transport equipment. Agronomy industrialized as well, in meat processing, packaged cereal products, and processed dairy products. In response to disruptions and imbalances of power resulting from so vast a concentration of economic power, industrial workers organized the Congress of Industrial Organizations, a coherent agricultural cooperative movement, and the Progressive politics led by Wisconsin's Governor and Senator Robert M. La Follette. State universities, professional social work, and unemployment and workers' compensation were some of the region's permanent contributions to American social policy.

The Great Lakes region has produced globally influential breakthroughs in agricultural technology, transportation and building construction. Cyrus McCormick's reaper, John Deere's steel plow, Joseph Dart (Dart's Elevator), and George Washington Snow's balloon-frame construction are some of innovations that made significant, global impact. The University of Chicago and Case Western Reserve University figured prominently in developing nuclear power. Automobile manufacture developed simultaneously in Ohio and Indiana and became centered in the Detroit area of Michigan. Henry Ford's movable assembly line drew on regional experience in meat processing, agricultural machinery manufacture, and the industrial engineering of steel in revolutionizing the modern era of mass production manufacturing. Chicago-based Montgomery Ward and Sears Roebuck companies complemented mass manufactures with mass retail distribution.

Chicago, Detroit, and Cleveland carry important roles in the field of architecture. Chicago pioneered the world's first skyscraper, the Home Insurance Building designed by William LeBaron Jenney. Engineering innovation established Chicago from that time on to become one of the world's most influential epicenters of contemporary urban and commercial architecture. Equally influential was the 1832 invention of balloon-framing in Chicago which replaced heavy timber construction requiring massive beams and great woodworking skill with pre-cut timber. This new lumber could be nailed together by farmers and settlers who used it to build homes and barns throughout the western prairies and plains. Wisconsin-born, Chicago-trained Sullivan apprentice Frank Lloyd Wright designed prototypes for architectural designs from the commercial skylight atrium to suburban ranch house.

German-born Pennsylvania immigrant John A. Roebling invented steel wire rope, a pivotal part of suspension bridges he designed and whose construction he supervised in Pittsburgh, Cincinnati and Buffalo, based on earlier successful canal aqueducts. His most famous project was the Brooklyn Bridge. Contributions to modern transportation include the Wright brothers' early airplanes, designed and perfected in their Dayton, Ohio mechanics' workshops; distinctive Great Lakes freighters, and railroad beds constructed of wooden ties and steel rails. The early nineteenth century Erie Canal and mid-twentieth century St. Lawrence Seaway expanded the scale and capacity of massive water-born freight.

Agricultural associations joined the nineteenth century Grange, which in turn generated the agricultural cooperatives that defined much of rural political economy and culture throughout the region. Fraternal, ethnic, and civic organizations extended cooperatives and supported local ventures from insurance companies to orphanages and hospitals. The region was the political base, and provided much leadership political parties in the region.

The region's greatest institutional contributions were major corporate, labor, educational and cooperative organizations. It hosted some of the most influential national and international corporations of the late nineteenth and early twentieth century monopoly age, including John Deere Plow, McCormack Reaper, New York Central and Erie railroads, Carnegie Steel, U.S. Steel, International Harvester and Standard Oil.

=== 20th century ===
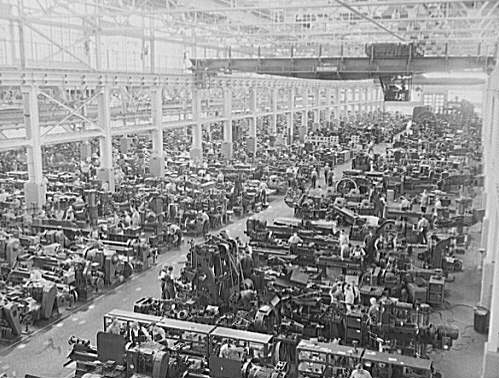
Ford's River Rouge assembly plant 1941

As a result of industrialization, the population became more concentrated into urban areas. In part to balance democratic representation against the economic and political power of these corporations, the region hosted industrial labor organization, consolidated agricultural cooperatives and state educational systems. The Big Ten Conference memorializes the nation's first region in which every state sponsored major research, technical-agricultural, and teacher-training colleges and universities. The Congress of Industrial Organizations grew out of the region's coal and iron mines; steel, automobile and rubber industries; and breakthrough strikes and contracts of Ohio, Indiana, and Michigan.

The role of government also grew during the early 20th century. In the rural areas, most people obtained food and manufactured goods from neighbors and other people they knew personally. As industry and commerce grew, goods such as food, materials, and medicines were no longer made by neighbors, but by large companies. During World War II, the region became the global epicenter of motorized land vehicles, including cars, trucks and jeeps, as well as a major supplier of engine, transmission, and electrical components to the wartime aeronautics industry. Despite extreme labor shortages, the region increased mechanization, and absorbed large numbers of women and immigrant labor, to increase its food production.

=== Indigenous peoples' self-determination and conservation ===
Kyle Powys Whyte, a Citizen Potawatomi environmental scholar, explains that European settlement in North America caused many Native American societies to become separated from local plants, animals, and ecosystems at a rapid pace due to removal and relocation. Practices including deforestation, land contamination through pollution, and commodity agriculture have reshaped ecosystems throughout the nineteenth and twentieth century. Whyte explains that “quite a few indigenous peoples in North America are no longer able to relate locally to many of the plants and animals that are significant to them”. In the face of environmental degradation, indigenous peoples in the Great Lakes region continue to exercise political and cultural self-determination. Potawatomi peoples in the U.S. and Canada for instance exercise self-determination through “having their own government to continuing to identify distinctly as Potawatomi to practicing certain ancient or more recently developed cultural practices associated with being Potawatomi”.

Anishinaabe peoples focus on native species conservation and ecological restoration projects which center local human and non-human relationships and stories within Anishinaabe history that were affected by industrialization practices. One restoration project started by The Little River Band of Ottawa Indians in the 2000s is for the Nmé (Lake Sturgeon), with the goal to “restore the harmony and connectivity between Nmé and the Anishinaabek and bring them both back to the river”. For the Anishinaabe peoples Nmé served as food, an environmental indicator species, and a clan identity, serving a role in ceremonies and stories. Practices including over-harvesting, dams, stocking rivers with non-native fish species for sport fishing, and pollution have reduced historic population numbers to less than one percent. The tribe's Natural Resource Department with both tribal members and biologists “created the first streamside rearing facility for protecting young sturgeon before they are released each fall in order to preserve their genetic parentage”. Additionally, annually in September a public event including a pipe ceremony, feast, speeches, and education about Ottawa traditions takes place, attracting hundreds throughout the watershed, bringing together settlers and indigenous peoples. During the event attendees use buckets to release Nmé back into the river which is said to create a stronger relationship between the people and the sturgeon. Whyte explains, that the restoration of the Nmé shows that “the deep historical relationship between the fish and Anishinaabek can guide innovative restoration and conservation efforts today that can improve environmental quality and heal people’s relationships in the watershed”.

Many Anishinaabe people value water greatly, arising from their creation story in which water is considered to play a role in the source and support of life and relationships between living beings on earth. Whyte explains that water is considered a relative with an intrinsic value and with responsibilities to give and support life and humans, in turn have a responsibility to care for and respect water. Anishinaabe women have a responsibility to water within ceremonies, attending to the water's quality, and developing and passing on knowledge of water and its stewardship to younger generations. Whyte notes however, that climate change in the Great Lakes “are projected to affect the ecological contexts needed for some Anishinaabe women and water to carry out their responsibilities to each other”. Anishinaabe women have engaged in collective action to carry out their responsibilities to water. For instance, a group of elder Anishinaabe women began the ‘Mother Earth Walk’ around the Great Lakes in the early 2000s, engaging in feast, ceremony, and celebration to help people in the basin recognize the spiritual significance of water. Whyte highlights that these collective actions are “changing decision-making processes in Canada”. The creation of the Women's Water Commission has brought Anishinaabe women's voices into Ontario and Great Lakes water issues and encouraged “recognition of traditional responsibilities along with the need to include women as part of the decision-making process”.

== Economy ==
State or Province	2023/2024 GDP (millions of USD)	%
(New York (state)) New York	2,284,364	26.4
Illinois	1,132,143	13.1
Ontario	1,119,545	12.9
Pennsylvania	1,017,257	11.8
Ohio	922,776	10.7
Michigan	703,277	8.1
Indiana	523,832	6.1
Minnesota	497,631	5.8
Wisconsin	448,446	5.2
TOTAL	8,649,271	100.00

=== Manufacturing ===
Navigable terrain, waterways, and ports spurred an unprecedented construction of transportation infrastructure throughout the region. The region is a global leader in advanced manufacturing and research and development, with significant innovations in both production processes and business organization. John D. Rockefeller's Standard Oil set precedents for centralized pricing, uniform distribution, and controlled product standards through Standard Oil, which started as a consolidated refinery in Cleveland. Cyrus McCormick's Reaper and other manufacturers of agricultural machinery consolidated into International Harvester in Chicago. Andrew Carnegie's steel production integrated large-scale open-hearth and Bessemer processes into the world's most efficient and profitable mills. The largest, most comprehensive monopoly in the world, United States Steel, consolidated steel production throughout the region. Historically, iron ore (often in the form of taconite) has been transported upon lake freighters from iron ranges in the Lake Superior region, such as those at Mesabi and Marquette, to steel mills and blast furnaces around the lower lakes for conversion into steel products. Many of the world's largest employers began in the Great Lakes region.

Mass marketing in the modern sense was born in the region. Two competing Chicago retailers—Montgomery Ward and Sears Roebuck—developed mass marketing and sales through catalogues, mail-order distribution, and the establishment of their brand names as purveyors of consumer goods. The region's natural features, cultural institutions, and resorts make it a popular destination for tourism.

Advantages of accessible waterways, highly developed transportation infrastructure, finance, and a prosperous market base make the region the global leader in automobile production and a global business location. Henry Ford's movable assembly line and integrated production set the model and standard for major car manufactures. The Detroit area emerged as the world's automotive center, with facilities throughout the region. Akron, Ohio became the global leader in rubber production, driven by the demand for tires. Over 200 million tons of cargo are shipped annually through the Great Lakes.

According to the Brookings Institution, if it stood alone as a country, the Great Lakes economy would be one of the largest economic units on Earth (with a $6-trillion gross regional product). This region also contains what area urban planners call the Great Lakes Megalopolis, which has an estimated 59 million people. Chicago is emerging as the third megacity in the United States, after the New York City and Los Angeles metropolitan areas, with a metro population approaching ten million. Toronto is the largest city in Canada and the fourth largest city proper in North America behind Mexico City, New York City and Los Angeles. Cities along the Great Lakes have access to the Atlantic Ocean through the St. Lawrence Seaway, making them international ports.

=== Financial ===
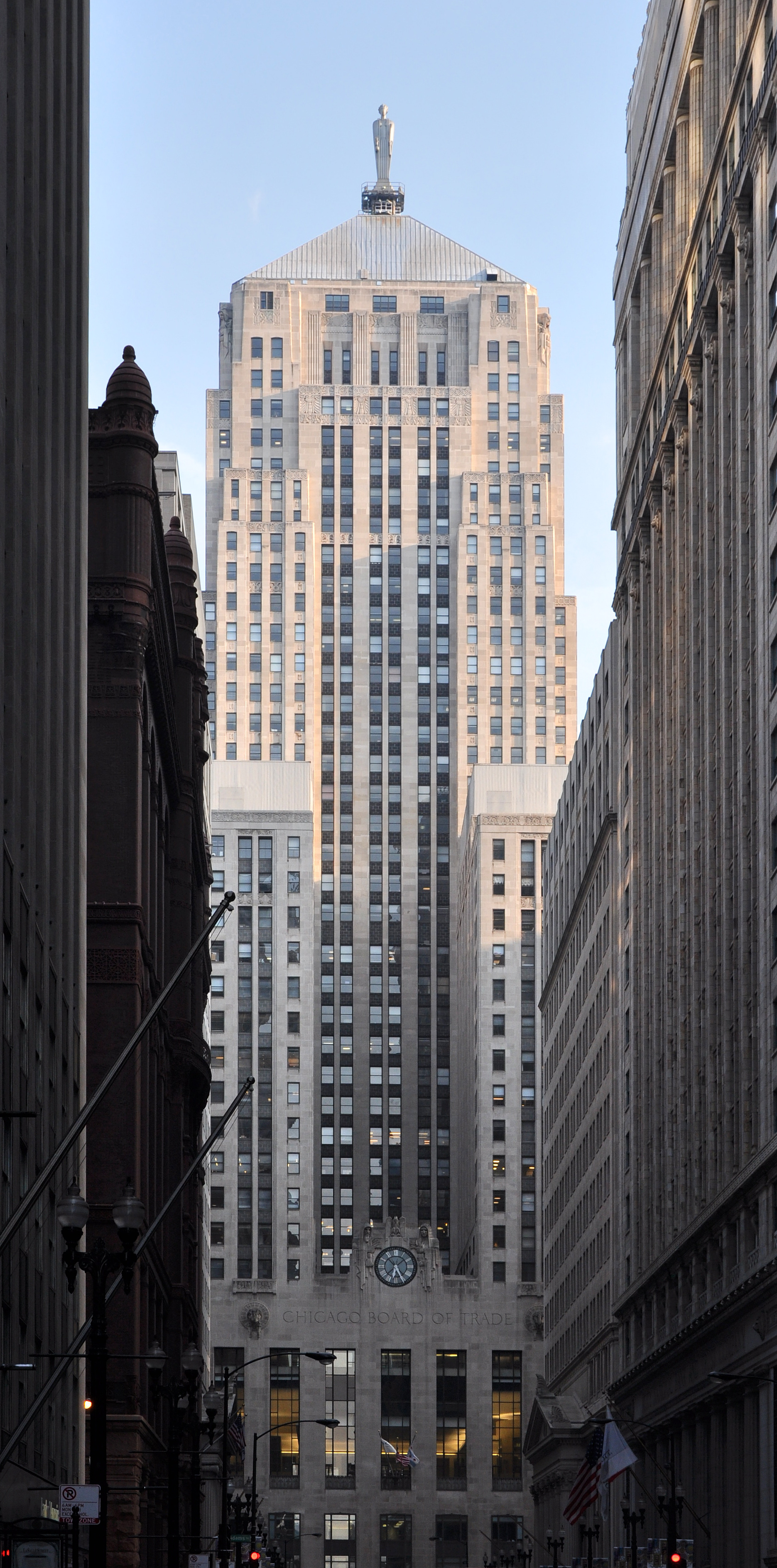
The Chicago Board of Trade Building a National Historic Landmark

Chicago is the largest economic and financial center. Chicago was named the fourth most important business center in the world in the MasterCard Worldwide Centers of Commerce Index. The 2017 Global Financial Centres Index ranked Chicago as the twenty-fourth most competitive city in the world, behind Toronto, also in the Great Lakes region, at seventh. The Chicago Board of Trade (established 1848) listed the first ever standardized "exchange traded" forward contracts, which were called futures contracts. As a world financial center it is home to major financial and futures exchanges, including the Chicago Stock Exchange, the Chicago Board Options Exchange (CBOE), and the Chicago Mercantile Exchange (the "Merc"), which is owned, along with the Chicago Board of Trade (CBOT) by Chicago's CME Group. The CME Group, in addition, owns the New York Mercantile Exchange (NYMEX), the Commodities Exchange Inc. (COMEX), and the Dow Jones Indexes., as well as headquarters of the Federal Reserve Bank of Chicago (the Seventh District of the Federal Reserve).

Toronto is an international centre for business and finance. Generally considered the financial capital of Canada, Toronto has a high concentration of banks and brokerage firms on Bay Street, in the Financial District. The Toronto Stock Exchange (TSX) is the world's seventh-largest stock exchange by market capitalization. The five largest financial institutions of Canada, collectively known as the Big Five, have their global operational headquarters in Toronto.

Outside of Chicago and Toronto, many other cities are host to financial centers as well. Major bank headquarters are located in Ohio including Huntington Bancshares in Columbus, Fifth Third Bank in Cincinnati, M&T Bank in Buffalo, and KeyCorp in Cleveland. Insurance companies such as Anthem in Indianapolis, Nationwide Insurance in Columbus, American Family Insurance in Madison, Wisconsin, State Farm Insurance in Bloomington, Illinois, and Progressive Insurance and Medical Mutual of Ohio in Cleveland.

== Population centers ==
Rank	Area	State/ Province	Image	CSA/CMA 2021 population	Projected 2025 population	Projected increase 2010–2025
1	Chicago	Illinois; Indiana; Wisconsin		8,877,000	11,250,100	1,530,255
2	Toronto	Ontario		6,202,000	7,408,000	1,666,600
3	Detroit	Michigan		5,327,764	6,191,000	863,236
4	Cleveland	Ohio		3,515,646	3,795,658	280,012
5	Milwaukee	Wisconsin		1,760,268	1,913,000	157,732
6	Buffalo	New York		1,203,493	1,040,400	-163,093
7	Rochester	New York		1,149,653	1,248,600	98,947
8	Hamilton	Ontario		740,200	954,858	214,658
9	Toledo	Ohio		672,220	672,220	0
10	St. Catharines–Niagara	Ontario		404,400	521,676	117,276
11	Windsor	Ontario		330,900	426,861	95,961
12	Erie	Pennsylvania		280,985	N/A	N/A

== Environmental Justice ==
=== Environmental degradation ===
The Great Lakes are essential for drinking, farming, industry, transportation, recreation, shipping, and wildlife, making up the world's largest surface freshwater system. It is estimated that around 33 million people reside within the basin. Whyte explains that while “the Great Lakes region has a high proportion of the world’s fresh water supply, things have changed in recent times”. The waters have endured pollutants from agricultural runoff, sewage disposal, and contamination from local industries, such as mercury. Pollution-driven “challenges to habitat and biodiversity have economic, political, national security, and cultural implications and ramifications that cross the U.S.– Canadian border”, explains Freedman and Neuzil. Research led by urban planning and policy scholars Rolf Pendall, Erika Poethig, and Mark Treskon describes how such issues of pollution in the Great Lakes region accompany many of the country's social, economic, and political challenges. Throughout the region, neighborhoods are segregated by income and race. The legacy of polluted industrial and public works sites disproportionately affects these low-income and minority neighborhoods.

The environmental impacts in the basin can be traced back to the formation of cities along the Great Lakes and the St. Lawrence River as well as mega-projects such as the St. Lawrence Seaway to the Erie Canal and the creation of superhighway networks. While there are no precise figures on the number of critically endangered, endangered, and vulnerable species in the basin, lists compiled by the U.S. and Canadian government agencies are long. The International Union for the Conservation of Nature (IUCN) cites this data gap as a lack of full evaluation. Some species in the basin, however, have already gone extinct, most notably the passenger pigeon, said to be “vast in 1860 but virtually gone by 1900” primarily because of habitat and food loss from deforestation. In the twentieth century, rapid industrialization and new technologies led to contamination of the Great Lakes. “Until the 1970s, persistent organic pollutants, heavy metals, and contaminants from industrial and agricultural uses entered the lakes via intentional discharges”, according to scholars Freedman and Neuzil. In the late 1960s the basin's toxic chemical problem gained attention, catalyzing pollution control measures including the creation of the Great Lakes Water Quality Agreement (GLWQA) and the Clean Water Act (CWA) in 1972 which is still relied upon today. These movements committed the U.S. and Canada to restore and protect the lakes and established a framework for the regulation of pollutants. The GLWQA for instance, established monitoring programs identifying chemical pollutants as the primary cause of observed health problems such as “fish and wildlife population declines, gross malformations, and developmental disorders”. In 2010 contamination monitoring had a resurgence through the White House funded Great Lakes Restoration Initiative Action Plan, calling for clean ups of Areas of Concern (AOC) and historically contaminated sites. Freedman and Neuzil describe, however, that the Great Lakes continue to present complex challenges associated with chemical contamination.

=== Impact on minority communities ===
Geologist and oceanographer Kathryn Sullivan and climate change and justice policy assistant Lauren White describe how climate change in the Great Lakes region will exacerbate inequalities of socioeconomic status. Sullivan and White explain that “those with more power and influence are usually in a position to proactively protect themselves from potential hazards and recover more quickly from impacts while those with low socioeconomic power often do not have the wealth and influence for such built resilience”.

The Great Lakes provide drinking water for 40 million people, making up nearly 20 percent of the world's fresh drinking water. Freedman and Neuzil show that since the mid-1800s due to human influence, Lake Erie has experienced “the greatest changes in water quality and biology”. During the late 1960, Lake Erie was perceived to be “dying”, which local agencies attributed to high phosphorus levels. On August 2, 2014, in Toledo, Ohio, an order was issued to its 450,000 residents, to avoid drinking tap water after a toxic bloom of cyanobacteria known as Mycrocystis appeared in Lake Erie, where the city's municipal water supply is drawn from. According to the United States Census Bureau as of April 1, 2010, Toledo, Ohio residents had a median household income of $49,724 which is below the national average.

In 1980, the Superfund law was created to provide federal funding and enforcement of clean up for hazardous waste sites. As of 2020, the state of Michigan had 65 sites on the Superfund's National Priorities List (NPL). Reporter and editor Jeff Karoub explains that vulnerable communities in Michigan are disproportionately exposed to such pollution, resulting from income inequality, discrimination, and the intentional implementation of factories in low-cost locations. Additionally, throughout the state, governmental air-quality monitoring is limited and there are instances of companies being prosecuted for tampering with equipment or obscuring pollution levels. Due to a lack of research, there is limited and missing information on how such pollution has impacted the health of vulnerable communities as compared to other groups.

Flint Michigan is a majority-black city where 40 percent of residents live in poverty. Law scholar Johnathon Lubrano explains that the Michigan Department of Civil Rights blames systematic racism in the housing market for the racially and economically slanted demographic of Flint. After the Fair Housing Act was passed in 1968, which allowed racial minorities to purchase homes in the city, property values dropped causing financially stable white families to flee, leaving homes unsold. On April 25, 2014, Flint Michigan, switched its water source from the Detroit Water and Sewage Department to the Flint River as an interim water source while the city made a permanent switch to the Karegnondi Water Authority (KWA) in an attempt to save $200 million. By the next month however, residents were complaining about the water's color and smell. Kennedy Merrit, an NPR reporter and scholar in international human rights law explains that in August 2014, E. coli and Coliform Bacteria were detected in Flint's water, causing advisories for residents to boil their water and the city to increase water chlorine levels. On January 2, 2015, Flint was found to be in violation of the Safe Drinking Water Act due to high levels of trihalomethanes (TTHMs), disinfectant byproducts from the interaction between chlorine and organic matter in the water. According to the CDC, some types of TTHMs are possible carcinogens for humans. In response, the state began buying bottled water for government employees. These events were followed by reports to the EPA that “the city did not have corrosion control treatment in place at the Flint Water Treatment Plant”. On September 25, 2015, Flint issued a lead advisory to residents after studies found elevated lead levels in children, and in December both Flint Mayor Karen Weaver and President Barack Obama declared a state of emergency over elevated lead levels in the city's water supply On January 21, the EPA followed suit declaring an emergency order in Flint.

Lubrano argues that “Flint is a clear example of the need for greater environmental justice in the United States”. Lubrano explains, ultimately the decision to switch Flint's water source was “in order to save money”. On February 17, 2016, Michigan Governor Rick Snyder testified before the House Committee on Oversight and Government Reform, stating in his opening remarks that all levels of government “failed the families of Flint”.

== See also ==
- Conference of Great Lakes and St. Lawrence Governors and Premiers
- Great Lakes Integrated Sciences and Assessments
- Great Lakes Megalopolis
- Flora of the Great Lakes region
- Index: Great Lakes
- Great Lakes WATER Institute, largest academic freshwater research facility on the Great Lakes
- Midwestern United States
- Quebec City – Windsor Corridor
- Southern Ontario
- The Great Lakes region in baseball's Little League World Series
- Great Recycling and Northern Development Canal
