= Capstone =

Capstone may refer to:

== Architecture ==
- Keystone (architecture), also known as a capstone

== Brands and enterprises ==
- Capstone Copper, Canadian mining company with assets in Chile, Mexico and the US, successor of Capstone Mining
- Capstone Investment Advisors, a US investment management firm
- Capstone Partners, an investment banking firm
- Capstone Publishers, a children's educational book publisher
- Capstone Records, an American classical music record label
- Capstone Software, a computer game company
- Capstone Turbine, a microturbine manufacturer

== Education ==
- AP Capstone, an American course for high school students developed by the College Board
- The Capstone, a nickname for the University of Alabama campus
- Capstone course or capstone unit, the culminating element of an educational program
- Capstone Military Leadership Program, a training course for U.S. generals and admirals

== Other uses ==
- Capstone (cryptography), a US government project for cryptographic standardization
- CAPSTONE (spacecraft), a lunar orbiter
- Capstone Farm Country Park, a nature reserve and park near Gillingham, Kent, United Kingdom
- Capstone model of marriage, and approach to marriage as a crowning achievement, to be pursued after completion of personal goals

== See also ==
- Caprock, a harder or more resistant rock type overlying a weaker or less resistant rock type
- Monadnock, an isolated rock hill, knob, ridge, or small mountain
