= Camco Financial =

Bank holding company

Camco Financial Corporation
- Company type: Public
- Traded as: Nasdaq: CAFI
- Industry: Financial services
- Founded: 1970
- Headquarters: Cambridge, Ohio, U.S.
- Key people: James Huston (chairman & CEO)
- Operating income: ▲US$ 31.623 million (2012)
- Net income: ▲US$ 4.163 million (2012)
- Total assets: ▲US$ 764.259 million (2012)
- Number of employees: 200(2012)

Camco Financial Corporation, or Camco Financial, headquartered in Cambridge, Ohio, was a registered bank holding company under the law of Delaware. It wholly owned the Ohio-based Advantage Bank and operated 22 offices in Ohio, Kentucky and West Virginia. Camco offered a wide range of banking services through Advantage Bank. As of December 31, 2012, Camco had $764.259 million in total assets, $59.727 million in total stockholders' equity and $627.224 million in deposits.

Camco ended in 2014, following a merger with Huntington Bancshares.

== History ==
On October 19, 1970, Camco Financial Corporation was organized as a holding company.

In June, 2001, Camco Financial Corporation finished the reorganization and it combined the banking activities under the Advantage Bank.

In 2004 Camco Financial Corporation merged with London Financial Corporation of London, Ohio, along with its wholly owned subsidiary, The Citizens Bank of London.

In 2013, the corporation declared the termination of a Consent Order dating back to February 9, 2012, issued by the Federal Deposit Insurance Corporation (FDIC) and the State of Ohio's Department of Commerce, Division of Financial Institutions (Ohio Division).

In 2013, Camco was purchased by Huntington Bancshares. The merger was complete by March 2014, ending Camco Financial's independent existence.
