= Sky Financial Group =

Defunct American Bank

- Founded: 1998 in Bowling Green, Ohio, United States
- Defunct: July 1, 2008
- Fate: Acquisition by Huntington
- Headquarters: Bowling Green, Ohio, United States
- Key people: Marty Adams, Chairman, CEO, and President
- Net income: $348 million

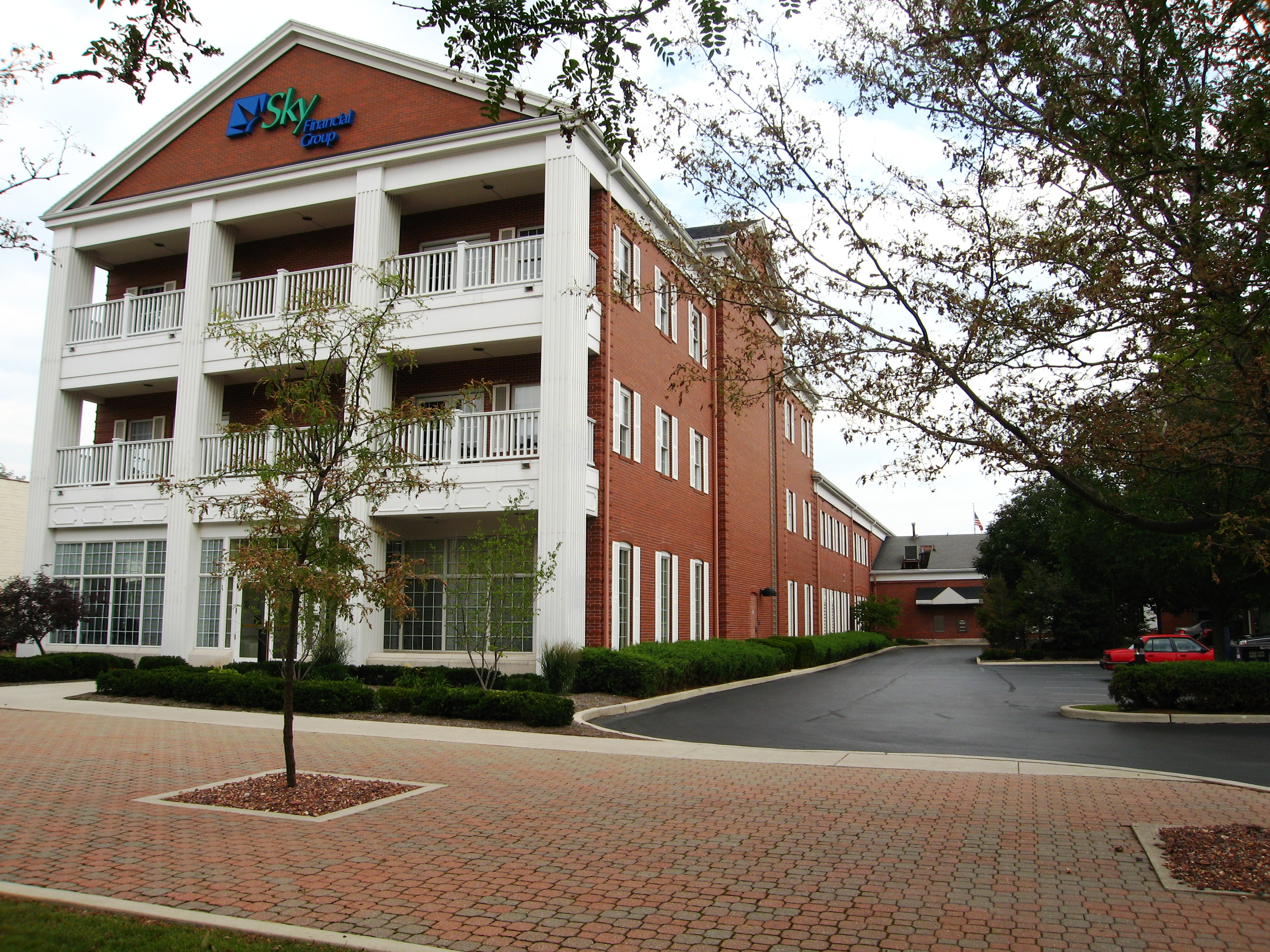
The Sky Financial Group, Inc. headquarters building in downtown Bowling Green, Ohio

Sky Financial Group, Inc., was a diversified financial services holding company that operated in the Midwestern United States from 1998 until its 2008 acquisition by rival bank Huntington Bancshares. Its largest subsidiary was Sky Bank, a commercial and retail banking company headquartered in Salineville, Ohio, that operated 330 financial centers and over 400 ATMs in Ohio, Pennsylvania, Indiana, Michigan and West Virginia. Other wholly owned subsidiaries included investment, trust, and insurance services.

Sky Financial Group was headquartered in Bowling Green, Ohio, and was formed by the 1998 "merger of equals" of the $2.2 billion Mid Am, Inc., of Bowling Green and the $1.8 billion Citizens Bancshares, Inc., of Salineville. The resulting $4 billion company ranked as the 96th largest American bank. At the time of its 2008 acquisition by Huntington, Sky Financial Group was the 43rd largest bank holding company in the country with over $17.6 billion in assets. The company had 4330 employees.

== Huntington acquisition ==
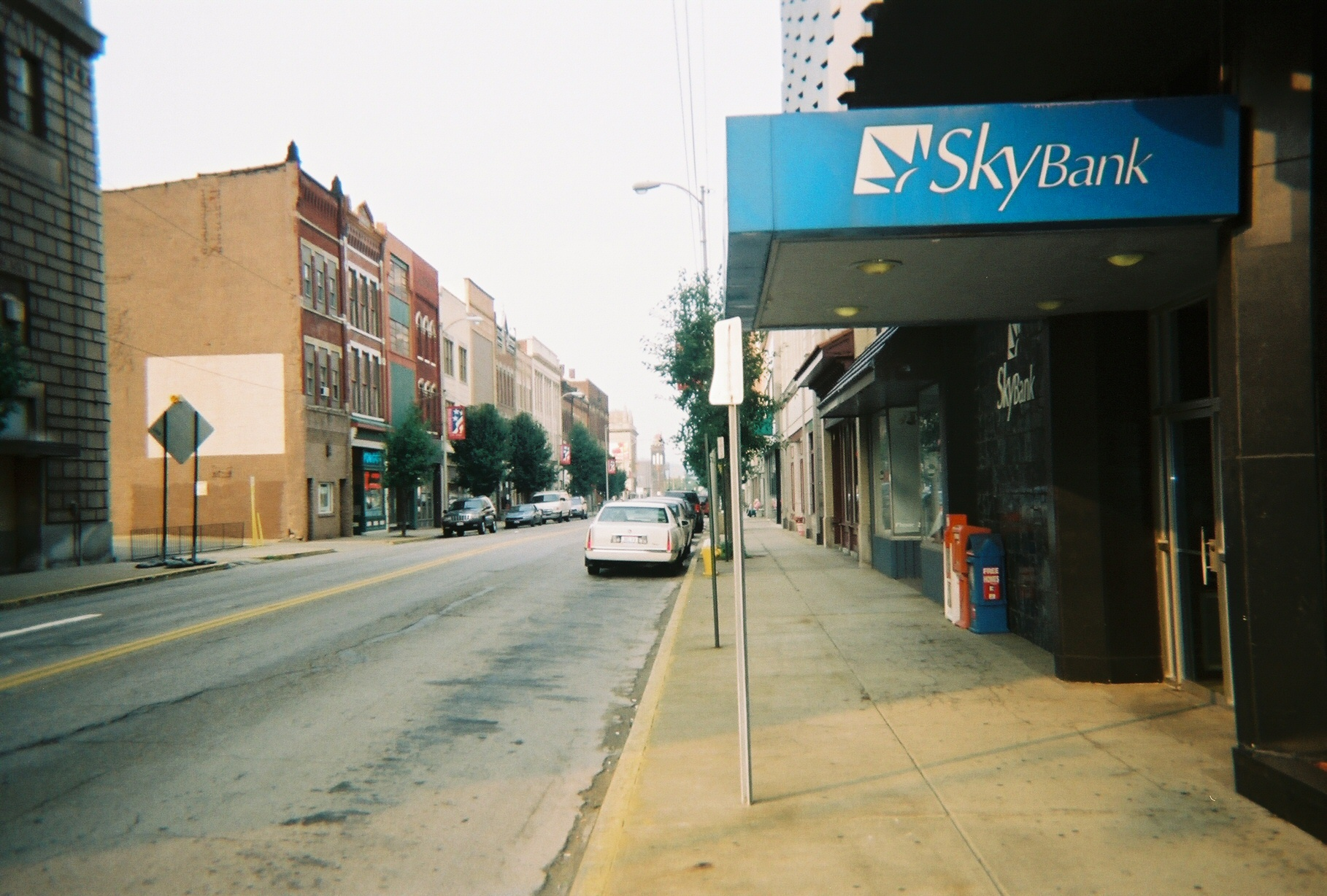
Former SkyBank branch in downtown Steubenville, Ohio, currently a Huntington branch.

On December 20, 2006, Sky Financial Group announced that Huntington Bancshares, based out of Columbus, Ohio, would be taking over the company. This was considered a merger, with Huntington Bancshares taking the upper hand. Beginning in March 2007, Sky and Huntington began consolidating and closing redundant offices. When completed, Sky's major operations centers in Bowling Green, Ohio, Toledo, Ohio, Cleveland, Ohio, and East Liverpool, Ohio, were then closed. Additionally, 88 banking centers (about 25% of Sky's total footprint) were consolidated. Huntington's withdrawal in these markets has resulted in their weakening economically. Several have questioned the impact on local economy this merger will have on the communities where Sky and Huntington co-exist, including former Ohio Congressman Dennis Kucinich (D-Cleveland). Kucinich had asked the Cleveland Federal Reserve Bank to hold hearings concerning the Sky-Huntington merger. The Federal Reserve approved the merger without regard to Kucinich's requests.

== Acquisition and merger history ==
Prior to its merger with Huntington Bancshares, Sky completed fourteen acquisitions and mergers during its nine years of operation.

Date announced	Company	Notes
August 24, 2006	Wells River Bancorp	Wells River Bancorp operated Perpetual Savings, a $74.7 million bank with 3 offices in Columbiana County, Ohio.
August 9, 2006	Waterfield Mortgage Company	Waterfield Mortgage operated Union Federal, a $2.5 billion bank with 42 branches in Indiana. Union Federal Bank was the fourth largest bank in Indianapolis, Indiana.
June 21, 2005	Falls Bank	Falls Bank was an $83.6 million bank that operated two full-service branches in the Akron, Ohio market.
December 22, 2004	Belmont Bancorp	Belmont had $297 million in assets and 12 branches in the Wheeling, West Virginia area. Sky now has 280 branches.
September 17, 2004	Prospect Bancshares	Prospect had $202 million in assets and four branches in the Columbus, Ohio area.
January 8, 2004	Second Bancorp	Second was $2.1 billion in assets and operated 33 branches in the Warren, Ohio area. Sky now has nearly $15 billion in assets and over 260 offices.
July 16, 2003	GLB Bancorp	GLB Bancorp operated Great Lakes Bank, with 13 branches in Lake and Cuyahoga counties.
October 24, 2002	Metropolitan Financial Corp.	Metropolitan Bank was a $1.5 billion bank that operated 30 offices in the Cleveland area. Sky now has 254 financial centers and $12.5 billion in assets, making it the 54th largest bank holding company in the country.
May 5, 2002	Three Rivers Bancorp	Three Rivers was a $1 billion commercial bank with 25 offices in the metropolitan Pittsburgh, Pennsylvania area.
July 11, 2001	Standard Federal Bank	Standard Federal Bank sold ten northwest Ohio offices. Sky now has 205 financial centers and has #2 market share in Wood and Lucas counties.
June 7, 1999	Mahoning National Bancorp	Mahoning National was an $809 million bank holding company headquartered in Youngstown, Ohio that operated 20 banking offices in Mahoning and Trumbull counties. Sky Financial now has $7.7 billion in assets and ranked 66th largest bank holding company in America.
December 17, 1998	Wood Bancorp	Wood Bancorp operated First Federal Bank, a $166 million federal savings bank with seven offices in Wood County, Ohio.
December 14, 1998	First Western Bancorp	First Western was a $2.2 billion bank holding company headquartered in New Castle, Pennsylvania. Sky Financial now a $7 billion financial services organization with 210 banking centers.
July 22, 1998	The Ohio Bank	The Ohio bank had over $600 million in assets and operated 18 branches with 250 employees. It was the number one market share holder in Hancock and Putnam counties.
May 22, 1998	Mid Am and Citizens Bancshares	Merger of equals between the $2.2 billion Mid Am, Inc. and the $1.8 billion Citizens, Inc. resulting in a combined bank with 144 branches and over 2,300 employees.
