= Capstone model of marriage =

The capstone model of marriage is a sociological framework describing contemporary marriage as a form of status symbol or achievement that occurs later in the transition to adulthood, rather than a foundational event. The concept is largely attributed to family sociologist Andrew Cherlin, who argued in 2004 that marriage has evolved from a "marker of conformity" to a "marker of prestige" and introduced the term "capstone".

== Concept ==
In the capstone model, marriage is viewed as a "crowning experience" for the couple that has "made it" into successful adulthood. Under this framework, young adults voluntarily delay marriage to focus on individual goals, such as completing higher education, establishing a career, achieving financial stability, and fully exploring their own identities. Marriage is treated as the final "capstone" placed atop these other milestones have been achieved, rather than a method for achieving them.

The capstone model is a dominant cultural norm in the United States, with the median age of the first marriage rising to approximately 30 for men and 28 for women by 2021. Brookings Institution economist Richard Reeves noted that for many contemporary young adults, marriage is viewed as the "last box [to] tick" in their development, rather than a vehicle for achieving other developmental boxes. Surveys of Millennials (ages 18–33) indicate widespread support for this model, with a vast majority agreeing that delaying marriage results in greater maturity, better personal financial stability, and an improved likelihood of relationship success.

== Historical evolution ==
Cherlin traces the emergence of the capstone model through two major transitions in the meaning of marriage during the 20th century:

- From institutional to companionate: (using the words of Ernest Burgess): In the early 20th century, marriage transitioned from an institution focused on survival and duty to the "companionate marriage" (peaking in the 1950s). In this model, spouses adhered to sharp gender roles (breadwinner/homemaker) but sought emotional satisfaction and friendship within the nuclear family.
- From companionate to individualized: Beginning in the 1960s, the "individualized marriage" emerged. As wives entered the workforce and roles became flexible, the criteria for marital success shifted from role performance to self-development and personal expression.

It is within this "individualized" context that the capstone model solidified. Because marriage is no longer strictly necessary for economic survival, sexual activity, or childbearing (due to the rise of cohabitation and single parenthood), its practical dominance has declined while its symbolic status has risen. Marriage has transformed into a "super-relationship" used to display personal achievement and a prestigious style of life.

== Symbolic significance ==
A key feature of the capstone model is the elevation of the wedding ceremony into a status symbol. Cherlin notes that despite the decline in marriage rates, elaborate, ritual-filled weddings have not disappeared; instead, they have become occasions for consumption and signaling financial security.

Even among low-income populations where marriage rates are low, the capstone ideal persists. Research indicates that many low-income couples view marriage as an elusive goal that must be deferred until they can afford a "big" wedding and a middle-class lifestyle, effectively barring them from the institution until those economic standards are met.

=== Enforceable trust ===
While the capstone model emphasizes symbolic prestige, Cherlin argues that marriage retains a practical function through "enforceable trust." Unlike cohabitation, which requires only a private commitment, marriage requires a public commitment in front of family and the state. This lowers the risk of abandoning the relationship and allows partners to invest more deeply in long-term joint assets, such as property or "relationship-specific" investments in children.

== Contrast with cornerstone model ==
The primary alternative to the capstone model is the cornerstone marriage (or "foundation") model. In this approach, couples marry in their early twenties (typically ages 20–24) and navigate the transition to adulthood together.

Proponents of the cornerstone model argue that it fosters a shared "we-dentity" rather than a merger of two settled individual "i-dentities". While the capstone model emphasizes individual "readiness" and financial independence prior to the wedding, the cornerstone model relies on the couple building their financial and personal lives jointly from a younger age.

== Outcomes and analysis ==
The "State of Our Unions 2022" report, a joint publication by the University of Virginia's National Marriage Project and Brigham Young University, analyzed data to compare the outcomes of "early-marrieds" (cornerstone) versus "later-marrieds" (capstone).

Contrary to the popular belief that delaying marriage consistently leads to better outcomes, the study found little empirical evidence to favor the capstone model over the cornerstone model:

- Stability and Satisfaction: The study found no significant advantage for later marriages regarding stability. In some measures, "cornerstone" marriages (excluding teen marriages) reported slightly higher relationship quality and sexual satisfaction than "capstone" marriages.
- Divorce Risk: While teen marriage remains a high risk factor for divorce, the study found no clear difference in divorce risk between those marrying in their early twenties versus those marrying later. Research suggests that marrying before age of 22 indeed carries a noticeably higher risk, but the decrease in divorce rates between 22 and 30 is small and incremental. For religious women who do not cohabit before marriage, there was no added divorce risk associated with marrying in the early twenties.

=== Societal impact ===
Legal scholar Lynn Wardle argues that the shift toward the capstone model has contributed to a "marriage crisis" where marriage is increasingly viewed as an optional lifestyle choice rather than a social imperative. Research correlating high levels of marriage with economic growth suggests that states with higher percentages of married-parent families experience higher per capita GDP, greater economic mobility for children from lower-income families, and lower child poverty rates. Conversely, the declining rates of marriage incurs significant public costs related to antipoverty programs, criminal justice, and education.

== Capstone model flaws ==
The 2022 report identifies several potential "engineering flaws" or paradoxes within the capstone model:

- Paradoxical preparation: The extended period of singlehood required by the capstone model often leads to an accumulation of relationship history, including multiple sexual partners and serial cohabitation. Research cited in the report links these factors to lower marital quality and higher divorce risks, suggesting that the "preparation" period may actually diminish marital prospects.
- Resequencing of family formation: Because the biological window for female fertility does not shift with social norms, the delay of marriage has led to a "resequencing" where childbearing increasingly occurs before marriage. This resequencing is illustrated by the "Great Crossover": the moment when the median age of first birth dropped below the median age of first marriage, a shift that occurred in the United States around 1990. Consequently, roughly half of all first births in the U.S. in the late 2010s were to unmarried women, almost doubling the rate seen in 1985.
- Marriage forgone: By setting the bar for marriage at a high level of economic and educational achievement, the capstone model may make marriage inaccessible for lower-income or less-educated individuals, turning marriage into a luxury good rather than a broadly accessible institution. Wardle quotes Ross Douthat, "marriage delayed can mean marriage forgone," particularly for those who cannot meet the high economic prerequisites of the capstone ideal.
- Focus on Self: The report suggests that the "settled self" developed during a long period of individual independence may be less adaptable (in contrast to the "softer personal clay" of an early marriage), making the merger of lives in a capstone marriage potentially more difficult than growing together in a cornerstone marriage.

== Benefits of a delayed marriage ==
There are known benefits of delaying the marriage, especially for females:

- for college-educated women, the difference in personal income for college-educated married women who married in their thirties and the ones married before age twenty, by the time both groups reached their mid-thirties, was about 18 thousand dollars annually. Their household income was also higher;
- rate of divorce for women married in their teens and, to some extent, in the early twenties, was much higher.

Experience of men without a four-year degree is the opposite: the earlier the marriage, the higher their future income. The college-educated men also benefit financially from marrying in their twenties as opposed to thirties.

== Sources ==
- Cherlin, Andrew J. (2004). "The Deinstitutionalization of American Marriage". Journal of Marriage and Family. 66 (4): 848–861.
- Hawkins, Alan J.; Carroll, Jason S.; Jones, Anne Marie Wright; James, Spencer L. (2022). State of Our Unions 2022: Capstones vs. Cornerstones: Is Marrying Later Always Better? (Report). National Marriage Project at the University of Virginia, the Wheatley Institution, and the School of Family Life at Brigham Young University.
- Wardle, Lynn D. (2018). "Cornerstone or Capstone: The Need to Revive (and How to Renew) a Culture of Marriage". Quinnipiac Law Review. 36 (2): 153–182.
