= Ontarian River =

The Ontarian River is the term used for the pre-glacial river that began the creation of the valley in Silurian age shales and limestones now occupied by Lake Ontario. The valley was greatly deepened by glacial action during the Ice age.

The original flow is thought to have been westward beginning from the Laurentian shield in the present area of the St. Lawrence River to eventually join the Mississippi River drainage system.

During continental glaciation, the tremendous weight of the glacier depressed the area of the St. Lawrence so much that a lower point of drainage was established eastward through the present river system. The area is still rebounding, however, and the rise could further rearrange drainage within geologic time by raising the outlet of Lake Ontario sufficient for it to drain at some other, lower point.

== See also ==
- Laurentian River System (Ontario)
