= Capstone Partners =

US investment bank

Capstone Partners is a full service middle market investment bank headquartered in Boston, Massachusetts. The firm was founded in 2001, at that time a wholly owned subsidiary of Arthur Andersen. In 2002 the firm's current President John Ferrara legally incorporated the group as Capstone Partners. Having completed eight transactions over the past 20 years, including the acquisition of Denver, Colorado–based investment bank Headwaters MB, the firm now has over 350 employees across multiple offices in the United States with a particular focus on serving the full business lifecycle needs of business owners, investors and creditors in the middle market. On June 16, 2022, Capstone Partners was acquired by Huntington Bancshares Incorporated (Nasdaq: HBAN).
