= National Register of Historic Places listings in Akron, Ohio =

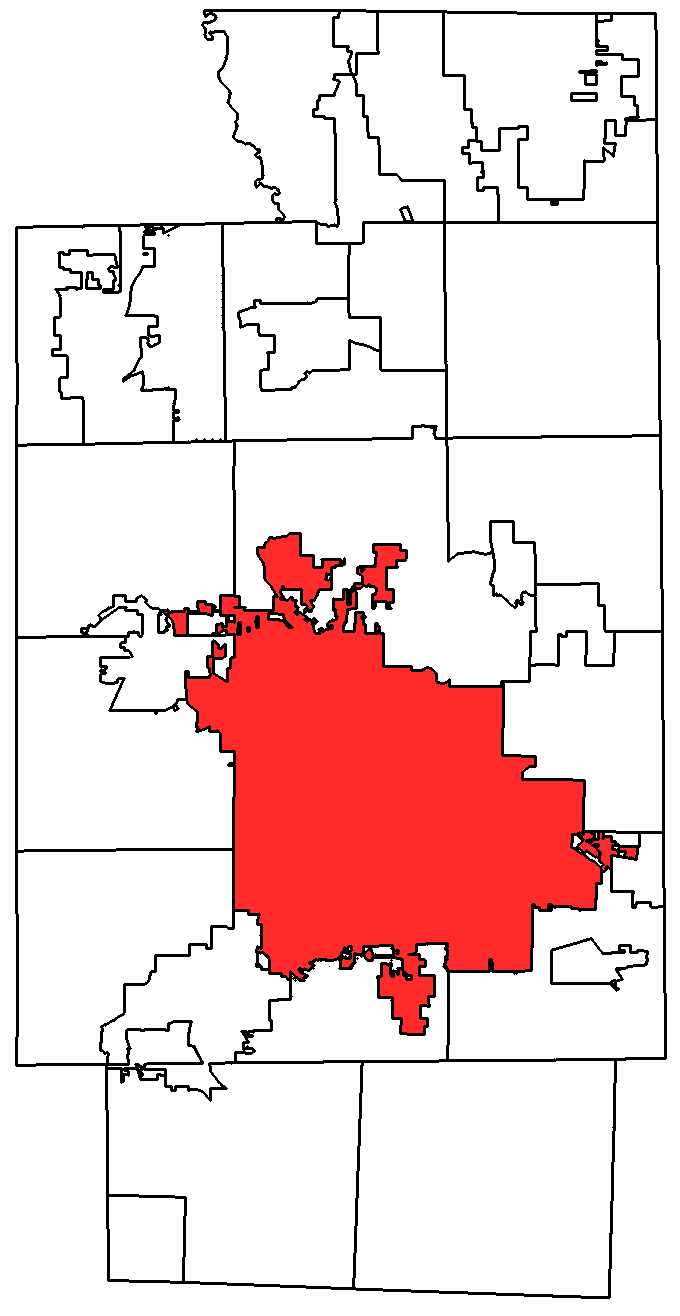
Location of Akron in Summit County

This is a list of the National Register of Historic Places listings in Akron, Ohio.

This is intended to be a complete list of the properties and districts on the National Register of Historic Places in Akron, Ohio, United States. Latitude and longitude coordinates are provided for many National Register properties and districts; these locations may be seen together in an online map.

There are 188 properties and districts listed on the National Register in Summit County, including 3 National Historic Landmarks. The city of Akron is the location of 64 of these properties and districts, including 2 of the National Historic Landmarks; they are listed here, while the 124 sites and 1 National Historic Landmark located elsewhere in Summit County are listed separately. One district, the Valley Railway Historic District, is split between Akron and other parts of the county, and is thus included on both lists.

This National Park Service list is complete through NPS recent listings posted August 28, 2026.

== Current listings ==
	Name on the Register	Image	Date listed	Location	Description
1	Akron Beacon Journal Building	Akron Beacon Journal Building	December 2, 2021 (#100007190)	44 East Exchange St. 41°04′33″N 81°31′12″W	
2	Akron Jewish Center	Akron Jewish Center	July 24, 1986 (#86001919)	220 S. Balch St. 41°05′11″N 81°32′04″W	
3	Akron Post Office and Federal Building	Akron Post Office and Federal Building	May 26, 1983 (#83002059)	168 E. Market St. 41°05′00″N 81°30′49″W	
4	Akron Public Library	Akron Public Library	January 19, 1983 (#83002060)	69 E. Market St. 41°05′06″N 81°30′50″W	
5	Akron Rural Cemetery Buildings	Akron Rural Cemetery Buildings	September 27, 1980 (#80003236)	150 Glendale Ave. 41°05′05″N 81°31′32″W	
6	Akron Soap Company	Akron Soap Company	September 29, 2014 (#14000811)	237-243 Furnace St. 41°05′20″N 81°30′26″W	
7	Akron Temple Israel Synagogue		June 27, 2024 (#100010462)	133 Merriman Road; 41°05′48″N 81°32′13″W	
8	Akron Y.M.C.A. Building	Akron Y.M.C.A. Building	October 31, 1980 (#80003237)	80 W. Center St. 41°04′49″N 81°31′24″W	
9	Akron-Fulton International Airport Administration Building	Akron-Fulton International Airport Administration Building	December 21, 2001 (#01001361)	1800 Triplett Boulevard; 41°02′31″N 81°27′47″W	
10	B.F. Goodrich Company Historic District		December 21, 2020 (#100005529)	520-540 South Main Street; 115-123 West Bartges Street; 41°04′15″N 81°31′35″W	
11	Byron R. Barder House	Byron R. Barder House	September 17, 1987 (#87001598)	1041 W. Market St. 41°06′01″N 81°33′00″W	
12	Stacy G. Carkhuff House	Stacy G. Carkhuff House	August 30, 1984 (#84003804)	1225 W. Market St. 41°06′11″N 81°33′15″W	
13	Cascade Locks Historic District	Cascade Locks Historic District	December 10, 1992 (#92001627)	Roughly bounded by North, Howard, Innerbelt State Route 59, and the canal from Locks 10 to 16, including discontiguous parts north 41°05′35″N 81°31′16″W	
14	Cole Avenue Housing Project Historic District	Cole Avenue Housing Project Historic District	October 17, 2007 (#07001090)	744 Colette Dr. 41°03′05″N 81°30′07″W	
15	Eagles Temple	Eagles Temple	June 1, 1982 (#82003656)	131-137 E. Market St. 41°05′03″N 81°30′48″W	
16	East Market Street Church of Christ	East Market Street Church of Christ	February 7, 1989 (#88003440)	864 E. Market St. 41°04′22″N 81°29′30″W	
17	Firestone Tire and Rubber Company	Firestone Tire and Rubber Company	June 20, 2014 (#14000338)	1200 Firestone Parkway; 41°03′06″N 81°31′50″W	
18	First Congregational Church	First Congregational Church	February 20, 2004 (#04000061)	292 E. Market St. 41°04′53″N 81°30′31″W	
19	First National Bank Tower	First National Bank Tower	June 27, 2007 (#07000633)	106 S. Main St. 41°04′56″N 81°31′08″W	now the Huntington Tower
20	Jacob M. Gayer House	Jacob M. Gayer House	October 18, 1984 (#84003442)	406 Sumner St. 41°04′19″N 81°30′53″W	
21	Glendale Cemetery	Glendale Cemetery	September 28, 2001 (#01001063)	150 Glendale Ave. 41°05′02″N 81°31′44″W	
22	Glendale Steps	Glendale Steps	September 28, 2001 (#100009237)	65-99 Glendale Ave. 41°05′08″N 81°31′24″W	
23	Goodyear Airdock	Goodyear Airdock	April 11, 1973 (#73002259)	Southern side of the Akron Airport; 41°01′55″N 81°28′15″W	
24	Goodyear Hall-Ohio Savings and Trust Company	Goodyear Hall-Ohio Savings and Trust Company	February 24, 2014 (#14000030)	1201 E. Market St. 41°04′00″N 81°28′58″W	
25	Goodyear Tire and Rubber Company Headquarters	Goodyear Tire and Rubber Company Headquarters	August 27, 2013 (#13000683)	1144 E. Market St. 41°03′56″N 81°28′58″W	
26	The Gothic Building	The Gothic Building	May 21, 2010 (#10000280)	102 S. High St. and 52-58 E. Mill St. 41°04′55″N 81°31′01″W	
27	Grace Reformed Church	Grace Reformed Church	July 19, 1984 (#84003806)	172 W. Bowery St. 41°05′N 81°31′W	
28	Hall Park Allotment Historic District	Hall Park Allotment Historic District	October 31, 2002 (#02001274)	Roughly along Oakdale Ave., from Crestwood Ave. and Crosby St. 41°05′20″N 81°32′00″W	
29	Homeier-Universal Motor Company Building		July 15, 2025 (#100012019)	816 E. Market Street; 41°04′26″N 81°29′34″W	
30	Hower Mansion	Hower Mansion	April 11, 1973 (#73001536)	60 Fir Hill; 41°04′46″N 81°30′28″W	
31	Andrew Jackson House	Andrew Jackson House	February 13, 1975 (#75001537)	277 E. Mill St. 41°04′48″N 81°30′34″W	
32	Kenmore Boulevard Historic District		September 6, 2019 (#100004354)	Roughly bounded by 872-1030; 873-1017 Kenmore Blvd.; 2181 14th St. SW; 2200 15th St. SW; 940 Florida Ave. 41°02′34″N 81°33′37″W	
33	Loew's Theatre	Loew's Theatre	July 16, 1973 (#73001537)	182 S. Main St. 41°04′51″N 81°31′13″W	
34	Main Exchange Historic District	Main Exchange Historic District	November 12, 2009 (#09000912)	1 W. Exchange St., 323-337 S. Main St., 12 E. Exchange St., 380-348 S. Main St., and 328-326 S. Main St. 41°04′36″N 81°31′20″W	
35	Main-Market Historic District	Main-Market Historic District	August 1, 2003 (#03000719)	15-47 N. Main St., 1-39 S. Main St., 39-168 E. Market St., 18-42 N. High St., and 70 Broadway St. 41°05′06″N 81°30′59″W	
36	Edwin H. Merrill House	Edwin H. Merrill House	July 12, 2024 (#100010492)	32 Fir Hill; 41°04′50″N 81°30′27″W	
37	Wells E. Merriman House	Wells E. Merriman House	September 29, 1983 (#83002061)	641 W. Market St. 41°05′40″N 81°32′16″W	
38	Lewis Miller House	Lewis Miller House	January 30, 1976 (#76001531)	142 King Dr. 41°05′04″N 81°31′23″W	
39	O'Neil's Department Store	O'Neil's Department Store	November 28, 1990 (#90001776)	226-250 S. Main St. 41°04′46″N 81°31′24″W	
40	Old Akron Post Office	Old Akron Post Office	June 19, 1972 (#72001046)	70 E. Market St. 41°05′04″N 81°30′55″W	
41	Col. Simon Perkins Mansion	Col. Simon Perkins Mansion	August 13, 1974 (#74001624)	550 Copley Rd. 41°05′06″N 81°32′31″W	
42	Portage Hotel		October 17, 1988 (#80004611)	10 N. Main St. 41°05′08″N 81°31′01″W	Demolished in 1992
43	Quaker Oats Cereal Factory	Quaker Oats Cereal Factory	December 8, 1978 (#78002195)	120 E. Mill St. 41°04′50″N 81°30′56″W	
44	The Rhodes and Watters Apartment Buildings	The Rhodes and Watters Apartment Buildings	December 20, 2007 (#07001296)	614, 608, 610, and 612 W. Market St., and 16 Rhodes Ave. 41°05′37″N 81°32′14″W	
45	Byron W. Robinson House	Byron W. Robinson House	September 20, 1991 (#91001415)	715 E. Buchtel Ave. 41°04′37″N 81°29′43″W	
46	A. Schrader's Son, Inc. of Ohio Buildings		February 5, 2021 (#100006104)	705-711 Johnston St. 41°03′55″N 81°30′11″W	
47	Charles Willard Seiberling House	Charles Willard Seiberling House	May 6, 1993 (#93000405)	1075 W. Market St. 41°06′06″N 81°33′05″W	
48	Selle Gear Company	Selle Gear Company	November 9, 2005 (#05001213)	451 S. High St. 41°04′25″N 81°31′20″W	
49	Dr. Louis Sisler House		June 7, 2019 (#100004056)	675 N. Portage Path; 41°06′58″N 81°32′49″W	
50	Dr. Robert Smith House	Dr. Robert Smith House	October 31, 1985 (#85003411)	855 Ardmore Ave. 41°05′45″N 81°32′58″W	Designated a National Historic Landmark on October 16, 2012
51	South Main Street Historic District	South Main Street Historic District	July 2, 2008 (#08000622)	156-222 S. Main St., 153-279 S. Main St. 41°04′46″N 81°31′12″W	
52	St. Bernard's Church	St. Bernard's Church	March 9, 1989 (#89000174)	240 S. Broadway St. 41°04′41″N 81°31′07″W	
53	St. Paul's Sunday School and Parish House	St. Paul's Sunday School and Parish House	November 7, 1976 (#76001532)	E. Market and Forge Sts. 41°04′51″N 81°30′25″W	
54	Stan Hywet Hall-Frank A. Seiberling House	Stan Hywet Hall-Frank A. Seiberling House	January 17, 1975 (#75002058)	714 N. Portage Path; 41°07′07″N 81°33′05″W	
55	Stan Hywet Poultry Keepers Cottage	Stan Hywet Poultry Keepers Cottage	January 14, 2013 (#12001183)	1103 Courtleigh Dr. 41°07′06″N 81°33′12″W	
56	Summit County Courthouse and Annex	Summit County Courthouse and Annex	October 15, 1974 (#74001625)	209 S. High St. 41°04′46″N 81°31′02″W	
57	University Club		December 2, 2019 (#100004706)	105 Fir Hill; 41°04′42″N 81°30′24″W	
58	Valley Railway Historic District	Valley Railway Historic District	May 17, 1985 (#85001123)	Cuyahoga Valley between Rockside Rd. in the Cuyahoga Valley National Park and Howard St. at Little Cuyahoga Valley; 41°13′38″N 81°34′13″W	Extends into other parts of Summit County and into Cuyahoga County
59	Viall Lodge	Viall Lodge	March 17, 1994 (#94000238)	1135 E. Market St. 41°04′05″N 81°29′04″W	
60	Werner Company Building	Werner Company Building	December 12, 1976 (#76001533)	109 N. Union; 41°05′03″N 81°30′21″W	Demolished
61	Edward P. Werner House	Edward P. Werner House	October 4, 2005 (#05001146)	258 W. Market St. 41°05′20″N 81°31′34″W	
62	Wesley Temple AME Zion Church	Wesley Temple AME Zion Church	March 17, 1994 (#94000243)	104 N. Prospect St. 41°05′10″N 81°30′38″W	
63	Westmont Building	Westmont Building	May 31, 1984 (#84003807)	22 Rhodes Ave. 41°05′35″N 81°32′15″W	
64	Young Women's Christian Association	Young Women's Christian Association	November 4, 1982 (#82001491)	146 S. High St. 41°04′52″N 81°31′03″W	

== See also ==
- List of National Historic Landmarks in Ohio
- National Register of Historic Places listings in Ohio
