= List of Art Deco architecture in Ohio =

This is a list of buildings that are examples of the Art Deco architectural style in Ohio, United States.

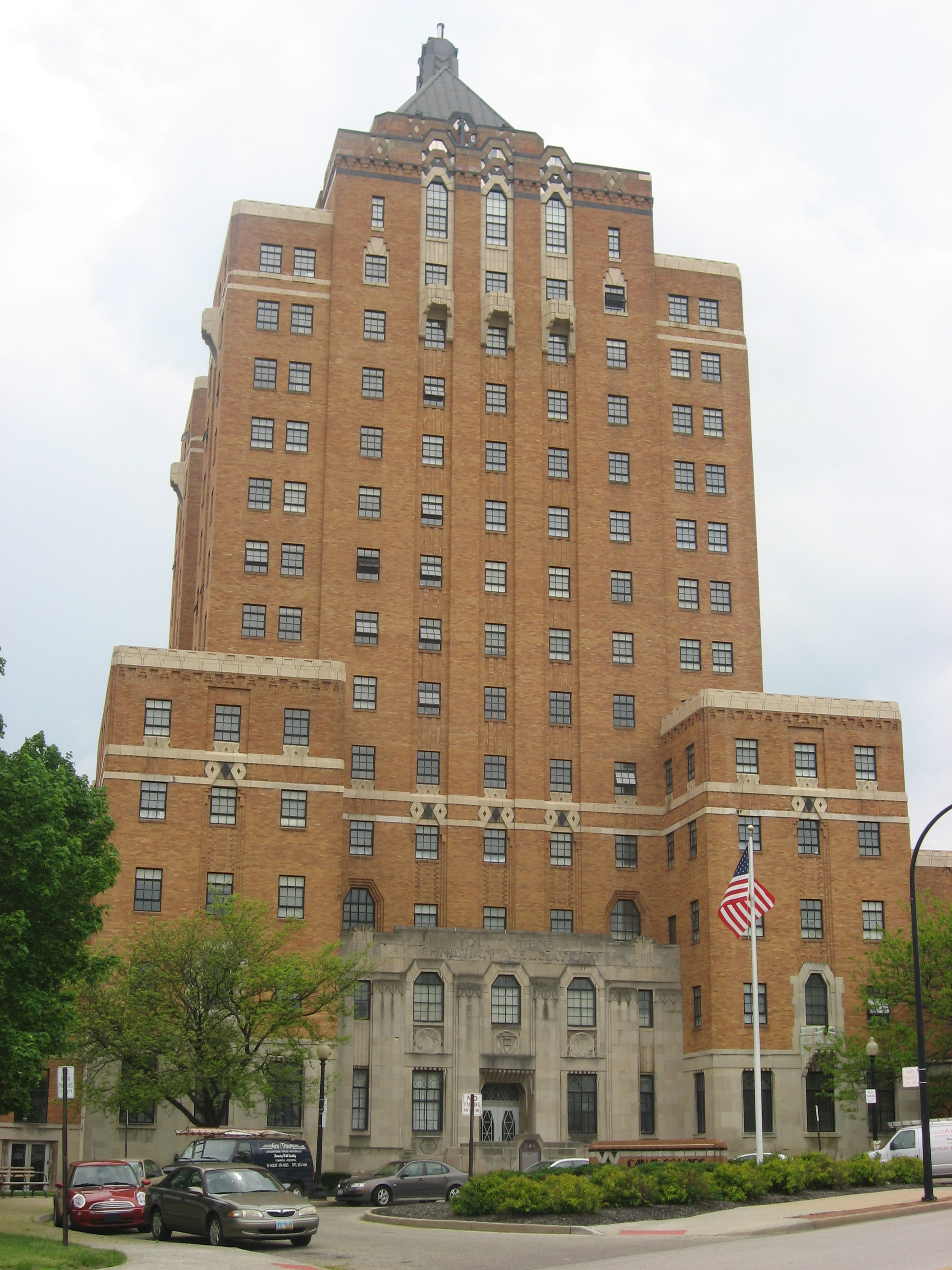
Akron YMCA Building, Akron

== Akron ==
- Akron Fulton International Airport Administration Building, Akron, 1930
- Akron YMCA Building, Akron, 1931
- Civic Theatre, Akron, 1929
- Eagles Temple, Akron, 1917
- First National Bank Tower, Akron, 1931
- Guggenheim Airship Institute, Akron, 1929
- Highland Theatre, Akron, 1938
- Huntington Tower, Akron, 1931
- Linda Theatre, Akron, 1948
- North High School, Akron, 1917
- Quaker Square, Akron, 1932

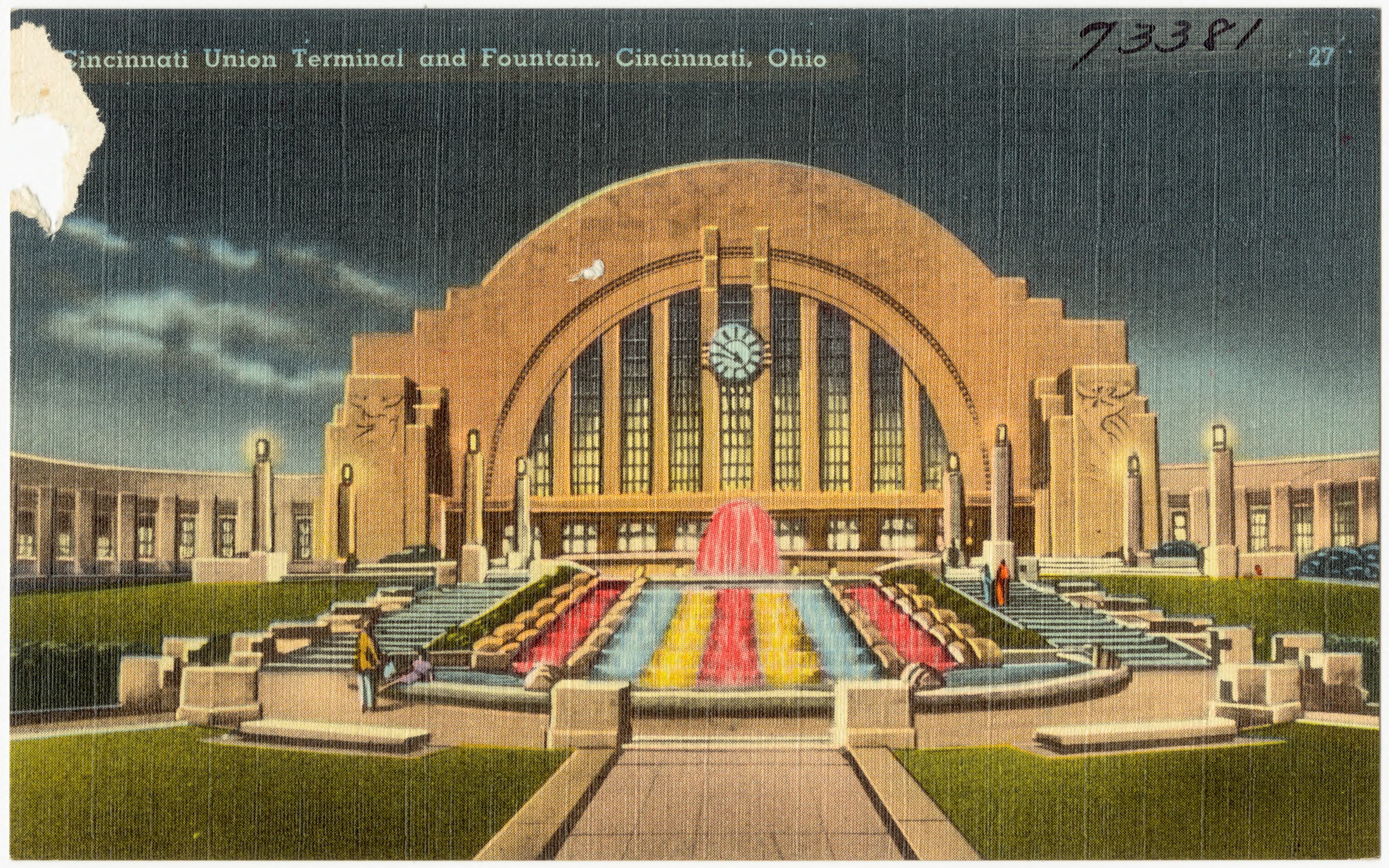
Cincinnati Union Terminal, Cincinnati

== Cincinnati ==
- Carew Tower, Cincinnati, 1930
- Cincinnati American Building, Cincinnati, 1928
- Cincinnati and Suburban Telephone Company Building, Cincinnati, 1931
- Cincinnati Enquirer Building, Cincinnati, 1926
- Cincinnati Municipal Lunken Airport, Cincinnati, 1925
- Cincinnati Times-Star Building, Cincinnati, 1933
- Cincinnati Union Terminal, Cincinnati 1933
- Coca-Cola Bottling Plant, Cincinnati, 1938
- Crosley Building, Cincinnati, 1929
- Dalton Street Post Office, Cincinnati, 1932
- Dixie Terminal, Cincinnati, 1921
- Esquire Theatre, Cincinnati, 1911 and 1939
- Ida Street Viaduct, Cincinnati, 1931
- John Shillito & Co., Cincinnati, 1878 and 1937
- Klosterman Baking Company, Cincinnati, 1880 and 1930s
- Main Post Office, Cincinnati, 1920s
- Olympic Garage, Cincinnati
- Paramount Building (former RKO Paramount Theater), Walnut Hills, Cincinnati, 1928
- Potter Stewart United States Courthouse, Cincinnati, 1938
- Price Hill Historical Society Museum (former Provident Bank), Price Hill, Cincinnati
- Rookwood Ice Cream Parlor, Cincinnati, 1933
- S. Gayle and Agnes P. Lowrie House, Cincinnati
- Taft Theatre, Cincinnati, 1928
- Twentieth Century Theatre, Cincinnati, 1941
- Western Hills Viaduct, Western Hills, Cincinnati

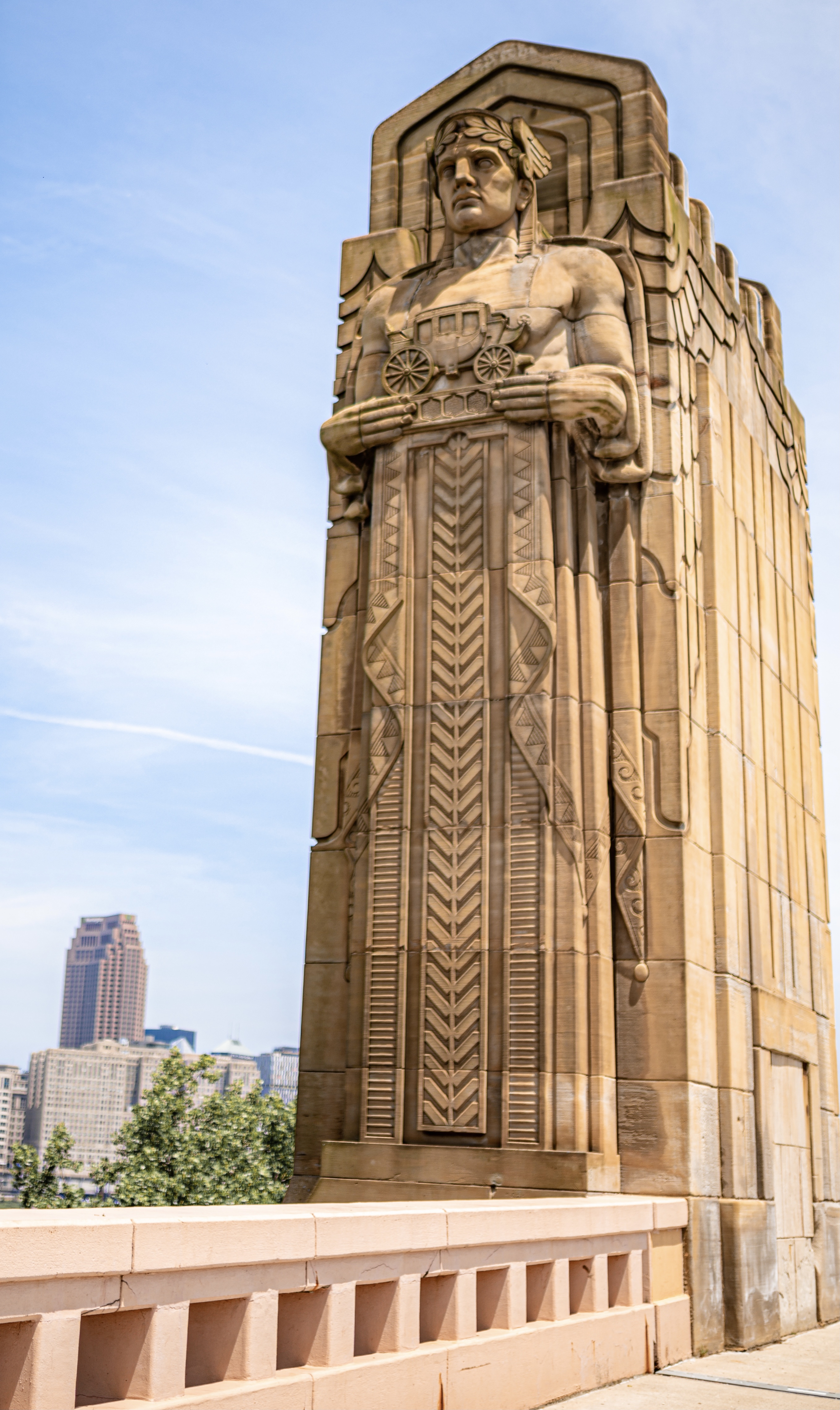
"Guardian of Traffic", Hope Memorial Bridge, Cleveland

== Cleveland ==
- AT&T Huron Road Building, Cleveland, 1927
- Cleveland Arcade, Cleveland, 1890 and 1939
- Cleveland Stadium, Cleveland, 1931
- Embassy Theater, Cleveland, 1938
- Fenn Tower, Cleveland, 1937
- First Catholic Slovak Union, Cleveland
- Greyhound Bus Station, Cleveland, 1948
- Hope Memorial Bridge, Cleveland, 1932
- Landmark Office Towers Complex, Cleveland, 1930
- Lerner Building, Cleveland
- Ohio Bell Henderson-Endicott Exchange Building, Cleveland, 1928
- Ohio Theatre, Cleveland, 1921
- Outhwaite Homes, Cleveland, 1935
- Sears, Roebuck & Company Building, Cleveland.
- Severance Hall, Cleveland, 1931
- Shaker Square Cinemas, Cleveland
- Terminal Tower, Cleveland, 1930
- Tower City Center, Cleveland, 1927
- Whiskey Island Coast Guard Station, Whiskey Island, Cleveland, 1940

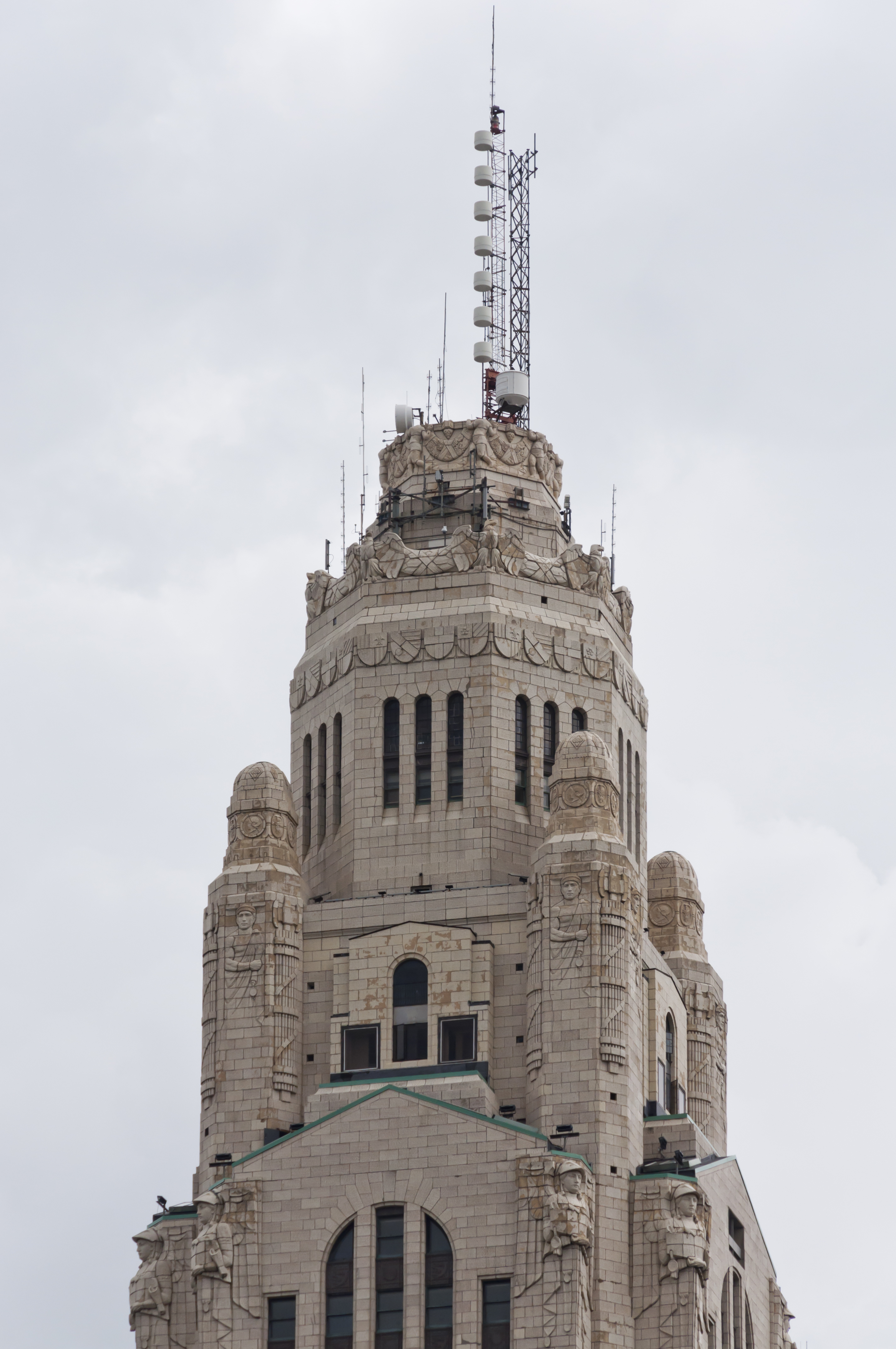
LeVeque Tower, Columbus

== Columbus ==
- American Education Press Building, 1932
- American Education Press Building, 1936
- Beggs Building, 1928
- Central Assurance Company, 1942
- Farm Crest Bakeries Building, 1949
- F. W. Woolworth Store, 1937
- Jaeger Machine Company Office Building, 1936
- Law and Finance Building, 1927
- LeVeque Tower, 1927
- Lincoln Theatre, 1928
- Municipal Light Plant, 1937 and 1950s
- Ohio Judicial Center, 1931
- Old Port Columbus Airport Terminal and Control Tower, 1929
- Palace Theatre, 1927
- Royal York Apartments, 1937

== Dayton ==
- America's Packard Museum, Dayton, 1917
- Dayton Gym Club, Dayton, 1952
- Leslie L. Diehl Bandshell, Dayton, 1940
- Liberty Tower, Dayton, 1931
- White Tower Hamburger, Dayton, 1941
- Wympee Burger, Dayton, 1938

== Mariemont ==
- Cincinnati Steel Treating Company, Mariemont Historic District, Mariemont 1928
- Kellogg's Building, Mariemont Historic District, Mariemont, 1920s–1930s
- Packaging Microfactory (former Haney PRC Building), Mariemont Historic District, Mariemont, 1940

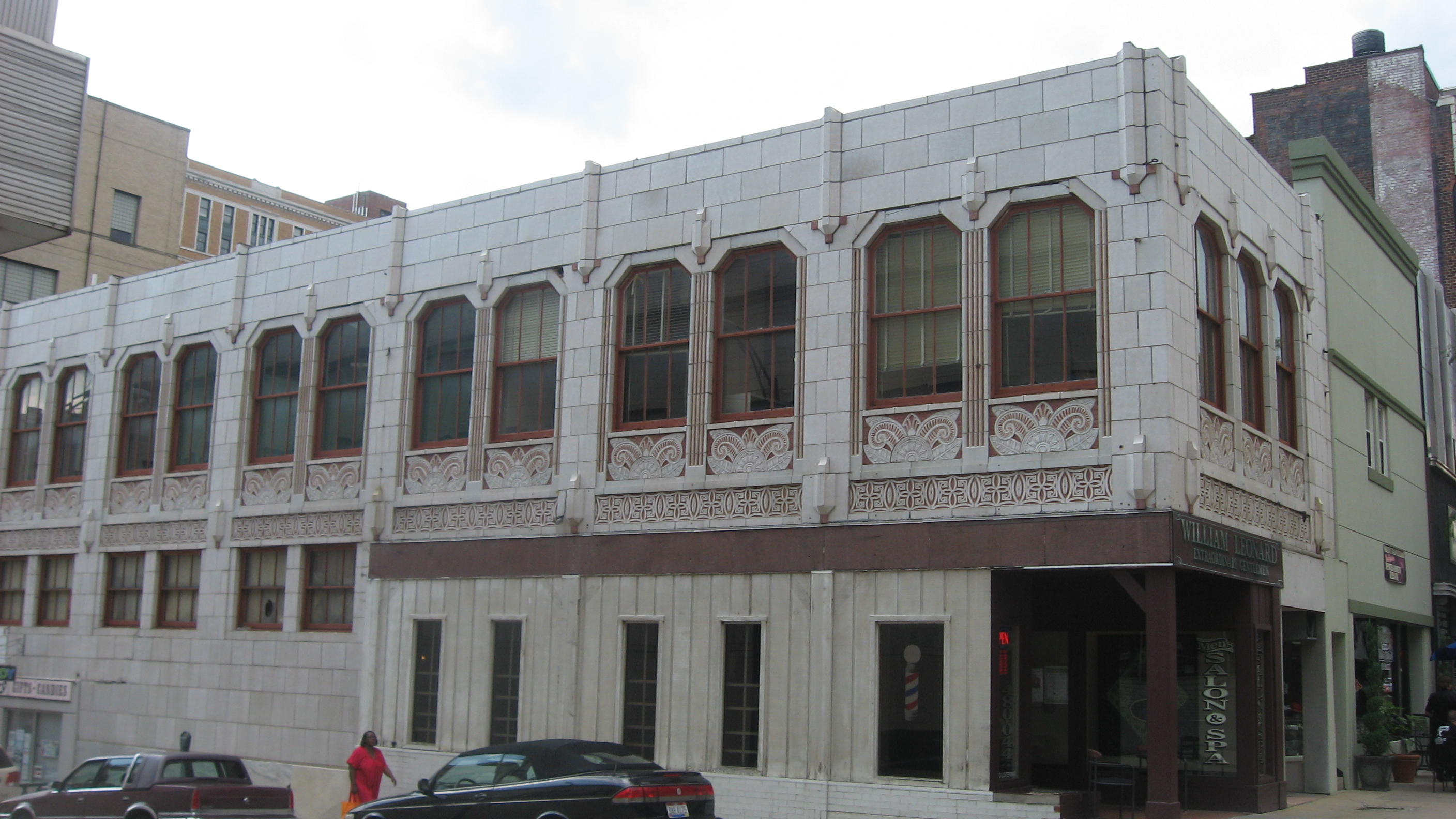
Peggy Ann Building, Youngstown

== Youngstown ==
- Baker's Shoes Building, Youngstown
- Burt Building (now Vindicator Building), Youngstown, 1930
- Isaly Dairy Plant (now U-Haul), Youngstown, 1930s
- Metropolitan Tower, Youngstown, 1929
- Peggy Ann Building (now Whistle & Keg), Youngstown, 1930
- Powers Auditorium, Youngstown, 1930
- S. H. Kress and Co. Building, Youngstown, 1925

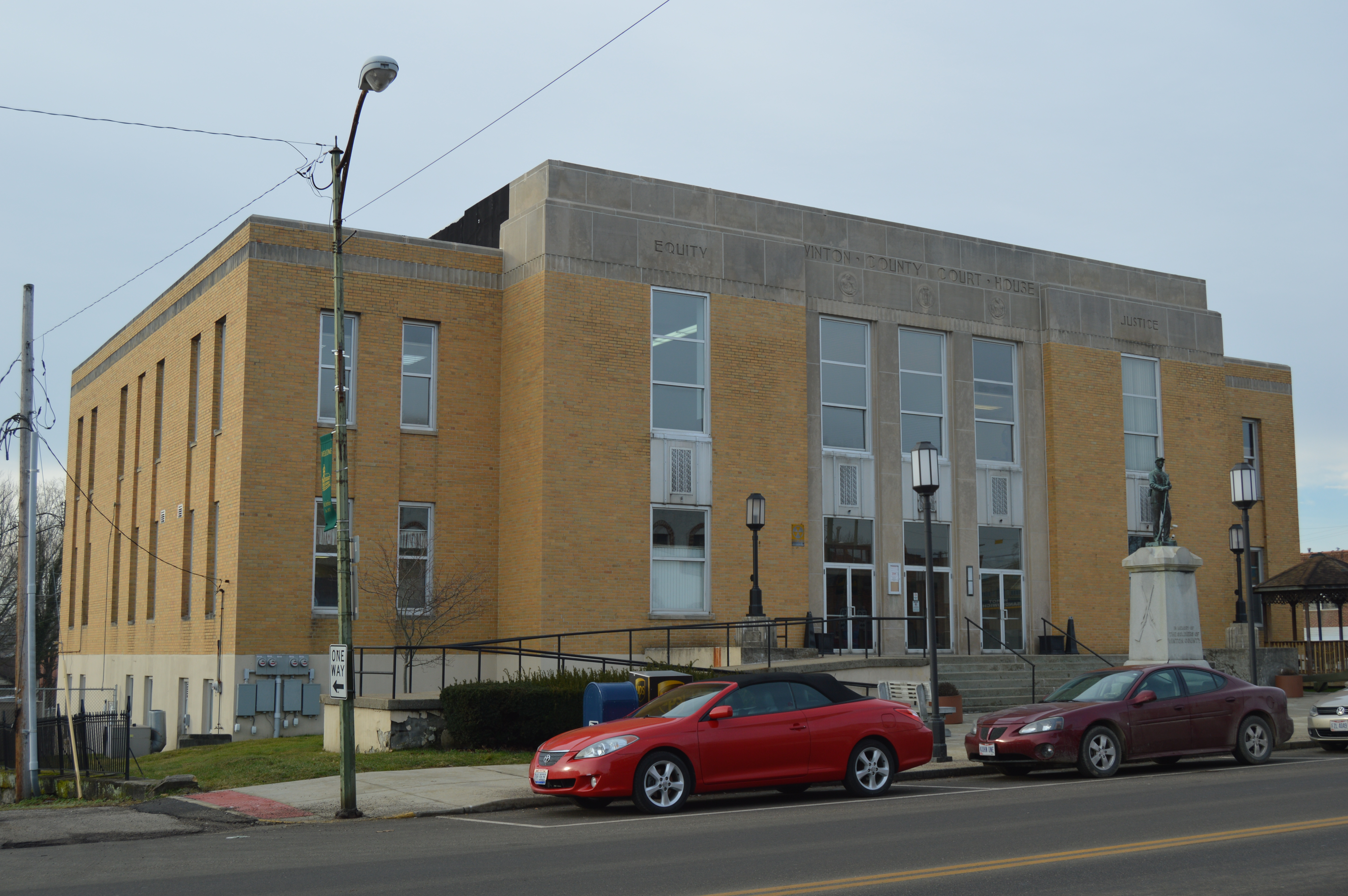
Vinton County Courthouse, McArthur

== Other cities ==
- Ada Theatre, Ada, 1938
- Armco Research Building, Middletown, 1937
- Apollo Theatre, Oberlin, 1913
- Athena Cinema, Athens, 1915 and 1935
- Butler Township Hall, Butler Township, 1927
- Chase Tower, Mansfield
- Cheviot Field House and Community Center, Cheviot, 1936
- City Hall, East Liverpool, 1934
- Community Building, South Solon, 1938
- Donnell Building (Marathon Petroleum Headquarters), Findlay, 1929 and 1941
- Drexel Theatre, Bexley, late 1930s
- Erie County Courthouse, Sandusky, 1939
- Fairborn Theatre, Fairborn, 1948
- Fire Department and Municipal Building, Sidney, 1939
- Firestone, Toledo, 1920s
- Grafton School, Grafton, 1936
- Green Township High School, Smithville, 1936 and 1943
- The Hangar, Beachwood, 1930
- Huron High School, Huron, 1943 and 1952
- Italian American Beneficial Club Building, Sandusky, 1941
- Kerr Beverage Co., Lorain
- Kirby Flowers & Gifts, Portsmouth, 1938
- Lake 8 Movies Theatre, Barberton, 1938
- Lake Theatre, Barberton, 1938
- Mason Municipal Building, Mason
- Maumee Indoor Theatre, Maumee, 1946
- National City Bank Building, Toledo, 1930
- New Cleveland School (now a community center), Ottawa
- The Norwalk Theatre, Norwalk (1941)
- Ohio Power Company Building, Zanesville, 1929
- Police Station, Euclid
- Portsmouth City Hall, Portsmouth, 1935
- Quaker Cinema, New Philadelphia, 1940
- Richland Trust Building, Mansfield, 1929
- Silk City Diner#4655, Sabina, 1946
- Sparta Grille & Newark Coin Exchange, Newark, 1930s
- Springfield Main Post Office, Springfield, 1934
- Telephone Building, Newark, 1920s
- United States Post Office, Delphos
- Vinton County Courthouse, McArthur, 1939
- Voice of America Bethany Relay Station, Union Township, 1944
- W. T. Grant Building, Steubenville, 1920s

== See also ==
- List of Art Deco architecture
- List of Art Deco architecture in the United States
