= List of United States post offices in Ohio =

United States post offices operate under the authority of the United States Post Office Department (1792–1971) or the United States Postal Service (since 1971). Historically, post offices were usually placed in a prominent location. Many were architecturally distinctive, including notable buildings featuring Beaux-Arts, Art Deco, and Vernacular architecture. However, modern U.S. post offices were generally designed for functionality rather than architectural style.

Following is a list of United States post offices in Ohio. Notable post offices include individual buildings, whether still in service or not, which have architectural, historical, or community-related significance. Many of these are listed on the National Register of Historic Places (NRHP) or state and local historic registers.

Post office	City	Date built	Image	Architect	Notes	Ref.
Akron Post Office and Federal Building	Akron	1927–1929			(Note: Listed on the National Register of Historic Places)	
Old Akron Post Office, now Akron Art Museum	Akron	1895		unknown	(Note: No longer used as a post office.) (Note: Contributing structure to the Main-Market Historic District.)	
Ashtabula Post Office and Federal Building	Ashtabula	1910		James Knox Taylor		
United States Post Office (Bowling Green, Ohio)	Bowling Green	1913		James Knox Taylor, Oscar Wenderoth		
Chardon Post Office Building	Chardon	1940			(Note: Originally housed the New Deal mural Maple Sugar Camp by George A. Picken, later moved to the Chardon Municipal Center.)	
U.S. Post Office (Chesterville, Ohio)	Chesterville	c. 1850		unknown		
Old College Hill Post Office	Cincinnati	1840		unknown		
Potter Stewart United States Post Office and Courthouse	Cincinnati	1936–1938		Louis A. Simon		
Old Federal Building and Post Office, now the Howard M. Metzenbaum United States Courthouse	Cleveland	1910		Arnold W. Brunner, James Knox Taylor		
Franklinton Post Office	Columbus	1807		David Deardurff		
United States Post Office and Courthouse (Columbus, Ohio)	Columbus	1884–1887, 1912		John T. Harris, James Knox Taylor		
United States Post Office and Courthouse, now Joseph P. Kinneary United States Courthouse	Columbus	1934		Richards, McCarty & Bulford; James A. Wetmore		
Old Post Office and Federal Building (Dayton, Ohio)	Dayton	1915		James Knox Taylor		
Delaware Post Office	Delaware	1911		James A. Wetmore, James Knox Taylor		
East Liverpool Post Office	East Liverpool	1908		unknown		
U.S. Post Office (Elyria, Ohio)	Elyria	1915		James A. Wetmore		
Franklin Post Office	Franklin	1802		unknown		
United States Post Office (Lima, Ohio)	Lima	1930		James A. Wetmore	(Note: Contributing structure to the Lima Multiple Resource Area.)	
U.S. Post Office (Lorain, Ohio)	Lorain	1913–1914		Oscar Wenderoth		
Old U.S. Post Office (Marion, Ohio)	Marion	1910		James Knox Taylor		
Old Post Office And Federal Building (Medina, Ohio)	Medina	1915		James Knox Taylor		
U.S. Post Office (Sandusky, Ohio), now Merry-Go-Round Museum	Sandusky	1927				
Old Central Post Office	Toledo	1911		James Knox Taylor		
Mill Office and Post Office	Woodsdale	1868				
United States Post Office and Federal Building (Zanesville, Ohio)	Zanesville	1904		George F. Hammond		
