= Grace Reformed Church =

Grace Reformed Church may refer to:

== United States ==
On the National Register of Historic Places

- Grace Reformed Church (Newton, North Carolina)
- Grace Reformed Church (Akron, Ohio)
- Grace Reformed Church (Washington, D.C.)
