= Akron Jewish Center =

Former synagogue and church, now community center in Akron, Ohio, US

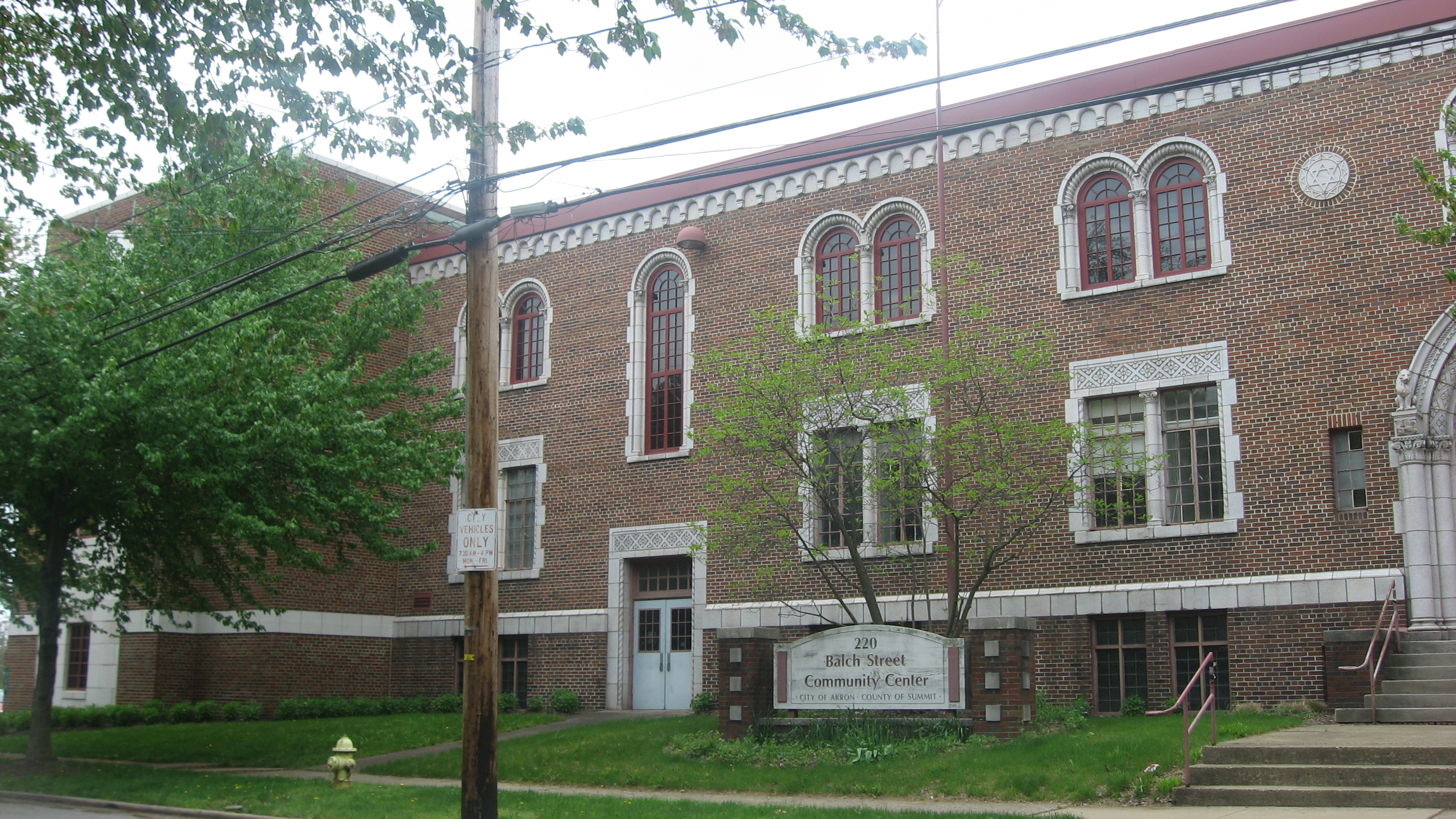
- The former synagogue, now community center, in 2013

- Location in Ohio

Religion
- Affiliation: Judaism (former); Baptists (former)
- Ecclesiastical or organizational status: Synagogue (1929–1973); Church (1973–1985); Community center (since c. 1985)
- Ownership: City of Akron

Location
- Location: 220 South Balch Street, Akron, Ohio
- Country: United States
- Interactive map of Akron Jewish Center
- Coordinates: 41°5′12″N 81°32′3″W

Architecture
- Architects: Fichter & Brooker (1929); Michael M. Konarski (1951)
- Type: Synagogue architecture
- Style: Romanesque Revival; Byzantine Revival; Art Deco
- Established: 1924 (as a Jewish congregation)
- Completed: 1929; 1951
- Akron Jewish Center
- U.S. National Register of Historic Places
- NRHP reference No.: 86001919
- Added to NRHP: July 24, 1986

The Akron Jewish Center is a historic building in Akron, Ohio, in the United States. It was built in 1929 and expanded in 1951 as a synagogue, Jewish community center, and headquarters for the organization with the same name for over 45 years. The building was subsequently used as a church and, since 1985, as a community center operated by the local city authorities.

The building was listed on the National Register of Historic Places in 1986.

== Description ==
The address of the center is 220 S. Balch Street. Designed by architectural firm Fichter & Brooker in a free Romanesque Revival style the details display Byzantine Revival influences. Built in 1929 the two and a half story masonry building is constructed of red brick in American bond pattern. Exterior trim is faux granite terra-cotta, with the raised basement demarcated by a prominent terra-cotta water table. The main entrance is raised six steps above ground level. Exterior walls rise to a parapet with a frieze that creates the effect of corbelling and a low profile ornamented cornice. The parapet conceals a flat roof.

On the long side of this basically rectangular structure the grandly ornamented main entrance is set off center. An archway featuring multiple archivolts resting on a boss that is a stylized old testament [sic] (see Torah) figure in turn resting on biblical [sic] lions (see Lion of Judah). The entire arch is supported by multiple engaged columns in groups set at 90 degrees from each other. Four multiple light doors with the center two paired are topped by wide cross beam bearing the words, "Akron Jewish Center" supporting a fully glazed tympanum. A smaller doorway on the left leading directly to the athletic facilities has a deep transom and ornamented lintel.

Further to the left is a large addition constructed in 1951. This addition was designed by Michael M. Konarski in a congruent Art Deco style with interpretations of Byzantine influences evident in the terra-cotta detailing. Matching brick was used for this addition. A notable feature of the interior is a multipurpose auditorium with balconies and a full proscenium stage. The seating capacity in stage configuration is 1,000. Extensive athletic facilities with equipment and a wide variety of recreational and social purposed rooms are complemented by office and civic spaces. The low profile building fits quietly in a neighborhood that remains residential.

== Jewish community center ==
The Akron Jewish Center is also the name of the organization for whom this building was headquarters for over forty-five years. The charter to establish the Akron Jewish Center was secured by a group of prominent local Jewish men who organized for that purpose in 1924. As a Jewish community center the organization and the facility served a deep variety of religious and secular purposes.

A synagogue and all associated functions were just the beginning of the activities of the center. The health of the community was advanced physically, socially, intellectually, spiritually and in civic discourse. The organization was very active in the community at large as well as within the Jewish community of Akron. In addition to the full complement of religious and Jewish cultural programming, concerts, theatrical performances and a civic speaker series aimed at the wider community were put on by the center.

The theatrical performances and concerts were popular and the speaker series Akron Civic Forum had developed into a television and radio program in 1986. Notable guests of the speaker series included Franklin Delano Roosevelt Jr., Eleanor Roosevelt, Robert A. Taft, Edward R. Murrow and Drew Pearson. The program America's Town Meeting of the Air broadcast from the center twice.

The property is composed of several lots including one that had been a meeting place for a local Jewish congregation. The cornerstone was laid on November 4, 1928 and the building was dedicated and opened on September 22, 1929. The building's architects were J. Adam Fitcher and Harry A. Brooker namesakes of a firm that left a notable imprint on Akron across two decades.

== Modern times ==
The Akron Jewish Center organization moved out of the building in 1973, selling it to Shadyside Baptist Church which occupied it until 1985. Today the building is owned by the City of Akron, which uses it as a community center.

The property was listed in the United States National Register of Historic Places on July 24, 1986.

== See also ==
- History of the Jews in Ohio
- National Register of Historic Places listings in Akron, Ohio
