= Akron Fulton International Airport =

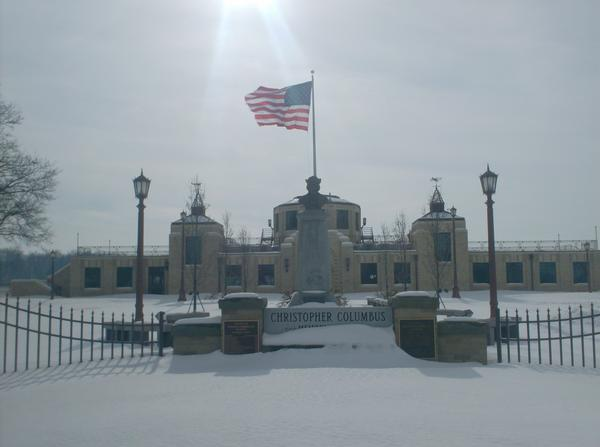
- IATA: AKC; ICAO: KAKR; FAA LID: AKR

Summary
- Airport type: Public
- Owner: City of Akron
- Serves: Akron, Ohio
- Time zone: UTC−05:00 (-5)
  - Summer (DST): UTC−04:00 (-4)
- Elevation AMSL: 1,067 ft (325 m)
- Coordinates: 41°02′15″N 081°28′01″W

Maps
- FAA airport diagram
- Location within Ohio Location within the United States

Runways
Direction	Length		Surface
Direction	ft	m	Surface
7/25	6,337	1,932	Asphalt

Statistics (2022)
- Aircraft operations (year ending 9/19/2022): 48,910
- Based aircraft: 84
- Source: Federal Aviation Administration

Akron Fulton International Airport (IATA: AKC, ICAO: KAKR, FAA LID: AKR) is in Akron, Summit County, Ohio, United States. It is owned by the City of Akron; FAA's National Plan of Integrated Airport Systems for 2011–2015 called it a general aviation airport.

Most U.S. airports use the same three-letter location identifier for the FAA and IATA, but Akron Executive is AKR to the FAA and AKC to the IATA (which assigned AKR to Akure, Nigeria).

== History ==
The airport was initially named for longtime manager Bain Ecarius "Shorty" Fulton and his son Bain J. "Bud" Fulton. Funding for the airport was initially allocated in 1924, and it opened in 1929. Later it was a U.S. naval air station, Naval Air Station Akron. The airport has served only general aviation for many years, but it does technically have United States Immigration and Customs Enforcement facilities and so is considered an "international airport".

The airport is home to the Goodyear Airdock, where the first lighter-than-air ships were built. More than 130 airships and 4,000 naval FG-1D Corsair fighter aircraft were produced at the airport by Goodyear Aircraft during World War II. The airport was a Naval Air Station, designated as NAS Akron, used to train pilots during the Korean War and the Vietnam War.

From 1951 through the 1960s the airport was used as a drag racing strip, and it is also home to the All-American Soap Box Derby.

In 1985, the Akron Fulton International Airport was recognized as the 3rd National Landmark of Soaring by the National Soaring Museum.

On August 3, 2018, the City of Akron announced that the airport had been renamed Akron Executive Airport. However, the city has since reverted to using the Akron Fulton International Airport name.

In 2020, the Akron City Council approved $6 million in upgrades for the airport, including upgrades the airport's lighting system and a runway reconstruction to allow nearby land to be developed. While the airport's main runway was not altered, the smaller north/south runway was ultimately removed to allow for hangars or other developments, both in and around the airport, to be built. Much of the funding for the project was funded by the federal CARES Act due to the COVID-19 pandemic.

In 2026, the Akron Fulton International Airport would be getting $3.2 million from the FAA to upgrade its taxiways.

The Akron-Fulton International Airport Administration Building is on the National Register of Historic Places.

== Historical airline service ==
The airport once had airline service on Pennsylvania Airlines, Inc. Flights went to Washington, D.C. via Pittsburgh six times daily. United Airlines once flew the Douglas DC-3 from Akron Executive to Chicago (via Cleveland) and New York.

Eastern Airlines flew to Akron Executive in 1945. Akron served as a stop on the carrier's flights from Denver to Miami. American Airlines also flew to Akron Executive around that time, connecting Akron to other Ohio cities like Cleveland, Columbus, and Dayton.

== Facilities and aircraft ==
Akron Fulton Intl Airport covers 1,171 acres (474 ha) at an elevation of 1,067 feet (325 m). It has one asphalt runway: 7/25 is 6,337 by 150 feet (1,932 x 46 m).

In the year ending September 19, 2022 the airport had 48,910 aircraft operations, an average 134 per day: 99% general aviation, <1% air taxi, and <1% military. This is up from 26,000 annual operations in 2010. At that time 84 aircraft were based at the airport: 71 single-engine and 9 multi-engine airplanes, 3 jets, and 1 helicopter.

The airport is supported by local Fixed-Base Operator (FBO) Summit Air, which fuels and hangars aircraft. North Coast Air Care has been based at the Akron Flight facility since May 2000. It services the general aviation community by performing inspections, maintenance, and repairs.

== Accidents and incidents ==
- On July 9, 1995, a homebuilt Quickie II was destroyed when it impacted the ground near the Akron-Fulton Airport. The aircraft had been working on takeoffs and landings in the airport's traffic pattern for 15 minutes. After the accident takeoff, the aircraft made a 180 to try to come back to the runway, and witnesses reported the aircraft used excessive maneuvers to try to line up for final. From a near vertical bank, the plane stalled on final. It fell straight down on the left wing and cartwheeled. The cause of the accident was found to be the pilot's improper maneuver during the turn to final approach, which resulted in an inadvertent stall/spin and collision with the terrain.
- On September 10, 1995, a Robinson R-22 Beta was destroyed when it impacted the ground after takeoff at the Akron Fulton Airport. Witnesses to the aircraft's takeoff at the nearby Akron-Canton airport said the helicopter appeared to "wobble" on departure, the engine sounded like it was revving, and the tail rotor appeared to be spinning slower than normal. The probable cause of the accident was found to be the pilot's failure to maintain control of the rotor RPM, and his improper remedial action, which resulted in the rotor stalling.
- On March 19, 2000, a Beech A23 Bonanza was destroyed when it impacted houses in a residential area shortly after takeoff from Akron Fulton International Airport. After takeoff, a witness said that the accident aircraft was "barely climbing" and that the engine noise was constant but sounded like it wasn't at full power. Another witness said he looked out his window and observed the blue and white airplane below the roof-tops and that the aircraft appeared to be "gliding in." The probable cause of the accident was found to be the pilot's improper decision to operate the airplane with known deficiencies.
- On February 12, 2015, a Piper PA-46 veered off the left side of the runway during landing at Akron Fulton Airport. The pilot applied right rudder and left aileron control inputs for the landing. After touchdown, a gust of wind lifted the left wing, resulting in a loss of directional control. The airplane veered off the left side of the runway and into a grass area adjacent to the runway where the nose landing gear collapsed. The probable cause of the accident was found to be the pilot's failure to maintain directional control during a crosswind landing in gusting crosswind conditions.
- On November 10, 2015, a Hawker 700 crashed into an Akron apartment complex shortly before 3:00pm (15:00) EST in rainy weather, near the intersection of Skelton and Mogadore Roads, while on approach to Akron Fulton International Airport. Witnesses reported hearing a loud explosion, and seeing smoke/flames as the crash occurred. All nine occupants of the aircraft, including both pilots, were killed in the crash. Akron police units were the first to report to the scene, followed shortly by firefighters and the Ohio State Highway Patrol. The National Transportation Safety Board dispatched an incident team to the site of the crash.
- On July 4, 2022, a Cessna Skyhawk Cessna 172 flying from Chambers Airport in Tunkannock, Pennsylvania to Weltzien Skypark Airport crashed while attempting an emergency landing at Akron Fulton Intl Airport about a mile Northeast of the runway in Ellet Community Center parking lot. Both pilot and passenger survived the crash. Preliminary investigations suggest the crash was due to fuel exhaustion.
- On May 14, 2026, a Piper PA-28-180 crashed into a residence during a training flight originating from the airport, killing both occupants on board. No one inside the home sustained injuries.

== See also ==
- List of airports in Ohio
