= Akron Soap Company =

American company

- U.S. National Register of Historic Places
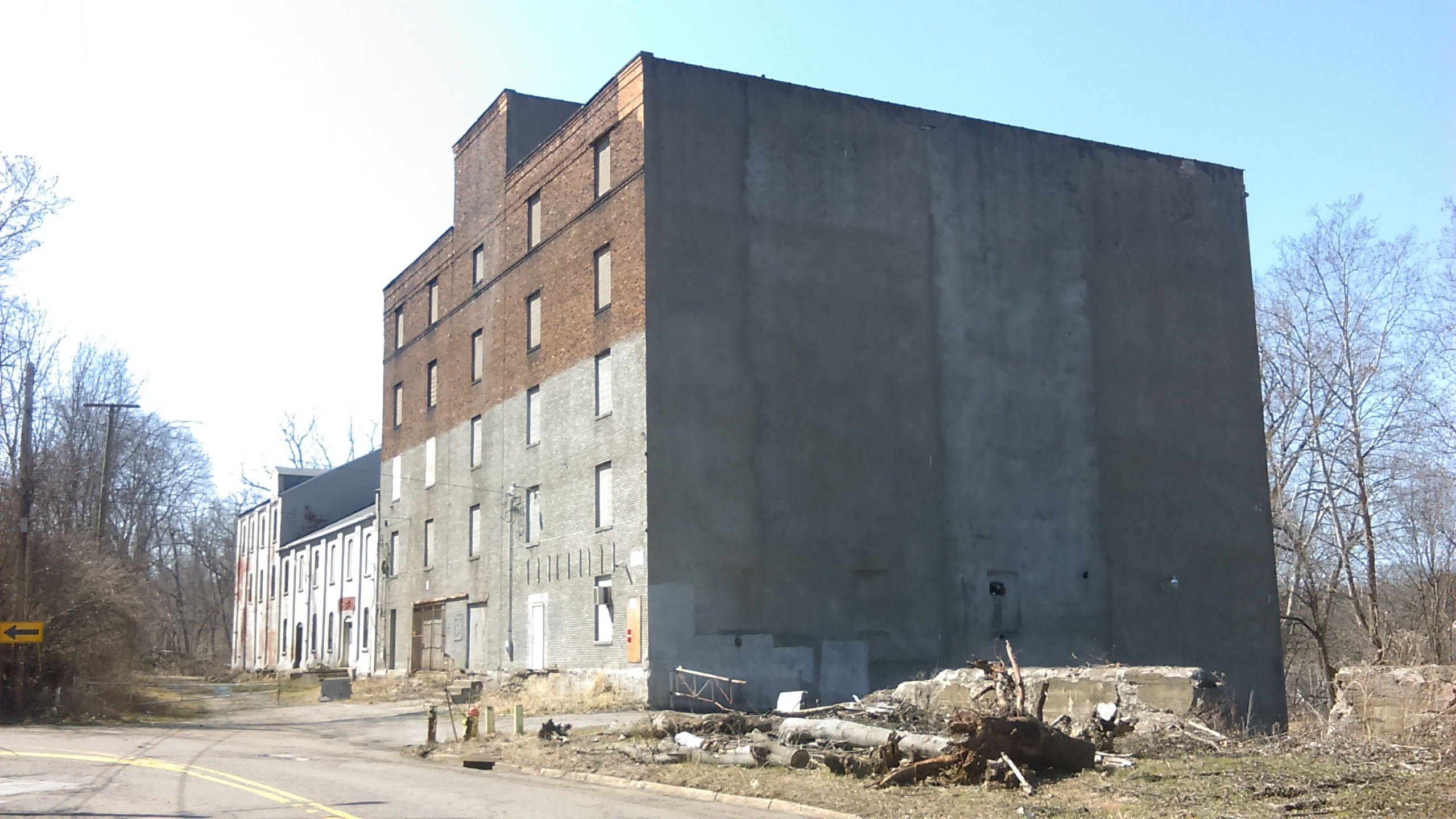
- The Akron Soap Company Building

- Location within Ohio Location within the United States
- Location: 237-243 Furnace St. Akron, Ohio
- Coordinates: 41.08699°N 81.50747°W
- Built: 1893
- Architectural style: Late Victorian/Romanesque Revival
- NRHP reference No.: 14000811

The Akron Soap Company was a late-19th and early-20th-century soap manufacturer based in Akron, Ohio. Founded by Adam Duncan in 1884, the company became one of Akron's notable early industries and played a role in the city's transition from small-scale craft production to large-scale industrial manufacturing.

== History ==
Adam Duncan, who had previously worked in his family's Cleveland soap business, established the Akron Soap Company in 1891 in the Middlebury neighborhood of Akron. By 1892 the business had expanded significantly, leading to the construction of a new three-part brick factory at Furnace and North Streets. Completed in 1893, the facility contained large rendering vats—three holding 30,000 pounds each and one holding 60,000 pounds and was capable of producing roughly 1.1 million pounds of soap per week.

The company manufactured several brands of laundry and toilet soaps, including Grand, Electric Grip, and Calla, which were distributed across Ohio, Michigan, Indiana, Pennsylvania, and New York. The enterprise received financial backing from members of the Robinson family, prominent Akron industrialists associated with the Robinson Clay Products Company.

== Relocation and later use ==
By the late 1890s, residents near the Furnace Street plant began filing complaints about odors from the rendering process. Increasing pressure from the city eventually forced the company to relocate outside Akron's limits.

The original factory's only other major industrial occupant was the Pioneer Cereal Company, which significantly expanded the site between 1908 and 1915 before declaring bankruptcy. After 1915, the property was divided among a variety of industrial users. Most Pioneer-era additions were demolished; the surviving structure is largely the original 1893 Akron Soap Company building.

In 2013 the building was converted into office space. In May 2022, Oriana House announced it was purchasing the site and converting it into 11 residential rental units for low income housing. They estimated the building rehab project would cost $14 million and received state tax credits equaling out to $3.1 million.

== Legacy ==
The Akron Soap Company contributed to the early diversification of Akron's industrial economy. The Duncan family went on to establish several other enterprises, including the Akron Abattoir Company, Duncan Oil Company, and the American Tire and Rubber Company. The company's history also reflects broader national trends in industrial expansion, urban growth, and the eventual development of modern zoning laws, as conflicts between industry and residential areas became more pronounced.

Today, the original 1893 factory remains an example of Akron's industrial heritage and the entrepreneurial networks that shaped the city's development during the late 19th century. The building was listed on the National Register of Historic Places in September 2014.
