= Werner Company Building =

- U.S. National Register of Historic Places
- Location within Ohio Location within the United States
- Location: 109 N. Union and Perkins St., Akron, Ohio
- Coordinates: 41°5′3″N 81°30′21″W
- Built: 1895
- Architect: Meade, Frank
- Architectural style: Eclectic German medieval
- NRHP reference No.: 76001533
- Added to NRHP: December 12, 1976

The Werner Company Building in Akron, Ohio was built in 1895 by Frank Meade; it was added to the National Register of Historic Places on December 12, 1976. The building, originally part of an 11-building complex, served as the office building for the Werner Printing & Lithograph Co. The company produced titles such as Encyclopedia Americana, Waldorf Cook Book, Webster's Dictionary, Encyclopædia Britannica, White House Cook Book and, Library of the World's Best Literature.

The building was demolished September 5th, 2020.
