= St. Paul's Sunday School and Parish House =

- U.S. National Register of Historic Places
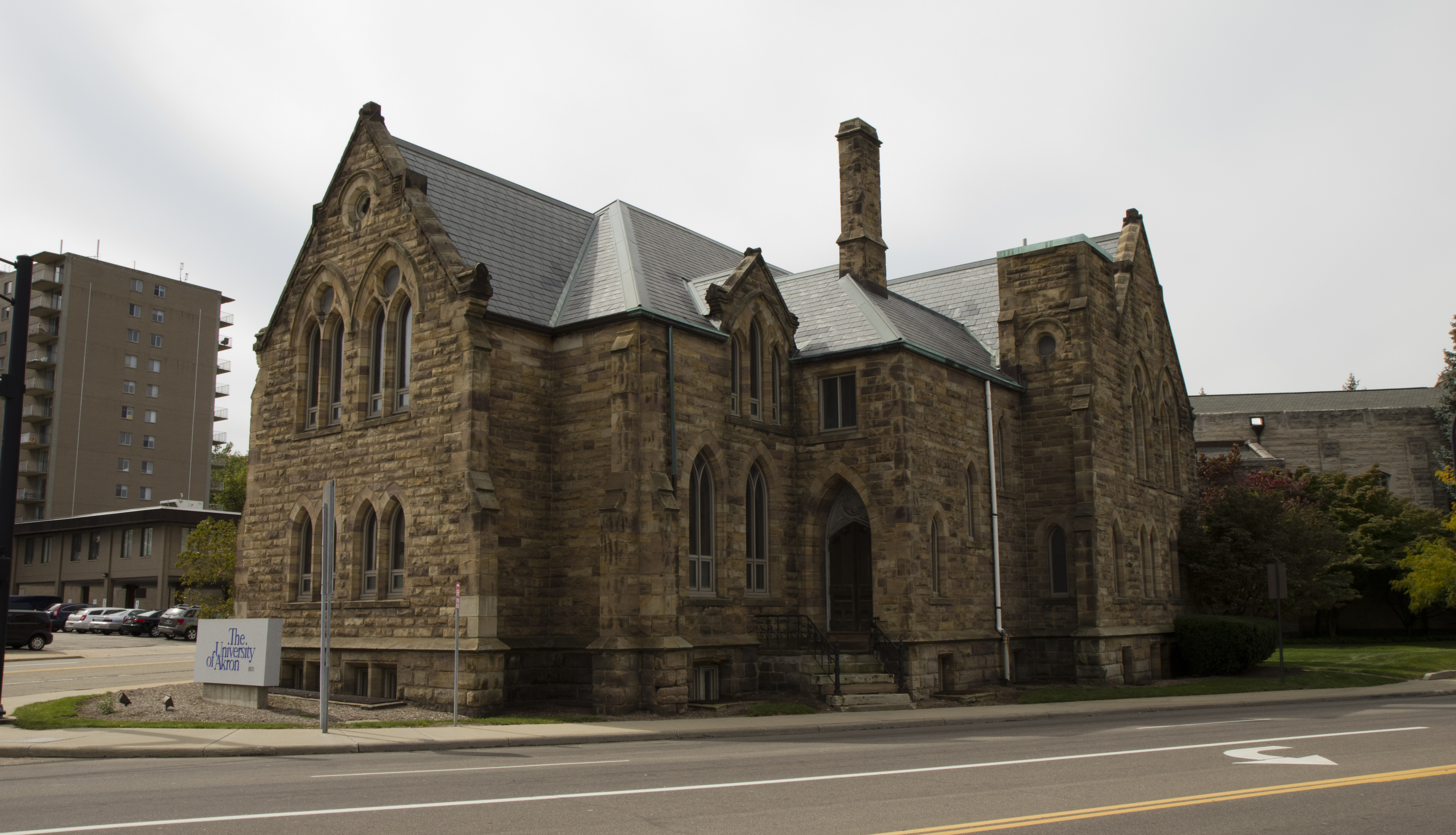
- St. Paul's Sunday School and Parish House

- Location within Ohio Location within the United States
- Location: E. Market and Forge Sts., Akron, Ohio
- Coordinates: 41°4′51″N 81°30′25″W
- Area: less than one acre
- Built: 1884
- Architectural style: Gothic
- NRHP reference No.: 76001532
- Added to NRHP: November 7, 1976

St. Paul's Sunday School and Parish House was erected at the corner of at East Market and Forge Streets in Akron, Ohio, for $35,000 in 1884-85 by the St. Paul's Episcopal Church located at 1361 West Market Street. It was built primarily to serve as a Sunday school and parish house, but also as a sanctuary. After closing its doors as a church, the building served as the Firestone Conservatory of Music at the University of Akron until the addition of Guzzetta Hall to the university's campus in 1976. It was added to the National Register of Historic Places that same year.

On April 18, 2018, a fire broke out inside St. Paul's at approximately 11:30 p.m., causing significant damage to the building. Emergency crews responding to the scene of a three alarm fire spent most of the night and part of the next day extinguishing the flames. The building, though owned by the University of Akron, had sat vacant and unused since 2006. The cause of the fire was determined to be unknown and the historic structure a loss.

On July 21, 2021 The University of Akron (Ohio) announced it had accepted a bid to purchase the property from a local developer who intends to preserve the buildings.
