= Cascade Locks Historic District =

Historic district in Ohio, United States

- U.S. National Register of Historic Places
- U.S. Historic district
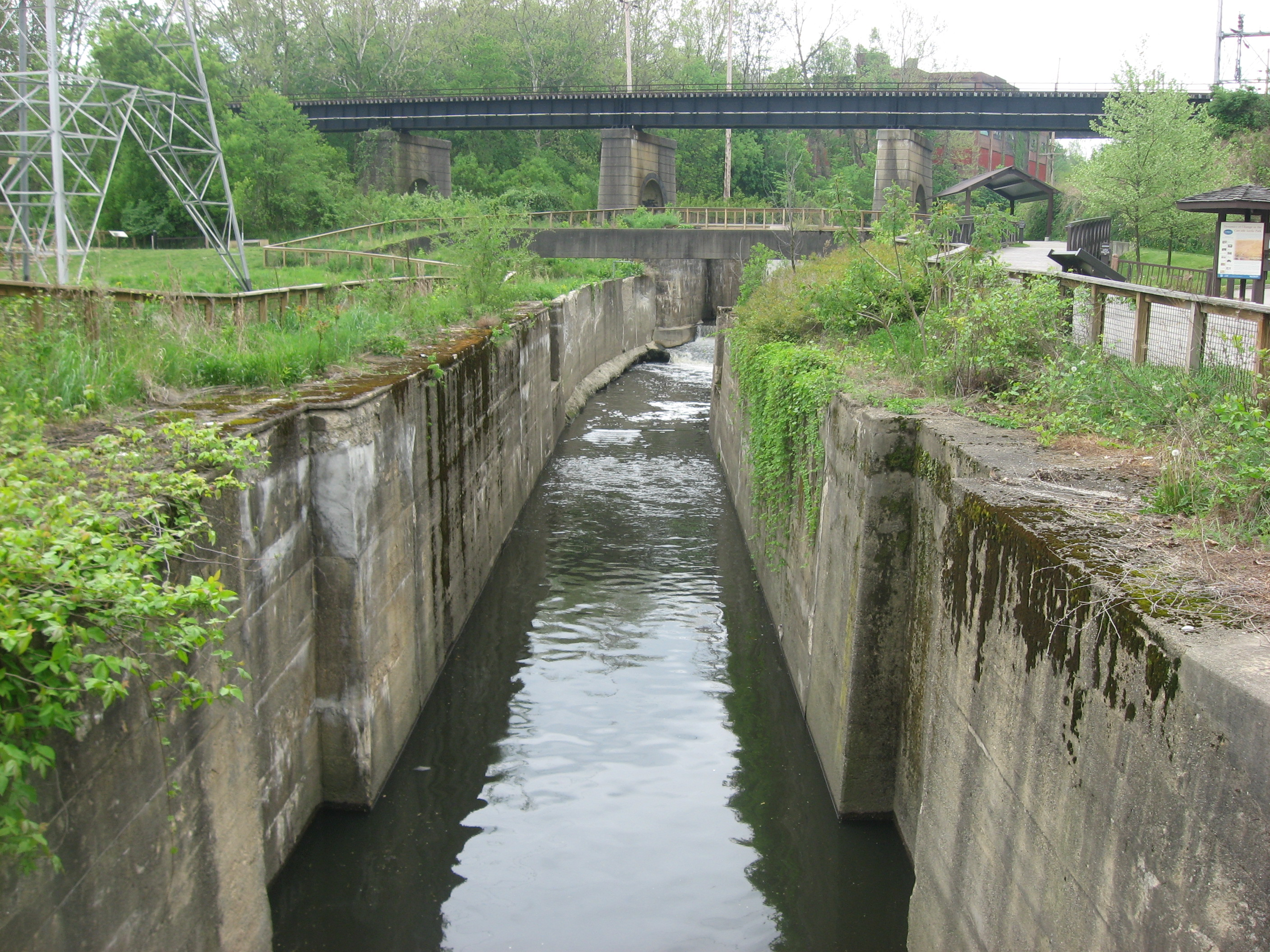
- Lock 14

- Location within Ohio Location within the United States
- Location: Roughly bounded by North, Howard, Innerbelt Route 59 and the canal from Locks 10 to 15, including discontiguous parts N, Akron, Ohio
- Coordinates: 41°5′35″N 81°31′16″W
- Area: 25 acres (10 ha)
- Built: 1827
- Architectural style: Chicago, Greek Revival, The Commercial Style
- NRHP reference No.: 92001627
- Added to NRHP: December 10, 1992

The Cascade Locks Historic District is a historic district located in Akron, Ohio. It was added to the National Register of Historic Places in 1992.

== History ==
Located immediately northwest of downtown Akron, the Cascade Locks Historic District is a ravine that opens up to a flat plane where the Ohio and Erie Canal empties into the Little Cuyahoga River. This area of the canal included the steepest grade of the entire 304 miles between Lake Erie to the Ohio River. The district was the site of many industrial operations during the 19th and early 20th centuries, fueled by the abundant hydraulic power created by the steep descent of the runoff from the parallel Crosby's Mill Race. Along with providing an industrial power source, canal operations provided ample time and traffic for commerce. With each lock, canal traffic stopped. There were 21 locks in the Akron area, and it took boats six hours to get through the two miles of canal. A popular establishment for canallers was located in the Cascade Locks area. Though it originally functioned as a cigar box plant with its own mill race, the Mustill Store was best known as a “swilling place” across from Lock 15. The 1913 flood brought an end to the canal. Several locks were dynamited to prevent inundating the downtown area. The most damaged area of the canal included the cascade locks. The canal commission determined the system was not salvageable. Water from the Summit Lake is controlled by ODNR by a dam/gate system at Lock 1 to prevent the disaster that happened in 1913. From there, it flows unimpeded over the locks and into the Little Cuyahoga River. There are many varied buildings and sites within the district including the Mustill Store—now a visitor center and canal museum. The district also includes the site of the original mills of Ferdinand Schumacher—founder of Quaker Oats; two railroad bridges spanning the gorge; a steam plant and two rubber factories; numerous lock and waste way ruins. A footpath currently runs alongside the locks. The Ohio and Erie Canal towpath hike/bike trail is complete throughout the Cascade Lock Park and a bridge connect the trail from Harvard Avenue in Cuyahoga County to the Southern Boundary of urban Akron in Summit County.
