= Farm Crest Bakeries building =

Building in Columbus, Ohio, United States

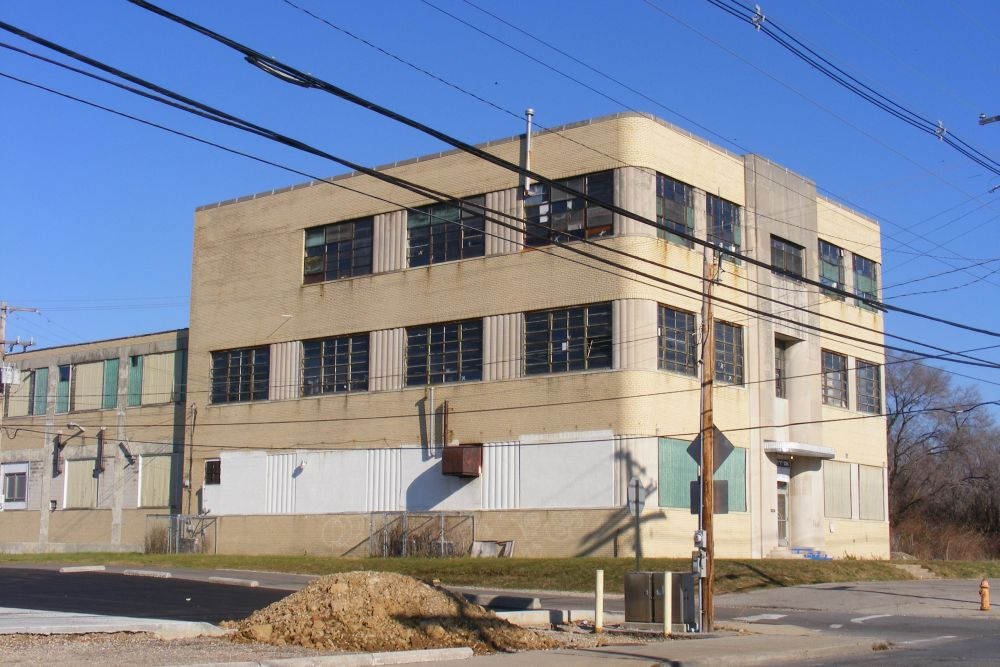
- Interactive map of the Farm Crest Bakeries building area

General information
- Architectural style: Streamline Moderne
- Location: 1826 E. Livingston Avenue, Columbus, Ohio
- Coordinates: 39.949340°N 82.948759°W
- Construction started: September 1947
- Inaugurated: November 19, 1950

Design and construction
- Architect: Charles W. Cloud (consulting)

The Farm Crest Bakeries building, also known as the Hoffman Container Factory, was a historic building in the Driving Park neighborhood of Columbus, Ohio. The Streamline Moderne building was constructed from 1947 to 1949, and was lauded at its opening as a modern and innovative facility.

== Attributes ==
The three-story Farm Crest Bakeries building sat on a 3.5-acre (1.4 ha) site at the corner of East Livingston and Rhoads avenues. It measured approximately 350 ft (110 m) along Rhoads with 80 ft (24 m) of frontage along Livingston Avenue. The Streamline Moderne building was one of the few buildings constructed in an Art Deco style that remained in Columbus until the 21st century. Its consulting architect was Charles W. Cloud.

The building had reinforced concrete walls finished with ceramic tile and with buff brick exteriors. Its original floors were of tile or wood. Lighting was provided by large windows and fluorescent lights. Original bakery rooms included those for production, an employee lounge, a first-aid station, restrooms, and a laboratory to investigate production problems. It was to have a 200-foot continuous automatic baking oven.

== History ==
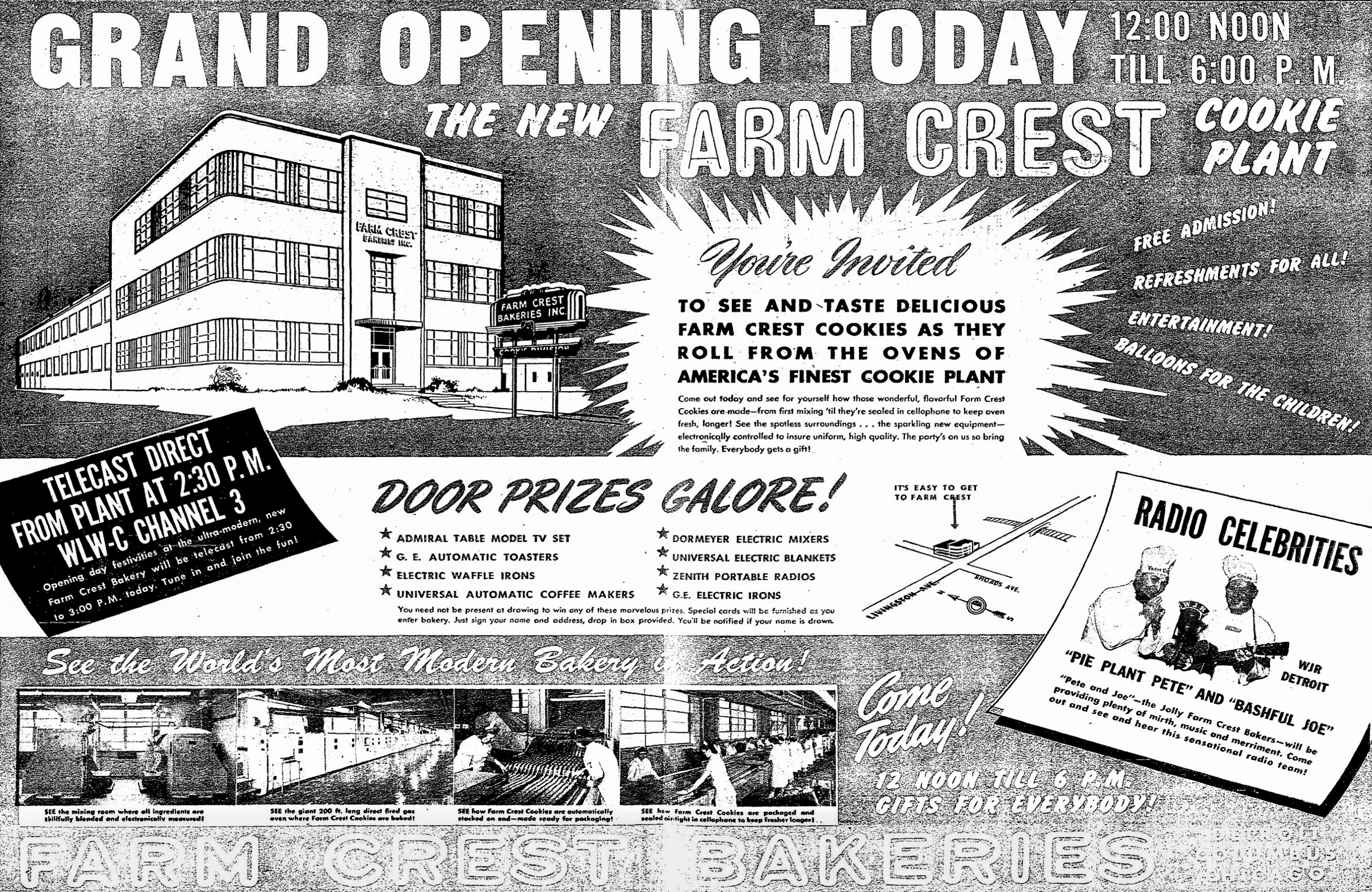
Advertisement for the building's opening day festivities

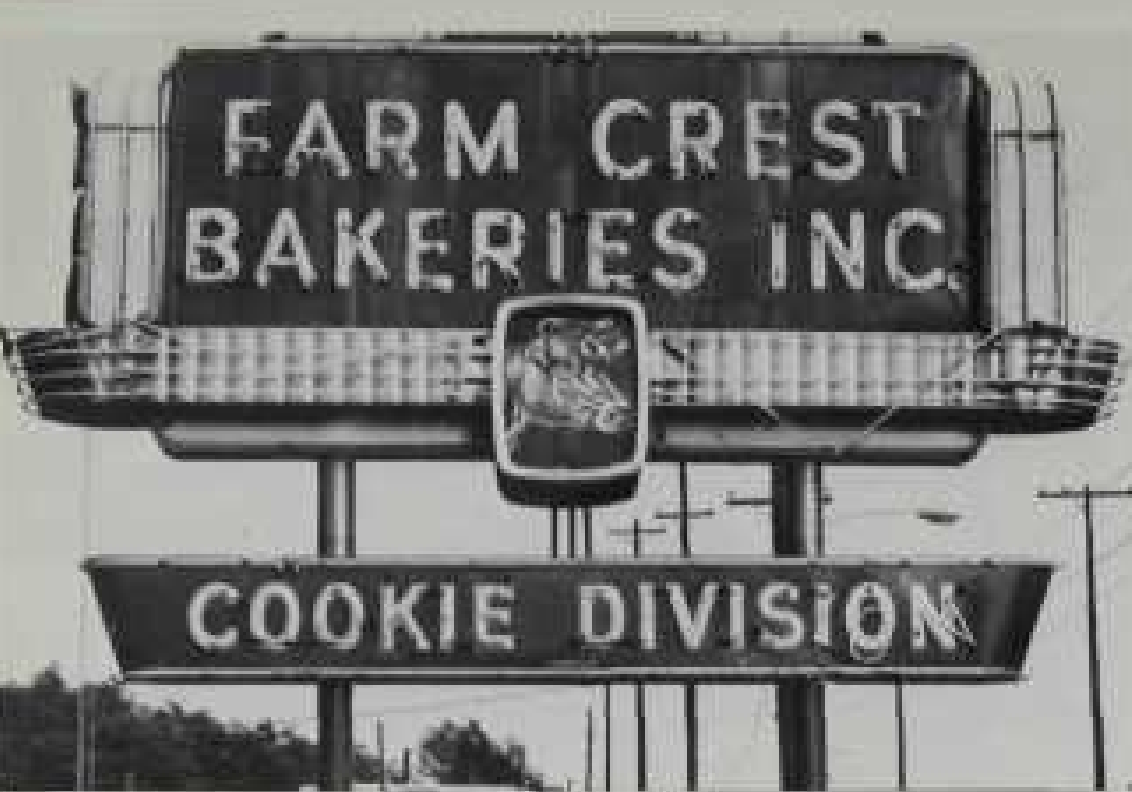
Original factory sign

The building was constructed in 1949 as a cookie factory, owned by Farm Crest Bakeries. Farm Crest was founded around 1930 as a cake manufacturer, based in Detroit. The founder's son, Raymond Grennan, assumed control of the company in 1936 and began its cookie manufacturing the following year.

The building's construction was approved on June 23, 1947 and began in September of that year, and had an estimated cost of $350,000. It was to manufacture cookies for Farm Crest's Jersey Farm Baking Co. division, serving markets between the east coast and Mississippi River. The factory would take over cookie baking operations from the Detroit plant, with some staff to transfer to the Columbus plant, and a total staffing estimated at 200 workers. It began operation in May 1949, and was one of 80 manufacturers that exhibited at the "Made in Columbus Exposition" at Columbus City Hall that July.

The building's grand opening was paired with news articles and congratulatory messages and ads spanning the first eleven pages of a November 1950 issue of The Columbus Dispatch. It was described as "the last word in industrial architecture", with modern lighting, sanitary materials in its construction, and an efficient layout. The opening celebration on November 19 included a six-hour open house with tours, games, prizes, and music, presided over by the city's mayor, James A. Rhodes.

Around 1993, General Theming Contractors began renting a studio in the building. By 2003, it employed 50 artists there and desired purchasing the building, expecting further company expansion. It sought to find PCBs in the old facility, which had been used for recycling steel drums and appliances, and handled electrical transformers. Finding PCBs would then remove the requirement for a pre-sale EPA review. Around 2005, the site was awarded an $82,000 grant for an environmental assessment of the site under the Clean Ohio Fund. In 2008, Franklin County Child Services opted to rehabilitate the building and move two of its nearby offices into the space, though Franklin County commissioners later voted against the plan.

A 2022 plan to redevelop the property involved demolishing the building. A housing developer, Woda Cooper, submitted a proposal and variance request to the city in April 2022. The plan includes clearing the site and building two four-story buildings with 124 apartment units, in addition to storefronts on Livingston Avenue. An earlier proposal, shown to community groups, called for 134 units without storefronts. The site was added to Columbus Landmarks' 2022 list of most endangered properties.

== Gallery ==
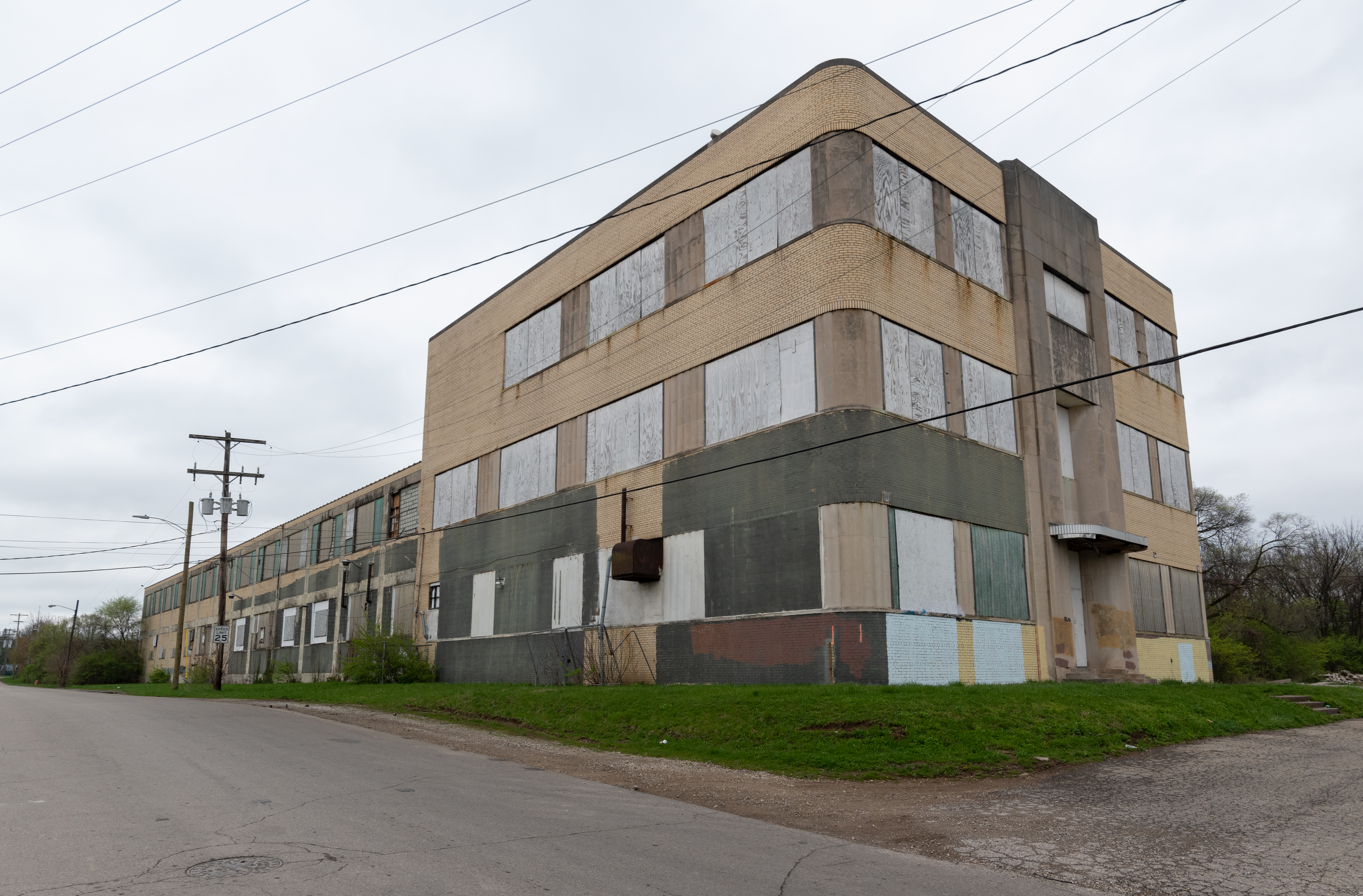
The building in 2022

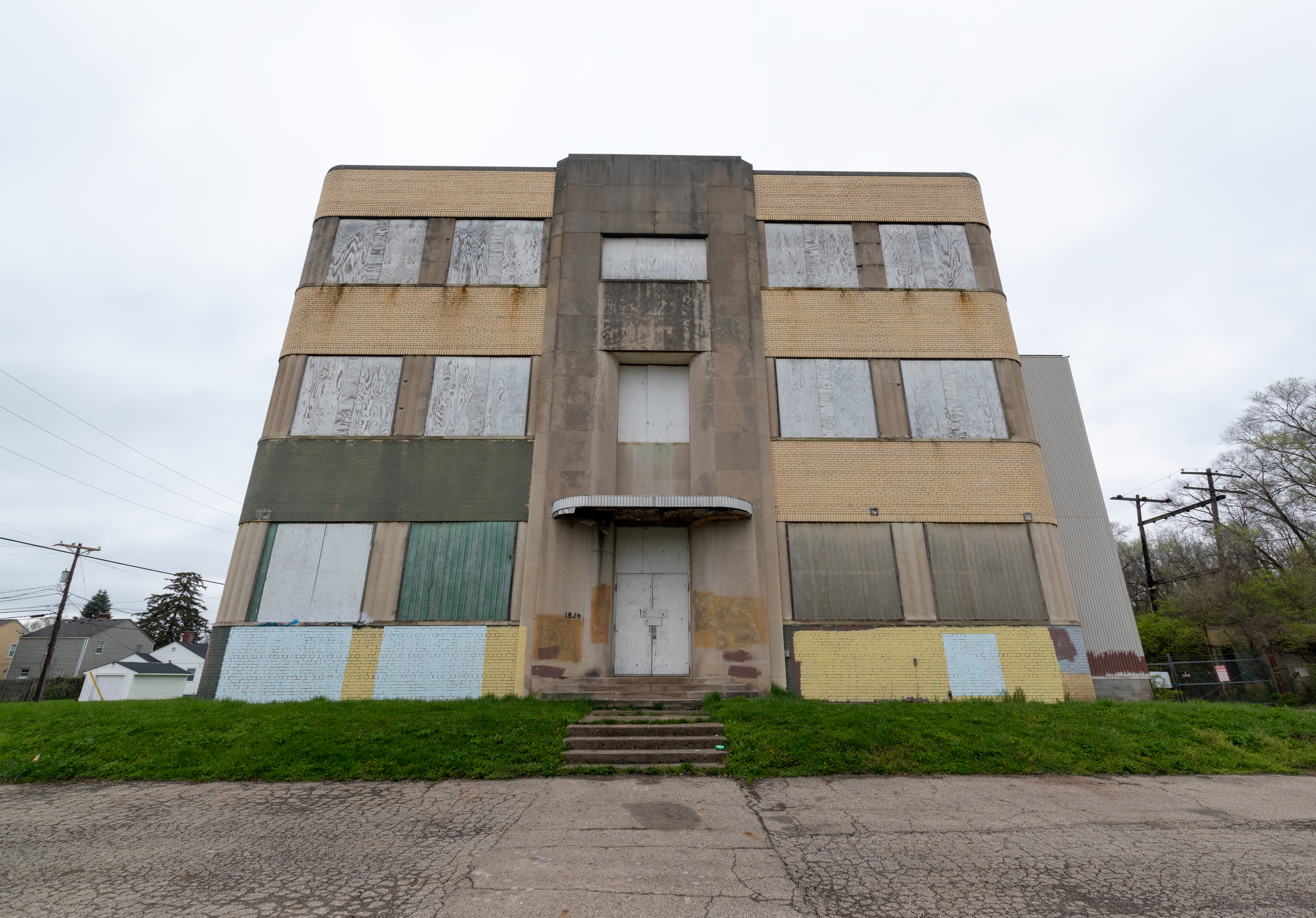
Main facade

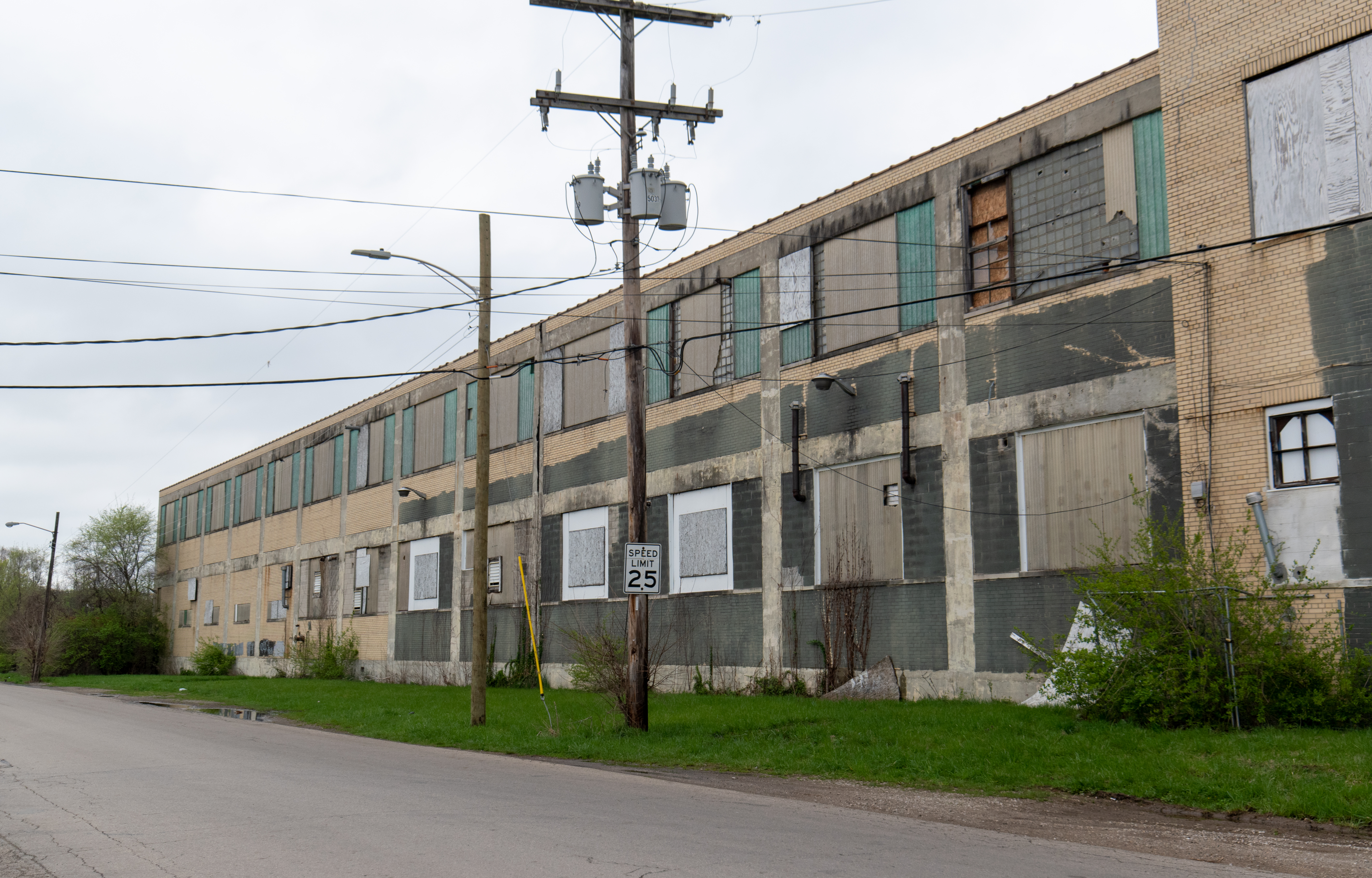
West-facing bays

== See also ==
- List of Art Deco architecture in the United States
- List of demolished buildings and structures in Columbus, Ohio
