= Main–Market Historic District =

Historic district in Ohio, United States

- U.S. National Register of Historic Places
- U.S. Historic district
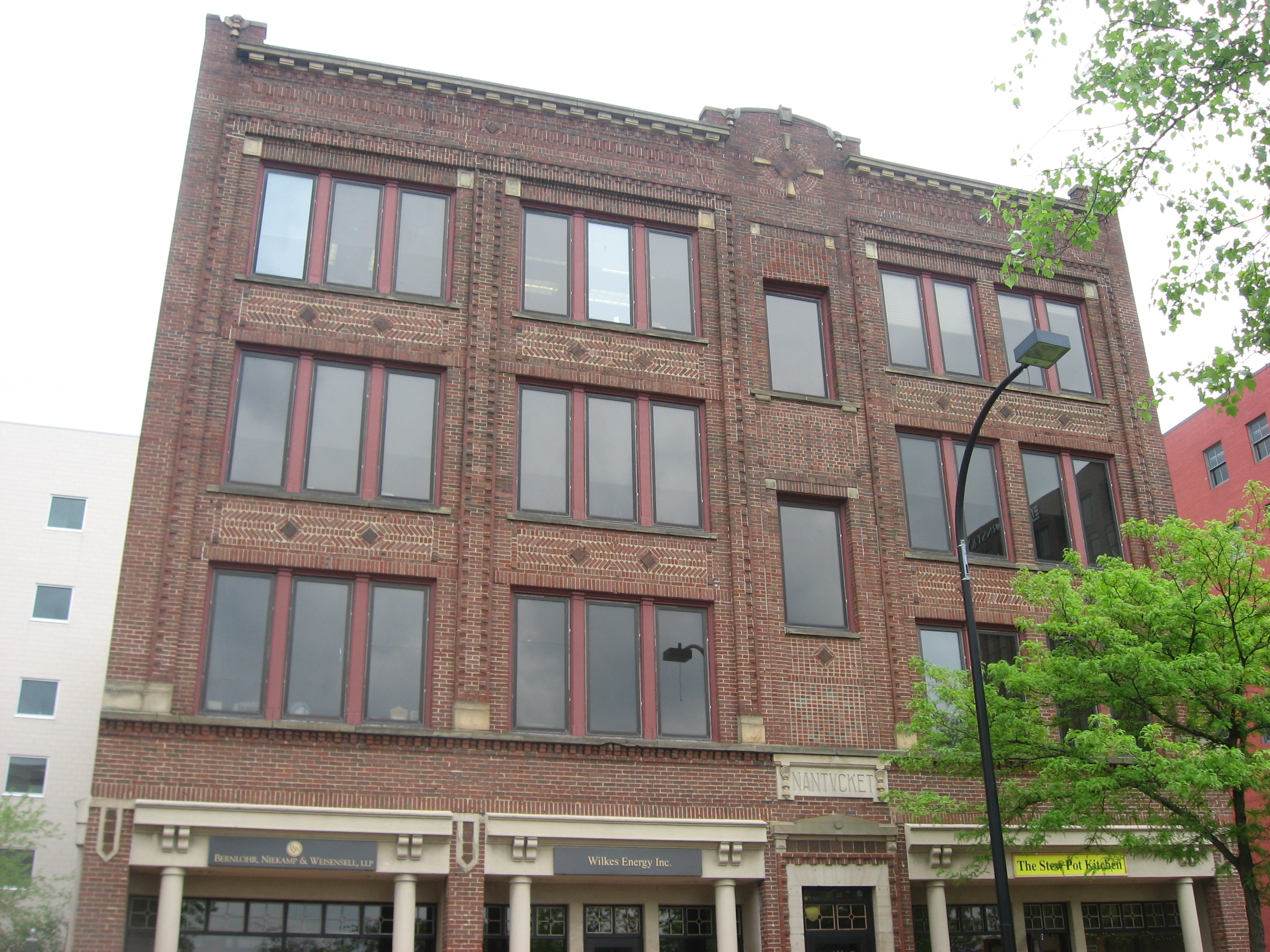
- Nantucket Building on Main near Market

- Location within Ohio Location within the United States
- Location: 15-47 N. Main St., 1-39 S. Main St., 39-168 E. Market St., 18-42 N. High St., 70 Broadway St., Akron, Ohio
- Coordinates: 41°05′06″N 81°30′58″W
- Area: 30 acres (12 ha)
- Built: 1865
- Architect: Harpster & Bliss et al.
- Architectural style: Greek Revival, Second Empire
- NRHP reference No.: 03000719
- Added to NRHP: August 01, 2003

The Main–Market Historic District is a historic district located in Akron, Ohio. It was added to the National Register of Historic Places in 2003.

== History ==
The Main–Market Street Historic District is the heart of the North Village of Akron's original town plat, created in August 1833. Developed to the north of the canal town of Akron, and eventually merged into one city, this area of Akron has long been a successful commercial center. The intersection of Main and Market is now a primary gateway into downtown Akron. The district reflects Akron's late 19th and early 20th century economic boom from the milling and rubber industries.

Buildings of note in the district include the Old Akron Post Office, an Italian Renaissance Revival building constructed in 1899 designed by James Knox Taylor. The brick building design is dominated by several large limestone trimmed archways and has a very low slope hip roof. No longer serving as a post office, the building is now the Akron Art Museum. One of the most dominant buildings in the district is the United Building, built by the United Cigar Store Company in 1924 at a cost of one million dollars. Designed in the Neo-Classical style, the building has the vertical orientation of a classical column, with the corner elevations clearly divided into separate base, shaft and capital sections.

The Northern Ohio Traction and Light Company building was constructed in the Beaux Arts style. Clad in white glazed terra cotta, the six-story building features colossal composite piers, arondel ornamented frieze and a Greek key sill course. The Carnegie Library is a buff sandstone building also designed in the style of Beaux Arts Classicism. The highly sculptural two-story building was designed by architect Frank O. Weary who designed several other prominent Akron buildings during the late 19th and early 20th centuries, most notably the Glendale Cemetery Memorial Chapel.

The Commerce Block-Hermes Building Building was constructed in 1870, but its Neo-classical stone ashlar façade now reflects the changes the district went through from the late 19th to the early 20th century. The elevation facing Maiden Lane Alley includes paired windows with round arch drip molding, reflecting its commercial Italianate origin. One of the first important cultural buildings, the Everett Building, was completed in 1871. Constructed in the Second Empire style with local sandstone and brick, the building housed a performance hall, offices and retail space. After an 1897 fire, owner S.T. Everett renovated the building and added two additional stories, making it primarily offices, although the Akron Public Library occupied the second story.
