= Grace Reformed Church (Akron, Ohio) =

Historic church in Ohio, United States

- U.S. National Register of Historic Places
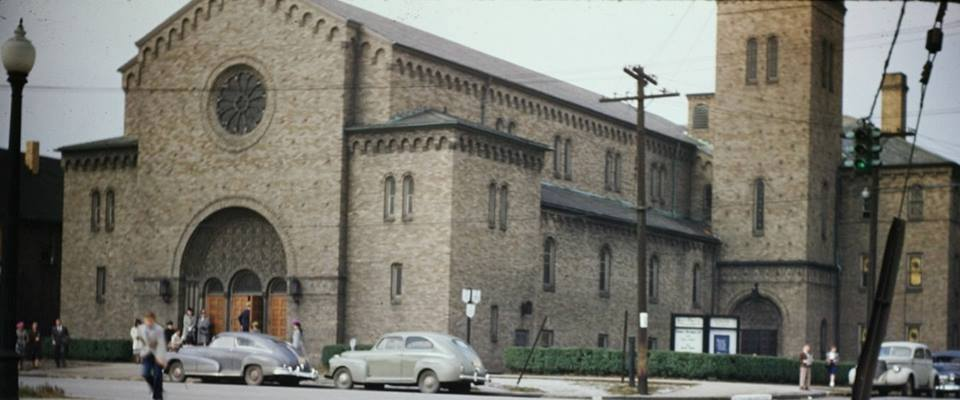

- Location within Ohio Location within the United States
- Location: 172 W. Bowery St., Akron, Ohio
- Coordinates: 41°4′48″N 81°31′28″W
- Area: less than one acre
- Built: 1926
- Architect: Associated Architects, Akron, OH; Henry & Murphy
- Architectural style: Romanesque
- NRHP reference No.: 84003806
- Added to NRHP: July 19, 1984

Grace Reformed Church (Grace United Church of Christ - Akron, Ohio) was a historic church at 172 W. Bowery Street in Akron, Ohio.

It was built in 1926 and added to the National Register in 1984.

The property was purchased by Akron Children's Hospital and the building demolished in 2016.
