= Akron YMCA Building =

- Akron Y.M.C.A. Building
- U.S. National Register of Historic Places
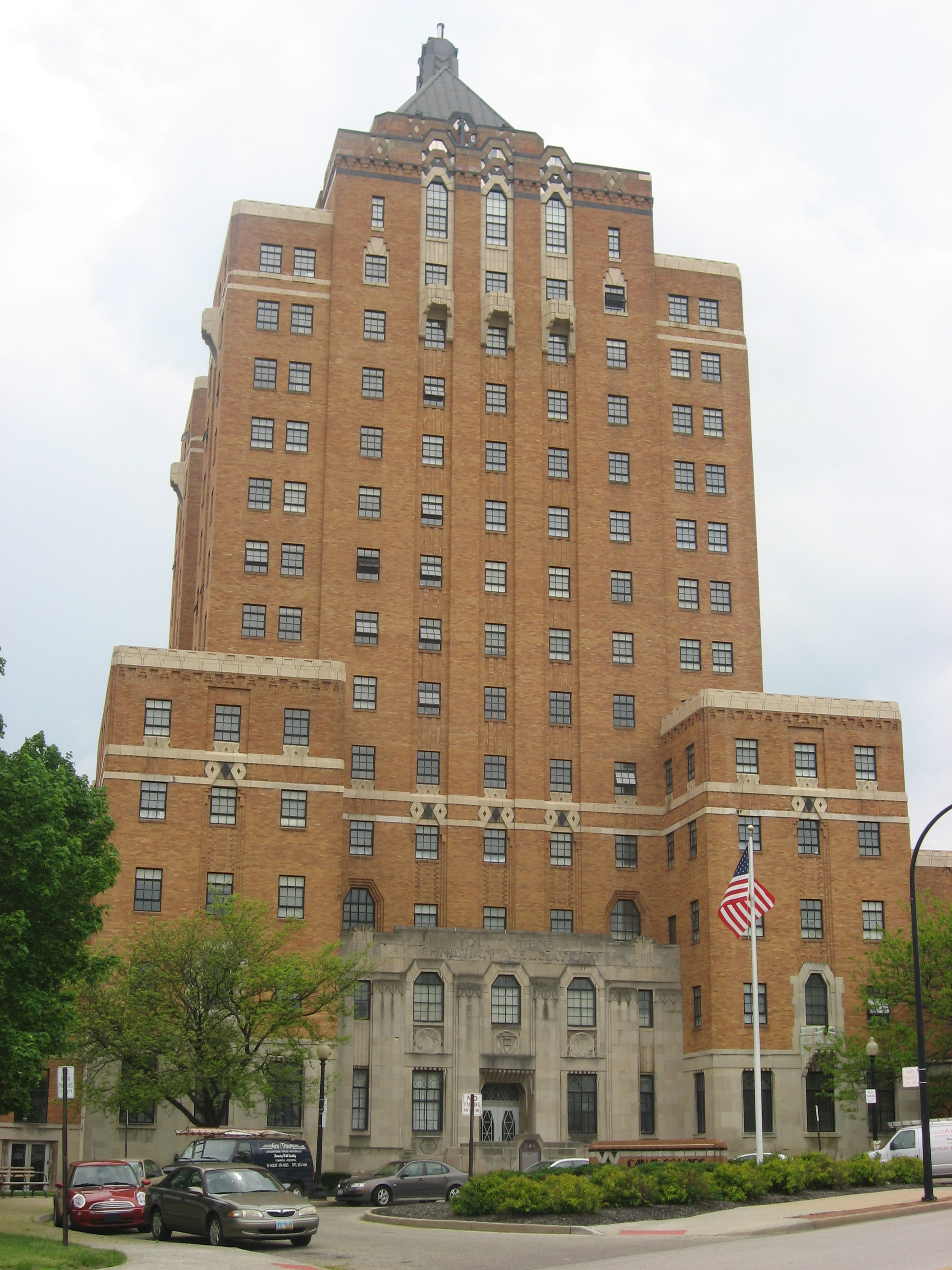
- View from north

- Location within Ohio Location within the United States
- Location: Akron, Ohio
- Coordinates: 41°4′51.30″N 81°31′26.35″W
- Built: 1930-31
- Built by: Clemmer-Noah Construction Company
- Architect: Good & Wagner
- Architectural style: Art Deco
- NRHP reference No.: 80003237
- Added to NRHP: 1980-10-31

Akron YMCA Building is a registered historic building in Akron, Ohio, listed in the National Register on October 31, 1980. Although the YMCA is still in the building for which it is named, they no longer own the building, and now lease their space (consisting of exercise and sports facilities, as well as meeting rooms, which cover parts of the first 5 floors) from the owner.

In the late 1980s to early 1990s, the main portion of the center of the building underwent extensive remodeling, and now consists of 55 apartment units (some consisting of two-story "townhouse" units, including a secured two-level penthouse unit). It also has office space on the first floor and basement level, and has a secured garage in the basement of the building. Tenants of the building are not given access to the YMCA just because they are tenants; a membership must be purchased. Likewise, members of the YMCA do not have access to the apartments or offices, unless they are also leasing space.

In 2008, the building was highlighted by the City of Akron, Ohio as one of seven historic landmark buildings in the City of Akron, during a year-long celebration of the history of the city.

== History ==
The Akron Area YMCA was founded in 1870. After renting space for almost 25 years, in 1904 they moved into their first building, built downtown by architects Bunts & Bliss. In the 1920s, planning for the new building was begun. The new building was designed by John R. Luxmore of Good & Wagner, a local firm also responsible for the Akron Municipal Building. Construction of the Art Deco building began in 1930 and was completed in 1931. It was intended to be used as most YMCA branches were used in that era: a Christian organization that was meant to give people a place to eat, stay for short or long terms, and worship. The exercise facilities in place today were used for a variety of different reasons then, but it was originally constructed with an indoor pool which is still in use. The main part of the building was used as living space for many of its members (of both sexes), and was the only place some could turn when they had not much else.

In the 1970s and 1980s, the living spaces fell further and further into disrepair, and was one of the reasons the building was sold for renovation.

== Notes ==
The small semicircle in front of the building was dedicated at some point during remodelling, and is known as "Canal Square Plaza". Being the only building on the semicircle, the building's address is therefore "1 Canal Square Plaza". However, because AT&T, the local phone company, has a computer system that does not recognize that address, they cite the building's address as "80 West Center Street" (the old address). Every other service, including the US Post Office, recognizes the Canal Square Plaza address. However, the issue with AT&T has caused many problems and much confusion with incorrect listings, including phone books and internet sites.
