= Akron Fulton International Airport Administration Building =

- U.S. National Register of Historic Places
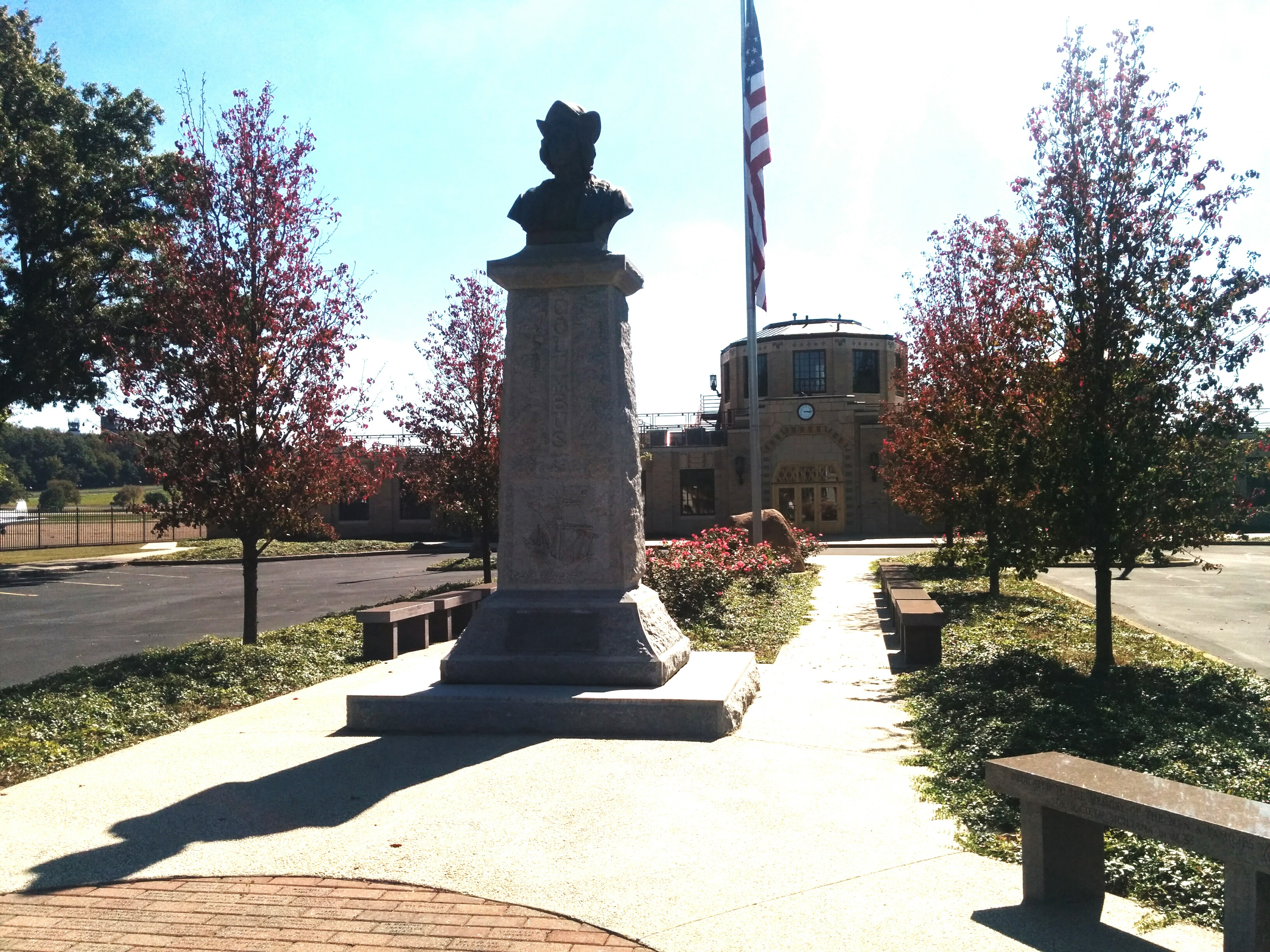
- The building and the monument in front of it

- Location within Ohio Location within the United States
- Location: Akron, Ohio
- Coordinates: 41°2′33.92″N 81°27′46.94″W
- Architect: O. C. Harbaugh and Michael M. Konarski
- Architectural style: Art Deco
- NRHP reference No.: 01001361
- Added to NRHP: 2001-12-21

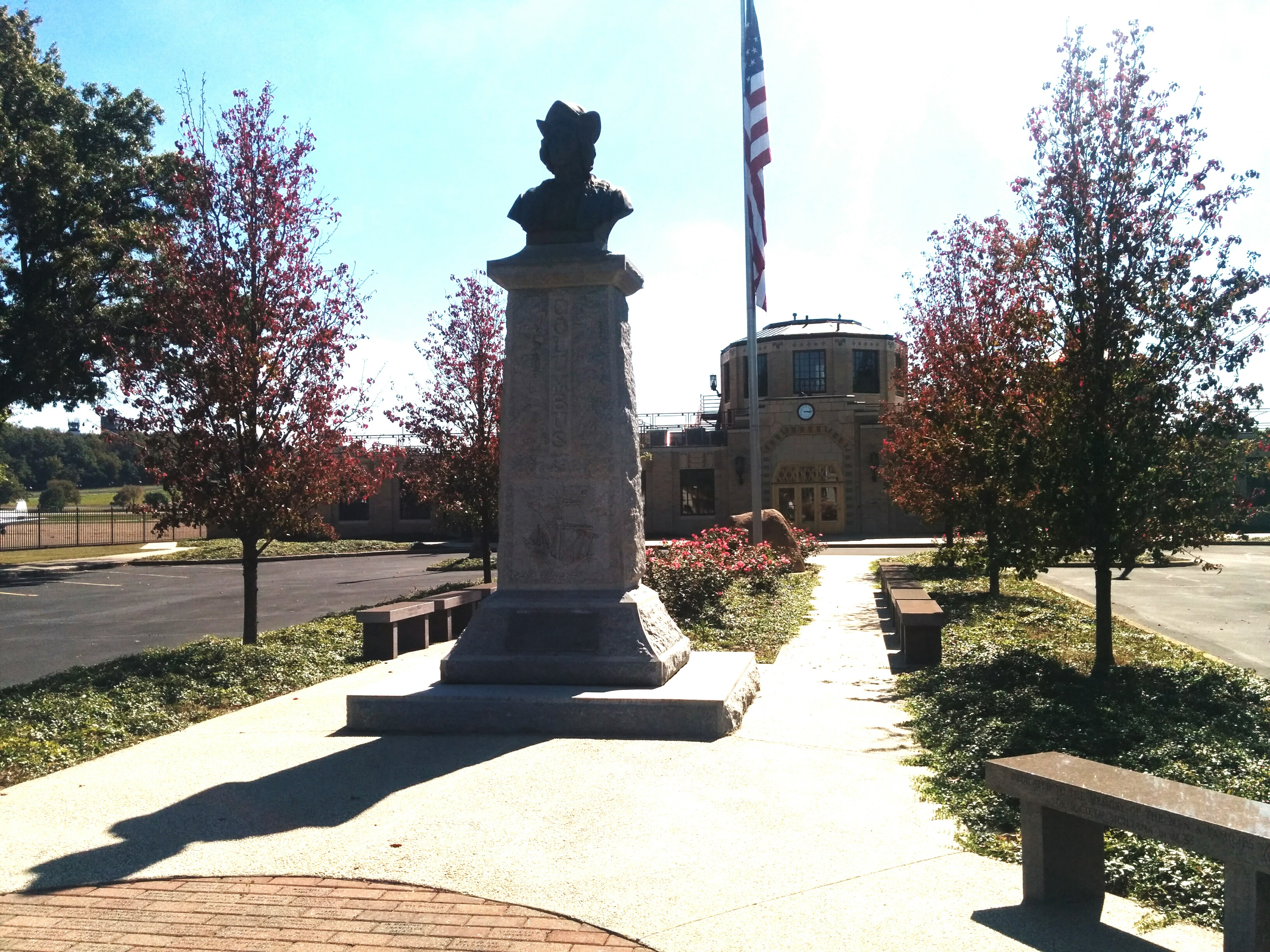
Akron Fulton International Airport Administration Building

Akron Fulton International Airport Administration Building is a registered historic building in Akron, Ohio, listed in the National Register on December 21, 2001.

The administration building is a significant contribution to the development of early commercial aviation in Akron. Its Art Deco architecture and its design are a good representation of the development of airports during the first major expansion of air travel in the 1920s and 1930s. The administration building is located just north of the runways and the Goodyear Airdock, which was built in 1929. The Akron City Council authorized construction of the terminal in 1930, with construction completed and the terminal opening on June 15, 1931.

The location and layout of the terminal was influenced by the City Beautiful movement, originally reached through a landscaped traffic circle and at the end of a boulevard-like parking area with lines of trees. The terminal building is in an Art Deco style, with a facade built of cream-colored brick and terra cotta detailing with cream, muted orange, and soft green colors.

The terminal served commercial air traffic until 1962, when the Akron–Canton Airport opened to the south. The customs and administrative offices continued to serve traffic from Canada, as well as small aircraft traffic, until the early 1990s. At that time, the property was sold, and the terminal was adaptively reused as Cafe Piscatelli, an Italian restaurant. The Cafe Piscatelli closed doors for good on August 26, 2005. It has since been adaptatively reused a second time as a facility for locally-based Theken Companies. As of September 2026 the building was listed for sale at $4,000,000 by Hoff & Leigh Commercial Real Estate as a fully-restored class A office space.
