= National City acquisition by PNC =

Merger of PNC and National City Banks

The transitional logo used by PNC Financial Services after it finalized the purchase of National City Corp., January 2009 –June 2010.

The National City acquisition by PNC was the deal by PNC Financial Services to acquire National City Corp. on October 24, 2008 following National City's untenable loan losses during the subprime mortgage crisis. The deal received much controversy due to PNC using TARP funds to buy National City only hours after accepting the funds while National City itself was denied funds, as well as civic pride for the city of Cleveland, Ohio, where National City was based.

== Pre-merger history ==
Both PNC and National City's corporate histories date to the mid–19th century. National City was founded as the City Bank of Cleveland in 1845, while PNC was founded in longtime Cleveland rival, Pittsburgh, as the Pittsburgh Trust and Savings Company, in 1852. Both banks would later receive national charters under the National Banking Act, with National City being able to print U.S. currency until the United States Treasury assumed operations in the 1920s. Both would have strong bases in their home markets, although PNC would until the 1980s be dwarfed in Pittsburgh by Mellon Bank (now The Bank of New York Mellon) and the massive influence of the Mellon family.

Both banks began interstate expansion in the 1980s, with the two eventually competing in Cincinnati and Louisville by the end of the decade. In late 1992, PNC announced plans to acquire Youngstown, Ohio-based Ohio Bancorp. PNC later backed out of the deal, and National City acquired Ohio Bancorp instead in 1993, with the same branches and even some employees of Ohio Bancorp still employed with National City at the time of the PNC deal. Many of the same employees working for Provident Bank of Cincinnati remain with PNC today after National City's acquisition of Provident in 2004.

Although PNC would never enter the Cleveland market on its own before the National City deal, National City did enter Pittsburgh in late 1995 with its acquisition of Pittsburgh-based Integra Bank, putting it in third in market share behind PNC and Mellon, and eventually second after Mellon sold off its retail banking division to RBS–owned Citizens Financial Group in 2001.

As early as 2003, there were talks of a potential PNC–National City merger down the road, with National City being the surviving entity. However, PNC CEO and Chairman Jim Rohr, a Cleveland native who would later orchestrate PNC's acquisition of National City, insisted at the time that PNC was not for sale.

== National City problems ==
The downfall of National City began in 2007 when the United States housing bubble began to burst, and consumers defaulted on subprime mortgages. Although National City was otherwise healthy on paper, the mortgage business was dragging down profits into losses, with CEO Peter Raskind even fearing that the bank might fail. National City then put itself up for sale in March 2008.

Adding to the bank's problems, The Wall Street Journal reported on June 6, 2008, that National City had entered into a memorandum of understanding with federal regulators, effectively putting the bank on probation. Terms of the confidential agreement, entered into a month earlier with the Office of the Comptroller of the Currency (which regulates nationally chartered banks), were not known.

On June 10, 2008, National City Corp. confirmed that it had reached agreements with regulators "regarding capital levels, risk-management practices and other aspects of its business." The company stated that there had been no material developments in these areas since these memorandums of understanding were signed in April and May 2008.

By October 2008, National City was in serious sale discussions following the failure of Washington Mutual and the forced sale of Wachovia to Wells Fargo. Among the publicly known front–runners were Minneapolis-based U.S. Bancorp (U.S. Bank), Toronto–based Scotiabank, and eventual buyer PNC. Scotiabank, which has long stayed out of the U.S. market unlike its Canadian rivals, was considered the best option for the local government since Scotiabank didn't have a pre–existing presence in the United States, allowing most of the National City operations to stay in Cleveland. Although National City and PNC had minimal overlap, the close proximity of Cleveland to Pittsburgh meant massive layoffs in both cities.

Wells Fargo, Fifth Third Bank, and crosstown rival KeyBank all also expressed interest in National City, with Fifth Third even offering to move its corporate headquarters to Cleveland from across the state in Cincinnati if it were to buy National City. Like U.S. Bancorp (U.S. Bank), Fifth Third had a redundant footprint with National City, while Wells Fargo (even after its acquisition of Wachovia) had virtually no overlap with National City at all. KeyBank and National City had very little overlap outside Ohio, although some branches in Northeast Ohio would have likely required divesture.

== Takeover by PNC ==
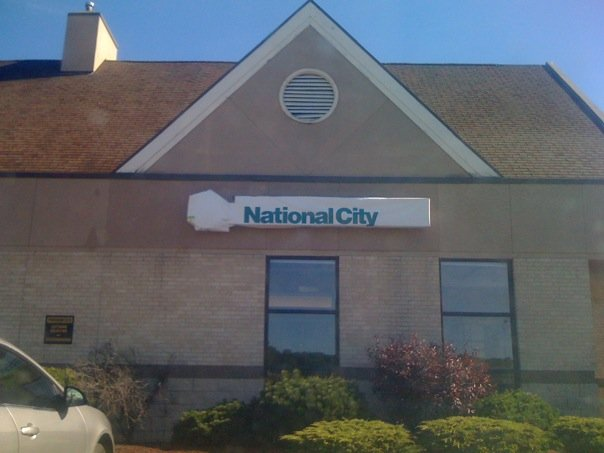
The National City branch in Shenango Township, Pennsylvania near New Castle on September 19, 2009 just before its conversion to PNC Bank, complete with the new PNC sign being covered up by tarpaulin with the National City logo. This branch has since closed.

In early October 2008, PNC had offered a deal with National City, but backed out. Combined with Scotiabank's decision to once again not enter the U.S. market, National City began preliminary merger talks with U.S. Bancorp (U.S. Bank).

Meanwhile, the U.S. government began to issue out TARP funds from the $700 billion bailout plan to banks to help stabilize their funds and issue out loans again. On October 23, 2008, when the National City board of directors were about to decide on the U.S Bancorp (U.S. Bank) deal, PNC made an 11th hour offer to buy National City and be its white knight. The following day, after National City was denied TARP funds by the U.S. government, they accepted PNC's offer at about $5.2 billion in stock. The acquisition was a stock purchase transaction completed before the end of 2008.

The deal initially made PNC the largest bank in Pennsylvania, Ohio, and Kentucky, as well as the second largest bank in Maryland and Indiana. It greatly expanded the PNC presence in the Midwest as well as entering the Florida market. Pittsburgh, Louisville, and Cincinnati were the only three markets before the acquisition deal that both banks had a major presence in. Overall, the deal made PNC the fifth–largest bank in the United States. After the acquisition, PNC conducted a review of National City's balance sheet and took write-offs and reserves of $12.6 billion on the loan portfolio, indicating how severe the problems were at National City.

== Criticism ==
While some Clevelanders didn't like the fact that National City was being taken over by a Pittsburgh–based rival because of the longstanding NFL rivalry between the two cities, many of the reactions to the PNC–National City deal involved the fact that TARP funds were used by PNC to buy National City.

U.S. Representative Dennis Kucinich of Cleveland unsuccessfully fought against the merger, arguing that National City's TARP funds application was never seriously considered, PNC actually took National City's own allotment of TARP funds in addition to its own, and the effects on the local economy. In addition, National City was the only one of the twenty–five largest U.S. banks eligible to receive TARP funds to be denied TARP funds, with Omaha, Nebraska-based Lauritzen Corporation (ranked thirty–seventh nationally) being the next–largest bank denied funds. (Banks owned by foreign companies such as Citizens, HSBC Bank USA, and TD Bank, N.A. were automatically disqualified from receiving TARP funds.) Many Cleveland–based local businesses also had an unsuccessful grassroots movement to save National City.

There was also criticism from National City shareholders. The deal was described as a "take–under," meaning the purchase price was below National City's market value. Shareholders felt that they were being undervalued for their National City stock. Eight National City stockholders received a settlement from PNC on July 31, 2009. Under terms of the settlement, investors dropped their claims in return for the release of more than 400 pages of documents in Delaware State Court.

Nonetheless, the deal was approved by shareholders of both banks on December 23, 2008, and finalized on December 31, 2008.

== Aftermath ==
In the case of Pittsburgh, the two banks had significant overlap to the point it would pose antitrust issues in Western Pennsylvania since both banks had the top two market shares in the Pittsburgh region. As a result, the United States Department of Justice required PNC to sell off 50 National City branches in the Pittsburgh area and 11 more branches in and around Erie, Pennsylvania to competitors. Wells Fargo, KeyBank, and Fifth Third–which had inquired about acquiring National City as a whole and in the case of Fifth Third at the time had existing branches in Pittsburgh–were all interested in buying the National City branches. JPMorgan Chase, Huntington Bancshares, First Niagara Bank and locally based FNB Corporation (who would later buy Fifth Third's Pittsburgh area branches in 2015 when Fifth Third left the market) were also in discussions for the branches, with Huntington and FNB, like Fifth Third, having existing branches in Pittsburgh.

On April 7, 2009, PNC reached a deal with Buffalo-based First Niagara Bank to buy 57 of the branches. First Niagara officially took over those branches on September 8 after the signs were changed over from National City during Labor Day Weekend. The branches not purchased by First Niagara were the four in Crawford County, Pennsylvania that PNC had to divest; of those four, one branch in Titusville was sold to Emclaire Financial Group while the other three (one in Conneaut Lake, the other two in Meadville, including the branch inside Walmart) were sold to Marquette Savings Bank. Although employees at the branches being sold off were retained (First Niagara, in fact, established a regional office in Pittsburgh at 11 Stanwix Street near National City's Pittsburgh headquarters at 20 Stanwix Street, adding more jobs there.), there were still heavy layoffs at National City's headquarters in Cleveland.

Because of the significant overlap in Pittsburgh that remains, PNC closed seven National City branches & five PNC branches on November 6, 2009, and later closed two more PNC branches on April 23, 2010, with the accounts at those branches being moved to the nearby PNC branch that will remain. As part of the agreement to buy the 57 National City branches from PNC, First Niagara has the right of first refusal to buy the National City branches PNC closes. Despite the branch closures and the sale of others to First Niagara, PNC still ended up with a 46% market share in Pittsburgh, over three and a half times the market share of second-place Citizens Financial Group with 13%. By July 2012, PNC's market share in Pittsburgh increased to 48%, more than the rest of the top ten banks in Pittsburgh by deposits combined; it further increased to a virtual 50% by October 2013. By the time Bank of America announced plans for an organic expansion into Pittsburgh in January 2018, PNC's market share in the area had slipped to 42.8%.

Although experts had expected more TARP funds to be used by stronger banks to buy out weaker rivals, no more deals were ultimately done involving TARP funds.

== Conversion to PNC ==
The National City name, as expected, lasted well into 2009 since it would take PNC some time to integrate the two banks together. PNC began to phase out the National City name in favor of PNC on November 7, 2009, starting with Pennsylvania (where the two had the most overlap), Florida, and the Youngstown and Steubenville, Ohio regions. That day also saw the rebranding of National City Mortgage into PNC Mortgage and NatCity Investments fully merged into PNC Investments. In addition, National City's bank charter was merged into PNC's, effectively having the retail banking branches having yet to convert being legally known as PNC Bank, N.A., d/b/a National City Bank.

The conversion of National City to PNC was completed in June 2010, in the following phases:

- February 19, 2010 Central & Southern Ohio (including Cincinnati, Dayton, and the state capital of Columbus), Southeastern Indiana, and all of Kentucky.
- April 12, 2010 Northern Ohio (including National City's home market of Cleveland, Akron, Canton, and Toledo) and all of Michigan.
- June 14, 2010 The rest of Indiana and all of Illinois, Missouri, and Wisconsin.

== Legacy ==
Despite becoming the largest bank in Ohio upon acquiring National City, PNC has since slipped to second–largest in the state behind Fifth Third Bank, and for several years was neck–and–neck with third place Huntington Bancshares for the second-place spot. Much of the losses for PNC came in Cleveland, where many Clevelanders left PNC upon the April 2010 conversion of National City in the area for other banks, most notably KeyBank, which became the Cleveland market's largest bank by deposits. While National City was Cleveland's top bank at the time of PNC's acquisition, PNC slipped to fourth overall in the area behind KeyBank, locally owned Third Federal Savings & Loan, and Citizens Charter One, PNC has, however, been able to regain some of the losses back, and is currently second in the Cleveland market behind KeyBank. In 2011, PNC opened a museum dedicated to the history of National City within National City's former headquarters in Cleveland. With the 2016 announcement that Huntington would acquire FirstMerit Bank, PNC slipped to number three in market share in both Ohio and specifically Cleveland, with Huntington taking over for Fifth Third as the largest bank in Ohio. By 2020, U.S. Bancorp (U.S. Bank) was Ohio's largest bank by deposits, having grown their deposits in the interim through organic growth while Fifth Third remained second, Huntington slipped to third, and PNC slipped all the way to sixth behind KeyCorp and JPMorgan Chase, a far cry from National City's heyday.

Outside of Greater Cleveland, PNC's acquisition of National City has been considered a success by experts. The move allowed PNC to experience growth in Chicago, and was able to use the Florida footprint acquired from National City to expand in the Southern United States. In 2011, PNC expanded its Florida presence by acquiring branches from BankAtlantic in the Tampa Bay Area, and later acquired the Atlanta–area branches of Flagstar Bank and, in a major expansion in the South, RBC Bank from the Royal Bank of Canada. Since the RBC deal was completed, PNC had been mentioned as a possible buyer of Regions Financial Corporation and/or SunTrust (prior to the latter bank's acquisition by BB&T to form Truist) in order to boost its southern presence. Despite the speculation, PNC wouldn't make a major acquisition after RBC until it acquired BBVA USA in 2021, which strengthened its Southern presence and gave PNC a presence in the Western United States to make it a truly national bank.

PNC ultimately paid back its TARP funds in full in February 2010 while the National City conversion was still underway. However, it required the bank to sell its Global Investment Servicing division to BNY Mellon in order to have the funds to buy back its shares.

First Niagara Bank, which had mostly been a semi–regional bank within Western New York before acquiring the National City branches in the Pittsburgh area that PNC had to divest, used the National City branches it bought as a launching pad to expand into other markets, acquiring banks in Philadelphia and New England before acquiring HSBC Bank USA's Upstate New York branches. In 2015, KeyBank acquired First Niagara, bringing the former National City branches into the fold that it tried to acquire from PNC.

It can be argued that one of the biggest benefactors of the PNC–National City deal long-term was a bank with no connection to the deal at all: FNB Corporation. Once a community bank under the First National Bank name in nearby Mercer County, Pennsylvania, FNB gradually grew its branch and deposit network to become Pittsburgh's third largest bank within striking distance of catching Citizens, eventually moving its headquarters to Pittsburgh and growing its network to several states and becoming a partner of the Pittsburgh Penguins.
