= National City Corp. =

American bank and part of National City Corp

National City Corporation

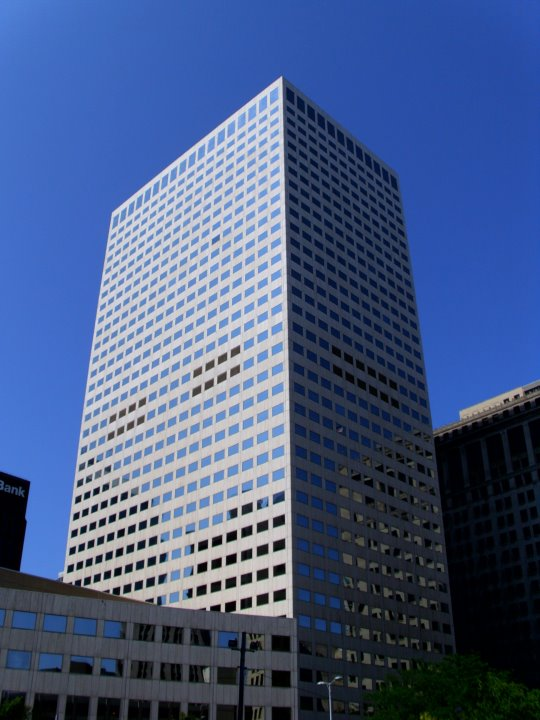
- The National City Center (now PNC Center) former headquarters of National City Corp. in Cleveland, Ohio
- Type: Public
- Traded as: NYSE: NCC
- Industry: Banking; Investment banking; Financial services
- Founded: 1845; 181 years ago
- Defunct: December 31, 2008; 17 years ago
- Fate: Acquired by PNC Financial Services
- Successor: PNC Financial Services
- Headquarters: Cleveland, Ohio, U.S.
- Area served: Regional
- Products: Consumer banking, Corporate banking, Private banking, Financial analysis, Insurance, Investment banking, Mortgage loans, Private equity, Wealth management, Credit cards
- Divisions: NatCity Investments
- Subsidiaries: National City Mortgage
- Website: Official website at the Wayback Machine (archive index)

National City Corporation was a regional bank holding company based in Cleveland, Ohio, founded in 1845; it was once one of the ten largest banks in America in terms of deposits, mortgages and home equity lines of credit. Subsidiary National City Mortgage is credited for doing the first mortgage in America. The company operated through an extensive banking network primarily in Ohio, Illinois, Indiana, Kentucky, Michigan, Missouri, Pennsylvania, Florida, and Wisconsin, and also served customers in selected markets nationally. Its core businesses included commercial and retail banking, mortgage financing and servicing, consumer finance, and asset management. The bank reached out to customers primarily through mass advertising and offered comprehensive banking services online. In its last years, the company was commonly known in the media by the abbreviated NatCity, with its investment banking arm even bearing the official name NatCity Investments.

In 2007, National City Corp. ranked number 188 on the Fortune 500 list, and 9th in terms of revenue in the U.S. commercial banking industry with total assets of about $140 billion.

PNC Financial Services announced October 24, 2008, its purchase of National City for about $5.2 billion in stock with funds from the U.S. Treasury. At the time of the acquisition, National City had been the 7th largest bank in the United States, two spots ahead of acquirer PNC. The deal was finalized on December 31, 2008, and the National City name was retired on June 14, 2010.

== Regulatory scrutiny ==
The Wall Street Journal reported on June 6, 2008, that National City Corp. had entered into a memorandum of understanding with federal regulators, effectively putting the bank on probation. Terms of the confidential agreement, entered into a month earlier with the Office of the Comptroller of the Currency (which regulates nationally chartered banks), were not known.

On June 10, 2008, National City Corp. confirmed that it had reached agreements with regulators "regarding capital levels, risk-management practices and other aspects of its business." The company stated that there had been no material developments in these areas since these memorandums of understanding were signed in April and May 2008.

== History ==
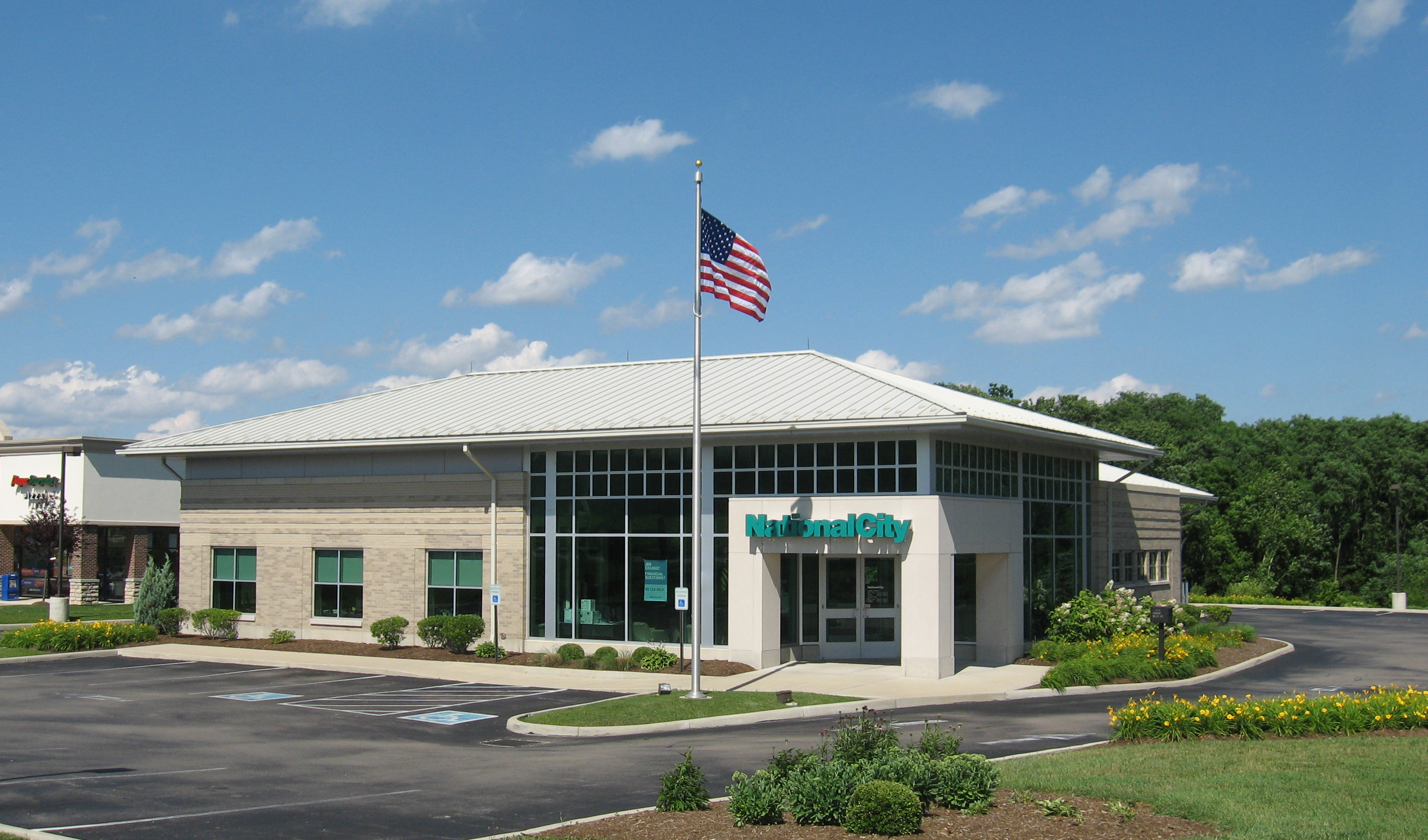
National City branch in Springboro, Ohio.

National City Bank was founded on May 17, 1845, when a group of Cleveland, Ohio businessmen pooled $50,000 to organize the City Bank of Cleveland, the first bank opened under the Ohio Bank Act of 1845 in a small town with no gas, electricity, public waterworks, or railroad. Reuben Sheldon and Theodoric C. Severance, formerly of the Fireman's Insurance Company, organized The City Bank of Cleveland. The city's only bank at the time, opened its doors to the public at No. 52 Superior Street.

National City Corporation was one of the principal players in the Dawes Plan to rebuild Germany in the post World War I period, contributing $173,000,000 in loans. Part of which included a $30,000,000 insurance on the securities of Allgemeine Elektrizitäts-Gesellschaft (A.E.G.), aka German General Electric, and $35,000,000 to American I.G. Chemical (I.G. Farben).

In April 1973, National City Corporation was formed as the holding company for the National City Bank of Cleveland to allow the company to expand outside of Cuyahoga County through the purchase of other banks.

In February 1992, National City announced that all member banks would change over to operate under the National City name within three years. Until this time, all acquired banks had continued to operate under the same name that they were using at the time of their acquisition. This change would allow a unified brand through the company and simplify advertising.

=== Expansion in Ohio ===
In February 1975, National City Corp. announced that it was seeking to acquire the assets of the failed Northern Ohio Bank from the Federal Deposit Insurance Corporation. The acquisition was completed by March 1975.

In March 1975, National City Corp. announced that it was acquiring the Cleveland–based Bank of Cleveland for an undisclosed amount. The acquisition was completed in January 1976.

In December 1975, National City Corp. announced that it was acquiring the Elyria–based First National Bank of Elyria for $4.6 million in cash. The acquisition was completed in August 1976.

In April 1977, National City Corp. announced that it was acquiring the Dayton–based First National Bank of Dayton for $40 million.

In July 1979, National City Corp. announced that it was acquiring the Norwalk–based Huron County Banking Company for an undisclosed price. The acquisition was completed in May 1979.

In September 1981, National City Corp. announced that it was acquiring the Akron–based Goodyear Bank for an undisclosed price.

In December 1981, National City Corp. announced that it was acquiring the Toledo–based Ohio Citizens Bancorp for $64 million in cash and notes.

In March 1984, National City Corp. announced that it was acquiring the Columbus–based BancOhio Bancorp for $310 million in stock and cash.

In May 1986, the troubled Cleveland–based Broadview Savings & Loan Company announced that it was selling 18 of its 38 offices to National City for $24 million.

In June 1989, National City Corp. announced that it was acquiring the insolvent Dayton–based Gem Savings Association without the assistance of federal aid. The acquisition was completed in January 1990.

In April 1993, National City Corp. announced that it was acquiring the Youngstown–based Ohio Bancorp for $200 million in stock and cash and integrating it into National City Bank, Northeast. The acquisition was completed in October 1993.

In February 2004, National City Corp. announced that it was acquiring the Cincinnati–based Provident Financial Group, with its lead bank Provident Bank and offices located in Southwestern Ohio and Northern Kentucky, for $2.1 billion in stock. The acquisition was completed in July 2004.

In June 2004, National City Corp. announced that it was acquiring the Wooster–based Wayne Bancorp for $180 million in cash. The acquisition was completed in October 2004.

=== Expansion in Kentucky ===
In January 1988, National City Corp. announced that it was acquiring the Louisville–based First Kentucky National Corporation for $660 million in stock. The acquisition was completed in July 1988 and it gave National City a strong presence in Kentucky plus a token presence in southern Indiana.

In February 1993, First Kentucky National Corp., a wholly owned subsidiary of National City Corp., was renamed National City Bank Kentucky.

In January 1995, National City Corp. announced that it was acquiring the Lexington–based United Bancorp of Kentucky Inc. for $63 million in stock.

=== Expansion in Indiana ===
In October 1991, National City Corp. announced that it was acquiring the Indianapolis–based Merchants National Corporation with its lead bank Merchants National Bank and Trust Company of Indianapolis and 14 other banks for $604 million in stock. The acquisition was completed in May 1992.

In July 1994, National City Corp. announced that it was acquiring the Kokomo–based Central Indiana Bancorp for $48 million in stock.

In January 1998, National City Corp. announced that it was acquiring the Fort Wayne–based Fort Wayne National Corporation for $800 million in stock. The acquisition was completed in March 1998.

=== Expansion in Pennsylvania ===
In August 1995, National City Corp. announced that it was acquiring the Pittsburgh–based Integra Financial Corporation for $2.1 billion in stock. The acquisition was completed in May 1996 for $2.4 billion in stock.

=== Expansion in Michigan ===
In December 1997, National City Corp. announced that it was acquiring the Kalamazoo–based First of America Bank Corporation, with offices in Michigan, Illinois and Indiana, for $7.1 billion in stock. The acquisition was completed in March 1998.

=== Expansion in Missouri ===
In November 2003, National City Corp. announced that it was acquiring the St. Louis–based Allegiant Bancorp for $475 million in stock. The acquisition was completed in April 2004 for $500 million in stock.

=== Expansion in Florida ===
In July 2006, National City Corp. announced that it was acquiring the Fort Pierce–based Harbor Florida Bancshares for $1.1 billion in stock. The acquisition was completed in December 2006.

In July 2006, National City Corp. announced that it was acquiring the West Palm Beach–based Harbor Fidelity Bankshares for $1 billion in stock. The acquisition was completed in January 2007.

=== Expansion in Illinois and Wisconsin ===
In May 2007, National City Corp. announced that it was acquiring the Clarendon Hills–based MAF Bancorp, with offices in Chicago and Milwaukee, for $1.9 billion in stock. The acquisition was completed in September 2007.

=== Recent transactions ===
National City went on an acquisition spree from 2004 through 2008, headed by its $2.1 billion purchase of Cincinnati–based Provident Financial Group. Provident Financial Group's banking arm, Provident Bank, specialized in warehouse lending facilities whereby it extended commercial credit lines to mortgage banking firms so that the mortgage banking firms could make loans to their customers and either keep those loans or sell them in the secondary market to government-sponsored enterprises (GSEs) or other institutional investors. After the acquisition, National City renamed the division National City Warehouse Resources. The warehouse lending division was a profit center and did not contribute to the bank's downfall. In addition, in 2005, National City acquired Allegiant Bancorp to secure a presence in the St. Louis, Missouri, market. In 2006, they acquired Fidelity Bankshares Inc. for an estimated $1 billion deal that was half cash, half stock. The bank also acquired Harbor Florida Bancshares Inc. through a $1.1 billion stock deal, with both acquired banks located in Florida; these acquisitions gave National City $7.4 billion of assets and 94 branches in Florida.

On the other side of the ledger, National City sold to Bank of America its 83% stake in National Processing Company, which earns fees from processing merchant credit card transactions. The sale of San Jose, California, based First Franklin origination franchise and related servicing platform to Merrill Lynch & Co. was completed on December 30, 2006, for $1.3 billion.

In May 2007, National City announced the purchase of MAF Bancorp Inc., the holding company for MidAmerica Bank. As of June 30, 2006, MidAmerica Bank had the 9th-ranked market share in the Chicago metropolitan area (Chicago-Joliet-Naperville) at 2.18%. Following the merger using the same dataset, the combined National City and MidAmerica Banks were expected to rank 4th in the Chicago market with a market share of 3.96% and deposits of more than $10 billion.

=== Strategic changes and subsequent downfall ===
In the late 1990s, under former CEO David Daberko, National City began a strategy to increase the yields on its assets. In 1999, the company purchased First Franklin Financial Corp., a large subprime mortgage lender. Instead of selling the loans, as most mortgage companies do, National City retained many of the loans to enhance its net interest spreads. It also aggressively originated loans brought to the company by third-party mortgage brokers, as well as originating a large number of home equity loans. The amount of residential mortgage loans grew rapidly and came to exceed the level of commercial loans. By 2003, National City was the sixth-largest mortgage lender in the country. The company did sell its First Franklin Financial subsidiary in December 2006, but retained a large volume of loans that had been originated by the subsidiary. Management failed to recognize the extent of problems in the subprime market and did not take sufficient aggressive actions to reduce its real estate mortgage portfolio. National City subsequently made several other strategic mistakes, including buying back $3 billion of its stock in early 2007, thereby reducing its level of capital, and expanding into the Florida market in late 2006, just before the real estate market there went into a severe decline. As the subprime mortgage market began going into free fall in mid-2007 and continued into 2008, loan losses mounted. In the third quarter of 2007, the company suffered a net loss of $19 million. By the second quarter of 2008, the company had a net loss of $1.8 billion.

=== Acquired by PNC ===
On October 9, 2008, The Wall Street Journal ran an article citing unnamed sources indicating that National City was in talks with several other banks for a possible sale. The article named Pittsburgh-based PNC Financial Services, Toronto-based Scotiabank, and Minneapolis–based U.S. Bancorp (U.S. Bank) as the leading contenders. A spokesperson for National City declined to comment on the report. By taking over National City, Scotiabank would be able to "obtain a larger presence in the U.S. regional banking arena than their Canadian peers", however Scotiabank CEO Rick Waugh declined after they could not properly value National's mortgage assets.

On October 24, 2008, PNC announced that it had finalized a purchase agreement for National City. The acquisition was a stock purchase transaction to be completed before the end of 2008. National City would be merged into PNC, and the National City brand would be dissolved. The deal was approved by shareholders of both banks on December 23, 2008, and the acquisition was completed on December 31.

The deal made PNC the largest bank in Pennsylvania, Ohio, and Kentucky, as well as the second-largest bank in Maryland and Indiana. It greatly expanded PNC's presence in the Midwest, as well as entering PNC into the Florida market. Pittsburgh, Louisville, Kentucky, and Cincinnati were the only three markets before the acquisition in which both banks had a major presence.

In the case of Pittsburgh, the two banks had significant overlap, to the point that it would pose antitrust issues in Western Pennsylvania, since both banks had the top two market shares in that region. As a result, the United States Department of Justice required PNC to sell off 50 National City branches in the Pittsburgh area and 11 more branches in and around Erie to competitors. On April 7, 2009, PNC reached a deal with Buffalo-based First Niagara Bank to sell 57 of the branches; First Niagara officially took over those branches on September 8, after the signs were changed over from National City during that year's Labor Day Weekend. The branches not purchased by First Niagara were the four in Crawford County, Pennsylvania, that PNC was still required to divest: one branch in Titusville was sold to The Farmer's National Bank of Emlenton, with the other three (one in Conneaut Lake, and the other two in Meadville, including the branch inside Walmart) were sold to Marquette Savings Bank.

Although employees at the branches being sold off were retained, there were still heavy layoffs at National City's headquarters in Cleveland. PNC originally stated that 5,800 employees would be laid off corporate-wide across the new organization. In actuality, over 15,000 employees were laid off, all of them from the previous National City, with PNC losing customer and deposit market share in the Cleveland area as a result. National City Bank had been the largest bank in the Cleveland market and held the largest deposit share of all of its competitors. After the PNC merger, crosstown rival KeyBank became the largest bank in Cleveland, gaining a significant share of deposits once held by National City; KeyBank would later buy First Niagara and move into PNC's home market of Pittsburgh with the former National City branches PNC had to sell off.

The National City name lasted into 2010, since it would take PNC some time to integrate the two banks together. Despite the branch closures and the sale of others to First Niagara and Emclaire, PNC still ended up with a 46% market share in Pittsburgh, over three times the market share of second-place Citizens Financial Group, with 13%. PNC began to convert the National City branches that were not sold off or closed on November 7, 2009, starting with Pennsylvania (where the two had the most overlap), Florida, and the Youngstown & Steubenville, Ohio regions. The conversion of National City to PNC was completed in June 2010, in the following phases:

- February 19, 2010 Central & Southern Ohio (including Cincinnati, Dayton, and the state capital of Columbus), Southeastern Indiana, and all of Kentucky.
- April 12, 2010 Northern Ohio (including National City's home market of Cleveland, Akron, Canton, and Toledo) and all of Michigan.
- June 14, 2010 The rest of Indiana and all of Illinois, Missouri, and Wisconsin.

== Combined PNC and National City Facts ==
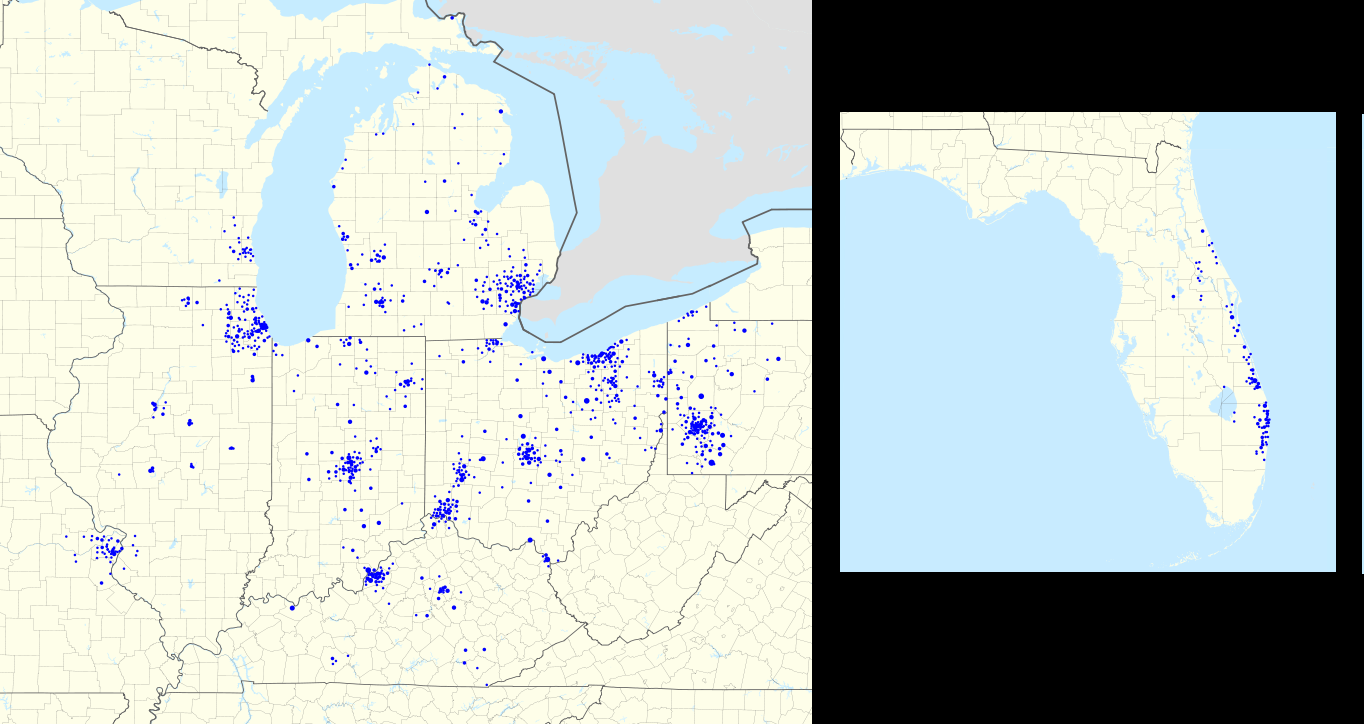
National City branch footprint prior to merger with PNC

- One of the nation's top five banks by deposits and branches
- 60,000 employees across the United States and abroad
- 6,000 ATMs
- 2,600 branches
- $279 billion in assets
- $181.1 billion in deposits
- Shareholder equity $27.5 billion
- Assets Under Mgmt. $121 billion
- Customers- Approximately 5 million consumer and small business customers.

== Historical timeline ==
=== From pioneer times to the Great Depression ===
- 1845: Reuben Sheldon and Theodoric C. Severance, formerly of the Fireman's Insurance Company, organize The City Bank of Cleveland.
- 1865: City Bank of Cleveland becomes National City Bank of Cleveland, receiving a national charter that includes the right to print federal money. This responsibility lasts until the 20th century, when the Federal Reserve assumes the function of printing all U.S. currency.
- 1881: National City Bank records more than $1 million in assets.
- 1901: National City Bank passes $2 million in assets.
- 1912–1913: National City Bank's assets rise from $2.5 million to $4.5 million.
- 1914–1918: National City Bank purchases $100 million in U.S. Bonds to help finance World War I and sees its own assets increase to $15.5 million.
- 1929: National City Bank accumulates $40 million in assets.
- 1933: During the Cleveland bank run, National City Bank keeps paying its depositors 100 cents on the dollar, while most other banks in Cleveland restrict withdrawals to 5 to 10 percent. When many other banks are forced to shut down permanently following Roosevelt's banking moratorium, National City Bank is deemed to be solid, and is permitted to resume full operations.

=== Grows throughout much of Ohio ===
- 1945: Nearing $500 million in assets, National City Bank celebrates its 100th anniversary.
- 1972: National City Bank's assets pass $2 billion.
- 1973: A new holding company, National City Corporation, is created with National City Bank (its name shortened from National City Bank of Cleveland) as its lead bank and primary subsidiary.
- 1975: National City Bank purchases the assets of the failing Northern Ohio Bank for $3.7 million.
- 1976: National City Bank spends $3.8 million acquiring The Bank of Cleveland.
- 1977: The First National Bank of Dayton is the corporation's first major acquisition. Two banks had merged to create the Dayton Bank in 1961: Merchant's National Bank (1871) and People's Bank & Trust Co. (1957).
- 1978: The Huron County Banking company in Norwalk, Ohio, is acquired. The bank is renamed National City Bank, Norwalk in 1985.
- 1980: National City Bank moves its headquarters to the newly constructed 35-story National City Center, as does its parent company, National City Corporation.
- 1982: Ohio Citizens Bancorp in Toledo is acquired.
- 1982: The Goodyear Bank in Akron is acquired. Founded in 1933 by the Goodyear Tire & Rubber Company, it was Ohio's first company–owned bank.
- 1982: Beginning in May, National City Bank becomes one of two Cleveland banks to link its Visa and MasterCard credit card interest rates to the cost of money, changing interest fees every six months according to the fluctuations of Treasury Bill Rates.
- 1982: National City Bank reports a resumption of growth in annual earnings.
- 1984: National City Corporation acquires BancOhio Corporation of Columbus to create the state's largest bank holding company. Together their assets total $12.5 billion, with a banking network encompassing 350 branches in 52 of the state's 88 counties.
- 1986: National City Bank acquires 14 area offices and $460 million in deposits of the Broadview Savings and Loan Company.

=== Becomes interstate bank ===
- 1988: National City Corporation expands into the Kentucky market by acquiring First Kentucky National Corporation of Louisville. Member banks of First Kentucky include First National bank of Louisville (1863); American National Bank & Trust Company, Bowling Green (1886); Crestwood State Bank (1896); Central Bank and Trust Company, Owensboro (1890); third National Bank of Ashland (1916); and First National Bank of Indiana, New Albany (1904). The largest, Commerce National in Lexington, resulted from a merger of Bank of Commerce (1911) and Second National Bank (1883).
- 1989: National City Mortgage Company acquires Shawmut Mortgage Company in Miamisburg, Ohio.
- 1990: National City corporation establishes National City Investment Corporation, allowing the corporation to offer investment choices equal to that of a full-service brokerage.
- 1990: Gem Savings Association, a $1.6 billion asset savings and loan company with 25 branches in Dayton and Cincinnati, is acquired.
- 1991: In October, National City Corporation announces it has reached an agreement with Merchants National Corporation to acquire the Indianapolis-based holding company. Member banks of Merchants National consist of: Anderson Banking Company (1890); Batesville State Bank (1889); Central National Bank of Greencastle (1883); Citizens National Bank of Tipton (1904); Elston Bank & Trust Company (1853); Farmers National Bank of Shelbyville (1886); Fayette Bank and Trust Company (1902); First National Bank of East Chicago (1909); First National Bank of Indiana, Logansport (1931); Hancock Bank & Trust Company, Greenfield (1874); Madison Bank & Trust Company (1833); Mid State Bank, Zionsville (1882); Mid State Bank of Hendricks County, Danville (1904); The National Bank of Greenwood (1934); The Seymour National Bank (1891); and Union State Bank, Carmel (1923).
- 1993: National City acquires Ohio Bancorp, Youngstown. Its member banks are: The Dollar Savings and Trust Company, Youngstown (1887); The Potters Bank and Trust Company, East Liverpool (1881); Peoples Banking Company, Martins Ferry (1891); Bank 2000, Minerva (1915); and The Miners and Mechanics Savings and Trust Company, Steubenville (1913).
- 1995: Central Indiana Bancorp, Kokomo and United Bancorp of Lexington, Kentucky are acquired.
- 1995: National City celebrates its 150th anniversary with $32 billion in assets, 640 branches and 20,000 employees.
- 1995: National City purchases Integra Bank of Pittsburgh for $2.3 billion, and expands into the Pittsburgh market.

=== The final years: a banking conglomerate ===
- 1997: National City merges with First of America creating the 13th–largest banking organization in the U.S. at that time in terms of total assets. First of America is a $22 billion asset bank holding company headquartered in Kalamazoo, Michigan. The combined company had assets of $74.4 billion, deposits of $48.4 billion and stockholders' equity of $6.1 billion.
- 1997: National City purchases certain assets of the mortgage loan origination businesses owned by First National Mortgage Corporation and Eastern Mortgage Services, Inc, and American Mortgage Source, Inc.
- 1998: National City acquires Fort Wayne National Corporation with assets of $3.3 billion.
- 1999: National City closes on acquisition of First Franklin Financial Companies.
- 2004: National City completes $2.1 billion purchase of Cincinnati-based Provident Financial Group.
- 2004: National City acquired Wayne Bancorp, a bank holding company headquartered in Wooster, Ohio, which operated 26 branches and had $825 million in assets. Also acquired Allegiant Bancorp to enter the St. Louis market, adding 36 branch locations to National City's network of 1,100 retail offices located throughout the Midwest.
- 2006: National City sold First Franklin group to Merrill Lynch for $1.3 billion.
- 2006: National City acquires Fidelity Bankshares. Headquartered in West Palm Beach, Fidelity had $4.2 billion in total assets and operated 52 branches.
- 2006: National City acquires Harbor Florida Bancshares, the holding company for Harbor Federal Savings Bank. Harbor Florida is the fifth-largest publicly traded banking institution based in Florida. Headquartered in Fort Pierce, Florida, Harbor Florida has total assets of $3.2 billion and 40 branches.
- 2007: National City acquires MAF Bancorp, Inc., the holding company for MidAmerica Bank, which operated 82 branches throughout Chicago and Milwaukee and surrounding areas. MidAmerica was the 11th largest banking institution in the Chicago market with $5.7 billion in deposits and 58 branches and the fifth largest in Milwaukee with $1.3 billion in deposits and 24 branches.
- 2007: Peter Raskind succeeds David A. Daberko as president and CEO of the company, after Daberko was criticized for his expansion into subprime mortgages, bank acquisitions and share buybacks.

=== Merger with PNC and last actions as independent bank ===
- 2007: National City announces that their Wholesale Mortgage Division will cease operations effective December 31, 2007, in the face of record foreclosures. Employees were notified via email and conference call from Buck Bibb, head of National City Mortgage.
- 2008: National City Corp. disclosed in a regulatory filing that it is the subject of an "informal" Securities and Exchange Commission investigation related to matters including loan underwriting, bank regulatory matters, and the sale of a subprime subsidiary, First Franklin Financial Corporation, to Merrill Lynch for $1.3 Billion in 2006.
- 2008: On October 24, 2008 PNC Bank announced that it had purchased National City. The deal was approved by shareholders of both banks on December 23, 2008. According to a press release by PNC group, PNC intends to merge National City's banking affiliates into PNC Bank and they will assume the PNC Bank name. The merged entity will have its headquarters in Pittsburgh, Pennsylvania.
- 2008: On December 9, 2008, shareholders of National City Corp. filed lawsuits to halt the sale of the commercial bank to PNC Bank
- 2008: On December 31, 2008, PNC completed the acquisition of National City, and is ordered by the United States Department of Justice to sell off 61 National City branches in Western Pennsylvania for antitrust reasons.
- 2009: On April 7, 2009, PNC agrees to sell off 57 National City branches in the Pittsburgh and Erie areas to First Niagara Bank, while the remaining four needed to be sold off–all in Crawford County, Pennsylvania–are sold to locally based independent banks.
- 2009: By the end of Labor Day Weekend, the branches sold off were taken over by their respective buyers. The remaining National City branches still remain under PNC for a few more months before their own conversion to PNC.
- 2010: The National City name is retired in June 2010.
