= Harris Williams =

American financial services company

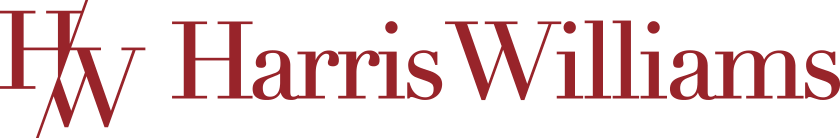
- Type: Subsidiary
- Industry: Investment banking
- Founded: 1991
- Founder: H. Hiter Harris III, Christopher H. Williams
- Headquarters: Richmond, Virginia, US
- Area served: Richmond, Virginia; San Francisco; Boston; Minneapolis; Cleveland; Washington D.C. London; Frankfurt
- Products: Mergers & Acquisitions, Fairness opinions, Restructuring advisory
- Number of employees: 200+
- Parent: PNC Financial Services
- Website: www.harriswilliams.com

Harris Williams is an American multinational independent investment bank and financial services company specializing in advisory services and financing for middle-market companies. The firm provides a variety of advisory services including mergers & acquisitions, fairness opinions and restructuring advisory. Harris Williams operates as a subsidiary of PNC Financial Services.

The firm, which is based in Richmond, Virginia, was founded in 1991. The company operates additional offices in San Francisco, Boston, Minneapolis, Cleveland, Washington DC., London, and Frankfurt. The chief operating officer is Paul Poggi.

== History ==
Harris Williams was founded by Christopher Williams and Hiter Harris, who previously worked together at Charlotte investment banking boutique Bowles Hollowell Conner & Co., a firm later bought by Wachovia. Harris and Williams had previously been classmates at Harvard Business School, from which they graduated in 1987.

The firm has built its business focused heavily on providing advisory services for leveraged buyout transactions and other private equity investments.

== Acquisition ==
In 2005, Harris Williams was acquired by PNC Financial Services and continues to operate as a subsidiary of PNC under the Harris Williams brand.
