= TM Capital Corp. =

- Company type: Private
- Industry: Investment banking
- Founded: 1989
- Founder: W. Gregory Robertson; Paul R. Smolevitz; Michael S. Goldman
- Headquarters: New York, New York; Atlanta, Georgia; Boston, Massachusetts
- Key people: James S. Grien (President and CEO)
- Products: Financial services Investment banking Mergers & acquisitions Recapitalizations; Restructurings; Valuations; Fairness opinions
- Website: www.tmcapital.com

TM Capital Corp. is an independent investment bank with offices in New York City, Atlanta and Boston. The firm advises clients on complex mergers and acquisitions, debt and equity financings, minority and majority recapitalizations, restructurings, and advisory services including takeover defense, fairness opinions and solvency opinions, and valuations. Industry specialties include consumer and retail, industrial, technology & tech-enabled services, business services and healthcare. Its partners are promoted in the trade press. TM Capital is a member firm of Oaklins,

TM Capital was established in 1989 in New York City when its founding partners acquired the investment banking division of Thomson McKinnon Securities Inc. The Firm joined M&A International Inc., a global alliance of mid-market investment banks, in 1994. It opened its Atlanta office, led by Jim Grien, in 2001. In 2008, TM Capital merged with Boston Corporate Finance, Inc., a technology-focused investment bank and a fellow member firm of M&A International Inc., expanding the Firm’s footprint to include Boston, New York and Atlanta. Jim Grien was appointed president upon completion of the merger. Robert Grien joined TM Capital in 2009 to lead its finance and restructuring advisory group.
