= Integra Bank (Pittsburgh) =

Defunct Pennsylvania Bank

Integra Financial Corporation
- Trade name: Integra Bank
- Company type: Public
- Traded as: NYSE: ITG
- Industry: Banking
- Defunct: May 3, 1996; 30 years ago
- Fate: Acquired by National City Corp.
- Successor: National City Corp. - 1995; PNC Financial Services (partial) - 2009; First Niagara Bank (partial) - 2009 (partial)2016 KeyBank (partial) 1995 Northwest Savings Bank
- Headquarters: 20 Stanwix Street, Downtown Pittsburgh, Pittsburgh, Pennsylvania, United States
- Area served: Western Pennsylvania
- Products: Financial services

Integra Financial Corporation was a Pittsburgh-based bank that was eventually acquired by National City Corp. in May 1996 as one of National City's first attempts at becoming a major powerhouse in American banking.

== Overview ==
Integra had expanded throughout Western Pennsylvania through acquisitions of smaller banks in the region, eventually surpassing the privately held Dollar Bank but dwarfed by its three larger rivals, Mellon Financial (now The Bank of New York Mellon), PNC Financial Services, and Equibank.

Unlike those banks, Integra's color scheme was "gold" and "duranautic bronze" (anodization process used for coating aluminum the end result is a dark bronze). The basis for this choice was the impression that these colors represented strength and value. The colors where first used in the Union Nation Bank of Pittsburgh logo designed by Phil Luth of Luth and Katz design firm from New York in 1976. "The Union National Bank of Pittsburgh was the 4th largest bank in Pittsburgh at the time of "State-wide banking" and acquired several smaller banks and used the Integra name as the holding company name. In the late 1980s the holding company name was used more as a trade name. The Union National Bank of Pittsburgh was one of the most profitable banks in the nation until the late 1980s. Charles L. McCune, was President and then Director of The Union National Bank of Pittsburgh for 56 years, served as its President from 1945 until 1972, and then as Chairman until his death. During his life, Charles McCune gave generously to charitable organizations, mostly in the Pittsburgh area, while seeking no public recognition of his philanthropy. He established the Foundation in memory of his parents, Janet Lockhart McCune and John Robison McCune. He was followed by Richard Edwards and then by George Kesel as President of the bank.

=== Sale to National City and subsequent mergers ===
In April 1993, Integra became the area's third-largest bank by purchasing the much larger Equibank, which had moved to downtown from nearby McKeesport in 1964. The deal made Integra the third-largest bank in Pittsburgh behind PNC and Mellon, but also left the institution financially strapped due to Equibank's debts as well as Integra's own financial problems. Unbeknownst to customers of both banks, the Integra-Equibank merger set off a round of musical chairs of name changes for the next 24 years.

In August 1995, Cleveland-based National City Corp. announced that it was acquiring Integra for $2.3 billion, and the acquisition was completed with the branches were converted to the National City name on May 3, 1996. Integra's headquarters at 20 Stanwix Street in Pittsburgh became the regional headquarters of National City. At the time of the acquisition, Integra was third in market share in the Pittsburgh market behind PNC and Mellon. The deal also gave National City entry into the Pittsburgh market. Shortly afterwards, National City consolidated some redundant branches that Integra had while selling eight former Integra branches to Warren, Pennsylvania-based Northwest Savings Bank. Two of those branches were in the Pittsburgh region, giving Northwest its own first expansion into the Pittsburgh market, where it expanded its presence. National City took advantage of Integra's market share and not only was able to retain many customers but add new ones after Mellon sold its retail banking division to Citizens Financial Group in 2001, boosting it to 2nd behind PNC in deposits but first in number of branch offices.

PNC later bought National City itself in 2008 with TARP funds after National City became a victim of the subprime mortgage crisis. Due to antitrust reasons, PNC had to divest 61 National City branches by order of the United States Department of Justice in Western Pennsylvania, most of which were formerly Integra Bank branches. Buffalo-based First Niagara Bank bought most of those branches, meaning that a sizable amount of former Integra Bank branches and accounts are now that of First Niagara, although PNC did retain the others it did not have to divest. In 2016, another Cleveland-based bank, KeyBank, acquired First Niagara, bringing the 5th name change since the initial switch from Union National to Integra in the late 1980s.
