= Bill Demchak =

American banker and CEO of PNC

William Stanton Demchak (born August 24, 1962) is an American business executive in the finance industry and serves as the current chief executive officer of PNC Financial Services. He is credited with being one of the earliest adopters of the credit default swap, especially the creation of markets around them, which due to the role they would play in the 2008 financial crisis, earned him the title "prince of darkness" within the industry.

== Early life ==
Demchak has a Bachelor of Science degree from Allegheny College and an MBA (with an emphasis in accounting) from the University of Michigan. At Allegheny, he was an Alden Scholar, actively participating in student government, the economics club, the Interfraternity Council, intramural sports and Lacrosse. In addition, he was a member of the Phi Delta Theta fraternity, as well as the Phi Beta Kappa Honor Society.

== Career ==
Before PNC, Demchak held a variety of key executive positions at JP Morgan Chase. This includes: Global Head of Structured Finance and Credit Portfolio, involved in strategic agenda (before the JP Morgan-Chase Manhattan merger), member of the board of directors. He says JPMorgan Chase “wasn’t a terribly enjoyable place to work.” He was also a director of Hilliard Lyons Research Advisors.

Demchak is often credited with being the first major adopter of the credit default swap and conceiving the idea of bundling them together and selling them to investors, which is credited with being one of the main factors in the 2008 financial crisis. Within the industry, Demchak has earned the nickname "prince of darkness."

In 2002, Demchak first joined PNC as chief financial officer. At that time he worked alongside the then CEO, Jim Rohr. Three years later, he was promoted to head of the company’s Corporate & Institutional Banking, in charge of PNC's middle market and large corporate businesses, capital markets, real estate finance, equity management and leasing. In 2009, Demchak became Senior Vice Chairman and shortly thereafter head of PNC Businesses.

William S. Demchak was elected president in April 2012, then chief executive officer in April 2013 and finally chairman in April 2014. In this capacity he is responsible for all of PNC’s businesses, including corporate and institutional banking, retail banking, mortgage banking and the Asset Management Group.

His total calculated compensation for the 2014 fiscal year was $11,337,904.

In 2009, Financial Times reporter Gillian Tett named Demchak as head of the team at JP Morgan whose financial innovations later played a role in the 2008 financial crisis. Tett described how the team developed new securitization techniques for "turbocharging the market." In particular, the team realised that SPV (special purpose vehicles) would not have to be fully funded. When the concept was taken up by less cautious banks, it would create "consequences that are currently rocking the planet."

== Personal life ==
Demchak was born and raised in Pittsburgh and still lives there today. He says there is "nowhere else I’d want to raise my family." He is married to Debbie, and they have three children together.

He formerly sat on the Regulatory Management Committee of The Financial Services Roundtable, the Supervisory Board of The Clearing House, the Allegheny Conference on Community Development, Extra Mile Education Foundation, Pittsburgh Cultural Trust, the World Affairs Council of Pittsburgh, YMCA of Pittsburgh and the Greater Pittsburgh Council of the Boy Scouts of America, the latter of which he in the past, held the role of chairman.

== Philosophy ==
According to Demchak, one key ingredient to becoming a successful leader is to believe you can always be better. He advises potential leaders to: “learn from your failures, surround yourself with people who will challenge you. Ensure your vision is shared ‘clearly and often’ with your team. Remain grounded in your values so that you never forget who you serve or why you come to work.”

Of this specific work he has done and continues to do at PNC he says: “Unlike every bank in our position in history we’re not going to jump into capital markets.”
