= First Franklin =

First Franklin may refer to:

- The 1863 First Battle of Franklin in the American Civil War
- First Franklin Financial Corp., a mortgage lender
