= PNC Center (Troy, Michigan) =

High-rise office building in Michigan, US

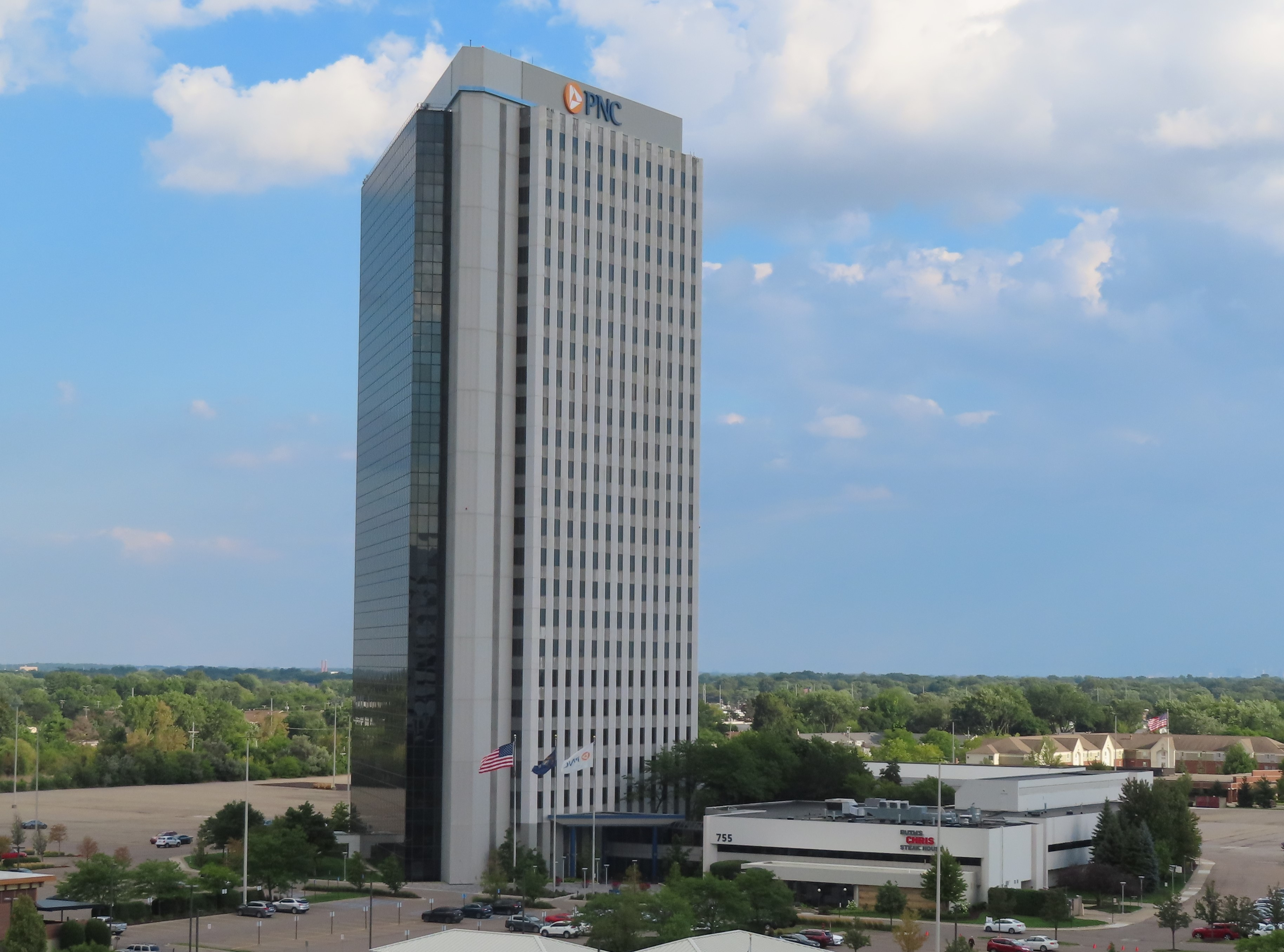
- Interactive map of the PNC Center area

General information
- Type: Office/retail
- Architectural style: International style
- Location: Troy, Michigan; United States
- Coordinates: 42°33′37″N 83°9′39″W
- Construction started: 1974
- Completed: 1975
- Owner: Friedman Real Estate

Height
- Antenna spire: 385 ft (117 m)
- Roof: 363 ft (111 m)
- Top floor: 346 ft (105 m)

Technical details
- Floor count: 25
- Lifts/elevators: 12

Design and construction
- Architect: Rossetti
- Developer: Kojaian

PNC Center, formerly National City Center and often still known by its original name, the Top of Troy, is a high-rise office building in Troy, Michigan. The complex consists of a 25-story triangular office tower and a two-floor atrium containing offices, retail, and a conference center. Completed in 1975, the International Style tower is the tallest building in Troy and among the tallest in Oakland County, standing 346 feet tall with 667,000 square feet of office space. PNC Financial Services maintains regional offices in the building as the major tenant.

The building can be easily accessed from Interstate 75, as it is located just west of the interchange (exit 69) with Big Beaver Road. The PNC Center can be seen for miles from much of the Metro Detroit area. There is a Ruth's Chris Steak House on the first floor, as well as a cafeteria known as Friends Café.

== See also ==
- Architecture of metropolitan Detroit
- Metro Detroit
- Tourism in metropolitan Detroit
