= First Franklin Financial Corp. =

Mortgage lender

- Company type: Private
- Industry: Financial services
- Founded: 1981
- Headquarters: San Jose, California, United States
- Area served: United States

First Franklin Financial Corp., not to be confused with 1st Franklin Financial Corporation, was a San Jose, California-based home mortgage lender that specialized in subprime loans. It had been owned by two of the biggest casualties of the subprime mortgage crisis, National City Corp. in Cleveland and Merrill Lynch. (National City was acquired by PNC Financial Services in October 2008 and Merrill Lynch was acquired by Bank of America in September 2008, both in hastily arranged shotgun marriages.)

== History ==
First Franklin was founded in 1981 in San Jose, California, US, to serve the prime credit market, but in 1994 it switched to serve the nonprime lending market. (One of the co-founders of the company was Bill Dallas, who served as its chairman, CEO and chairman emeritus until 2003, and who subsequently bought OwnIt Mortgage Solutions, which was 20% owned by Merrill Lynch. OwnIt filed Chapter 11 bankruptcy in December 2006.)

In 1994, the company was purchased by DLJ Merchant Banking Partners, a unit of Donaldson, Lufkin & Jenrette. In 1999 First Franklin was purchased by National City Corp. from a subsidiary of Bank of America for $266 million (~$458 million in 2023). By 2003, the company helped National City become the sixth largest mortgage lender in the country. In December 2006, First Franklin was sold to Merrill Lynch for $1.3 billion (~$1.89 billion in 2023), at a time when the shakeout in the subprime mortgage lending market had started to begin. Merrill Lynch acquired the company with the intent to create a pipeline of loans that it could package into mortgage-backed securities.

During the fourth quarter of 2006, First Franklin ranked as the fifth largest subprime lender in the country. On March 5, 2008, the company halted loan originations. The next month Merrill Lynch alleged that National City had misrepresented the condition of the company.
