= PNC Center (Cleveland) =

Skyscraper in Cleveland, Ohio

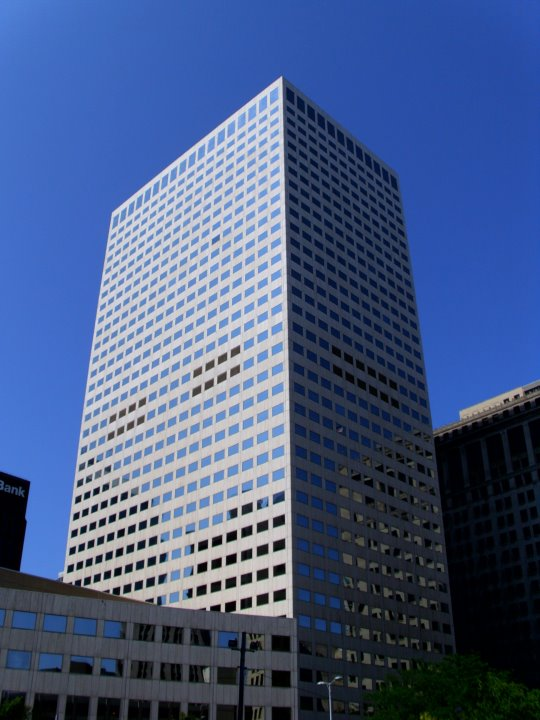
- PNC Center in Cleveland, Ohio
- Interactive map of the PNC Center area
- Former names: National City Center

General information
- Status: Completed
- Type: Skyscraper
- Architectural style: Modernism
- Classification: Office building
- Location: Nine-Twelve District, 1900 East 9th Street, Cleveland, Ohio, United States
- Coordinates: 41°30′02.1″N 81°41′16.1″W
- Named for: PNC Financial Services
- Construction started: 1978
- Completed: 1980
- Cost: $60 million

Height
- Architectural: 410.10 feet (125.00 m)
- Tip: 410.10 feet (125.00 m)
- Roof: 410.10 feet (125.00 m)

Technical details
- Floor count: 38 (35 above and 3 below)
- Lifts/elevators: 10
- Grounds: 492,664 square feet (45,770.0 m^{2})

Design and construction
- Architecture firm: Skidmore, Owings & Merrill
- Developer: Oliver Tyrone Corp.
- Structural engineer: Skidmore, Owings & Merrill
- Main contractor: Turner Construction

Other information
- Parking: 650-spot underground parking garage

PNC Center (formerly National City Center) is a skyscraper located in downtown Cleveland, Ohio at the northwest corner of Euclid Avenue and East 9th Street. The building has 35 stories and rises to a height of 410 feet (120 m), and was designed by Skidmore, Owings and Merrill. Construction on the building was finished in 1980. It served as the headquarters for the now defunct National City Corporation, and is now the Cleveland–area offices for PNC Financial Services.

== History ==
In 1975, National City Bank had many of its office functions scattered in Downtown Cleveland. National City almost had moved from Downtown Cleveland to a suburban location but opted to remain in Downtown Cleveland.

In 1977, National City announced plans for a new corporate headquarters in Downtown Cleveland. The cost was set at $50 million. Tax abatement, then a new form of financing, was used in its construction. In 1976, then Cleveland Mayor Ralph Perk brought NYC's idea to Cleveland. In 1977, National City Bank became the first Cleveland company and project to use tax abatement.

The site of National City was a complex one. The site had the old Bond Clothing Store complex (1947–49) and before that was the Hickox Building (1874–1947). There was an adult movie house that showed X-rated movies named the Roxy. These buildings were demolished in 1978 and construction began for the tower.

The National City Bank Tower rises from a seven–foot pad of concrete. The tower itself was not built with steel, instead it became Cleveland's tallest reinforced concrete structure. A floor was poured and jacked up 1 floor a week. The skin of the National City Bank Tower is a White Travertine Marble. During the day, National City Bank is whitish in color. At night, National City is bathed in light. During October, it is bathed in pink light for National Breast Cancer month which National City Bank sponsors research in.

When the Tower opened in 1980, National City occupied the tower as its own. Other tenants include KPMG, and several law firms, including Baker Hostetler.

A kinetic sculpture by George Rickey named Triple L Excentric Gyratory III sits outside the building.

In August 2009, PNC Financial Services replaced the National City sign atop of the building with its own, following the acquisition of National City by PNC in late 2008.

== See also ==
- List of tallest buildings in Cleveland
