= Marquette Savings Bank =

- Industry: Finance
- Founded: 1908
- Headquarters: Erie, Pennsylvania, United States
- Products: Financial services
- Website: https://www.marquettesavings.com

Marquette Savings Bank is a bank headquartered in Erie, Pennsylvania, United States. It was established in 1908 by a consortium of 38 local businessman, under the name of Marquette Building and Loan Association. Marketed as "Erie's only hometown bank," Marquette has maintained its local appeal, despite now [when?] having 12 branches in the region.

Marquette was honored by the global publication, The Economist, in the November 30, 2013, issue. The Economist praised Marquette for its performance during the 2008 financial crisis (in which it grew, rather than shrank). This article also discussed the change in Marquette's policy to sell its mortgages, rather than hold them to maturity, due to regulatory concerns.
