= Jim Rohr =

American banker

Personal details
- Born: October 18, 1948 (age 77) Cleveland, Ohio, U.S.
- Party: Republican
- Education: University of Notre Dame (BA); Ohio State University (MBA)

James E. Rohr (born October 18, 1948) is former chairman of PNC Financial Services Group (commonly known as PNC Bank) and former CEO. Rohr was CEO from May 2000 to April 2013 and as chairman from May 2001 to April 2014, both times taking over for Tom O'Brien. He was the chairman of the Carnegie Mellon University Board of Trustees until the start of the 2021 Academic year.

== Early life ==
Rohr was the grandson of an Alsatian (then Germany) immigrant to America, a cook in a hotel, who married the hotel's Irish laundress and opened his own restaurant in Cleveland, Ohio. Rohr's father, also a Cleveland restaurateur died when Rohr was still in grade school. Rohr graduated from Cleveland's Saint Ignatius High School and from the University of Notre Dame in 1970 with a B.A. Two years later, in 1972, Rohr earned an MBA degree from Ohio State University. Rohr's wife, Sharon, is from Chagrin Falls.

== Professional life ==
Prior to becoming Chairman & CEO of PNC, Rohr had spent his entire 28-year professional life at PNC-affiliated or predecessor companies. As CEO, Rohr managed a major accounting scandal that plagued PNC soon after he assumed leadership of the banking firm. By shifting $762 million in underperforming assets and loans to accounts that were kept off the corporation's balance sheet, PNC was forced to restate its 2001 earnings.

The first few years in an executive role at PNC were turbulent for Rohr. PNC's stock price lost roughly half of its overall value throughout 2001 and at shareholders' meetings during that time, shareholders began to demand that Rohr resign from his position.

In the wake of that scandal, Rohr led an overhaul of PNC's risk management systems that would ultimately help position PNC well for the 2008 financial crisis to come, and his reforms helped boost the performance of PNC's stock. By 2003, PNC was in acquisition mode, picking up United National Bancorp, expanding its presence in Eastern Pennsylvania and Central New Jersey. In the first half of 2004, PNC's net income rose 41 percent compared to the same part of 2003. At the end of 2004, PNC's assets were nearly $80 billion. A year later, in 2005, PNC earned $1.3 billion (or $4.65 per share), the highest annual earnings figure in the corporation's history.

Also in 2005, Rohr engineered PNC's acquisition of Riggs National Corp., parent company of Riggs National Bank. The company's assets increased to nearly $92 billion with the addition of Riggs. The acquisition was the beginning of a series of purchases that would dramatically increase PNC's size and bring it deep into the U.S. Southeast.

In 2006, PNC and Rohr have received high marks for their decision to sell a 49.8 percent stake of the money manager firm BlackRock to Merrill Lynch in 2006. The deal valued PNC's 70 percent stake at $5.6 billion, compared to the $240 million PNC, under O'Brien had paid for the same stake in 1995.

In 2007, PNC acquired Mercantile Bankshares Corporation, headquartered in Baltimore, adding 240 branches, primarily in Maryland, Delaware and the District of Columbia. In 2007 it also announced agreements to purchase two other banks. In 2008 PNC gained another 33 branches when it closed the acquisition of Yardville National Bancorp in New Jersey, and immediately after closed on its acquisition of Sterling Financial Corporation, with 67 branches in Pennsylvania, Maryland and Delaware.

Rohr's positive performance as Chairman & CEO earned him much praise and acclaim, including the 2007 American Banker's Banker of the Year Award.

At the height of the 2008 U.S. financial crisis, Rohr oversaw PNC's acquisition of struggling National City Corporation. The transaction effectively doubled the size of PNC and briefly made PNC one of the five largest U.S. banks. Importantly, it expanded PNC's retail banking footprint to the Mississippi River in the West and to Florida in the South, making it a truly "super-regional" bank. A category in which it would repeatedly be ranked by Fortune magazine as one of the "Most Admired Companies in America." Two years later, The Banker magazine of London named PNC "Bank of the Year in the U.S." for 2010.

In 2011 PNC agreed to purchase 19 Florida branches of BankAtlantic Bancorp, and by 2012 he had closed on the acquisition of a much bigger franchise, the 426 U.S. branches of the Royal Bank of Canada, collectively known as RBC Bank (USA).

In February 2013, Rohr announced to the PNC board that he wanted to vacate his CEO role after the 2013 annual shareholders meeting and then retire from the company altogether in 2014.

Rohr was named to the General Electric Co. board of directors in September 2013.

In April 2014, Rohr vacated his role as chairman, retiring after 42 years with PNC, including 13 years as CEO. Upon his retirement, PNC's assets exceeded $320 billion, or four times what they had been at the beginning of Rohr's building phase.

Beyond Rohr's legacy as a builder of the franchise, Rohr was well known for his community leadership in his adopted home, PNC's headquarters city of Pittsburgh, and as the driving force behind the creation of PNC's signature philanthropic effort, PNC Grow Up Great.

Among Rohr's many contributions to the community were his chairmanship of the Pittsburgh Cultural Trust, which transformed Pittsburgh's former red-light district into a showcase cultural district featuring the already existing home of the Pittsburgh Symphony Orchestra, Heinz Hall, the opera house known as the Benedum Theater, the smaller Byham theater concert venue, and the O'Reilly theater. Rohr helped connect these to the city's central business district by building Three PNC Plaza to house the bank's growing staff on a formerly blighted block adjacent to PNC's corporate headquarters. Completed in 2010, it featured the city's first Fairmont Hotel and was opposite a park PNC developed on the site.

In 2008, Rohr chaired Pittsburgh's 250th Anniversary celebration, bringing national attention to the city. In 2009, as chairman of the Allegheny Council on Community Development, Rohr helped Pittsburgh lure the international G-20 conference. For his contributions to the city, Pittsburgh Magazine named him "Pittsburgher of the Year" in 2012. And in 2015, with the completion of PNC's new corporate headquarters at Fifth Avenue and Wood Street, the city named a portion of Wood Street, the corner where PNC had been headquartered for more than 160 years, "Jim Rohr Way."

Beyond Pittsburgh, Rohr enhanced the lives of millions of children through PNC Grow Up Great. Long a close associate of Fred Rogers of Mr. Rogers Neighborhood fame, Rohr was intensely aware of the importance of early childhood development. In 2004, he worked with the PNC Foundation to create Grow Up Great, a 10-year, $100 million early childhood learning initiative intended to help prepare underserved children from birth to age 5 for school and life.

== Compensation ==
While CEO of PNC Financial Services Group in 2008, James E. Rohr earned a total compensation of $8,549,098, which included a base salary of $1,000,000, no cash bonus, stocks granted of $3,185,000, and options granted of $4,132,000.

== Criticism ==
The Pittsburgh Tribune-Review newspaper began running "The Jim Rohr Box." The editorial section bearing Rohr's name chided the PNC Chairman for accepting a $48 million public subsidy to help fund the construction of the new Three PNC Plaza.

== Personal wealth ==
Forbes magazine's profile of Rohr shows his annual salary at PNC totaling $950,000 with PNC stock options valued at $11.4 million.
