= Flagstar Bank (1987–2022) =

Former American bank

Flagstar Bancorp, Inc.

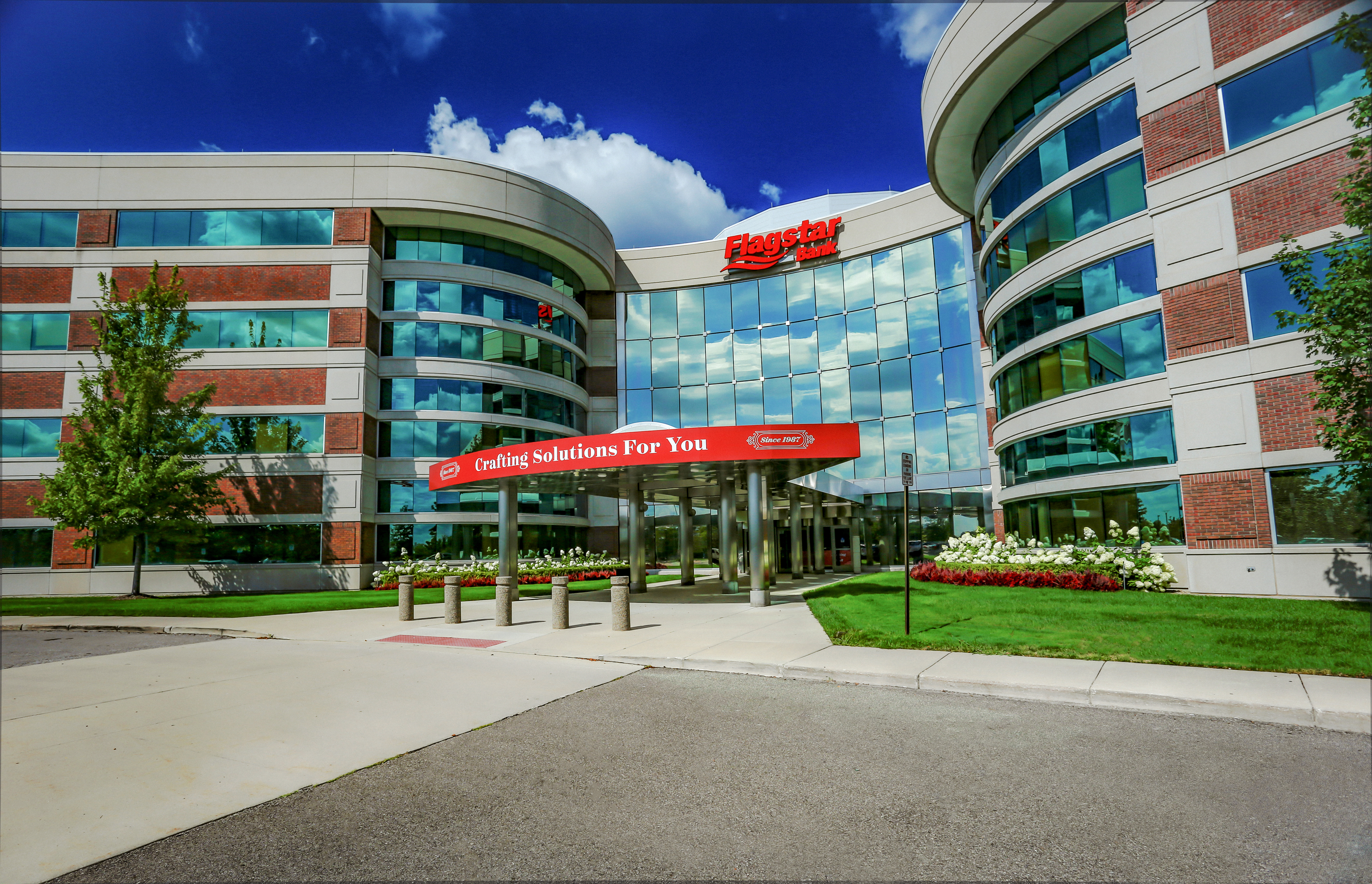
- Former Flagstar Bank headquarters in Troy, Michigan
- Company type: Subsidiary
- Industry: Financial services
- Founded: Flagstar Bancorp, Inc. - 1993; 33 years ago; (as FSSB Holding Corporation); Flagstar Bank, FSB - 1987; 39 years ago; (as First Security Savings Bank, FSB)
- Defunct: December 1, 2022; 3 years ago
- Fate: Acquired by New York Community Bank
- Successor: Flagstar Bank
- Headquarters: Troy, Michigan, United States
- Number of locations: 395 branches
- Key people: John D. Lewis (Chairman); Alessandro DiNello (President and CEO)
- Website: www.flagstar.com

Flagstar Bank was an American commercial bank headquartered in Troy, Michigan. The bank was founded in 1987 and operated as a consumer and commercial bank, mortgage lender, and offered financial services. Flagstar Bancorp, Inc. was acquired by New York Community Bancorp, Inc. on December 1, 2022. New York Community Bancorp subsequently rebranded all of its branches under the Flagstar name and changed its name to Flagstar Financial in 2024. In a corporate restructuring in 2025 Flagstar Financial changed its name to Flagstar Bank, N.A.

== History ==
First Security Savings Bank was founded as a federal savings bank in 1987. The chairman of the bank was Thomas J. Hammond. The initial branch focused on funding regional retail and wholesale mortgage operations. A bank holding company, FSSB Holding Corporation was established in 1993. The following year, the company acquired Security Savings Bank, based in Jackson, Michigan. Two years later in 1996, the company adopted its current name, Flagstar Bank.

In 1997, the company became a public company via an initial public offering. It moved its stock listing from the NASDAQ to the New York Stock Exchange in 2001.

During the 2008 financial crisis, the company raised $1.6 billion in new capital with investments from MP Thrift Investments L.P., the Troubled Asset Relief Program (TARP), and public offerings. The bank repaid all of the funds it received under TARP in August 2016.

Flagstar effected 1:10 reverse stock splits in 2010 and 2012 to maintain its New York Stock Exchange listing. The U.S. Department of Treasury sold its preferred stock of Flagstar to private investors in 2013.

In May 2013, Flagstar paid a $110 million settlement to MBIA. In June 2013, Flagstar reached a $105 million settlement with Assured Guaranty related to its RMBS. Flagstar paid a $93.5 million settlement to Fannie Mae in November 2011, and $8.9 million to Freddie Mac regarding its RMBS mortgage repurchase obligations in December 2013. In September 2014, Flagstar agreed to pay $37.5 million to the Consumer Financial Protection Bureau.

In 2013, the company sold a $1.3 billion commercial loan portfolio to CIT Group. Flagstar Bank was the jersey sponsor of the Detroit Pistons of the National Basketball Association for the 2017–18 NBA season.

In 2018, the bank acquired 8 branches in San Bernardino County, California from Desert Community Bank. These branches continued to operate under the Desert Community Bank name until 2024. The company also acquired a mortgage warehouse loan portfolio from Santander Bank. During that same year, Flagstar also acquired 52 Wells Fargo branches in Indiana, Michigan, and Ohio, as well as four in Wisconsin. However, numerous issues plagued Flagstar during the transfer, several of which were caused by its main website experiencing technical glitches. Flagstar waived fees, added staff and published an email address where customers could send concerns to alleviate issues. The bank stated that most issues had been resolved by the end of the week.

In 2019, the company initiated a dividend.

=== Community ===
In 2016, Flagstar Bank announced plans for a $10 million, 5-year economic development program for Pontiac, Michigan. The initiative is aimed at helping revitalize the Oakland County city. The program includes $5 million for home mortgages including a customized home loan product for Pontiac residents, $2.5 million for small businesses and start-ups, $1.5 million for the previously announced naming rights of the Flagstar Strand Theatre for the Performing Arts along with an investment of $1 million for financial literacy in the community.

=== Management ===
Thomas J. Hammond, founder of Flagstar, served as chairman of Flagstar Bank and Flagstar Bancorp. Mark Hammond became president of the bank in 1995 and CEO in 2002.

In 2009, former CEO of Sovereign Bancorp Joseph P. Campanelli was named chairman, president, and CEO of Flagstar Bank and Flagstar Bancorp.

In 2012, Michael J. Tierney, previously executive vice president and managing director of personal financial services at Flagstar, became president and CEO of the organizations. John D. Lewis, former vice chairman and director of Comerica, was named chairman. Alessandro P. DiNello became president, CEO and director of the organizations in 2013.

== Acquisition by New York Community Bank ==
On April 26, 2021, New York Community Bancorp, Inc. (NYCB) announced the acquisition of Flagstar in an all stock strategic merger. The acquisition was completed on December 1, 2022. New York Community Bank eventually rebranded itself under the Flagstar name.

== Controversy ==
On February 24, 2012, the United States Department of Justice filed a complaint in the United States District Court for the Southern District of New York against the bank, alleging that it had improperly approved thousands of residential home mortgage loans for government insurance. In February 2013, a U.S. District court in Manhattan found that the bank had materially breached contracts specifying the quality and characteristics of loans to be packaged into the securities.
