= Fairness opinion =

Evaluation of the terms of a transaction

Example Fairness Opinions

SEC filings relating to the 2009 merger of Merck & Co., Inc. and Schering-Plough Corporation:

- J.P. Morgan
- Goldman Sachs
- Morgan Stanley

A fairness opinion is a professional evaluation by an investment bank or other third party as to whether the terms of a merger, acquisition, buyback, spin-off, or privatization are fair. It is rendered for a fee. They are typically issued when a public company is being sold, merged or divested of all or a substantial division of their business. They can also be required in private transactions not involving a company that is traded on a public exchange, as well as in circumstances other than mergers, such as a corporation exchanging debt for equity. Some of the specific functions of a fairness opinion are to aid in decision-making, mitigate risk, and enhance communication.

== Controversy ==
Controversy in financial and management circles surrounds the question of the objectivity of fairness opinions, as one aspect of the duty of care in the fairness of a transaction. A potential exists for a conflict of interest when an entity rendering an opinion may benefit from the transaction either directly or indirectly. Directors and officers of the companies also may have an interest in the outcome of the proposed transaction. In response, in the United States, the Financial Industry Regulatory Authority (then the National Association of Securities Dealers) issued its Rule 2290 to require disclosure by its members to minimize abuses; this was approved in 2007 by the Securities and Exchange Commission.

== Equity and fairness ==
In the United States, in the context of stockholder lawsuits, typically relating to the sale or merger of a public company, the Delaware Court of Chancery has required sufficient disclosures be made to a board of directors and shareholders to “provide a balanced, truthful account of all matters” and said “When a document ventures into certain subjects, it must do so in a manner that is materially complete and unbiased by the omission of material facts.” In a Memorandum Opinion in the CheckFree/Fiserv merger Chancellor Chandler underlined that the earlier In re Pure Resources Court had established the proper frame of analysis for disclosure of financial data: “Stockholders are entitled to a fair summary of the substantive work performed by the investment bankers upon whose advice the recommendations of their board as to how to vote on a merger or tender rely.” According to the certification hypothesis fairness opinions may also serve the interest of the shareholders by mitigating informational asymmetries in corporate transactions.
