= List of corporations in Pittsburgh =

This is a list of major corporations headquartered in the metropolitan area of Pittsburgh, Pennsylvania.

== Fortune 500 companies based in Pittsburgh ==
There are ten Fortune 500 companies headquartered or co-headquartered in the Pittsburgh metropolitan area on the 2026 list.

- 136 PNC Financial Services (financial)
- 184 Kraft Heinz (food; co-headquartered with Chicago)
- 195 Wesco International (industrial)
- 258 Dick's Sporting Goods (retail/consumer goods)
- 284 PPG Industries (industrial)
- 318 Viatris (pharmaceuticals)
- 344 Alcoa (metals/mining)
- 389 Wabtec (industrial)
- 458 EQT Corporation (energy)
- 471 Howmet Aerospace (industrial)

== Other public companies ==
- American Eagle Outfitters (retail/consumer goods)
- Ampco Pittsburgh (industrial)
- Ansys (technology)
- Atlas Energy (energy)
- Aurora (technology)
- Calgon Carbon (industrial)
- Consol Energy (energy)
- Duolingo (technology)
- DynaVox (technology)
- Federated Investors (financial)
- F.N.B. Corporation (financial)
- Kennametal (industrial)
- Koppers (industrial)
- Mine Safety Appliances (industrial)
- Viatris (medical)

== Large private companies ==
- 4moms (juvenile/robotics consumer goods)
- 84 Lumber (retail/consumer goods)
- American Bridge Company (industrial)
- Arconic (industrial)
- Argo AI (technology)
- Buchanan, Ingersoll & Rooney (law firm)
- Centimark (industrial contractor)
- Eat'n Park (retail/consumer goods)
- Farmers and Merchants Bank of Western Pennsylvania
- Giant Eagle (retail/consumer goods)
- Guru.com
- K&L Gates (law firm)
- NexTier Bank
- Pitt Ohio Express (services)
- Reed Smith (law firm)
- Vector Security (commercial/residential security)
- Vocelli Pizza (retail/consumer goods)
- Wexford Health Sources (healthcare)
- Zambelli Fireworks

== Nonprofit corporations ==
- Allegheny Health Network (healthcare)
- Duquesne University (education)
- Highmark Health (third largest integrated health care delivery and financing system in the nation; parent company of Highmark Inc. and Allegheny Health Network)
- Highmark Inc. (healthcare)
- SAE International (professional association)
- University of Pittsburgh Medical Center (healthcare)
- The Washington Hospital (healthcare)

== Other major companies ==
- American Thermoplastic Company (industrial)
- Ariba (formerly Freemarkets)
- Astrobotic (aerospace)
- Bookminders (services)
- Covestro (chemicals)
- Dollar Bank (financial)
- DQE (energy)
- Eaton (electrical)
- FedEx Ground (services)
- Fox Learning Systems (e-learning)
- HarbisonWalker International (refractory)
- Heyl & Patterson Inc. (industrial)
- Industrial Scientific (gas detection)
- LANXESS (industrial)
- Laurel Networks
- Medrad Inc. (medical)
- Mine Safety Appliances (industrial)
- Niche (technology)
- Oxford Development Company
- Reich Publishing and Marketing
- StarKist (retail/consumer goods)
