= MNB =

MNB may refer to:

- MNB (TV channel), a Mongolian public television channel
- Merchants National Bank (disambiguation), several U.S. banks
- Monday Night Baseball, a live game telecast of Major League Baseball on NBC, ABC and ESPN
- Mongolian National Broadcaster, a public service broadcaster in Mongolia
- Moody National Bank, a bank in Galveston, Texas
- Belgian National Movement, a World War II Belgian Resistance group
- Hungarian National Bank (Magyar Nemzeti Bank), the Hungarian name of the central bank of Hungary
- Menadione Nicotinamide Bisulfite, a synthetic chemical compound – see Menadione
- MnB, manganese boride

== See also ==
- Wikipedia:Mentorship noticeboard, sometimes referred to by the shortcut WP:MNB
