= Logos and uniforms of the Pittsburgh Steelers =

Steelers sports logos and uniforms

The Pittsburgh Steelers of the National Football League were founded in 1933. Over the course of the team's history, the team has had several logos while wearing virtually the same uniforms over the years, with subtle changes made to give the uniforms an updated look. The team colors, uniforms, and logo are often ranked as being among the best in the NFL.

== Colors ==
The Steelers have used black and gold as their colors since the club's inception, the lone exception being the 1943 season when they merged with the Philadelphia Eagles and formed the "Steagles"; the team's colors at that time were green and white as a result of wearing Eagles uniforms. Black and gold are the colors of the city's official flag which are the colors of the city's namesake Sir William Pitt. The colors black and gold are also representative of the two ingredients to create steel, coal and iron ore. Originally, the team wore gold colored helmets and black jerseys. Unique to Pittsburgh, the Steelers' black and gold colors are now shared by all major professional teams in the city, including the Pittsburgh Pirates in baseball and the Pittsburgh Penguins in ice hockey.

== Logo ==
The Steelers (then known as the Pittsburgh Pirates) first logo was the city coat of arms.

Current logo of the Steelers.

The Steelers have had several logos in the early part of their history, among them including the crest of Pittsburgh, a football with Pittsburgh's then-smoggy skyline, as well as a construction worker hanging onto a chain holding a pennant. Another logo showed the worker punting a football on a steel beam. It is rumored that mascot Steely McBeam was based on the latter logo.

Since 1963, the team has used a stencil typeface for its script logo. Since then, many team-related typefaces have used stencil font.

The team's current primary logo was introduced in November 1962 versus the Washington Redskins and is based on the flag originally designed by Pittsburgh's U.S. Steel and now owned by the American Iron and Steel Institute (AISI). Ironically, it was Robert Sexton, an employee out of the Pittsburgh office of Cleveland-based Republic Steel, that suggested the Steelers adopt the industry logo. It consists of the word "Steel" surrounded by three (hypocycloids of four cusps). The original meanings behind the hypocycloids were, "Steel lightens your work, brightens your leisure, and widens your world." Later, the colors came to represent the ingredients used in the steel-making process: yellow for coal, orange for iron ore, and blue for scrap steel. While the formal Steelmark logo contains only the word "Steel," the team was given permission to add "ers" in 1963 after a petition against AISI.

While the logo still resembles the original Steelmark logo, the team has made subtle changes over the years in order to own a trademark on the logo, most notably making the three hypocycloids thicker in shape and changing the orange hypocyloid to red. The Steelmark logo itself has actually been heavily redesigned since then, using two variants, one of which uses a more modern design and uses three shades of blue for the hypocycloids while another one used concurrently has a strong resemblance to the recycling symbol. One alternate variation the team used in the 1980s—though rarely used today—combined the logo with the team's signature stencil-script typeface, replacing the regular "Steelers" typeface used with the team's longtime script logo.

== Helmets ==
The Steelers are the only NFL team that puts its logo on only one side of the helmet (the right side). Longtime field and equipment manager Jack Hart was instructed to do this by Art Rooney as a test to see how the logo appeared on the gold helmets; however, its popularity led the team to leave it that way permanently. Since then, several college football teams such as Michigan State have followed the Steelers approach at one point or another and had their logo on only one side of the helmet. At the end of the 1962 season, they switched to black helmets for the 1962 Playoff Bowl to make it stand out more, and adopted the black helmets full time from the 1963 season onward. In 1977, the Steelers switched facemask colors from gray to black.

Another feature of the helmet is that a player's uniform number appears on both the front and back (the Steelers are one of only two teams in the NFL to do so, with the other team being the New York Giants). Just like the Giants, the Steelers have the two digit helmet numbers located to the left and right of the center stripe on both the front and back of the helmets. Also just like the Giants, the Steelers have the one digit helmet number located on the center stripe on both the front and back of the helmets. The numbers traditionally do not appear on the front of the helmet during the exhibition season, and also do not appear on the front of the throwback helmets.

The Steelers re-introduced gold helmets in 2007, paired with their 1962 throwback uniforms. The gold helmets featured the current Steelers logo rather than the original version of the Steelmark that was worn in 1962, and were also paired with black facemasks. These helmets continued to be used through the 2011 season. When the Steelers replaced the 1962 throwback with the 1933 horizontally-striped "bumblebee" throwbacks in 2012, the team retired the gold helmets.

== Uniforms ==
=== Early years ===
The Steelers have made only a few changes to their jerseys over the years. Originally, the team had vertically-striped jerseys that resembled prison uniforms at the time, with some variations having the city of Pittsburgh crest on the front, a la NHL uniforms. The team would later wear these uniforms as throwbacks in 1994. A horizontally-striped uniform with the uniform numbers placed on rectangular panels also appeared in the 1933 season; this design was worn as a throwback from 2012 until 2016.

The team adopted more standard NFL uniforms in 1936 and added Northwestern striping to the sleeves, and with the team finishing 0.500 for the first time in team history that season (at 6–6), the stripes have largely remained on the uniforms since. The striping pattern is named for Northwestern University, the college that is believed to have originated the pattern.

One exception that the stripes were omitted prior to the 1960s was from the aforementioned "Steagles" season because the team wore the Eagles uniforms as a cost-saving measure. The Eagles' jerseys at the time were green with white shoulders and no stripes. The Rooneys have acknowledged that because the combined team wore the Eagles uniforms that year, it is the only time in team history that the colors were something other than black & gold.

=== Two white jerseys ===
Due to uniform experimentation in the 1960s, on two separate occasions the team's stripes were omitted. The first time came in 1962, when the Steelers began to wear two types of white jerseys, one of which featured a gold diamond on the sleeves in place of the stripes, with the "TV numbers" situated on the diamonds. These jerseys were primarily worn in home games when the team didn't wear their black jerseys, since the NFL at the time was encouraging teams to wear white jerseys so fans could see the team colors of their opponents.

The other jersey featured gold sleeves and a black version of the stripes, and were worn in road games when the home team elected to wear their colored jerseys. The team continued this way through the 1965 season.

=== Caped Crusaders ===
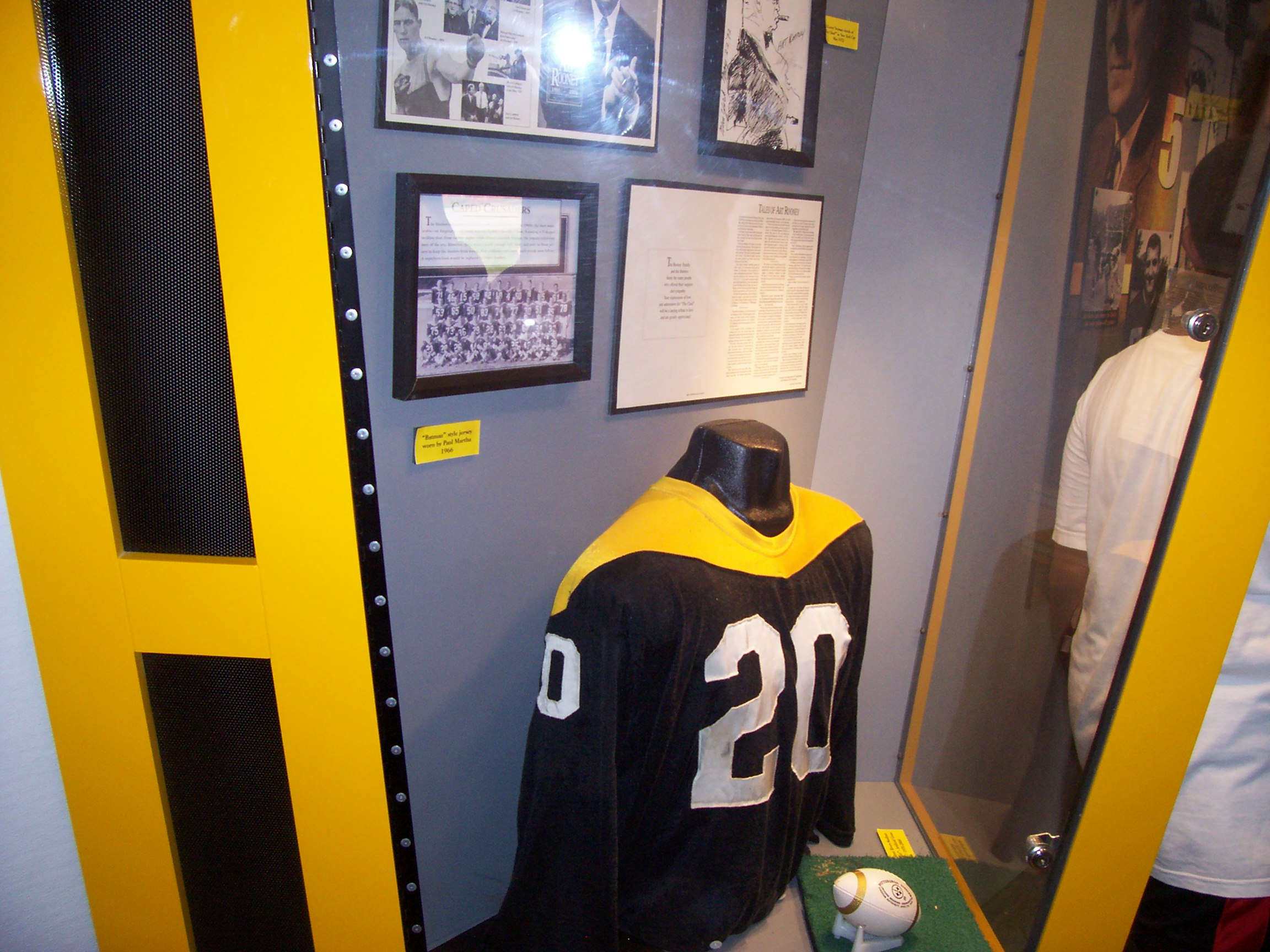
The Steelers' "Batman"-style uniforms the team experimented with in 1966-1967.

Perhaps the most infamous uniforms the team has ever worn came in 1966, when the team experimented with the "Batman"-themed uniforms, named as such because they were similar to the Batman outfits Adam West wore on the popular TV series. The jersey had no stripes on either the black or white jerseys and had a gold triangle-like diamond covering the shoulders.

Although they have been commonly called the "Batman" uniforms, Dan Rooney later made public his reasoning behind the uniforms. With his father still running the team and the Vince Lombardi-led Green Bay Packers being the class of the NFL, the younger Rooney (who still had a much smaller role with the team at the time) didn't want to follow the lead of other NFL teams trying to copy the Packers and wanted the Steelers to have a unique look. Coinciding with this was the development of the Golden Triangle in the city of Pittsburgh in the 1960s, so Rooney decided to give the uniforms a connection to the growing downtown district with the gold triangle-like diamond.

Although both Rooney and NFL Films's Steve Sabol liked the look (Sabol mentioned that you could easily tell when the Steelers played), the players didn't, adding that they looked like clowns or Batman, which is likely where the "Batman" rumors began. Due to primitive washing techniques at the time (as well as NFL teams frequently reusing the uniforms, unlike today where current supplier Nike gives teams new uniforms every game), the Steelers had trouble washing the uniforms because the gold triangle faded easily. Rooney was even asked on a radio show in Dallas when the team was playing the Cowboys on October 30, 1966 if the team was wearing the uniforms for Halloween.

The uniforms were retired after two seasons. The team has mentioned publicly as recently as 2007 that they will never wear them in a game again. However, in 2008, the team began to sell customized versions of the jerseys on their official Web site.

Fittingly, several Steelers players appear in the 2012 Batman film The Dark Knight Rises in a scene which was filmed in Heinz Field.

=== Modern classics ===
After just two years with the "Batman" uniforms, the current uniform designs were introduced in 1968. The design was a modernized version of the pre-1966 black design and consists of gold pants and either black jerseys or white jerseys, except for the 1970 and 1971 seasons when the Steelers wore white pants with their white jerseys; the TV numbers were uniquely positioned between the sleeve and shoulder, at the apex of the shoulder. After a two-year hiatus, the Northwestern-style stripes returned for good, with the black jerseys getting white stripes in the two gaps of the gold stripes while the white jerseys got black outlines on the gold stripes, essentially making the stripe pattern the same on both jerseys. Both variations have been heavily used in team apparel.

Although the stripes initially went all the way around the sleeves, since the 2000 season they now stop in the middle of the jersey; this is due to football jerseys in general shortening the sleeves to reduce holding calls. As the sleeves continued to become shorter, and especially with the NFL's changeover to Nike as their league-wide uniform provider in the 2012 season, the full stripe pattern is no longer worn by most players, as the stripes are truncated at the bottom of the wide gold stripe. One exception to this trend is quarterback Ben Roethlisberger, who, like a number of other starting quarterbacks, has continued to wear longer sleeves with the full striping pattern.

The helmet is solid black with a gold central stripe and small white player numbers on the forehead. Last names were added to the jerseys in 1970, as part of a new NFL mandate resulting from the AFL-NFL merger (the AFL teams had last names on the back of their jerseys). The names have always been gold with black trim on the white uniforms, except from 1970–71 when it didn't have black trim, and during the 1997 season when it was colored black. On the black uniforms, the player names were in gold without any additional trim. In 1997, the team switched to rounded numbers on the jersey to match the number font (Futura Condensed) on the helmets (though during the preseason and Week 1, player names remained in a block lettering), and a Steelers logo was added to the left side of the jersey; the TV numbers moved fully to the shoulder pad with these changes.

The Steelers are often praised and recognized with their uniforms due to their traditional style while other teams such as the Arizona Cardinals, Atlanta Falcons, Denver Broncos and Minnesota Vikings have introduced more radical uniforms in recent years. When Reebok signed a contract to become the exclusive uniform supplier to the NFL in 2000 (replacing Nike, whom the Steelers had from 1997-2000, and had Starter before Nike) Reebok had announced that all NFL teams would be changing their uniforms for the 2002 NFL season, when Reebok's contract took effect. Dan Rooney, one of the league's most influential owners, stated several times in public that the Steelers would NOT be changing their uniforms despite Reebok stating otherwise. Eventually, Reebok rescinded its proposal due to several owners protesting after taking Rooney's lead. (The Buffalo Bills and Seattle Seahawks redesigned their uniforms for 2002 anyway.) Aside from introducing throwbacks in 2007, the Steelers did not make any changes to their uniforms during Reebok's time as the NFL's uniform supplier. When the league switched to Nike in 2012, the Steelers again stood pat on their uniforms, although they did replace their throwback design.

In 1979, the team gave the Big Ten's Iowa Hawkeyes permission to use the Steelers uniform designs, since both teams had the same color scheme. Aside from Iowa using its Tigerhawk logo as well as continuing to use the block numbers that the Steelers themselves replaced with the rounder numbers in 1997, the two uniform sets remain identical today.

On October 25, 2026, the Steelers debuted a new uniform variation against the New Orleans Saints in the NFL's first game in Paris. The design featured the primary white uniform paired with the black Color Rush pants. This marked the first time the Steelers wore black pants with a primary uniform and the first time since 1971 that the Steelers did not wear gold pants with the white uniform.

=== Black at home ===
The Steelers are one of a dwindling number of NFL franchises that strictly wears its team color jerseys at home, always opting for black. They are the only ones in the AFC North to practice this. The Cleveland Browns have traditionally had on again/off again periods of wearing white at home, while the Baltimore Ravens and Cincinnati Bengals, like some other NFL teams, wear white in their home opener before wearing their darker jerseys in their remaining home games. The Steelers last wore white at home on a regular basis in 1969, Chuck Noll's first season as coach and the last year the team played in Pitt Stadium.

Because of the team's unofficial policy of always wearing their black jerseys in home games, the team gained some notoriety when, as the designated "home" team for Super Bowl XL, the team elected to wear their white jerseys, becoming just the third NFL team to elect to wear white as the "home" team in the Super Bowl (Denver would later elect to wear white as the home team in Super Bowl 50 and New England would elect to wear white as the home team in Super Bowl LII). But while the other two teams that have elected to wear white as the "home" team in the Super Bowl (Dallas in Super Bowl XIII and Super Bowl XXVII, and Washington in Super Bowl XVII) traditionally wear white at home, a variety of reasons were rumored as to why the Steelers elected to wear white in Super Bowl XL. Reasons included the fact that the team wore white in all three playoff victories that year (all on the road) to former head coach Bill Cowher's comments that since it wasn't at Heinz Field, it was a road game (a statement contradicted by the fact that ten years earlier in Super Bowl XXX, Cowher's squad was the "home team" and chose to wear their black jerseys away from Three Rivers Stadium, where they had played both playoff games–and did so against the Cowboys, whose opponents will often wear white at home simply to force them to use their "unlucky" blue jerseys). The game took place in Detroit, which is only a five-hour drive from Pittsburgh and with the league preferring to have the Super Bowl in subtropical or Mediterranean climates or in domed/retractable roof stadiums due to the winter weather, is likely the closest the Steelers would have to a home game in a Super Bowl in the foreseeable future. (Not surprisingly, there were also an overwhelming number of Steelers fans at the game compared to the number of supporters of their opponent, the Seattle Seahawks. One ESPN.com columnist suggested that Steelers fans outnumbered Seahawks fans by a ratio of 25 to 1.) Having been the Cowboys' opponent in XIII, the Steelers are the only team to have worn both white jerseys for a "home" Super Bowl and colored jerseys for an "away" one.

=== Throwback uniforms ===
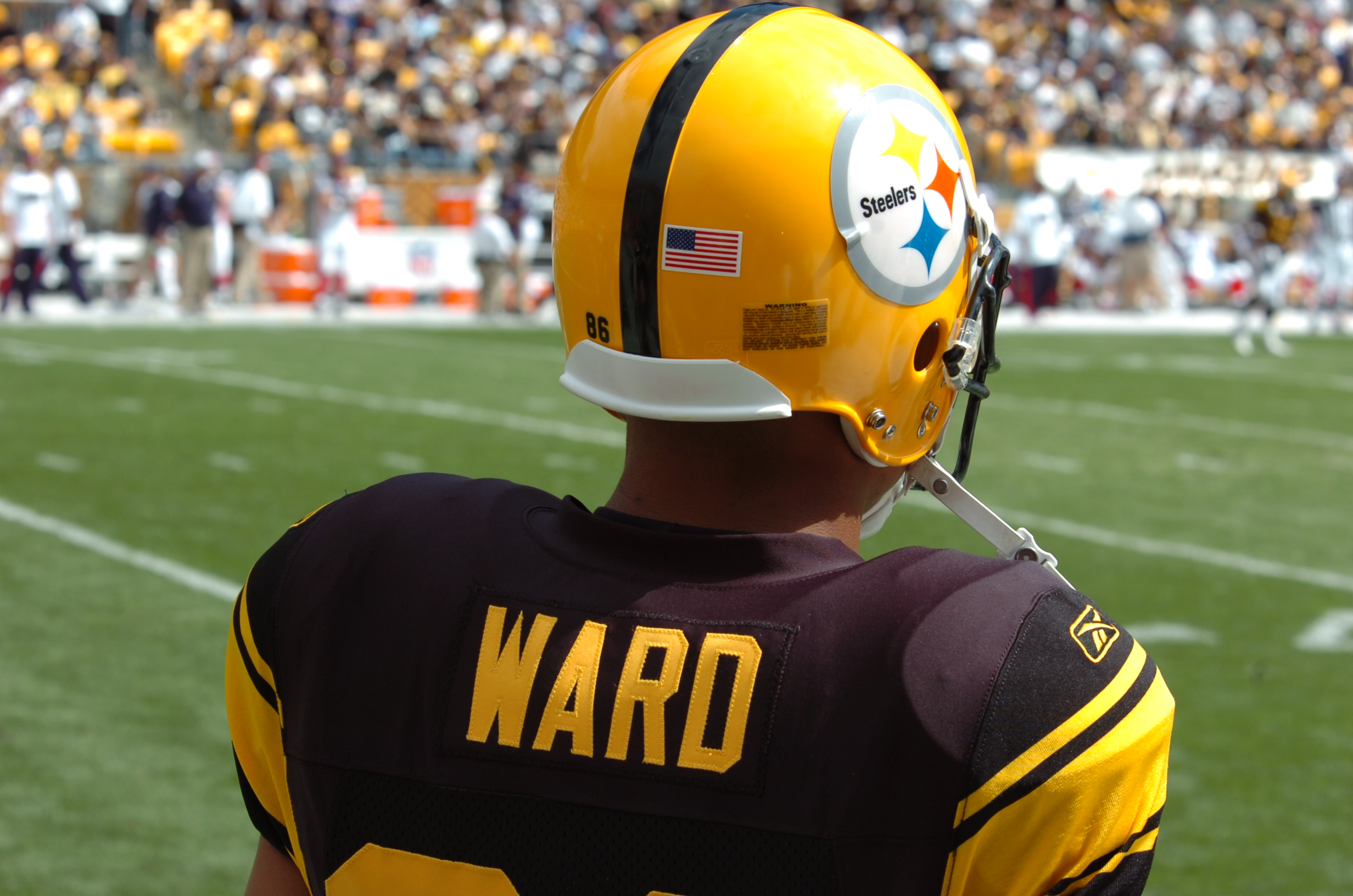
Hines Ward wearing the Steelers 75th anniversary uniform in 2007.

At a press conference on April 27, 2007, it was announced that the Steelers would wear a throwback uniform for two home games during the 2007 season, as part of the celebration of the Steelers' 75th Season. They were worn for the Steelers' home opener against the Buffalo Bills on September 16 and again during the Monday Night Football game on November 5 against the Baltimore Ravens. Both games resulted in victories. The jersey is black with the numbers, names and stripes all in gold and it also contains a 75th Season logo on the right side of the upper chest part of the jersey. The jersey is considered to be from the 1960 season. The pants are white with a single gold stripe running down the length of the outside of each leg, surrounded by thinner black stripes on either side of the gold stripe. The helmets are gold with the Steelers logo on the right side and a single black stripe running down the center from front to back. The helmet was worn during the 1962 season, which was the first year that the present Steelers logo began to appear on their helmets. The only two differences are that the logo on the original helmet read 'Steel', whereas Steelers appears on the helmet that the team wore for the two games in 2007 and that the face mask on this version of the helmet is black, whereas the original face mask color on the gold helmet was gray. The throwbacks, minus the "75th season" patch, are now officially the team's alternate uniform as of the 2008 season, and are usually worn for games that honor the team's alumni.

Since their introduction in 2007, the Steelers have worn the throwbacks the NFL maximum of twice per year, with the team's annual home matchup against the rival Baltimore Ravens receiving one of the allotments each year. The other matchups have included the Buffalo Bills in 2007, the New York Giants in 2008 (the first loss in the throwbacks), and the San Diego Chargers in 2009 (Sunday night contest).

2010 saw the team sporting the throwback uniforms at the October 17 game against the Cleveland Browns, and for the November 14, Sunday Night Football game against the New England Patriots (their second loss). In 2011, they wore throwback uniforms for the November 6 home game against the Baltimore Ravens (which was their third loss in the throwbacks) and December 8 home game against the Cleveland Browns.

The throwback gold helmets have often been worn in practice in addition to the regular black helmets, a highly unusual move among NFL teams whose throwbacks use a different helmet than their current design.

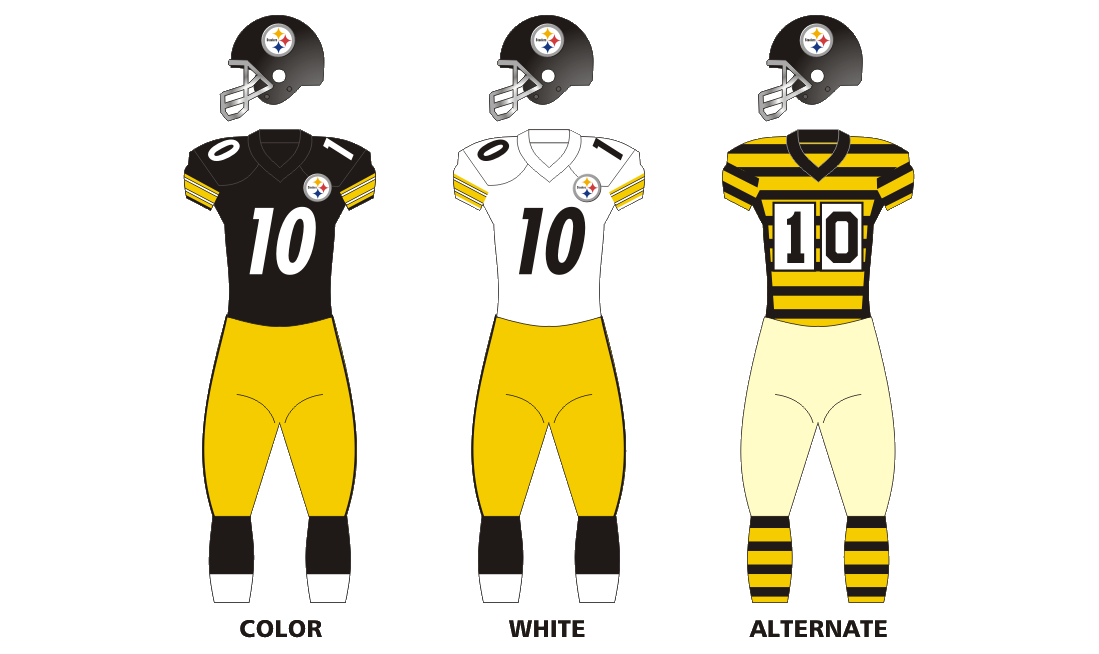
The uniforms worn by the Steelers in 2012–13, including the throwback kit honoring the 1934 team.

For the 2012 season, as part of their 80th anniversary, the Steelers wore horizontally-striped throwback uniforms inspired by the 1934 Pittsburgh Pirates football team. The Steelers wore the throwbacks for their October 28 game against the Washington Redskins and for their November 18 game against the Baltimore Ravens. The uniforms have drawn major media attention. USA Today said that the Steelers looked like "bumblebee[s] in a Depression-era chain gang." 65% of respondents to an ESPN poll said they hated the throwback uniforms. NBC Sports' Pro Football Talk blog said the 2012 throwback uniform "ranks among the worst ever fashioned for any NFL team." The throwbacks were officially retired after the 2016 season.

For the 2018 season, the Steelers will wear throwback black uniforms based on the design worn by the Steel Curtain teams of the 1970s. It is similar to their current uniforms but without the Steelers logo on the left chest and using block lettering and numbers instead of Futura Condensed.

Prior to the 2025 season, the Steelers unveiled throwback gold uniforms based on the 1933 set. The front of the uniform featured black chest stripes with black-trimmed white block numbers, and the back featured black block letter names and numbers. Beige pants complete the look. The Steelers would wear a gold alternate helmet and gray facemasks with the set, the design of which mirrors the primary black helmet and is similar to the previous throwback gold helmet they wore from 2007 to 2011. This set replaced the Steel Curtain throwbacks in the team's rotation.

=== Color Rush ===
As part of the NFL Color Rush program, the Steelers debuted all-black uniforms in the 2016 season. The jerseys feature the same stripes as the standard black jersey, with the only change being that the white stripes are now also gold. The numerals are in gold as well, although in the traditional block font instead of Futura Condensed. The pants are black with a thick gold stripe, the reverse of their normal gold pants. Solid black socks and shoes completed the uniform, although some players were permitted to wear gold shoes. The uniforms debuted on Christmas against the Baltimore Ravens; as the Ravens had already played a Color Rush game in an all-purple uniform in week 10, they wore their regular white uniforms against the Steelers.
