= Browns–Steelers rivalry =

National Football League rivalry

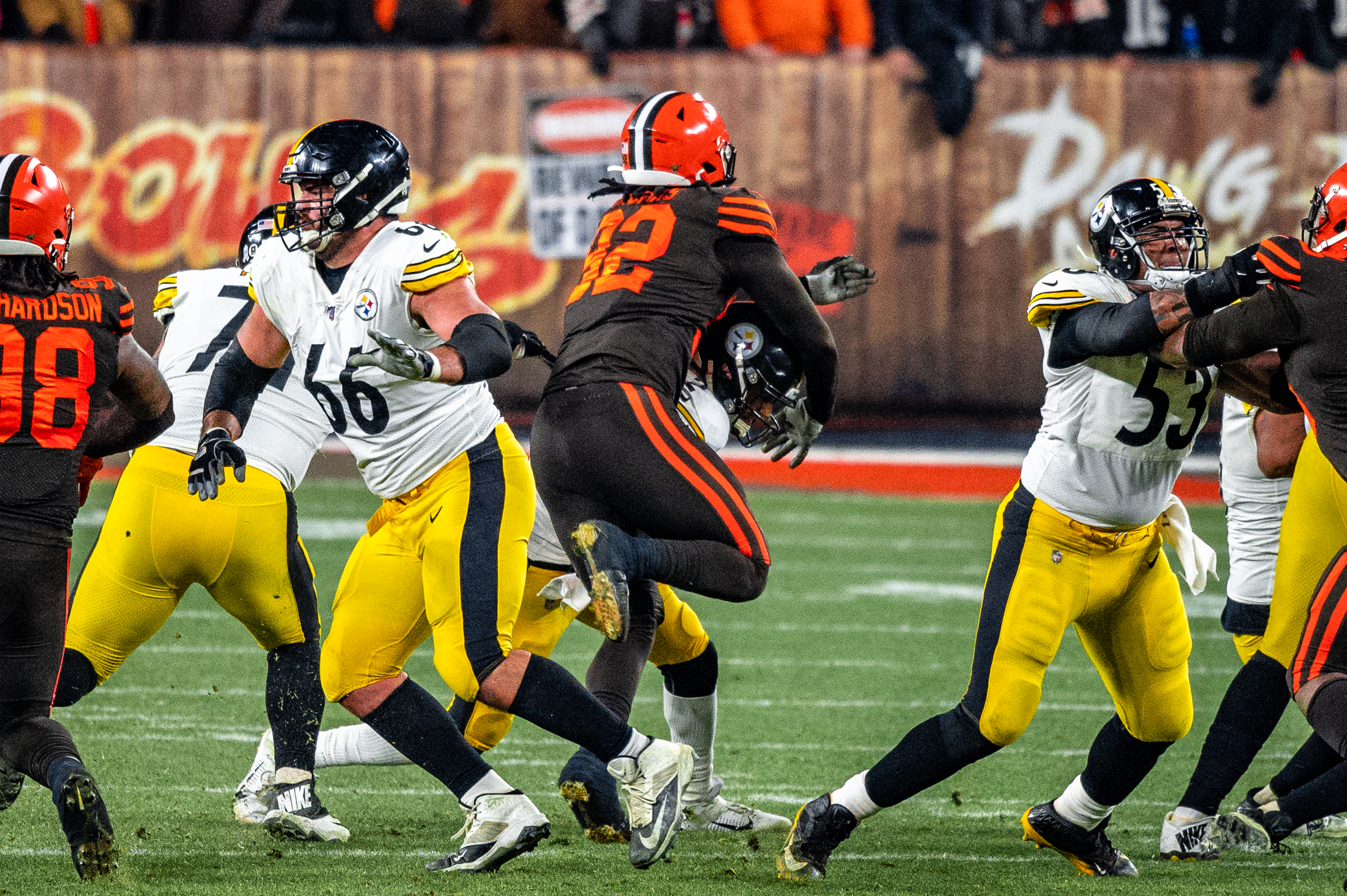
- Browns and Steelers face off during the 2019 season.

- Cleveland Browns Pittsburgh Steelers
- Location: Cleveland, Pittsburgh
- First meeting: October 7, 1950; Browns 30, Steelers 17
- Latest meeting: November 1, 2026; Steelers 27, Browns 6
- Next meeting: 2027
- Stadiums: Browns: Huntington Bank Field; Steelers: Acrisure Stadium

Statistics
- Total meetings: 151
- All-time series: Steelers: 84–66–1
- Regular season series: Steelers: 82–65–1
- Postseason results: Steelers: 2–1
- Largest victory: Browns: 51–0 (1989); Steelers: 43–0 (1999)
- Most points scored: Browns: 51 (1989); Steelers: 55 (1954)
- Longest win streak: Browns: 8 (1950–1953); Steelers: 12 (2003–2009)
- Current win streak: Steelers: 1 (2026–present)

Post-season history
- 1994 AFC Divisional: Steelers won: 29–9; 2002 AFC Wild Card: Steelers won: 36–33; 2020 AFC Wild Card: Browns won: 48–37

The Browns–Steelers rivalry or Turnpike Rivalry is a National Football League (NFL) rivalry between the Cleveland Browns and Pittsburgh Steelers.

The rivalry originated during the 1950 season, following the AAFC–NFL merger, which placed the Browns and Steelers in the same conference, the NFL American Conference (later referred to as the NFL Eastern Conference starting in the 1953 season). This alignment led to the teams facing each other twice each year. Since the AFL–NFL merger, the Browns and Steelers have been competing in the AFC North (previously known as the AFC Central until 2001).

The rivalry, which has featured 149 meetings, is the oldest and most frequently played matchup in the American Football Conference. The two divisional opponents share a natural rivalry due to geographic proximity and similarities between the cities. It is sometimes referred to as the Turnpike Rivalry or Turnpike War because travel between the two cities primarily involves the Ohio Turnpike and Pennsylvania Turnpike.

The Steelers lead the overall series, 84–66–1. The two teams have met three times in the playoffs, with the Steelers holding a 2–1 advantage.

== Similarities between the cities ==
The rivalry was primarily fueled by the close proximity between the two cities, as Cleveland and Pittsburgh are roughly 135 miles apart. Many fans make the two-hour drive by car to away games. The city of Youngstown, Ohio is roughly located halfway between the two cities, is split roughly 50/50 between the two teams and was within the 75-mile blackout radius for both teams before blackouts were abolished in the mid-2010s. The Youngstown television market is a secondary market for both teams because of its proximity to both cities, meaning that road games for both the Browns and Steelers are by NFL rule to be shown in Youngstown. Both teams have such strong fan bases that neither typically had blackout issues, although the final two games of the 1995 season were blacked out in Cleveland (the last two prior to the original Browns' move to Baltimore). WKBN-TV broadcasts both teams; when they play at the same time the station chooses one game, and gets many calls from disappointed fans of the other team.

=== Businesses ===
In recent times, Pittsburgh-area businesses have entered the Cleveland market by buying out local Cleveland-area competitors such as Giant Eagle, Dollar Bank, Howard Hanna Realty, and PNC Financial Services acquisition of National City Corp. Among other reasons, some Clevelanders didn't like the idea of a Pittsburgh-based bank buying National City because of the rivalry between the Browns and Steelers. PNC and Giant Eagle are official team sponsors for both teams. In addition, natural expansion has occurred with companies with Western Pennsylvania roots with Vocelli Pizza and Altoona-based Sheetz making successful expansions into the Cleveland market.

Conversely, Eaton Corporation was founded in Cleveland and has long had significant operations in Pittsburgh. Forest City Enterprises owns billions of dollars of Pittsburgh-area real estate. The Cleveland branch of the Federal Reserve includes Pittsburgh in its territory. Cleveland-based Sherwin-Williams has locations throughout Pittsburgh and nationally is one of the top competitors to Pittsburgh-based PPG Industries. Two former Cleveland-based businesses, Picway Shoes and Revco, had locations throughout Pittsburgh before being bought out by Payless ShoeSource in 1994 and CVS/pharmacy in 1998, respectively. National City Bank itself had expanded into Pittsburgh in 1995 through its acquisition of Integra Bank and actually caused antitrust problems when PNC bought National City in 2008, being forced to divest 61 National City branches in Western Pennsylvania. Although First Niagara Bank ultimately bought 57 of the branches, Cleveland-based KeyBank was one of the banks that was considering buying the branches and expanding into Pittsburgh; KeyBank would later acquire First Niagara outright.

Republic Steel, which was based in Cleveland, was the company that suggested to the Steelers that the team use the Steelmark logo on its helmets in 1962. The logo later became the Steelers primary trademark, and is arguably better known with the logo than the steel industry itself.

=== Coaches and players ===
The teams have also had various prominent players and coaches with roots in the other team. For instance, former Steelers head coach Chuck Noll is from Cleveland and played guard and linebacker for the Browns. His successor as head coach, Bill Cowher, also played linebacker and special teams for the Browns, and was an assistant coach for the Browns from 1985 to 1988. Cowher was born and raised in Crafton, a suburb of Pittsburgh. Former Browns head coach Marty Schottenheimer is a native of Pittsburgh area suburb Canonsburg, along with his brother Kurt Schottenheimer, who was the Browns special teams coach from 1987 to 1988. Another Browns head coach, Bud Carson also had as his hometown a northern suburb of Pittsburgh and was a longtime Steelers coordinator under Chuck Noll.

Steelers Hall of Famer Jack Lambert is a native Ohioan and attended Kent State University, as did Akron, Ohio native James Harrison. Steelers quarterback Ben Roethlisberger hails from Findlay, Ohio. Former punter Chris Gardocki played for three years for the Steelers, including the Super Bowl XL championship team, after playing five seasons with the Browns from 1999 to 2003. Former Steelers Offensive coordinator Bruce Arians held the same position with the Browns from 2001 to 2003.

== History of the rivalry ==
=== 1950s and 1960s: Browns dominance ===
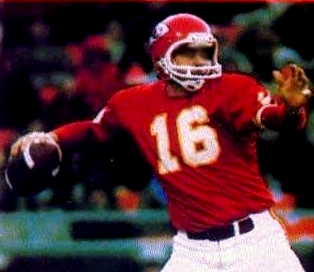
Prior to guiding the Kansas City Chiefs to their first Super Bowl championship, Hall of Fame quarterback Len Dawson had stints with the Steelers and the Browns.

The Browns and Steelers first met in 1950, the Browns' first NFL season after dominating the All-America Football Conference. The Browns continued their dominance in the NFL as they appeared in six straight NFL Championship games from 1950 to 1955, winning the NFL title in 1950, 1954, and 1955. During that time the Steelers were among the NFL's worst teams.

The Browns won the first meeting on October 7, 1950, 30–17 as they forced six Steelers turnovers. Later that season in Cleveland, the Browns won in a blowout, 45–7. The Browns would win the first eight meetings before the Steelers would finally beat their rivals in 1954. The Steelers won 55–27 in a game in which Ray Matthews had 150 receiving yards and three touchdowns.

The Browns continued their dominance throughout the late 1950s and 1960s, marked by several strong rushing performances by Browns Hall of Fame running back Jim Brown. The Browns would hold a 31–9 series advantage through the first two decades of the rivalry.

=== 1970s: Steelers Super Bowl run ===
After the NFL merged with the former American Football League (AFL) in 1970, the Browns and Steelers were placed in the Central division of the newly formed American Football Conference (AFC). The Browns and Steelers, along with the Baltimore Colts were placed in the AFC with the former members of the AFL to allow each conference to have the same number of teams. The NFL tried to move the Steelers to the new conference, but then-Steelers owner Art Rooney initially refused. However, Rooney reconsidered after then-Browns owner Art Modell volunteered the Browns to shift to the AFC, partly because the NFL had offered $3 million as an incentive to move but also because of the potential for an intrastate rivalry with the AFL's Cincinnati Bengals. The financial boost combined with the prospect of losing his most lucrative division rival quickly persuaded Rooney to join Modell in the AFC in order to continue their own rivalry, although the team did lose its in-state rivalry with the Philadelphia Eagles as a result.

In the 1970s the Steelers began to even the playing field with the Browns, led by head coach Chuck Noll, a Cleveland native and former Browns linebacker. By then, the rivalry between the two clubs was more hostile and personal, as evident in the 1976 matchup at Cleveland Municipal Stadium, when Joe "Turkey" Jones tackled Terry Bradshaw with a pile-driving sack. Bradshaw suffered a neck injury from the play, and the footage of the sack has since become immortalized in NFL Films as part of the rivalry.

The Steelers opened Three Rivers Stadium in 1970 and won their first sixteen meetings with the Browns at that venue. During the 1970s, the teams each won five of the ten meetings in Cleveland. The Steelers ended the 1970s winning seven straight meetings and capped the decade by winning Super Bowls XIII and XIV to go along with their Super Bowl wins earlier in the decade (IX and X).

=== 1980s and 1990s ===
The teams exchanged victories throughout the 1980s. In the first meeting of the decade, the Browns, led by quarterback Brian Sipe, overcame a 12-point deficit to stun the Steelers 27–26. The Steelers would defeat the Browns later that year in another close game. The 1980 Browns, nicknamed the "Kardiac Kids", would make the playoffs that year for the first time since 1972 after Pittsburgh dominated the AFC Central with four Super Bowl wins in the late 1970s.

The Browns ended a 16-game losing streak at Three Rivers Stadium with a 27–24 victory in 1986. This was the first of four straight Browns wins in Pittsburgh from 1986 to 1989. In the 1989 season opener, the Browns defeated the Steelers 51–0 in Pittsburgh. This is the largest margin of victory in the rivalry and the worst loss in Steelers franchise history.

While the two exchanged victories in the '70s and '80s, by the 1990s the Steelers became the dominant team in the rivalry. Since the Browns' last series sweep in 1988, the Steelers achieved an overwhelming 39–11 mark against the Browns, enough that in 2007, the Steelers took over the lead in the all-time series (which they currently lead at 82–64–1) for the first time. This included six straight wins from 1993 to 1995 that featured a 29–9 win in the 1994 divisional playoff game, the first playoff meeting between the two rivals. During most of this time, Bill Cowher was head coach of the Steelers. Cowher, a native of the Pittsburgh suburb of Crafton, also played linebacker for the Browns (though unlike Noll, Cowher mostly played special teams), and also served as an assistant in Cleveland under Marty Schottenheimer, himself another Pittsburgh area native.

After the 1995 season, the rivalry took a brief hiatus due to the Browns relocation to Baltimore. When the league was voting on the Browns relocation, Steelers owner Dan Rooney was one of only two owners to vote against the move. In tribute of Cleveland losing the Browns, Steelers fans wore orange arm bands to the final game at Three Rivers Stadium as a sign of mutual respect and sorrow for losing a great rivalry. While Browns fans still consider the Steelers as their main rival, most Steelers fans consider their rivalry with the Baltimore Ravens the spiritual successor to this rivalry due to Art Modell moving the franchise to Baltimore and renaming them "Ravens". The consistently poor Browns' teams since their expansion in 1999, along with the one-sidedness of the rivalry since then is also a factor in the rivalry having diminished in the views of football fans.

=== 1999–2003: Browns rejoin the NFL ===
The name "Browns" returned to the NFL in 1999 attached to a new expansion team. They played their first game against the Steelers at the new Cleveland Browns Stadium. The Steelers dominated the game 43–0 in a game in which the new Browns could only gain two first downs. However, in the return fixture in Pittsburgh later that season, the new Browns would defeat the Steelers 16–15 on a last-second Phil Dawson field goal.

The Browns and Steelers would again split the series in 2000, with each team winning in their home stadium.

The two teams would meet in a 2002 wild card playoff game. Browns starting quarterback Tim Couch, however, was ruled out due to a broken leg he suffered in their regular season finale. As a result, backup QB Kelly Holcomb started. The Browns built a 24–7 lead in the third quarter, but the Steelers came back to win 36–33. In 2003, the Browns would win their first game at Heinz Field, defeating the Steelers 33–13. This was the Browns’ only win at Heinz Field until the 2020 playoffs.

=== 2004–2019: The Ben Roethlisberger era ===
The Steelers drafted QB Ben Roethlisberger, a native of Findlay, Ohio, in the first round of the 2004 NFL draft. Roethlisberger became the Steelers' starting quarterback in his rookie year and led the Steelers to three Super Bowl appearances, including wins in Super Bowls XL and XLIII. During Roethlisberger's tenure, the Steelers amassed a 29–6–1 record against the Browns including a 17–1 mark at home; at one point, Roethlisberger ironically held the record as the winningest quarterback at Cleveland Browns Stadium history despite having never suited up for the Browns. The Steelers made 11 playoff appearances including three trips to the Super Bowl and two Super Bowl titles, while the Browns only made one playoff appearance in this stretch.

In Week 11 of 2006, the Steelers managed to tie the series at 55 games apiece between them and the Browns. They stunned the Browns 24–20 after Browns QB Charlie Frye's Hail Mary fell incomplete. The loss also left the Browns to finish last place in the division behind the Steelers.

In Week 1 of 2007, the Steelers defeated the Browns 34–7 to take a 56–55 lead in the overall series. This was the first time the Steelers led the series and the Steelers have not given the lead up since. Later that season, the Steelers came back from down 21–6 to win 31–28. The two teams finished the season at 10–6, tied atop the AFC North. The Steelers won the head-to-head tiebreaker, while the Browns failed to earn a wild card spot after losing a tiebreaker to the Tennessee Titans.

On December 10, 2009, the Browns defeated the Steelers 13–6, ending a 12-game winning streak for the Steelers. This game is believed to be the coldest game in the history of the rivalry with a wind chill around −10 °F (−23 °C).

Roethlisberger continued his dominance of the Browns in the 2010s, going 12–1–1 against them in the decade. However, the majority of the games have been close and come down to the final minutes or one final play.

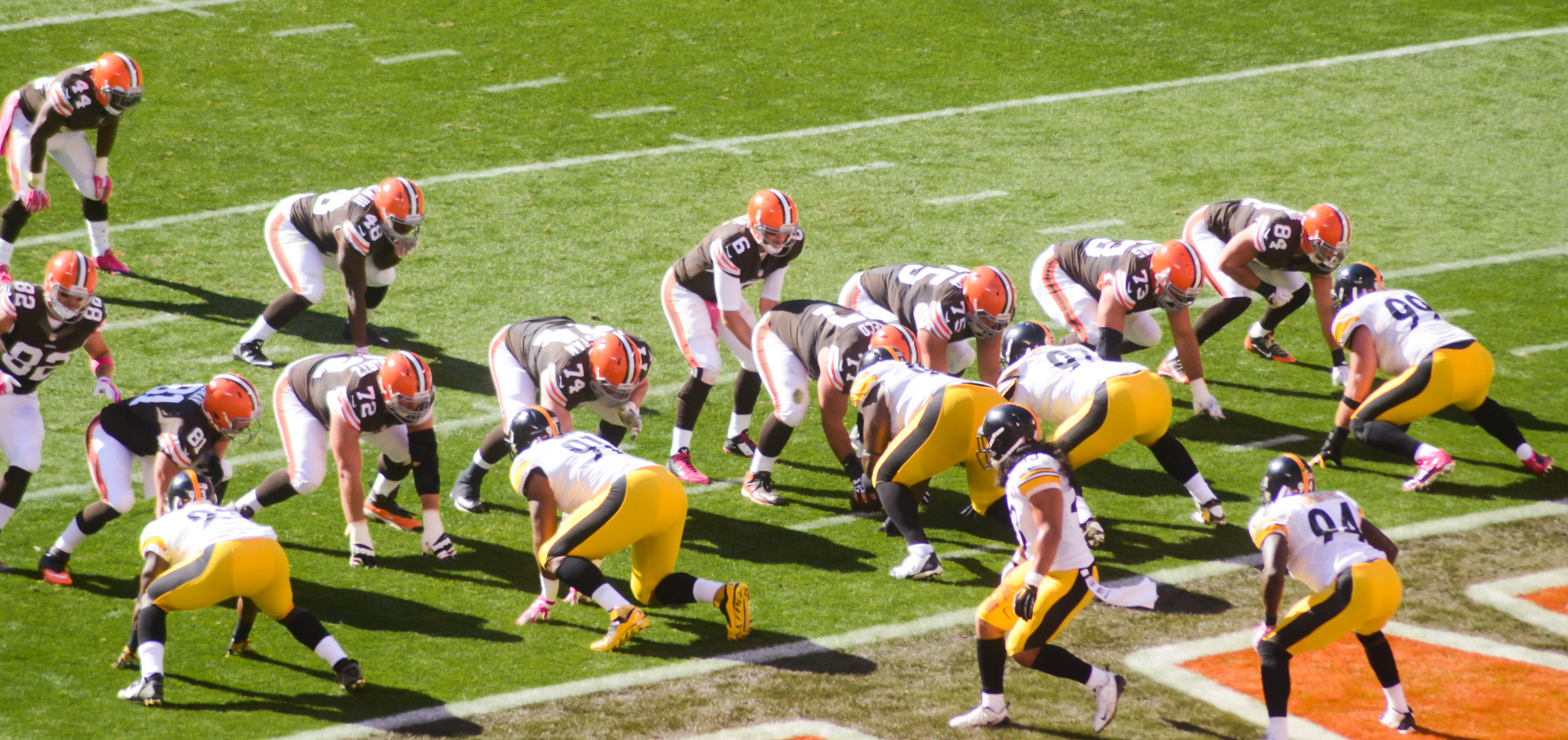
The Steelers and Browns face off in 2014 with Brian Hoyer under center for Cleveland.

In Week 5 of the 2014 season, the 2–2 Browns routed the 3–2 Steelers in a 31–10 victory in Cleveland after suffering a narrow 30–27 loss to Pittsburgh in the season opener. The Steelers scored early with a field goal and kept the Browns scoreless in the first quarter. The Browns would dominate from the second quarter onward, however, and this win would propel the Browns to an eventual 6–3 record atop the AFC North. However, injuries and rookie QB Johnny Manziel's poor play would doom the Browns’ season, where they would finish with a 7–9 record while the Steelers won the division. The Browns' struggles continued and the team reached rock bottom in 2016 and 2017, as they went 1–31 in those two seasons combined. In the Browns' 2017 season, the Steelers defeated them in the first and last games of their season, completing only the second 0–16 season in NFL history.

On September 9, 2018, the teams played to a 21–21 tie. This marked the first and only tie game in the history of the rivalry. The game saw the Steelers jump to a 21–7 lead, but the Browns mounted two successful drives to tie the game at 21–21 and send it to overtime. The Steelers committed 6 turnovers against a strong Browns defense, and Browns DE Myles Garrett was able to sack Roethlisberger three times in their first meeting. Going into overtime, Steelers kicker Chris Boswell missed a potential game-winning field goal. On a subsequent drive after a Browns 3-and-out, Roethlisberger had his 5th turnover of the game, a fumble recovered by Browns linebacker Joe Schobert. A field goal try by the Browns in the last seconds of overtime was blocked, resulting in the tie. The tie would come back to hurt the Steelers as they would finish 9–6–1, a half game behind the Baltimore Ravens for the AFC North title (had the Steelers won this game, they would have finished 10–6, tied with the Ravens, and would have won the tiebreaker). The Steelers missed the playoffs for the first time since 2013.

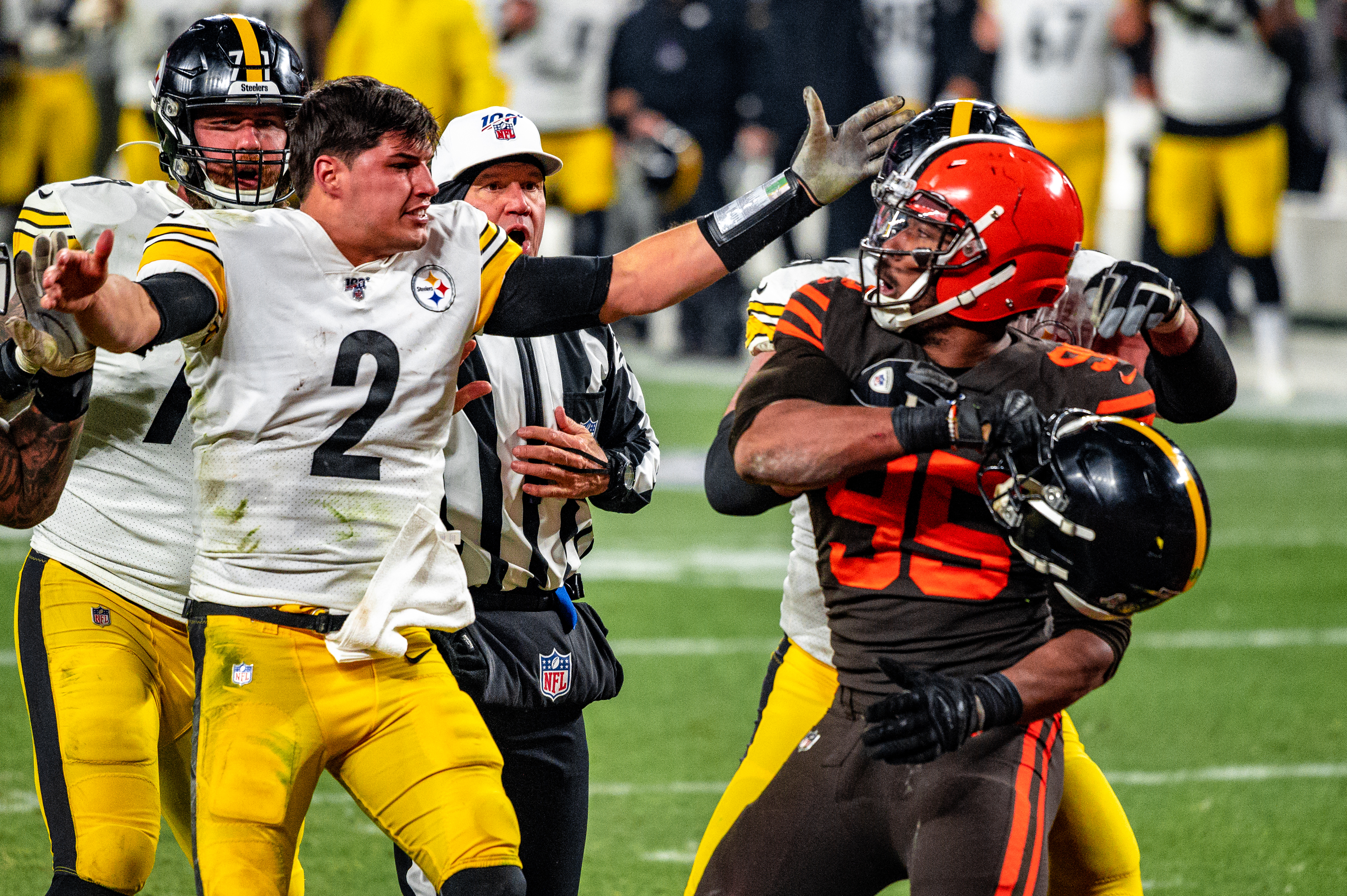
Rudolph (left) reacts immediately after being hit in the head by Garrett in 2019.

On November 14, 2019, Browns quarterback Baker Mayfield notched his first win over the Steelers with a 21–7 victory, the Browns’ first win in the series since 2014. However, in the final seconds of the game, a brawl broke out between the two teams. With eight seconds remaining in the game, Browns DE Myles Garrett tackled Steelers QB Mason Rudolph after the latter completed a screen pass to RB Trey Edmunds. Rudolph had choice words for Garrett and unsuccessfully tried to pull Garrett's helmet off. Garrett then ripped off Rudolph's helmet and used it to hit Rudolph in the head while being restrained by Steelers C Maurkice Pouncey and Steelers G David DeCastro. Pouncey then jumped into the brawl by punching and kicking Garrett in the head several times. Browns DT Larry Ogunjobi was also involved in the scuffle by pushing Rudolph to the ground. Garrett, Ogunjobi, and Pouncey were ejected from the game. Following the game, Garrett was suspended for 6 games while Pouncey and Ogunjobi received 2-game and 1-game suspensions, respectively. Garrett's suspension was the longest in NFL history for a single on-field transgression. On December 1, the teams met in Pittsburgh, in a game in which the winner would remain in the thick of the AFC wild card race and the loser would fall further behind. The Steelers, who had benched Rudolph in favor of third string Devlin Hodges, won 20–13 to improve to 7–5 while the Browns fell to 5–7, two games out of a playoff spot.

=== 2020–present: The rivalry fully returns ===
On January 3, 2021, the Browns entered Week 17 at home and would clinch a playoff spot with a win over the Steelers. The Steelers rested a few of their starters, with Rudolph starting as quarterback. The Browns won 24–22 despite a late Steelers rally; the Browns stopped a Pittsburgh two-point conversion attempt that would have tied the game. The win meant that the 11–5 Browns clinched the 6-seed and faced the Steelers in Pittsburgh for a rematch in the Wild Card Round. Pittsburgh fans took note, reigniting the Browns–Steelers rivalry in Pittsburgh.

Prior to the playoff game, Steelers wide receiver JuJu Smith-Schuster was quoted as saying "The Browns is [sic] the Browns," implying they were the "same old Browns" and calling them "nameless grey faces." Several Cleveland players took Smith-Schuster's comments personally. Despite losing several coaches, including head coach Kevin Stefanski due to COVID-19, the Browns forced five Steelers turnovers, led 28–0 in the first quarter, and won 48–37 to advance to the divisional round. This was the Browns' first win at Heinz Field since 2003 and their first ever playoff win against the Steelers.

The following season would be the last for quarterback Ben Roethlisberger as the Steelers would sweep the Browns, winning both games by a combined score of 41–24. The first victory was a 15–10 win in Cleveland on October 31, and the second was a 26–14 victory on January 3 at Heinz Field. After finishing with a disappointing 8–9 record to conclude the 2021 season, the Browns traded quarterback Baker Mayfield to the Carolina Panthers for a fifth-round draft pick.

== Season-by-season results ==
Cleveland Browns vs. Pittsburgh Steelers Season-by-Season Results
1950s (Browns, 16–4)

| Season | Season series | at Cleveland Browns | at Pittsburgh Steelers | Overall series | Notes |
|---|---|---|---|---|---|
| 1950 | Browns 2–0 | Browns; 45–7 | Browns; 30–17 | Browns; 2–0 | As a result of the AAFC–NFL merger, the Browns joined the NFL and were placed in the NFL American Conference (later renamed to NFL Eastern Conference in the 1953 season), resulting in two meetings annually with the Steelers. Browns win 1950 NFL Championship Game. |
| 1951 | Browns 2–0 | Browns; 17–0 | Browns; 28–0 | Browns; 4–0 | Browns lose 1951 NFL Championship Game. |
| 1952 | Browns 2–0 | Browns; 29–28 | Browns; 21–20 | Browns; 6–0 | In Pittsburgh, Browns overcame a 20–7 third quarter deficit. In Cleveland, Steelers nearly overcome a 29–7 deficit. Browns lose 1952 NFL Championship Game. |
| 1953 | Browns 2–0 | Browns; 34–16 | Browns; 20–16 | Browns; 8–0 | Browns win eight straight meetings (1950–1953). Browns lose 1953 NFL Championship Game. |
| 1954 | Tie 1–1 | Browns; 42–7 | Steelers; 55–27 | Browns; 9–1 | In Pittsburgh, Steelers score their most points in a game against the Browns. Browns win 1954 NFL Championship Game. |
| 1955 | Browns 2–0 | Browns; 41–14 | Browns; 30–7 | Browns; 11–1 | Browns win 1955 NFL Championship. |
| 1956 | Tie 1–1 | Steelers; 24–16 | Browns; 14–10 | Browns; 12–2 | |
| 1957 | Browns 2–0 | Browns; 24–0 | Browns; 23–12 | Browns; 14–2 | |
| 1958 | Browns 2–0 | Browns; 27–10 | Browns; 45–12 | Browns; 16–2 | In Pittsburgh, Browns force nine Steelers turnovers. |
| 1959 | Steelers 2–0 | Steelers; 21–20 | Steelers; 17–7 | Browns; 16–4 | |

1960s (Browns, 15–5)

| Season | Season series | at Cleveland Browns | at Pittsburgh Steelers | Overall series | Notes |
|---|---|---|---|---|---|
| 1960 | Tie 1–1 | Browns; 28–20 | Steelers; 14–10 | Browns; 17–5 | |
| 1961 | Tie 1–1 | Steelers; 17–13 | Browns; 30–28 | Browns; 18–6 | In Pittsburgh, Steelers' WR Buddy Dial finished with 235 receiving yards, setting a franchise record for most receiving yards in a game by a Steelers' player (broken by Plaxico Burress in 2002). |
| 1962 | Browns 2–0 | Browns; 35–14 | Browns; 41–14 | Browns; 20–6 | |
| 1963 | Tie 1–1 | Browns; 35–23 | Steelers; 9–7 | Browns; 21–7 | |
| 1964 | Tie 1–1 | Steelers; 23–7 | Browns; 30–17 | Browns; 22–8 | Steelers move to Pitt Stadium. Steelers' win is the Browns only home loss in the 1964 season. Browns win 1964 NFL Championship Game. |
| 1965 | Browns 2–0 | Browns; 24–19 | Browns; 42–21 | Browns; 24–8 | |
| 1966 | Tie 1–1 | Browns; 41–10 | Steelers; 16–6 | Browns; 25–9 | |
| 1967 | Browns 2–0 | Browns; 21–10 | Browns; 34–14 | Browns; 27–9 | As a result of expansion, the two eight-team divisions became two eight-team conferences split into two divisions, with the Browns and Steelers being placed in the NFL Century Division. |
| 1968 | Browns 2–0 | Browns; 31–24 | Browns; 45–24 | Browns; 29–9 | |
| 1969 | Browns 2–0 | Browns; 42–31 | Browns; 24–3 | Browns; 31–9 | |

1970s (Steelers, 15–5)

| Season | Season series | at Cleveland Browns | at Pittsburgh Steelers | Overall series | Notes |
|---|---|---|---|---|---|
| 1970 | Tie 1–1 | Browns; 15–7 | Steelers; 28–9 | Browns; 32–10 | As a result of the AFL–NFL merger, the Browns and Steelers are placed in the AFC Central (later renamed to the AFC North in the 2002 season). Steelers open Three Rivers Stadium. Browns' win extended the Steelers' losing streak to 16 games. |
| 1971 | Tie 1–1 | Browns; 27–17 | Steelers; 26–9 | Browns; 33–11 | |
| 1972 | Tie 1–1 | Browns; 26–24 | Steelers; 30–0 | Browns; 34–12 | |
| 1973 | Tie 1–1 | Browns; 21–16 | Steelers; 33–6 | Browns; 35–13 | Browns win 9 straight home meetings (1965–1973). |
| 1974 | Steelers 2–0 | Steelers; 26–16 | Steelers; 20–16 | Browns; 35–15 | Steelers' first season series sweep of the Browns since the 1959 season. Steelers win Super Bowl IX. |
| 1975 | Steelers 2–0 | Steelers; 42–6 | Steelers; 31–17 | Browns; 35–17 | In Cleveland, Steelers' DT "Mean" Joe Greene gets ejected for kicking Browns' OL Bob McKay in the groin. Steelers win Super Bowl X. |
| 1976 | Tie 1–1 | Browns; 18–16 | Steelers; 31–14 | Browns; 36–18 | |
| 1977 | Steelers 2–0 | Steelers; 28–14 | Steelers; 35–31 | Browns; 36–20 | |
| 1978 | Steelers 2–0 | Steelers; 34–14 | Steelers; 15–9 (OT) | Browns; 36–22 | First overtime game between the two teams. In Cleveland, Steelers' LB Jack Lambert is ejected for throwing punches at Browns' QB Brian Sipe and other players. During an interview with Howard Cosell the following week, Lambert reflects on the incident, stating, "Quarterbacks should wear dresses." Steelers win Super Bowl XIII. |
| 1979 | Steelers 2–0 | Steelers; 51–35 | Steelers; 33–30 (OT) | Browns; 36–24 | Game in Cleveland is the highest-scoring game in the rivalry (86 points). In Pittsburgh, Steelers overcame a 27–13 fourth quarter deficit. Steelers win Super Bowl XIV. |

1980s (Browns, 12–8)

| Season | Season series | at Cleveland Browns | at Pittsburgh Steelers | Overall series | Notes |
|---|---|---|---|---|---|
| 1980 | Tie 1–1 | Browns; 27–26 | Steelers; 16–13 | Browns; 37–25 | In Cleveland, Browns overcame a 20–7 third quarter deficit. In Pittsburgh, Steelers score the game-winning touchdown with 11 seconds remaining. |
| 1981 | Steelers 2–0 | Steelers; 32–10 | Steelers; 13–7 | Browns; 37–27 | |
| 1982 | Tie 1–1 | Browns; 10–9 | Steelers; 37–21 | Browns; 38–28 | Both games are played despite players' strike reducing the season to nine games. |
| 1983 | Tie 1–1 | Browns; 30–17 | Steelers; 44–17 | Browns; 39–29 | |
| 1984 | Tie 1–1 | Browns; 20–10 | Steelers; 23–20 | Browns; 40–30 | |
| 1985 | Tie 1–1 | Browns; 17–7 | Steelers; 10–9 | Browns; 41–31 | Steelers win 16 straight home meetings (1970–1985). |
| 1986 | Browns 2–0 | Browns; 37–31 (OT) | Browns; 27–24 | Browns; 43–31 | Browns record their first win at Three Rivers Stadium. Browns' first season series sweep of the Steelers since the 1969 season. |
| 1987 | Browns 2–0 | Browns; 34–10 | Browns; 19–13 | Browns; 45–31 | In Pittsburgh, Browns clinch the AFC Central with their win. |
| 1988 | Browns 2–0 | Browns; 27–7 | Browns; 23–9 | Browns; 47–31 | As of November 18, 2026, this remains the Browns' most recent season series sweep against the Steelers. |
| 1989 | Tie 1–1 | Steelers; 17–7 | Browns; 51–0 | Browns; 48–32 | In Pittsburgh, Browns record their largest victory against the Steelers with a 51–point differential and scored their most points in a game against the Steelers. Meanwhile, the Steelers set a franchise record for their worst loss overall. |

1990s (Steelers, 10–5)

| Season | Season series | at Cleveland Browns | at Pittsburgh Steelers | Overall series | Notes |
|---|---|---|---|---|---|
| 1990 | Tie 1–1 | Browns; 13–3 | Steelers; 35–0 | Browns; 49–33 | |
| 1991 | Tie 1–1 | Browns; 17–14 | Steelers; 17–10 | Browns; 50–34 | |
| 1992 | Tie 1–1 | Browns; 17–9 | Steelers; 23–13 | Browns; 51–35 | |
| 1993 | Tie 1–1 | Browns; 28–23 | Steelers; 16–9 | Browns; 52–36 | In Cleveland, Browns' PR Eric Metcalf returns two punts for touchdowns, including the game-winner in the final minutes. |
| 1994 | Steelers 2–0 | Steelers; 17–10 | Steelers; 17–7 | Browns; 52–38 | In Pittsburgh, Steelers clinch the AFC Central with their win. Steelers' first season series sweep of the Browns since the 1981 season. |
| 1994 Playoffs | Steelers 1–0 | —N/a | Steelers; 29–9 | Browns; 52–39 | AFC Divisional Round. |
| 1995 | Steelers 2–0 | Steelers; 20–17 | Steelers; 20–3 | Browns; 52–41 | Final season before the Browns relocated to Baltimore, becoming the Baltimore Ravens. In Pittsburgh, Steelers fans wear orange and brown armbands as a tribute to the seeming end of the rivalry. Steelers lose Super Bowl XXX. |
No games from 1996-1998 as the Browns suspended operations
| 1999 | Tie 1–1 | Steelers; 43–0 | Browns; 16–15 | Browns; 53–42 | Browns return to the NFL and open Cleveland Browns Stadium. Game in Cleveland was the inaugural game for the expansion Browns, while the Steelers record their largest victory against the Browns with a 43–point differential. Browns win came on a game-winning field goal by K Phil Dawson as time expired. |

2000s (Steelers, 18–3)

| Season | Season series | at Cleveland Browns | at Pittsburgh Steelers | Overall series | Notes |
|---|---|---|---|---|---|
| 2000 | Tie 1–1 | Browns; 23–20 | Steelers; 22–0 | Browns; 54–43 | Browns' win was their first home win after their reactivation. |
| 2001 | Steelers 2–0 | Steelers; 15–12 (OT) | Steelers; 28–7 | Browns; 54–45 | Steelers open Heinz Field (now known as Acrisure Stadium). The game in Pittsburgh was originally scheduled to be the first game at the venue during Week 2, but was rescheduled to Week 17 following the September 11 attacks. |
| 2002 | Steelers 2–0 | Steelers; 23–20 | Steelers; 16–13 (OT) | Browns; 54–47 | |
| 2002 Playoffs | Steelers 1–0 | —N/a | Steelers; 36–33 | Browns; 54–48 | AFC Wild Card Round. Steelers overcome a 24–7 third quarter deficit. |
| 2003 | Tie 1–1 | Steelers; 13–6 | Browns; 33–13 | Browns; 55–49 | As of November 18, 2026, this remains the Browns' only regular season win at Acrisure Stadium. |
| 2004 | Steelers 2–0 | Steelers; 24–10 | Steelers; 34–23 | Browns; 55–51 | Steelers draft QB Ben Roethlisberger. |
| 2005 | Steelers 2–0 | Steelers; 41–0 | Steelers; 34–21 | Browns; 55–53 | Steelers win Super Bowl XL. |
| 2006 | Steelers 2–0 | Steelers; 24–20 | Steelers; 27–7 | Tie; 55–55 | In Pittsburgh, Steelers' RB Willie Parker rushed for 223 yards, setting a franchise record for most rushing yards in a game by a player (broken by Le'Veon Bell in 2016). Last season where the Browns held the overall series record. |
| 2007 | Steelers 2–0 | Steelers; 34–7 | Steelers; 31–28 | Steelers; 57–55 | Steelers take the overall series lead. In Pittsburgh, Steelers overcame a 21–6 deficit. Both teams finished with 10–6 records, but the Steelers clinched the AFC North based on their head-to-head sweep, eliminating the Browns from playoff contention. |
| 2008 | Steelers 2–0 | Steelers; 10–6 | Steelers; 31–0 | Steelers; 59–55 | Steelers win Super Bowl XLIII. |
| 2009 | Tie 1–1 | Browns; 13–6 | Steelers; 27–14 | Steelers; 60–56 | Steelers win 12 straight meetings (2003–2009). |

2010s (Steelers, 16–3–1)

| Season | Season series | at Cleveland Browns | at Pittsburgh Steelers | Overall series | Notes |
|---|---|---|---|---|---|
| 2010 | Steelers 2–0 | Steelers; 41–9 | Steelers; 28–10 | Steelers; 62–56 | Steelers lose Super Bowl XLV. |
| 2011 | Steelers 2–0 | Steelers; 13–9 | Steelers; 14–3 | Steelers; 64–56 | |
| 2012 | Tie 1–1 | Browns; 20–14 | Steelers; 24–10 | Steelers; 65–57 | In Cleveland, Browns force eight Steelers turnovers. |
| 2013 | Steelers 2–0 | Steelers; 27–11 | Steelers; 20–7 | Steelers; 67–57 | In Cleveland, Browns' WR Josh Gordon finished with 237 receiving yards, setting a franchise record for most receiving yards in a game by a Browns' player (broken by him later in the season). |
| 2014 | Tie 1–1 | Browns; 31–10 | Steelers; 30–27 | Steelers; 68–58 | In Pittsburgh, Browns overcame a 27–3 deficit to tie the game, but the Steelers kicked the game-winning field goal. |
| 2015 | Steelers 2–0 | Steelers; 28–12 | Steelers; 30–9 | Steelers; 70–58 | |
| 2016 | Steelers 2–0 | Steelers; 24–9 | Steelers; 27–24 (OT) | Steelers; 72–58 | Starting with their loss in Pittsburgh, the Browns went on a 17-game losing streak. |
| 2017 | Steelers 2–0 | Steelers; 21–18 | Steelers; 28–24 | Steelers; 74–58 | In Pittsburgh, Steelers' win resulted in the Browns completing the second 0–16 season in NFL history. |
| 2018 | Steelers 1–0–1 | Tie; 21–21 (OT) | Steelers; 33–18 | Steelers; 75–58–1 | In Cleveland, both teams missed field goals in overtime that would have won them the game. With the tie, the Browns ended a 17-game losing streak and a 17-game division losing streak. |
| 2019 | Tie 1–1 | Browns; 21–7 | Steelers; 20–13 | Steelers; 76–59–1 | Game in Cleveland featured a brawl involving Steelers' players QB Mason Rudolph and C Maurkice Pouncey, and Browns' players DE Myles Garrett and DT Larry Ogunjobi. The altercation escalated when Garrett swung Rudolph's helmet at his head. All players involved, except Rudolph, were ejected and faced suspensions. |

2020s (Steelers, 8–7)

| Season | Season series | at Cleveland Browns | at Pittsburgh Steelers | Overall series | Notes |
|---|---|---|---|---|---|
| 2020 | Tie 1–1 | Browns; 24–22 | Steelers; 38–7 | Steelers; 77–60–1 | Steelers win 17 straight home meetings (2004–2020). Browns clinch their first playoff berth since the 2002 season with their win, setting up a rematch in the wild-card round the following week. |
| 2020 Playoffs | Browns 1–0 | —N/a | Browns; 48–37 | Steelers; 77–61–1 | AFC Wild Card Round. Browns' first win in Pittsburgh since the 2003 season, their first playoff win since the 1994 season, and their first playoff win over the Steelers. Browns score 28 points in the first quarter, tying an NFL record for a playoff game. Steelers QB Ben Roethlisberger sets an NFL record with 47 completions in the game. |
| 2021 | Steelers 2–0 | Steelers; 15–10 | Steelers; 26–14 | Steelers; 79–61–1 | Last season for Steelers' QB Ben Roethlisberger. |
| 2022 | Tie 1–1 | Browns; 29–17 | Steelers; 28–14 | Steelers; 80–62–1 | |
| 2023 | Tie 1–1 | Browns; 13–10 | Steelers; 26–22 | Steelers; 81–63–1 | |
| 2024 | Tie 1–1 | Browns; 24–19 | Steelers; 27–14 | Steelers; 82–64–1 | |
| 2025 | Tie 1–1 | Browns; 13–6 | Steelers; 23–9 | Steelers; 83–65–1 | |
| 2026 | Tie 1–1 | Browns; 27–24 | Steelers; 27–6 | Steelers; 84–66–1 | Steelers’ 23rd straight regular season home win over the Browns ties the NFL record for the longest such winning streak over a single opponent. They share it with the 1992–2014 Green Bay Packers over the Detroit Lions. |

Summary of Results

| Season | Season series | at Cleveland Browns | at Pittsburgh Steelers | Notes |
|---|---|---|---|---|
| Regular Season | Steelers 82–65–1 | Browns 44–29–1 | Steelers 53–21 | |
| Postseason | Steelers 2–1 | no games | Steelers 2–1 | AFC Wild Card: 2002, 2020; AFC Divisional: 1994 |
| Regular and postseason | Steelers 84–66–1 | Browns 44–29–1 | Steelers 55–22 | |

== See also ==
- List of NFL rivalries
- AFC North
