= Merchants National Bank =

Merchants National Bank may refer to:

- Merchants' National Bank in Grinnell, Iowa
- Merchants National Bank (Saint Paul) in Minnesota, also known as the McColl Building
- Merchants National Bank (Winona, Minnesota)
- Merchants National Bank (Kittanning, Pennsylvania), now known as Farmers & Merchants Bank of Western Pennsylvania
- Merchants National Bank and Annex in Indianapolis, Indiana, known as the Barnes and Thornburg Building
- Merchants National Bank and Trust Company of Indianapolis
- Merchants' National Bank Building (1895), Baltimore in Maryland
- Merchants' National Bank of New York, founded in New York City in April 1803
