= Reich Publishing and Marketing =

- Industry: Publishing and Marketing
- Headquarters: Pittsburgh, Pennsylvania, United States
- Website: reichpm.com

Reich Publishing and Marketing (RPM) is a sports marketing business in Pittsburgh, Pennsylvania. They are the exclusive representation of Pittsburgh Penguins Hall of Famer Mario Lemieux. ReichPM is a full-service sports marketing and management firm representing athletes, corporations, and non-profit organizations.

== Private autograph sessions ==
Reich Publishing and Marketing now arranges private autograph signings with Pittsburgh-based athletes. Their list of past autograph signings includes Pittsburgh Penguins Mario Lemieux, Marc-André Fleury, Max Talbot, Brooks Orpik, Ryan Whitney, Scotty Bowman, Ron Francis, Tom Barrasso, Mark Recchi and many others.

During the NHL lockout season, the company diversified into football. They now have business relationships with Pittsburgh Steelers Willie Parker, LaMarr Woodley, James Harrison, Ryan Clark and Larry Foote.

They also carry a variety of non-Pittsburgh related memorabilia from private signings.

== Distribution ==
Their memorabilia is usually very difficult to find for collectors, as most of it is sold to large corporations and via charitable auctions.
