= NexTier Bank =

American financial services corporation

NexTier Bank, N.A.
- Type: Private
- Industry: Financial Services
- Founded: 1878; 148 years ago (as Citizens National Bank)
- Founder: S.J. Irvine, Sr.
- Headquarters: Butler, Pennsylvania, United States
- Key people: Mark Karenchak; (Chairman of the Board); Clem Rosenberger; President & CEO
- Products: Financial services
- Number of employees: 325 (2026)
- Website: www.nextierbank.com

NexTier Bank is an American financial services corporation that has 32 branches located in Allegheny, Butler, Armstrong, Westmoreland, Mercer, Clearfield counties in western Pennsylvania and two offices in western New York.

On February 16, 2024, the bank's parent company, NexTier Inc., completed the merger of its operations with those of Mars Bancorp, including NexTier Bank.

== History ==
=== Founding as Citizens National Bank ===
S.J. Irvine, Sr. founded the bank in 1878 under its original name, Citizens National Bank, in the oil boomtown of Evansburg, Pennsylvania (now Evans City, Pennsylvania). The bank received a state charter in 1893 and its national charter in 1907.

In 1940, S.J. Irvine, Jr. succeeded his father as president. In 1959, S.J. Irvine III, began his career as bank president. In 2000, his daughter, Margaret Irvine Weir, became president of the bank, representing the fourth generation of the Irvine family to head the company.

=== Name change to NexTier ===
On October 11, 2005, the bank officially changed its name to NexTier Bank. It also adopted the tagline "Experience The Next Level." The name change resolved a dispute with the much larger Citizens Bank of Pennsylvania, which had 400+ branches, compared to Citizens National Bank's 15 branches.

== Corporate leadership ==
- Cleman C. Rosenberger III, President & Chief Executive Officer
- Robert A. Bowell, Executive Vice President & Chief Lending Officer
- Brian B. Dutton, Executive Vice President & Chief Risk Officer & General Counsel
- Heather Lively, Executive Vice President & Chief Financial Officer
- Darla J. Livermore, Senior Vice President & Director of Human Resource Management
- Heidi J. McDowell, Senior Vice President & Chief Banking Officer
- Louis C. Palumbo, Senior Vice President & Chief Information Officer
- Michael Smelko, Executive Vice President & Chief Credit Officer
- Stephanie Slezak, Senior Vice President & Loan Operations

== Primary operations ==
The primary operations of NexTier include NexTier Bank and NexTier Wealth Management.

== Corporate sponsorships ==
On April 10, 2006, NexTier bank purchased the naming rights for the Seneca Valley High School Stadium, renaming it NexTier Stadium.

== Awards ==
In 2008 NexTier Bank was listed as one of the Best Places to Work in Pennsylvania. NexTier also earned this distinction in 2000 and 2001.

On November 11, 2008, the Better Business Bureau of Pennsylvania awarded NexTier Bank the Torch Award for Marketplace Ethics.

== Northwest Bancshares ==
On May 5, 2010, Warren, Pennsylvania-based Northwest Bancshares agreed to buy NexTier for $20.3 million in cash. The sale was expected to close by the end of 2010, upon which the NexTier name would have been replaced by the Northwest Savings Bank name.

NexTier Inc. announced on November 8, 2010, that it terminated its agreement to merge with Northwest Bancshares, Inc. (Nasdaq: NWBI), citing Northwest's inability to secure regulatory approval for the merger. NexTier announced its intention to seek an infusion of cash subsequent to the termination of the merger agreement.

== NexTier and the Snyder Group ==
On February 2, 2010, NexTier, Inc., announced the successful completion of capital raising efforts. The Snyder Group of Kittaning, PA provided NexTier a capital infusion in the form of an investment in common stock, with an initial investment to NexTier January 31, 2011.. On April 14, 2011, NexTier Inc. announced regulatory approval from federal and state regulators for the capital infusion from the Snyder Group. The remaining capital infusion was completed in April 2011, resulting in 51% ownership of NexTier.

The Snyder Group is the owner of Snyder Associated Companies, a holding company with investments in mining, oil, and natural gas exploration activities, manufacturing, agriculture and banking. The Snyder Group also had a majority interest in the Farmers and Merchants Bank of Western Pennsylvania, based in Kittanning with 8 community offices serving Armstrong County.

In October 2014, NexTier merged with Farmers & Merchants Bank. The combined entity has 24 locations and will retain the NexTier name.

On January 8, 2016, NexTier completed its purchase of Eureka Bank, which had two branches in Allegheny County, including one in Oakland on Forbes Avenue.
