= CentiMark =

American roofing company

CentiMark Corporation
- Industry: Construction
- Founded: 1968
- Founders: Edward B. Dunlap
- Headquarters: Canonsburg, Pennsylvania, U.S.
- Services: Roofing, Flooring
- Website: www.centimark.com

CentiMark Corporation (est. 1968) is a national roofing contractor company headquartered in Canonsburg, Pennsylvania in the United States. The company also has a flooring division, QuestMark, and a Canadian Roofing subsidiary, CentiMark LTD.

== History ==
Edward B. Dunlap started D&B Laboratories in 1967 as a part-time industrial cleaning products business in the basement of his home. In 1968, with $1,000 seed money from D&B Laboratories and one associate, Dunlap started Northern Chemical Company. In response to customer needs, Northern Chemical Company became involved in roofing and flooring maintenance. In the 1970s, the oil crisis negatively impacted the built-up roofing market that was dependent on crude oil for asphalt. The quality of asphalt decreased as oil companies were pressed to extract as much oil from crude as possible. The price of asphalt increased, thus resulting in higher roofing prices.

Concerned about the quality of bituminous materials used in built-up tar and asphalt roofs, Northern Chemical Company began marketing and installing single-ply rubber (EPDM) roof systems. The newly developed EPDM polymer was both durable and waterproof. It was a cost-effective solution to the increasing costs associated with built-up roofing. In the late 1970s and early 1980s, EPDM was one of the fastest growing roofing products and accounted for almost 40% of new and replacement roofs on commercial and industrial properties.

== Growth ==
The company grew through geographical expansion, diversification of product lines and an aggressive National Accounts Program. In 1987, the corporate name was officially changed to CentiMark Corporation. "Centi" refers to the 1987 goal of achieving $100 million in revenue. "Mark" recognizes the company's unique contributions to the roofing industry including: a National Account program in roofing and flooring, Single Source warranties on workmanship and materials and nationwide geographical expansion.

In January 2003, Timothy M. Dunlap was appointed president and chief operating officer of CentiMark. Edward B. Dunlap, Founder of CentiMark, continues to serve as chairman and chief executive officer.

== Services ==
According to the company website, CentiMark offers the following systems and services:

- Roof repairs
- Green roofing
- Metal roofing
- Asset Management
- Commercial roofing
- Emergency Response
- Preventative Maintenance

Additionally, they offer Single Source Warranties on workmanship and materials.

== QuestMark ==
In 2006, QuestMark was established to expand CentiMark's presence in the flooring industry. DiamondQuest, a new technology for concrete grinding and polishing, catered to a fast-growing market segment in the flooring industry. According to the company website, QuestMark operates out of numerous offices nationwide.

== Locations ==
The CentiMark Corporation headquarters is located in Canonsburg, Pennsylvania, just outside Pittsburgh. CentiMark has over 80 offices and 3,500 associates across North America. They service all major cities.

== Recognition ==
In 1991, CentiMark became the first and only roofing contractor to be rated 4A1 by Dun & Bradstreet based on a strong credit appraisal and net worth. By 2000, the rating increased to 5A1, the highest level by Dun & Bradstreet. CentiMark continues to be peerless in the commercial roofing industry regarding the 5A1 Dun & Bradstreet rating.

In 2014, CentiMark was named the #1 Roofing Contractor in North America with revenue of $484.7 million, according to Roofing Contractor magazine, August 2014. Since 1991, in various roofing magazine rankings, CentiMark has consistently been the #1 or #2 roofing contractor in North America.
