= Manganese boride =

Names
- IUPAC name Boranylidynemanganese
- Other names: Manganese monoboride

Identifiers
CAS Number	12045-15-7
3D model (JSmol)	Interactive image
ChemSpider	74789
ECHA InfoCard	100.031.767
EC Number	234-957-2
PubChem CID	82881
CompTox Dashboard (EPA)	DTXSID401015529
- InChI: InChI=1S/B.Mn Key: PALQHNLJJQMCIQ-UHFFFAOYSA-N
- SMILES: B#[Mn]

Properties
Chemical formula	BMn
Molar mass	65.75 g·mol^{−1}
Appearance	brown crystals
Density	6.45–6.50 g/cm^{3}
Melting point	1,890 °C (3,430 °F; 2,160 K)
Solubility in water	Insoluble
- Except where otherwise noted, data are given for materials in their standard state (at 25 °C [77 °F], 100 kPa). Infobox references

Manganese boride is a binary inorganic compound of manganese and boron with the chemical formula MnB. Manganese boride is a hard, high-melting ceramic. Its hardness and stability arise from a strong network of covalent bonding between manganese and boron atoms.

== Synthesis ==
Manganese boride is typically synthesized by direct combination of the elements at high temperatures. The general reaction is:

Mn + B → MnB

== Physical properties ==
Manganese boride forms brown crystals of the orthorhombic system, space group Pnma. The compound is ferromagnetic.

It is insoluble in water.

MnB has low-temperature (α) and high-temperature (β) modifications, as well as a defect-rich low-temperature variant (α′).

== Uses ==
The compound is a refractory ceramic material belonging to the family of transition metal borides, known for their high hardness, thermal stability, and magnetic properties. Manganese monoboride exists in several polymorphic forms and exhibits complex magnetic behavior, making it of interest for both fundamental materials science and potential practical applications. As a result, MnB is widely used in the nuclear industry, aerospace high-temperature materials, new superconducting materials, and other fields.
