= 4moms =

American robotics company

Thorley Industries, LLC
- Company type: Private
- Industry: Consumer electronics, Robotics, Computer software
- Founded: 2005; 21 years ago
- Founders: Henry Thorne; Robert Daley
- Headquarters: Pittsburgh, Pennsylvania, U.S.
- Website: 4moms.com

4moms is an American robotics company specializing in baby products. Founded in March 2005 in Pittsburgh, Pennsylvania, it launched its first product Origami, a self-folding stroller. They are better known as the creator of the mamaRoo baby rocker which sold over two million units.

== History ==
In 2004, friends Henry Thorne, a roboticist, and Rob Daley, a businessman, met over lunch to discuss their individual plans for future business ventures. They both knew there were only two ways to make it as an entrepreneur: create a new market or change an existing one.

After researching industries, specifically elder care and juvenile products, Rob and Henry determined the $8.9 billion juvenile product industry presented the most appealing opportunity.

Officially established in 2005 under the parent company Thorley Industries, 4moms’ namesake comes from its first focus group of mothers.

== Products ==
In 2022, Over 2 Million 4moms MamaRoo and RockaRoo infant were recalled after an infant's death. The products were later rereleased with an upgraded design.

4moms products, such as strollers and baby swings, are available through various retailers, including specialty boutiques like Labebe Boutique.

- Origami, Self-Folding Stroller
- mamaRoo, Robotic Baby Swing.
