= Vector Security =

American electronic security company

Vector Security, Inc.
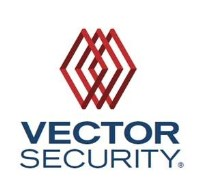
- Company type: Private
- Industry: Security Alarms, Security Alarms, Fire Alarm systems, Carbon Monoxide detectors, Fire suppression, Security systems, Communication systems, Video surveillance, Access control, Electronic article surveillance, Home Automation, Retail loss prevention, Network Security
- Founded: 1970
- Headquarters: Warrendale, Pennsylvania, U.S.
- Key people: Pamela J. Petrow President & CEO); Michael T. Grady (Executive Vice President); Chuck Thropp (CFO)
- Website: vectorsecurity.com

Vector Security, Inc. is an electronic security company in the United States. The company offers security services for both homes and businesses in the United States and Canada. Their corporate office is located in Warrendale, Pennsylvania.

== History ==
In the 1970s, Westinghouse Security Division sold to Westec to become a franchised network of security dealers. Eventually, Vector Security was formed through the acquisition of Kilbourne Security, a Philadelphia-based Westec Dealer, and Pittsburgh, PA-based Westec Dealer. The company's first name was PC Security, which was changed to Vector Security soon thereafter. Vector Security then began serving customers in Pennsylvania, Eastern Ohio, and Northern West Virginia.

In 1992, Vector Security began serving national multi-site customers with the launch of its National Accounts Division, which expanded into Canada in 1996.

In 2012, the company underwent rebranding and introduced its current logo and tagline, "Intelligent security tailored for you."

In August 2013, Vector Security acquired Industry Retail Group (IRG) to expand its portfolio by adding managed network services to its array of services for retailers and multisite businesses.

In 2015, the company acquired Pelican Security Network, a regional alliance of independent life safety and security services providers, expanding its footprint along the Gulf Coast from southwest Florida through Louisiana to Dallas/Fort Worth, Texas.

In 2019, Vector Security acquired Nashville-based ADS Security, expanding both companies' presence in North Carolina, Kentucky, and Florida, while adding new branch operations for Vector Security in Alabama, Mississippi, Georgia, South Carolina, and Tennessee.

The company has won awards including Dealer of the Year by SDM Magazine (2003, 2015) and numerous Sammy Awards, including Installer of the Year (Large) from SSI Magazine (2016). Police Dispatch Quality (PDQ) Award from the False Alarm Reduction Association (FARA) (2006); Central Station of the Year from the Central Station Alarm Association (2006); and Frost & Sullivan Best Practices Award (2008).

== Current operations ==
Vector provides commercial and home security systems to about 386,000 customers in North America, including multi-site businesses. The company has services and products consisting of intrusion and fire alarms, video surveillance, mobile and home automation solutions, access control, electronic article surveillance, robbery and assault notification, and a range of loss prevention solutions.

Additionally, with the 2013 acquisition of Industry Retail Group, Inc. (IRG), Vector Security is also a provider of managed infrastructure and business intelligence services in the United States, through its Vector Security Networks business division.

The company is based in Warrendale, Pennsylvania, and serves residential, commercial, and North American multisite businesses through a network of branch locations and authorized dealers.

=== Vector Security dealers ===
Vector Security, Inc., has an authorized dealer program. Under this program, independent dealers offer the same security systems offered by Vector Security branches. These security products and services are then monitored by Vector Security.
