= Bookminders =

American accounting company

- Type: Privately held company
- Industry: Accounting
- Founded: 1991; 35 years ago
- Founder: Tom Joseph
- Headquarters: Pittsburgh, Pennsylvania, United States
- Area served: United States
- Products: Outsourced bookkeeping
- Number of employees: 85
- Website: www.bookminders.com

Bookminders is an American accounting company that provides outsourced accounting and bookkeeping services for medium to large-sized businesses and nonprofit organizations, using a home-based workforce. It is headquartered in Pittsburgh.

The company traces its origins to Steele Financial Services, founded by Tom Joseph in the 1980s to provide flexible work opportunities for women needing work-life balance. Inspired by his sister Diane's effective use of an Apple IIc computer from home, Joseph envisioned a tech-based, flexible bookkeeping model. Although Steele Financial Services closed due to technological limitations of the time, the concept laid the groundwork for Bookminders. Founded officially in 1991, Bookminders was designed to offer affordable, high-quality outsourced bookkeeping for small businesses, while also providing meaningful part-time work.

The company developed the concept of the "Cottage Corporation." A Cottage Corporation has its employees working from home and its corporate headquarters in an office building, unlike a home-based business, which has its main office in a home.

Bookminders has been featured in media outlets including the Philadelphia Business Journal, Pittsburgh Business Times, The Pittsburgh Post-Gazette, The Daily Record, Austin Business Journal, Smart Business Network, MSN Money, KXAN, TEQ, Intuit Advisor Spotlight, Accounting Today and The Wall Street Journal.

== History ==
In 1991, Tom Joseph founded Bookminders with the idea that he could attract top-tier talent if he offered a flexible work environment. It is a concept he devised when implementing an accounting system for his father's business after the Joseph’s family business lost their bookkeeper in 1984. Tom, who had early exposure to Apple computers in his job at Westinghouse, bought an Apple IIc computer along with accounting software and formed Steele Financial Services. The original idea of having his uncle run the system was a failure, but Tom’s sister Diane was able to grasp the new technology and agreed to take on the role if she could work primarily from home. Tom and Diane transformed a lengthy process into one that took only a few hours, completed mostly from her home office. In an era before the internet, this was a radical concept. Despite this initial success, the idea was not scalable given the lack of internet infrastructure and led to the closure of Steele Financial Services.

Over the next seven years, Tom continued his career in factory automation.

When Tom launched Bookminders in 1991, he enlisted the help of Diane’s twin sister, Lynne.

Over the years, the company transitioned from using floppy disks and shared email accounts to a customized, cloud-based platform that supported remote work long before it became mainstream. Today, Bookminders is a provider of outsourced bookkeeping for nonprofits and mid- to large-sized businesses.

A focus on building resources tailored to non-profits and small to mid-size businesses, along with the opening of the Philadelphia office in 2006, led to Bookminders’ emergence as the premier outsourced bookkeeping service in Pennsylvania. Over the next decade, its innovative concept and in-demand services resulted in the launch of two additional locations: a Cherry Hill, New Jersey office and Eastern Maryland. The strong, employee-centric culture and remote opportunities attracted an influx of staff. Finally, with an abundance of resources and growing demand, Bookminders expanded its footprint beyond the Eastern United States with a Central Texas location in 2022 and Indiana office in 2024.

== Recognition ==
Bookminders was recognized by the Pittsburgh Business Times in their "50 Best Places to Work" listing, honored by the Pittsburgh Human Resources Association for their employment model, and presented with the "Balance Award - Company of the Year" by the American Society of Women Accountants. They were also recognized as "Pennsylvania Home-Based Business Champion" for outstanding performance by the U.S. Small Business Administration and among Pittsburgh's 100 Fastest Growing Private Companies by the Pittsburgh Business Times in 1997, 1998, 2000, 2001, 2002, 2003, and 2004. The company was named the Pittsburgh Post-Gazette's #2 Top Workplace in 2022 and 2023, securing the #1 spot in 2024. In 2024, The Daily Record celebrated the company as one of its Empowering Women honorees.

CEO Jessica Minkus was named the Pittsburgh Post-Gazette's Top Leader in the Top Workplaces Awards in both 2022 and 2024. She was honored by Smart Business Magazine's Smart 50 Awards and the Pittsburgh Business Times's C-Suite Awards in 2023.
