= Farmers and Merchants Bank of Western Pennsylvania =

Farmers and Merchants Bank of Western PA
- Type: Banking institution
- Industry: Financial Institution
- Founded: Kittanning, Pennsylvania, United States, 2008
- Headquarters: Kittanning, Pennsylvania, United States
- Key people: Richard Krauland - President & CEO
- Products: Financial services
- Number of employees: 91
- Website: www.fmbwpa.com

Farmers and Merchants Bank of Western Pennsylvania (F&M Bank) was a local bank in Kittanning, Pennsylvania, United States. It was the result of the merger between the Merchants National Bank of Kittanning and the Farmers National Bank of Kittanning in early 2008.

== History ==
Farmers and Merchants Bank was the result of the Merchants National Bank of Kittanning and the Farmers National Bank of Kittanning merging in 2008. Merchants National Bank was the surviving company. Merchants National Bank has operated for 110 years and Farmers National Bank has operated for 123 years. At the time of the merger, Farmers National Bank of Kittanning was the only bank in Kittanning operating under its original charter. Until 1920, the Farmers National Bank printed its own money. In 1999, Merchants National Bank started to offer its online banking service (Net Banker) to its customers.

== Merger with NexTier Bank ==
In October 2014, Farmers and Merchants Bank merged with NexTier Bank. The combined bank will use the NexTier name. Both banks were majority owned by an investment company called the Snyder Group.
