= Vocelli Pizza =

American pizzeria chain

- Formerly: Pizza Outlet
- Type: Subsidiary
- Industry: Fast food
- Founded: 1988; 38 years ago, in Pittsburgh, Pennsylvania, US
- Headquarters: Pittsburgh, Pennsylvania, US
- Key people: Varol Ablak (CEO); Seckin Ablak, Harry Ablak (founders)
- Products: Pizza, Pasta
- Website: www.vocellipizza.com

Vocelli Pizza /voʊˈtʃɛli/ (formerly Pizza Outlet) is an American pizzeria based in Pittsburgh, Pennsylvania. As of 2022, the chain has stores in Alabama, Maryland, New Jersey, Ohio, Pennsylvania, South Carolina, Virginia, and West Virginia. The trade magazine Pizza Today ranked Vocelli Pizza in their Top 100 pizza franchises for 2007, based on its 2006 sales of $55 million.

== History ==
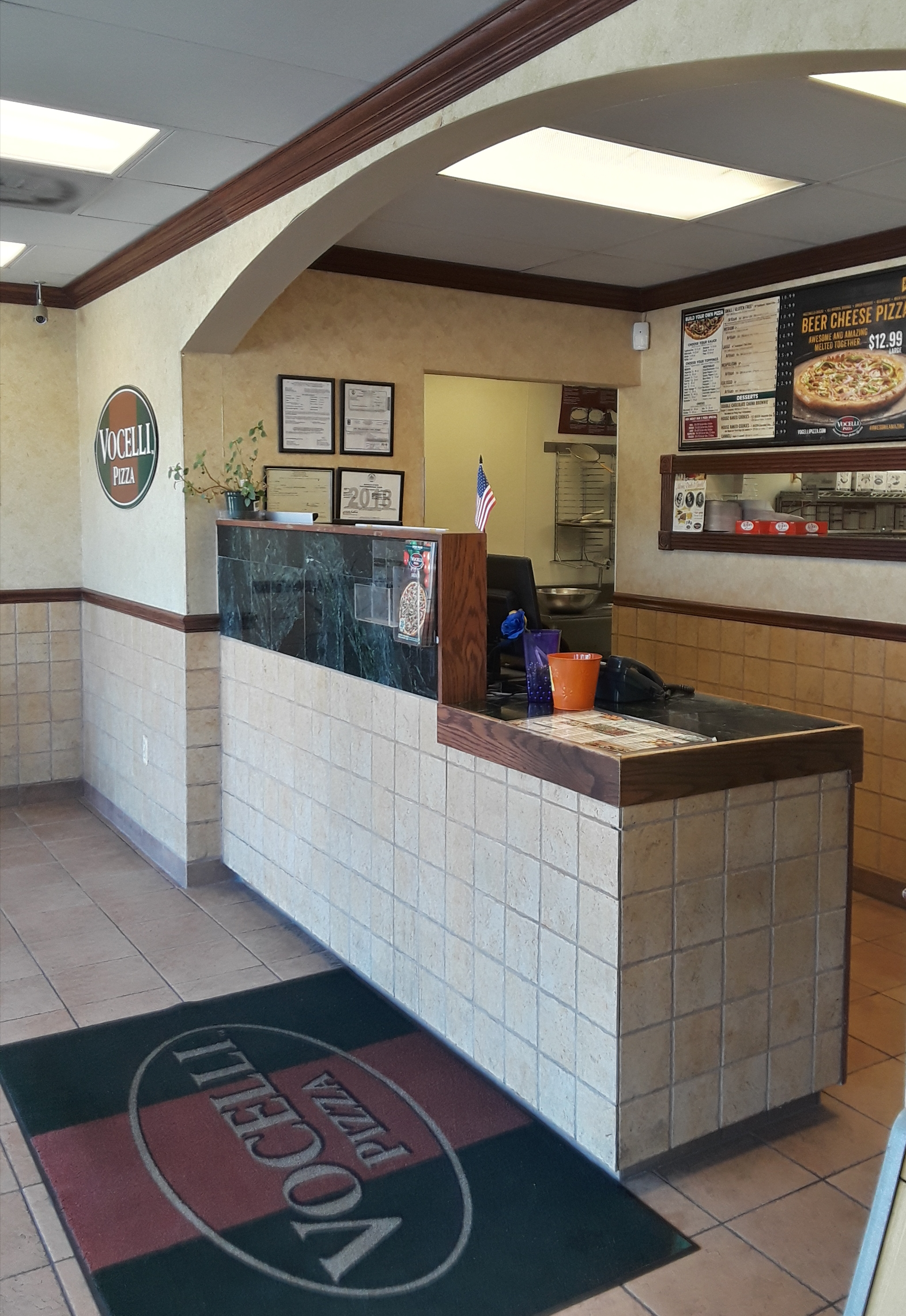
Interior of a franchise location in Fairfax County, Virginia

=== Pizza Outlet ===
The chain was founded by the Ablak family in Mt. Lebanon, Pennsylvania near Pittsburgh in 1988 as Pizza Outlet. What was simply a local pizza shop quickly expanded in the Pittsburgh Tri-State region during the 1990s. During this time, their slogan was "Delivering Great Taste to Your Door". They also briefly used "The Taste that SCREAMS Fresh!" as well before reverting to their old slogan. Pizza Outlet was widely regarded as an affordable option for college students on a budget, especially among University of Pittsburgh students in the dorm towers.

This era is remembered for featuring wrestler Kurt Angle in a commercial featuring two animated pizza toppings that the chain had been using as mascots at the time wrestling each other on top of a pizza Angle had just ordered. The Rock later poked fun at Angle and the commercial on an episode of WWE Raw is War in Angle's hometown after Angle had established himself in the WWE.

=== Change to Vocelli ===
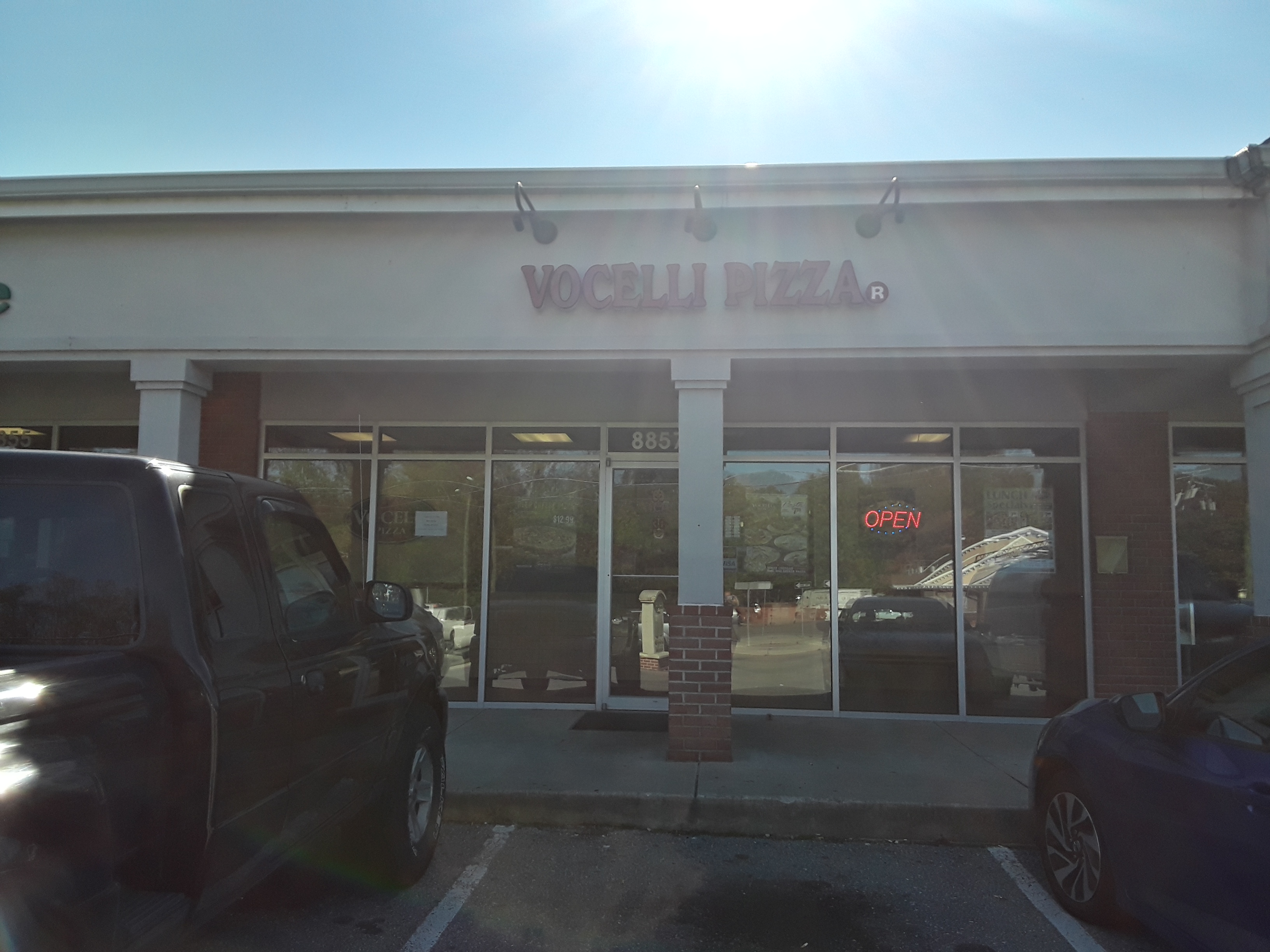
Exterior of a location in Fairfax County, Virginia

After experiencing fast growth throughout the 1990s in its home market, the chain entered select markets in the Southern United States. However, the chain initially was not as successful.

Instead of withdrawing from these markets to focus on the more successful (and more competitive) Pittsburgh market, Pizza Outlet instead changed the name of their 73 southern locations to Vocelli Pizza in 2002, and adopting an Italian theme in the restaurant in the process. Previously, the Pizza Outlet locations had no specific theme inside each location. The transition to a new brand, including a new pizza box design and marketing campaign, cost the company around one million dollars.

Despite the changes, the product itself remained the same. Nevertheless, sales at the southern stores skyrocketed after the change. So much so, that the company reverted plans to keep the Pizza Outlet name in Pittsburgh and the remaining Pizza Outlet stores were rebranded as Vocelli Pizza in 2003.

Today, Vocelli continues to expand, and is currently ranked as one of the fast-growing pizzerias in the United States. In 2012, Vocelli Pizza operated 100 locations.
