= Steelmark =

Industry logo

The "Steelmark" logo, originated by U.S. Steel and now a trademark of the American Iron and Steel Institute, is used to promote the steel industry. The logo of the Pittsburgh Steelers is based on the Steelmark.

The Steelmark is a logo representing steel and the steel industry owned by the American Iron and Steel Institute, and used by it to promote the product and its manufacturers.

The logo was incorporated as the emblem of the Pittsburgh Steelers and Huachipato Football Club, both teams being closely associated with steelworkers. At first, their respective symbols used the same design as the Steelmark, but they were later modified to include the team's full name.

== Description ==
An astroid

The Steelmark consists of three four-pointed starlike figures within a circle. The stars in the design approximate a type of geometric figure called an astroid, a particular type of hypocycloid with four cusps. The original figures were most likely constructed with the help of French curves and a bit of artistic license, as the logo was designed decades before computer-aided graphics came into common use. The actual figures are somewhat more concave than mathematically true astroids. A yellow figure is located at the top of the design, orange to the right and blue on the bottom, with the word "Steel" on the left side. The logo appears within a gray ring against a white background.

== History ==
The Steelmark was designed by a team led by Emil O. Biemann at the packaging and industrial design firm Lippincott & Margulies, and was first unveiled alongside the current U.S. Steel trademark on March 31, 1958. AISI president Benjamin F. Fairless later proclaimed that the campaign marked "the first time that steel has been merchandised industry-wide at the consumer level". Fairless predicted that the program would help American steel makers fend off demand for imports.

Individual steel makers could use the design to promote the steel in finished products, and to help create a competitive awareness of the strength and quality of steel against aluminum and plastics. In 1964, the steel industry distributed 21 million of the Steelmark decals to be affixed to appliances and other household products.

In advertising for the program, the three hypocycloids were said to represent "the modernity, lightness and stylishness" of consumer products made of American steel. Later interpretations were that the Steelmark highlighted the attributes of steel, with yellow representing "lightens your work", the orange denoting "brightens your leisure" and the blue meaning that steel "widens your world". The definition of the logo components was updated to represent the three materials used to produce steel, with yellow for coal, orange for iron ore and blue for scrap steel.

== Pittsburgh Steelers ==
The Pittsburgh Steelers logo is a variation of the Steelmark logo.

Co-owner of the Steelmark logo, Cleveland-based Republic Steel approached the owners of the Pittsburgh Steelers about placing the logo on their helmets for the 1962 NFL season, figuring that it would be a perfect product placement for the steel manufacturers. The equipment manager for the team was told to put the logo on the right side of the team's all-gold helmets. The Steelers went 9–5 that season, their best record to that date. For their first post-season game, in the 1962 Playoff Bowl, the team changed the helmet color from gold to black to make it stand out more and it has remained largely unchanged since, with the team being the only one in the National Football League to have a logo on only one side of the helmet. In 1963, the Steelers petitioned the American Iron and Steel Institute to be allowed to change the word "Steel" in the logo to the full team name, which was approved by the AISI.

== Huachipato FC ==
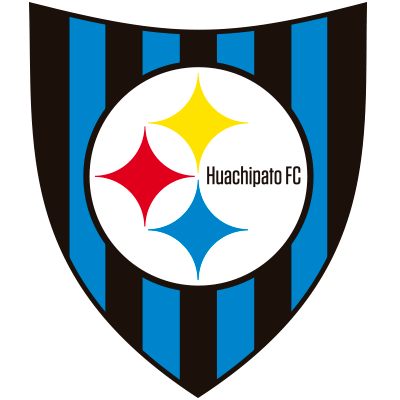
Huachipato's logo has the same variation of the Steelmark logo as the Pittsburgh Steelers, but mirrored.

The Chilean soccer club Huachipato has a mirror image of the Steelmark logo as part of its shield. The team's and its supporters are nicknamed "The Steelers" (Los Acereros), as the club was founded by steel mill workers in Talcahuano from Compañía de Acero del Pacífico, Chile's national iron and steel industry. The Steelmark was added to the club's logo as a homage to the steelworker origins of the club.
