= Lakeview Park (Lorain, Ohio) =

Beach park in Lorain, Ohio, United States

Coordinates: 41.4612°N 82.1945°W

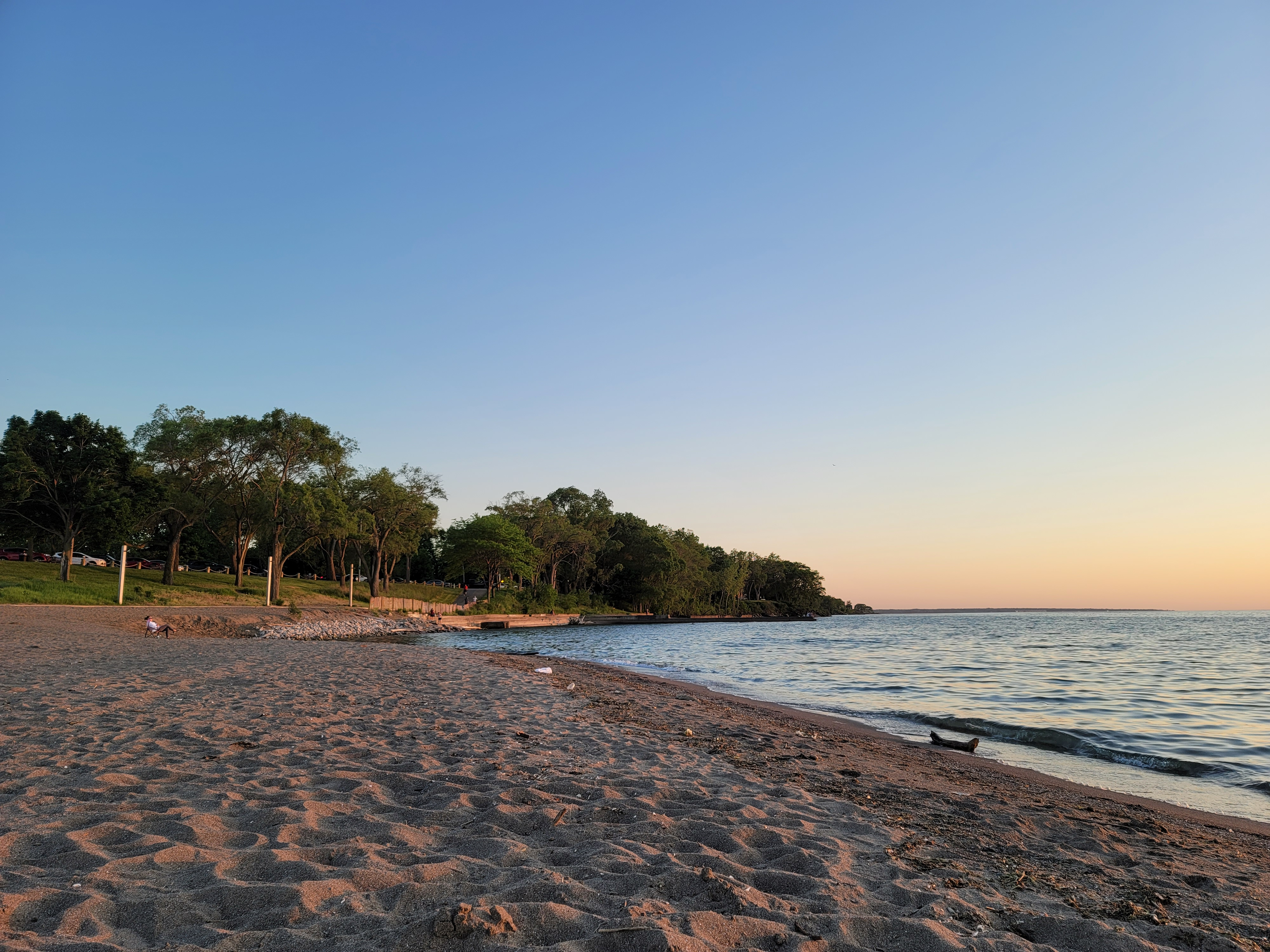
Lakeview Park beach with view of Lake Erie near sunset.

Lakeview Park is a public beach park located along Lake Erie in Lorain, Ohio. Established in 1917 by the City of Lorain, the park is divided into north and south sections by U.S. Route 6 / West Erie Avenue. Both sides of the park were managed by the City of Lorain until 2006 when management was split between the City of Lorain and the Lorain County Metro Parks. The north beach side is managed by the Lorain County Metro Parks and Lakeview Park South is managed by the City of Lorain.

The north side of the park includes the public beach, Bath House (with event space with a restaurant and concession stand in the summer), rose garden, fountain, lawn bowling, gazebos and picnic areas, and several historical monuments including one of the Lorain Easter Baskets. Since 2020, the Lorain Public Library System operates a converted shipping container as a "Little Library on the Lake" which lends beach and sports equipment to library card holders.

The south side consists of ball diamonds, concession stand, playground, picnic area, tennis and pickleball courts, and parking lot. The tennis and pickleball courts are converted into a temporary ice skating rink in the winter.

== History ==
The Sandusky-Lorain Tornado first made landfall in Lorain at Lakeview Park in 1924, destroying the bath house. The bathhouse was rebuilt after the tornado, but went through massive renovations by the Lorain County Metro Parks in 2007 to become the Lakeview Park Bathhouse and Visitor Center.

=== Monuments and historical markers ===
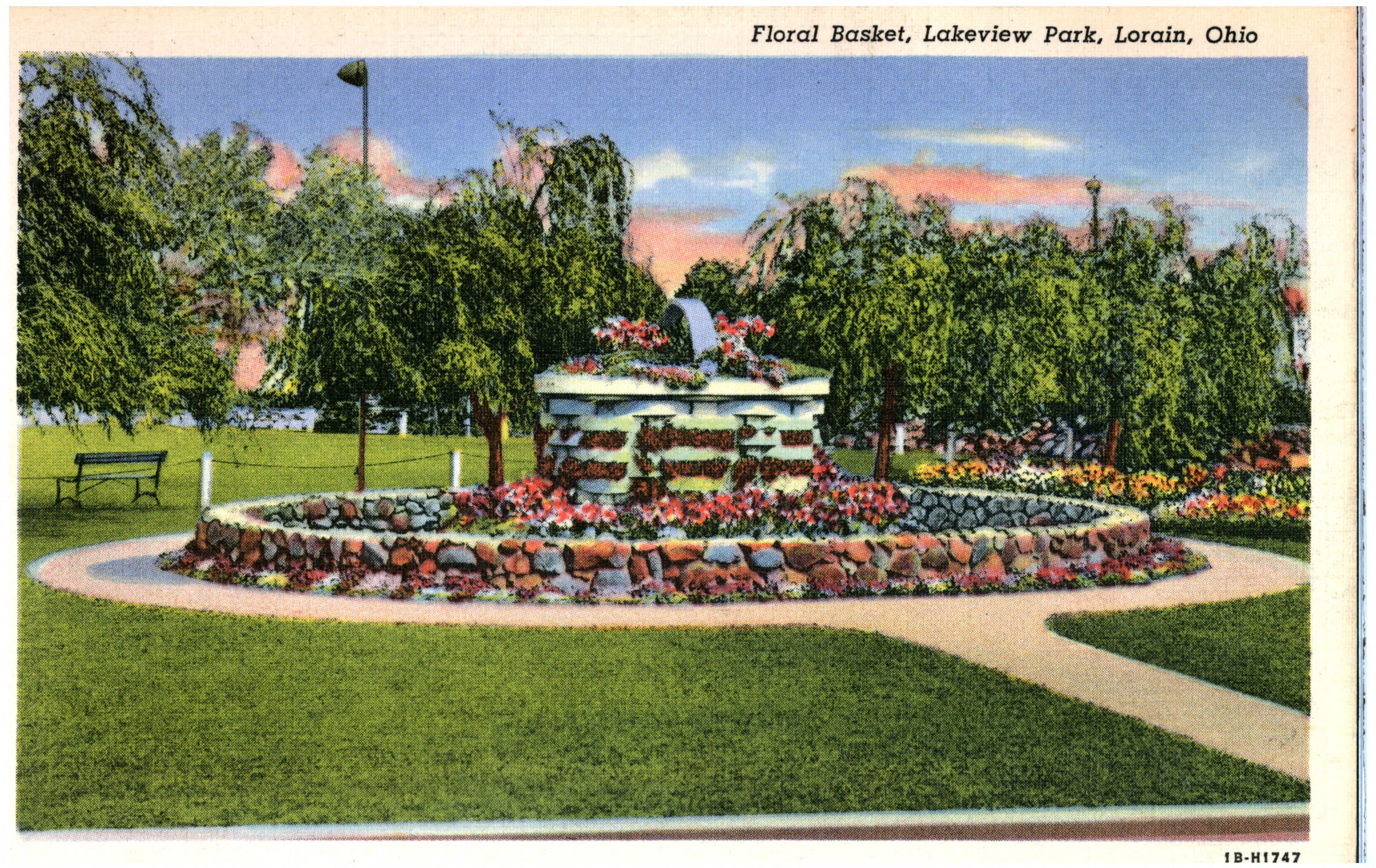
Folar Basket, Lakeview Park, Lorain, Ohio - DPLA - 47c8ba89e5a3ebf8adfd0a9b36a51821 (page 1)

The Easter Basket monument inside Lakeview Park was created by David Shukait in 1937. The basket is seven feet and two inches tall and ten feet and 3 inches wide. Shukait was employed by the City of Lorain Parks Department as a mechanic and created the sculpture by weaving concrete. The city began and Lorain County Metro Parks have continued the tradition of painting the Easter basket and added eggs to the basket for the Easter season. Families getting their photographs taken by the basket at Easter time has become a Lorain tradition.

Lakeview Park War Memorial, dedicated in 1942 by Admiral Ernest J. King, is dedicated to the men and women from Lorain who served during the first and second World Wars.

== Birdwatching ==
Lakeview Park is a location on the Ohio Department of Natural Resources' Huron & Lorain Loop which is a trail of birdwatching sites along Lake Erie. Migratory birds can be spotted in the park especially near the beach.

Since 2024, there has been an active eagles nest at Lakeview Park South.
