= Lorain Palace Theatre =

- U.S. National Register of Historic Places
- Location within Ohio Location within the United States
- Location: 617 Broadway Ave, Lorain, Ohio
- Coordinates: 41°27′57″N 82°10′30″W
- Area: Lorain, Lorain County, Ohio
- Built: 1928
- Architectural style: Late 19th And 20th Century Gothic, Italian Renaissance
- NRHP reference No.: 78002109
- Added to NRHP: 1978

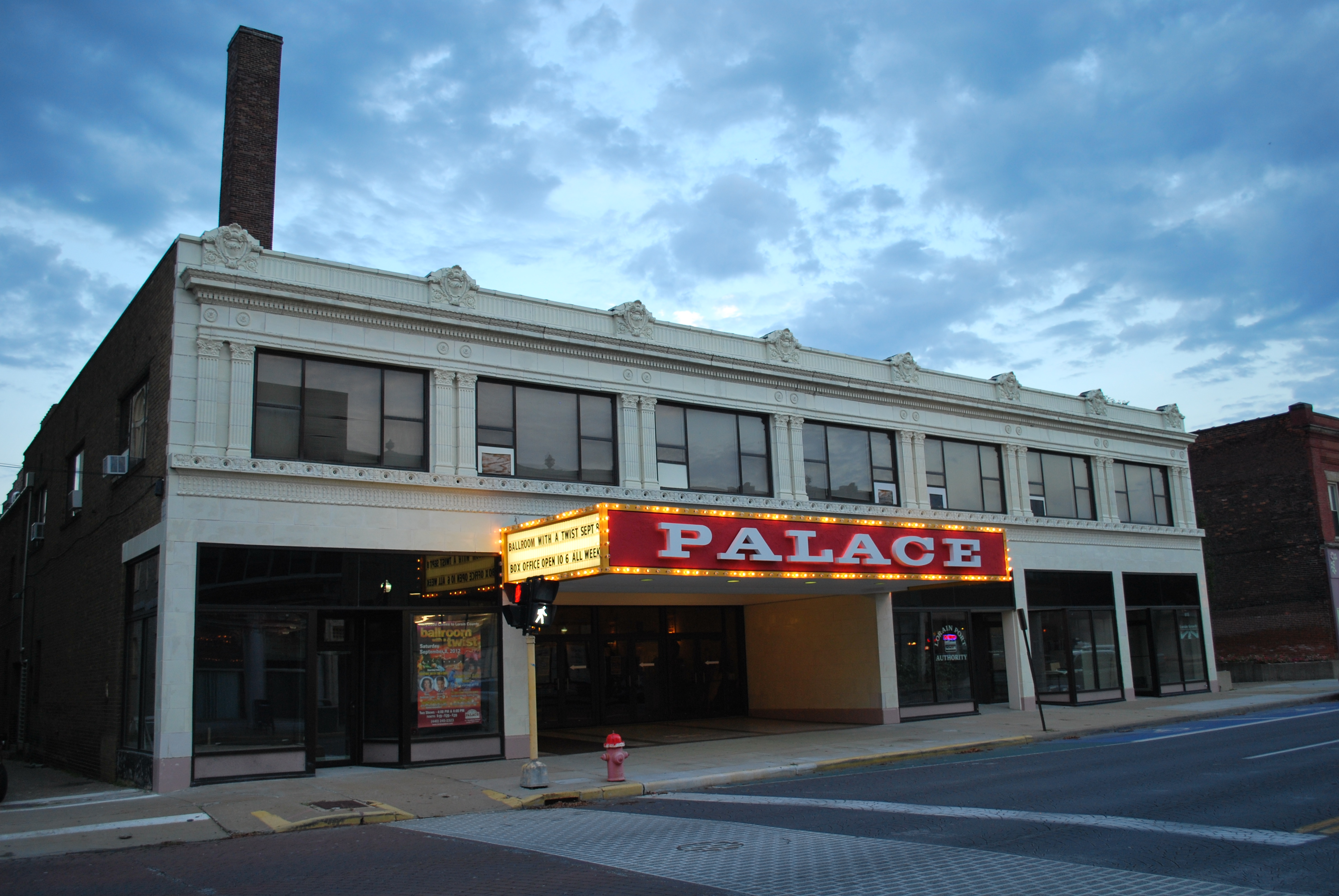
Palace Theater Lorain OH

The Lorain Palace Theater is a theater located in Lorain, Ohio. Built in 1928, the opening night film was a pre-release of Paramount's "Something Always Happens" which was the first talky ever played in the State of Ohio. The theater is still in operation as a community Civic Center, movie theater, meeting place, and entertainment facility.

The theater has a mix of design features including an Italian Renaissance Revival style auditorium and a Venetian Gothic style lobby. The crystal chandelier, Wurlitzer pipe organ, and two spacious loges are just some of the features which made this building worthy of being preserved. The building was added to the National Register of Historic Places in 1978.

== History ==
The theatre was built as part of an initiative to rebuild downtown Lorain, following the devastating 1924 Lorain-Sandusky Tornado which destroyed most of the town's urban center. The State Theater (located north of the Palace on Broadway) balcony and roof collapsed when the tornado struck during a show causing several casualties. When the Palace was completed four years later, it was the largest one floor motion picture theatre in Ohio. It was intentionally built without a balcony because of what happened at the State Theater and was built with reinforced, "tornado-proof" concrete.

Initially designed to seat 1,720 people, today it seats closer to 1,400.

The Wurlitzer Organ, still in operation, is original to the theater. It is one of three Wurlitzer Organs in Ohio that are still in operation and in their original locations. This specific type of organ, Wurlitzer Style 200, is "...also one of only two Wurlitzer's of this particular style - worldwide - that is still in its original installed location and in its original installed condition." The organ was refurbished in 2014.

The theater remained popular well into the 1960s. However, popularity of the theatre diminished following the construction of the nearby Midway Mall in Elyria in the mid-1960s. Several other theatres and shops in the area closed their doors at this time.

== Renovation ==
Restoration of the theatre began in 1977 and so far the non-profit organization operating the location has raised an excess of $6 million towards the cost of its restoration and renovation. Twenty-five thousand dollars was tendered as a down payment toward the purchase of the $100,000 building. A capital funds campaign was launched and in May 1977 the Palace Theater building was purchased and a grand opening was held. The Palace had been using the same carbon arc projectors since 1935. The light on the screen was created when 80 amps of electricity jumped between two large pencil-sized carbon rods. The carbon arc generated enough illumination to project the movie onto the screen 180 feet (55 m) away. Recently the theatre moved those projectors into the lobby and installed a new theatre system including a new platter projector, a digital projector, and a 16-speaker theatre surround sound system.

First Lady Rosalynn Carter visited the theater in 1979, and recognized the around 800 volunteers who had recently completed major renovations to the theater.

In 2008 a plan was made to connect the Lorain Palace Theatre with the adjacent Eagles Building via a glass arcade. The project would partly be funded by a $200,000 grant from the city of Lorain, most of which would be required to purchase the Eagles Building while the rest would go to construction costs to the facade and marquee of the theatre. However, an additional $7.5 million would be needed to complete the project, which includes renovating the interior and exterior of the 37,000-square-foot (3,400 m^{2}) Eagles building, as well as a section of the theater and the construction of the arcade.

== Lorain Palace today ==
The Palace Theatre in Lorain continues to have funding issues but has thus far managed to hit fund-raising goals to keep its doors open. In October 2008, the theatre held a masquerade ball which helped bring in an additional $6,000. The theatre has also made several budget cuts and for now is managing to keep itself going with the aid of donations and other fund-raising efforts.

== See also ==
- Movie palaces list
