= Lorain, Ohio =

- City
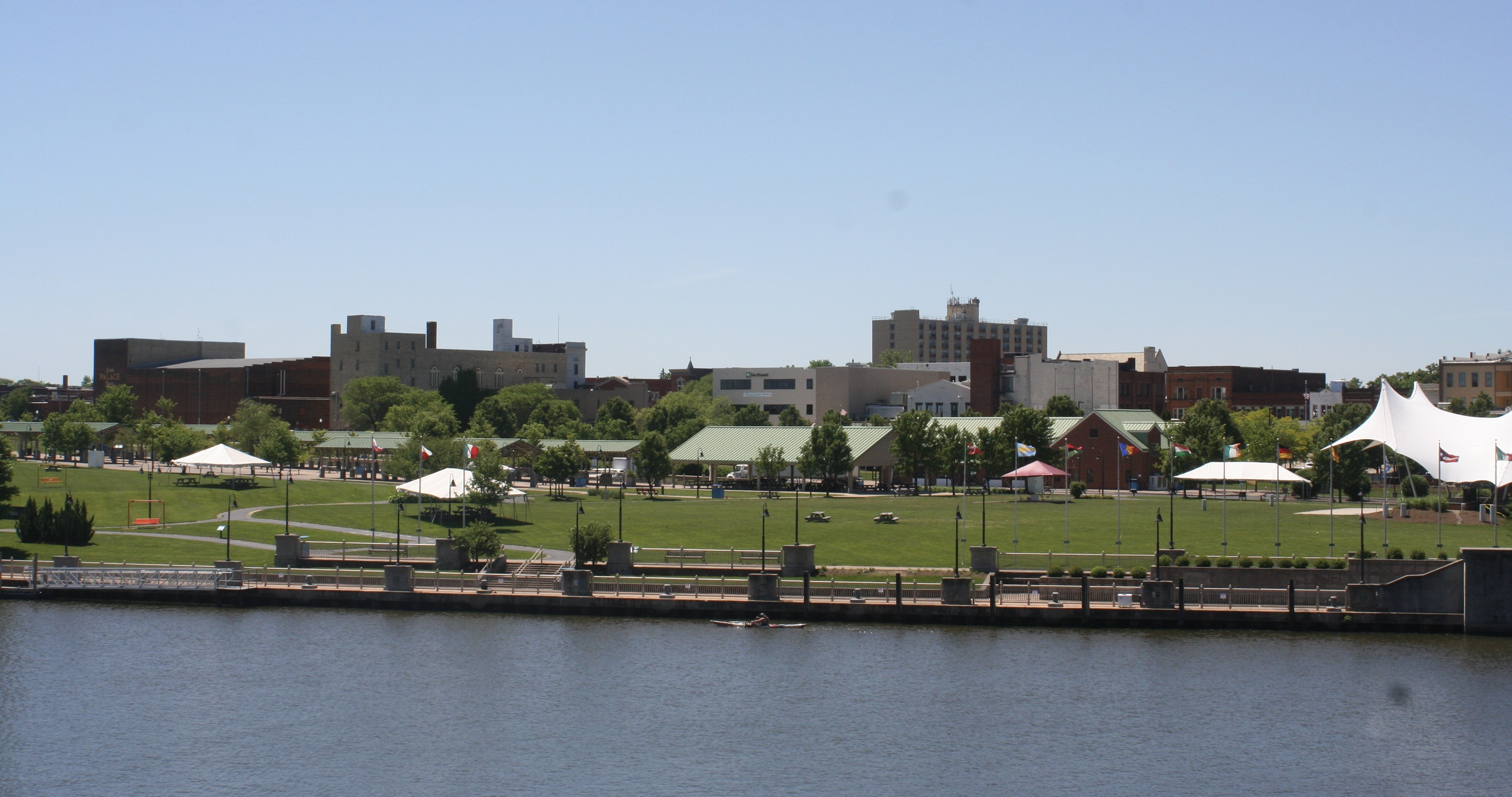
- Downtown Lorain

- Flag Seal
- Nicknames: International City, Steel City
- Interactive map of Lorain, Ohio
- Location within Ohio Location within the United States
- Coordinates: 41°26′24″N 82°10′08″W
- Country: United States
- State: Ohio
- County: Lorain
- Founded: 1807
- Incorporated: February, 1817
- Incorporated: July 16, 1834 (township)

Government
  - Type: Mayor–council

Area
  - City: 24.08 sq mi (62.37 km^{2})
  - Land: 23.61 sq mi (61.14 km^{2})
  - Water: 0.47 sq mi (1.23 km^{2})
- Elevation: 617 ft (188 m)

Population (2020)
  - City: 65,211
  - Density: 2,762.4/sq mi (1,066.57/km^{2})
  - Urban: 199,067 (US: 196th)
  - Urban density: 2,196.9/sq mi (848.2/km^{2})
- Time zone: UTC−5 (EST)
  - Summer (DST): UTC−4 (EDT)
- Zip code(s): 44052–44055
- Area code: 440
- FIPS code: 39-44856
- GNIS feature ID: 1086514
- Website: www.cityoflorain.org

Lorain (/lɔːˈreɪn/) is a city in Lorain County, Ohio, United States. It is located in Northeast Ohio on Lake Erie at the mouth of the Black River, about 25 miles (40 km) west of Cleveland. With a population of 65,211 at the 2020 census, Lorain is the ninth-most populous city in Ohio, the most populous in Lorain County and the third-most populous in Greater Cleveland.

== History ==
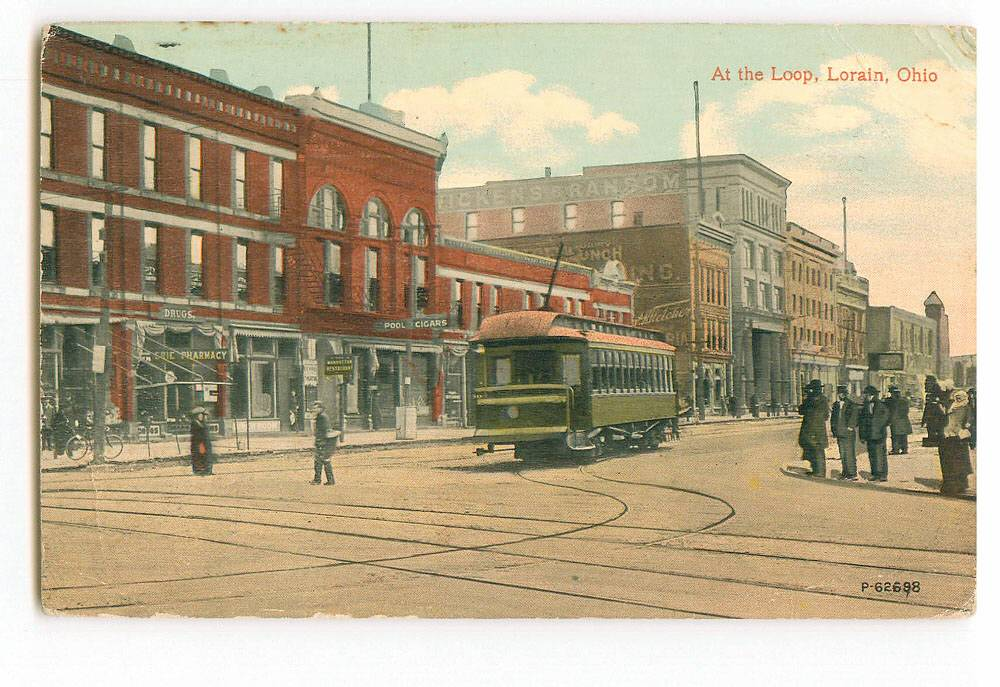
"At the Loop", Lorain, c. 1913

According to local government records, the city began as an unincorporated village established before 1834 as “Black River Village”, and was renamed in 1837 as "Charleston." According to 19th-century historians, the new name was rejected by its own citizens, who continued to use Black River Village. The village was incorporated as Lorain in 1874 and became a city in 1896. The first mayor was Conrad Reid, who took office on April 6, 1874. The municipal boundaries incorporated most of the former Black River Township judicial boundaries, and portions of the Sheffield Township, Amherst Township, and Brownhelm Township judicial borders.

The 1924 Lorain–Sandusky tornado hit the city on Saturday, June 28, 1924. The tornado formed over the Sandusky Bay during the late afternoon hours and hit Sandusky, where it killed eight people and destroyed 100 homes and 25 businesses. After moving east over Lake Erie for several miles, the tornado then struck Lorain, killing 72. Among the dead were 15 people inside a collapsed theater, which makes it the worst tornado-related death toll from a single building in Ohio. Eight people were also killed inside the Bath House near the location where the tornado came onshore.

== Geography ==
According to the United States Census Bureau, the city has a total area of 24.14 square miles (62.52 km^{2}), of which 23.67 square miles (61.31 km^{2}) is land and 0.47 square miles (1.22 km^{2}) is water.

== Demographics ==
Historical population
Census	Pop.	Note	%±
1880	1,595		—
1890	4,863		204.9%
1900	16,028		229.6%
1910	28,883		80.2%
1920	37,205		28.8%
1930	44,512		19.6%
1940	44,125		−0.9%
1950	51,202		16.0%
1960	68,932		34.6%
1970	78,185		13.4%
1980	75,416		−3.5%
1990	71,245		−5.5%
2000	68,652		−3.6%
2010	64,097		−6.6%
2020	65,211		1.7%
U.S. Decennial Census

=== 2020 census ===
As of the 2020 census, Lorain had a population of 65,211. The median age was 38.8 years. 24.7% of residents were under the age of 18 and 17.1% of residents were 65 years of age or older. For every 100 females there were 91.2 males, and for every 100 females age 18 and over there were 87.0 males age 18 and over.

Of the population, 49.4% were non-Hispanic White, 29.2% were Hispanic or Latino, 15.2% were non-Hispanic Black, 0.4% were Asian, 0.2% were Native American or Pacific Islander, and 5.6% were mixed or other.

100.0% of residents lived in urban areas, while 0.0% lived in rural areas.

There were 26,595 households in Lorain, of which 29.6% had children under the age of 18 living in them. Of all households, 33.6% were married-couple households, 21.1% were households with a male householder and no spouse or partner present, and 36.7% were households with a female householder and no spouse or partner present. About 32.7% of all households were made up of individuals and 13.2% had someone living alone who was 65 years of age or older.

There were 29,566 housing units, of which 10.0% were vacant. The homeowner vacancy rate was 2.2% and the rental vacancy rate was 9.7%.

Racial composition as of the 2020 census
Race	Number	Percent
White	37,636	57.7%
Black or African American	11,170	17.1%
American Indian and Alaska Native	400	0.6%
Asian	312	0.5%
Native Hawaiian and Other Pacific Islander	24	0.0%
Some other race	6,320	9.7%
Two or more races	9,349	14.3%
Hispanic or Latino (of any race)	19,068	29.2%

=== 2010 census ===
As of the census of 2010, there were 64,097 people, 25,529 households, and 16,368 families living in the city. The population density was 2,707.9 inhabitants per square mile (1,045.5/km^{2}). There were 29,144 housing units at an average density of 1,231.3 per square mile (475.4/km^{2}). The racial makeup of the city was 67.9% White, 17.6% African American, 0.5% Native American, 0.4% Asian, 8.3% from other races, and 5.4% from two or more races. Hispanic or Latino of any race were 25.2% of the population, over 19% is made up of Puerto Ricans.

There were 25,529 households, of which 33.7% had children under the age of 18 living with them, 37.1% were married couples living together, 21.0% had a female householder with no husband present, 6.1% had a male householder with no wife present, and 35.9% were non-families. 30.8% of all households were made up of individuals, and 11.5% had someone living alone who was 65 years of age or older. The average household size was 2.48 and the average family size was 3.09.

The median age in the city was 36.8 years. 26.7% of residents were under the age of 18; 8.8% were between the ages of 18 and 24; 24.6% were from 25 to 44; 26% were from 45 to 64; and 13.9% were 65 years of age or older. The gender makeup of the city was 47.5% male and 52.5% female.

== Economy ==
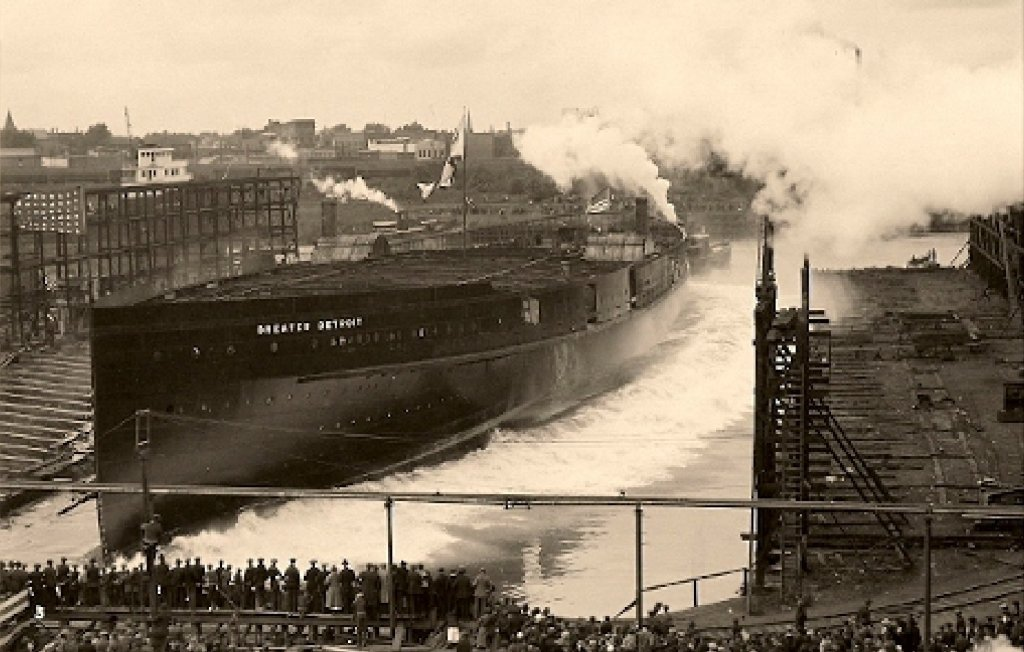
Launching of the SS Greater Detroit in Lorain, 1923

Lorain has a deindustrialized economy and was home to the American Ship Building Company Lorain Yard, Ford Motor Company Lorain Assembly Plant, and United States Steel Corporation's steel mill on the city's south side. Smaller industries included Thew Shovel and Lorain Products Corporation. The city faces many similar issues to other Rust Belt cities, including population decline and urban decay. Poverty in the city is above the national average at 26.2%, lower than Cleveland's 36%. but higher than neighboring Elyria's 22.2%

CenturyTel of Ohio is based in Lorain.

=== Top employers ===
According to the city's 2013 Comprehensive Annual Financial Report, the top employers in the city are:

#	Employer	# of employees
1	Mercy Health	1,657
2	Lorain City School District	870
3	Lorain Tubular	796
4	Republic Steel	633
5	CAMACO, Inc.	500
6	The City Of Lorain	468
7	Grace Management Services	314
8	Cleveland Clinic	300
9	The Nord Center	228
10	Walmart	211

== Arts and culture ==
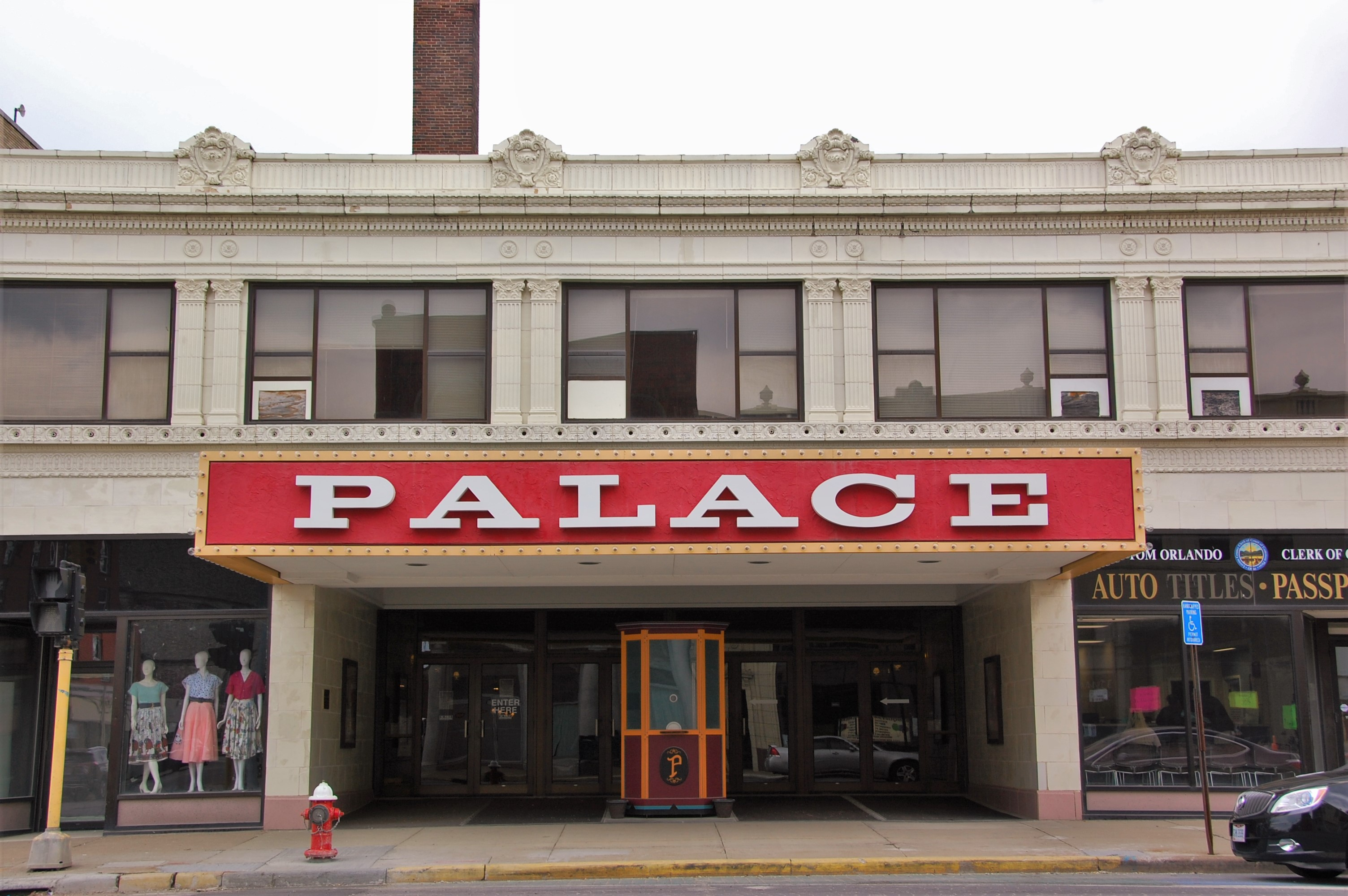
Lorain Palace Theatre

The Lorain International Festival is an annual summer festival featuring a pageant. The Fire Fish Festival is an annual September event to support the independent artists and celebrate Lorain's heritage while giving hope for the future.

The Lorain Palace Theatre opened in 1928 and continues operating. The Lorain Historical Society (formerly named Black River Historical Society) has been in operation since 1981, and seeks to preserve Lorain's rich history through exhibits, programs, and research.

== Parks and recreation ==
There are 51 parks managed by the city parks and recreation department, a total of 583 acres.

Lakeview Park is bisected by West Erie Avenue, with the northern section being managed by the Lorain County Metro Parks and the southern by the city. The park was established in 1917 under Mayor Leonard M. Moore as a way of providing more publicly-accessible space on the lakefront. The park features a beach, rose garden, various recreational facilities, bathhouse, concession stand, several gazebos and picnic shelters, and lawn bowling. There is a sculpture shaped as an Easter basket built in 1935. Traditionally, families in Lorain, in celebration of Easter, take an annual photo at the basket.

The rose garden was dedicated in 1932, and has 2,500 roses in 48 beds. The shape of the garden, a wheel with eight spokes, is the Rotary International emblem in honor of the 17 community organizations that funded the garden initially, including the Lorain Rotary. The garden was restored in 2005 and roses are planted to honor and commemorate those that had ties to the community or garden itself in city history.

== Government ==
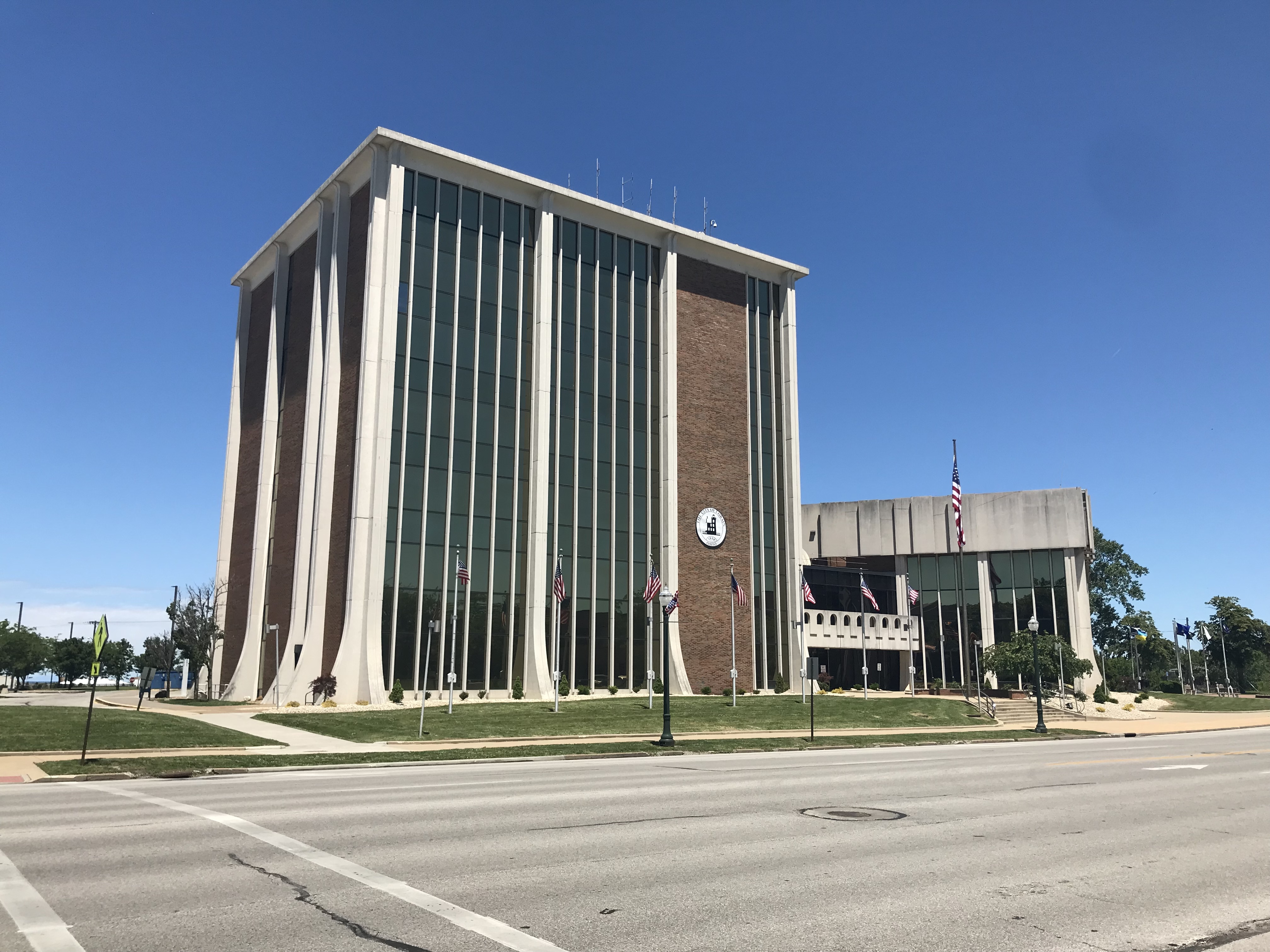
Lorain City Hall

The Lorain municipal government is a Mayor-Council structure, and operates as a statutory city under the laws and regulations set by the Ohio Constitution, making it one of the largest Ohio cities to operate without a charter. The City of Lorain operates on a ward-based system. Elected positions include the mayor, eleven City Council members, the Council President, Auditor, Treasurer, Law Director, Clerk of Courts, and two judges.

The mayor functions as the chief of the executive branch, with job duties including: determining city laws, spurring economic development, planning and administering city projects, delivering city services, negotiating city contracts, and budgeting. As of January 1, 2020, Jack Bradley is mayor.

The City Council consists of 11 members; eight members are elected by ward and three members are elected at-large, with one council member presiding as the President of Council. The Lorain City Council responsibilities include: determining the salary of city officials and employees, enacting ordinances and resolutions of city services, enacts tax levies, appropriating and borrowing money, licensing, regulating business, commerce, and other municipal duties. Council members serve two-year terms. Through the City Budget, the City Council directly controls the operation of the planning, zoning, street construction, maintenance and repair, water and sewer services, municipal court services, and general administrative services.

=== Politics ===
Politics in the city have traditionally been closely tied to the local Democratic Party. At the state level, Lorain is represented by Nathan Manning (R-North Ridgeville) of Ohio Senate District 13, and Joe Miller (D-Amherst) of Ohio House District 53. At the federal level, all of Lorain is represented by Republican U.S. Representative Bob Latta of Ohio's 5th congressional district. Lorain is represented in the United States Senate by Ohio Republicans Bernie Moreno and Jon Husted.

Voter turnout for the 2016 presidential election in Lorain was 24,198 out of a registered 40,885 voters, a voter turnout rate of 59.19%. Democratic candidate Hillary Clinton captured 15,192 votes, or 62.78%; Republican candidate Donald Trump captured 7,584 votes, or 31.34%; Independent candidate Gary Johnson captured 613 votes, or 2.53%; Green candidate Jill Stein captured 222 votes, or 0.92%. Other candidates had marginal amounts of write-in votes; additionally, it is possible that some voters did not select a presidential candidate when casting their ballot.

== Education ==
Lorain City School District operates ten elementary schools, three middle schools, and Lorain High School.

Lorain is served by the Lorain Public Library System.

== Media ==
Lorain is part of the Cleveland–Akron TV market, and is the official city of license for MyNetworkTV station WUAB, channel 43, which has its studios and offices in Cleveland along with sister station WOIO.

== Infrastructure ==
=== Transportation ===
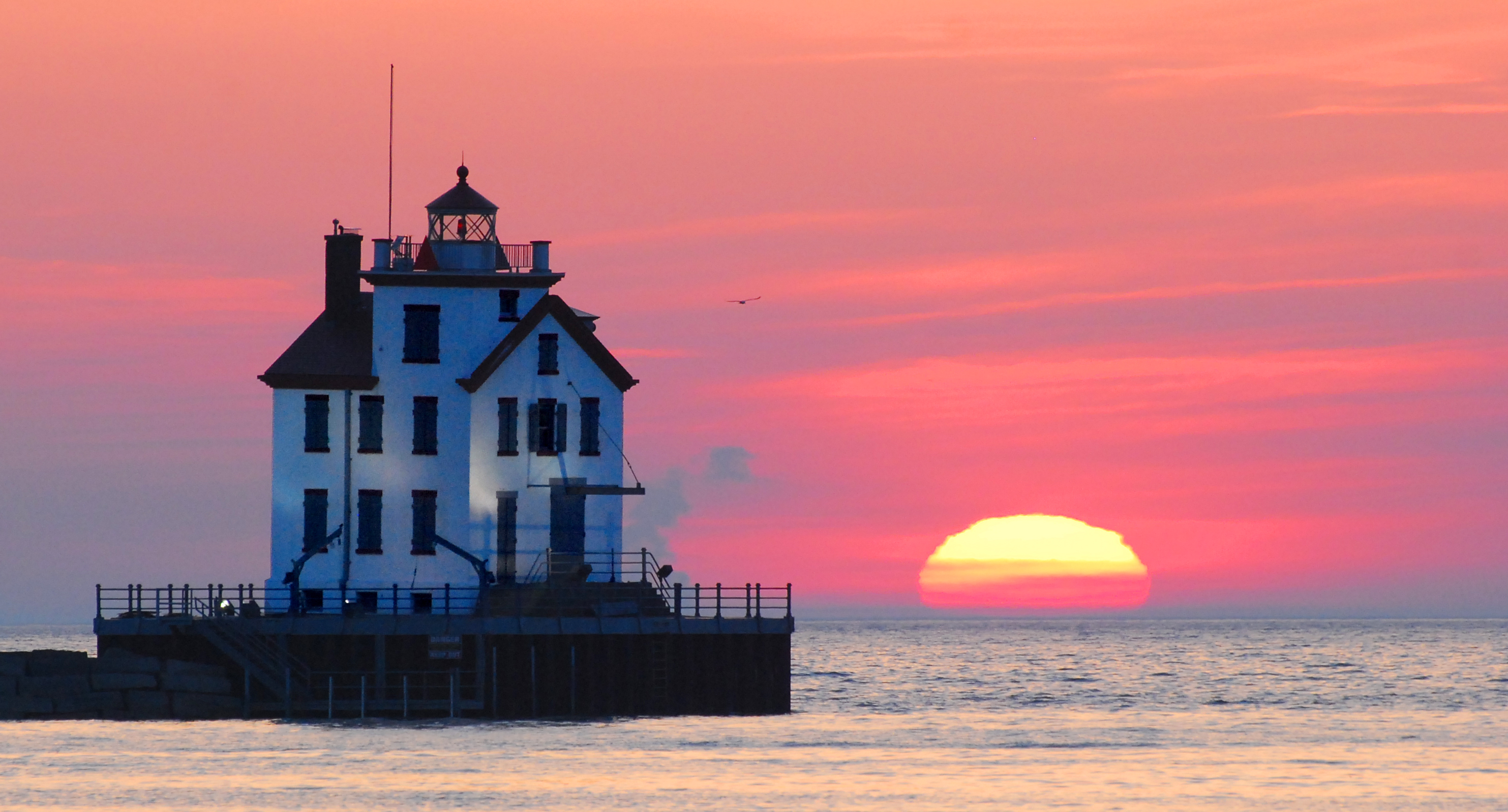
Lorain West Breakwater Light

Lorain primarily has a local street network with four state highways maintained by the Ohio Department of Transportation and one U.S. route. There are no interstate highways that pass through the city limits. Public transit is provided by Lorain County Transit, which operates two fixed-route bus lines. Norfolk Southern Railway operates a freight railroad running parallel to the Lake Erie shoreline.

==== Public transit ====
Lorain County Transit operates two fixed-route bus lines in Lorain, designated as 1 and 2. 1 runs along Washington Avenue to and from Downtown Commons (formerly Meridian Plaza), in downtown Lorain, and the LifeSkills Center in Elyria, operating one bus in each direction bi-hourly on weekdays, while route 2 likewise operates with the same points, but operates along Broadway. Additionally, Lorain is also served by "Via LC", a demand-responsive microtransit service operating under partnership with Via Transportation.

LCT additionally formerly operated bus routes 31, 41, 42, and 43 in Lorain. 3 of which connected as a terminus point at the now-defunct Super Kmart. 31 operated along North Ridge and Cooper Foster Park Road to and from Elyria, 41 originally operated along West Erie and Oberlin Avenues in Lorain, which eventually split into two routes; designating 42 for the latter; the former additionally operated to and from the Lorain Hospital. 43 operated as a loop service along the central and west sides of Lorain on a loop on weekdays. The four routes were shut down in January 2010 as a result of funding shortfalls.

==== Highways ====
- U.S. Route 6 runs east–west along Erie Avenue, crossing the northern section of the City along the Lake Erie shoreline. U.S.-6 enters the city in the east from Sheffield Lake and continues west to Vermilion.
- Ohio State Route 2 briefly runs east–west through city limits at the Broadway Avenue/Middle Ridge Road Diamond interchange (exit 166).
- Ohio State Route 57 generally runs north–south, starting in the north at the intersection of Erie Avenue and Broadway Avenue. SR-57 runs south along Broadway until 28th Street, where the route then turns east and crosses South Lorain along the southern border of the steel mill. SR-57 turns south on Grove Avenue and continues south toward Elyria.
- Ohio State Route 58 runs north–south, starting in the north at the intersection of Erie Avenue and North Leavitt Road and continuing south toward Amherst.
- Ohio State Route 611 runs east–west, starting in the west at the partial interchange of Erie Avenue and West 21st Street and continuing east until Colorado Avenue, where it turns east and continues toward Sheffield Village.

==== Bridges ====
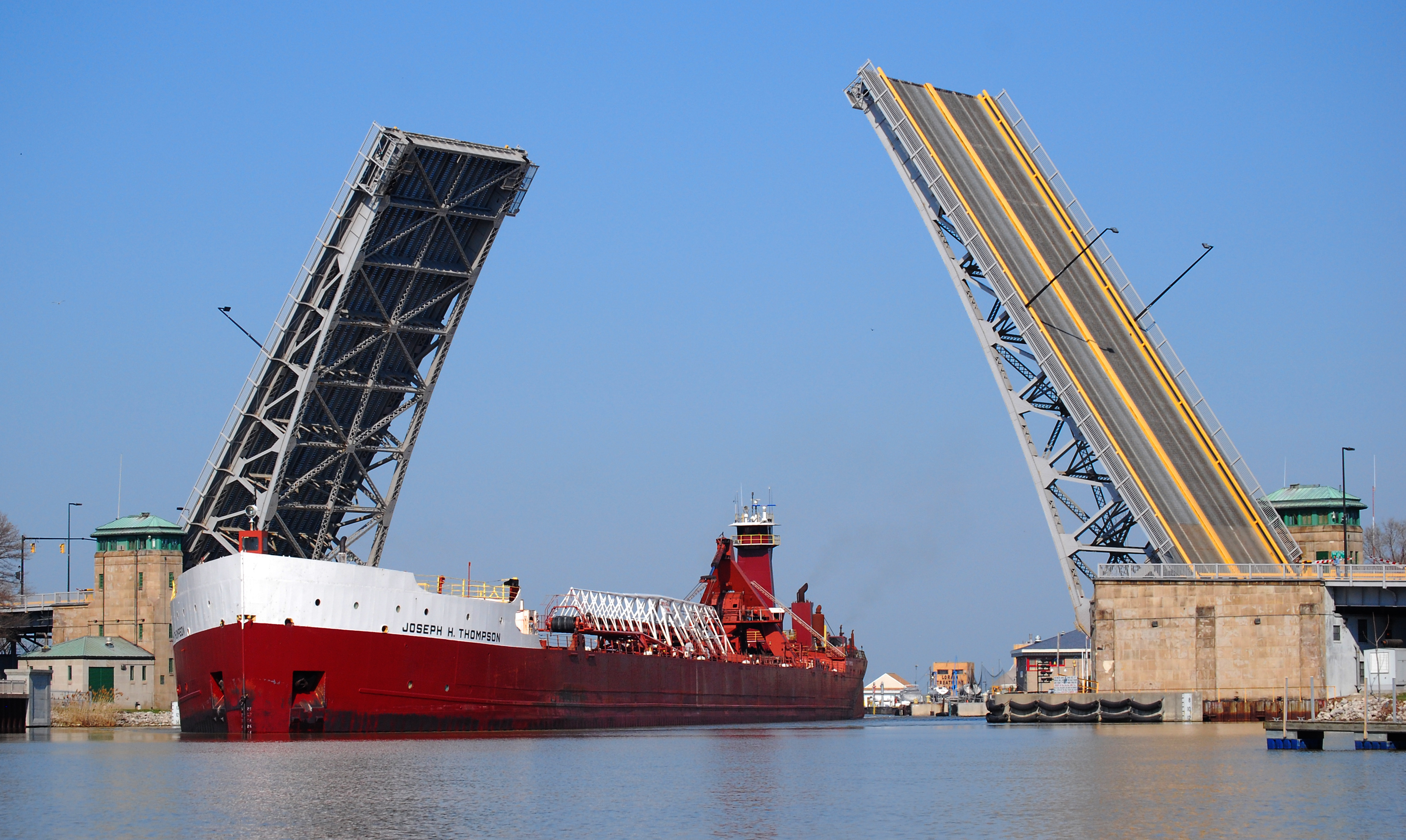
Charles Berry Bridge

There are three bridges that cross the Black River in the Lorain Harbor; two of these bridges are for motor vehicles and pedestrians and one is for rail transport only. The two motor vehicle/pedestrian bridges are the Charles Berry Bridge and the Lofton Henderson Memorial Bridge.These two bridges, formerly known as the Erie Avenue Bridge and 21st Street Bridge, respectively, opened on October 12, 1940. At the time of opening, they were coined the "Twin Bridges."

The Charles Berry Bridge is a double-leaf 1,052-foot (321-meter) bascule bridge; of the total length, 333 feet (101 meters) are the bascule span. At the time of construction, the bridge was the largest bascule bridge in the world and is now often credited as the second-largest in the world. Annually, the Charles Berry Bridge has an average of 700 openings.

The rail bridge, historically known as the 11th Street Bridge, is a single-track vertical-lift truss bridge operated by the Norfolk-Southern Railway and constructed in 1974.

=== Police ===
The Lorain Police Department was established in 1853 and has 113 police officers and 34 civilian employees.

On July 23, 2025 an ambush-like conflict occurred where three Lorain Police officers were shot by an armed gunman. Two police officers were parked eating lunch when the shooter opened fire. A third police officer responding to the call was also shot. The suspect was pronounced dead at the scene. Lorain Police Officer Philip C. Wagner was killed by injuries sustained during the incident.

== Notable people ==
- Terry Anderson, journalist and former Lebanese hostage
- Dimitra Arliss, actress
- Don Barden, Detroit businessman, Lorain's first black city councilman
- Charles J. Berry, Corporal, recipient of the Medal of Honor during World War II
- Rashod Berry, Professional Football Player
- Martha Chase, geneticist, died in Lorain in 2003
- Michael Dirda, Pulitzer Prize–winning book critic
- Stevan Dohanos, artist
- Ruth Anna Fisher, historian and teacher
- Ralph Flanagan, big band leader, pianist, composer, and arranger
- Gerald Freedman, theatre director, librettist, and lyricist, and a college dean
- Robert Galambos, researcher who discovered how bats use echolocation
- Quincy Gillmore, general
- Bruce Givner, played a minor role on the evening of the Watergate burglary
- Diane Grob Schmidt, 2015 president of the American Chemical Society
- Ellen Hanley, singer
- William Hanley, author
- Raymont Harris, NFL running back
- Lofton R. Henderson, US Marine Corps major, a hero of the Battle of Midway
- Anthony Hitchens, college and NFL linebacker
- JoBea Way Holt, planetary scientist
- Ross Kananga, stuntman and actor
- Ernest J. King, Chief of Naval Operations and Fleet Admiral of the U.S. Atlantic Fleet in World War II
- Mary Lawrence, film and television actress
- Ray Lawrence, bandleader, record company executive, record producer and personal manager
- Samuel Little, serial killer
- Marie McMillin, aviator, world record parachutist and member of Women's Army Corps
- Sam McPheeters, singer of Born Against
- Jason Molina, singer-songwriter
- Toni Morrison, Nobel Prize laureate author
- Chad Muska, professional skateboarder
- Don Novello, aka Father Guido Sarducci, comedian featured on Saturday Night Live
- Frank O'Connor, actor, painter, husband of novelist-philosopher Ayn Rand
- Robert F. Overmyer, colonel in the United States Marine Corps, test pilot and astronaut
- Martha Piper, former chancellor and president of the University of British Columbia
- Helen Steiner Rice, author and poet
- Pam Robinson, co-founder of the American Copy Editors Society
- Paige Summers, pornographic actress & model
- Ward Van Orman, three-time winner of the Gordon Bennett Race
- Vince Villanucci, NFL player
- Bruce Weigl, prize-winning poet
- Matt Wilhelm, Former football player and broadcaster
- Johnnie E. Wilson, US Army four-star general

== In popular culture ==
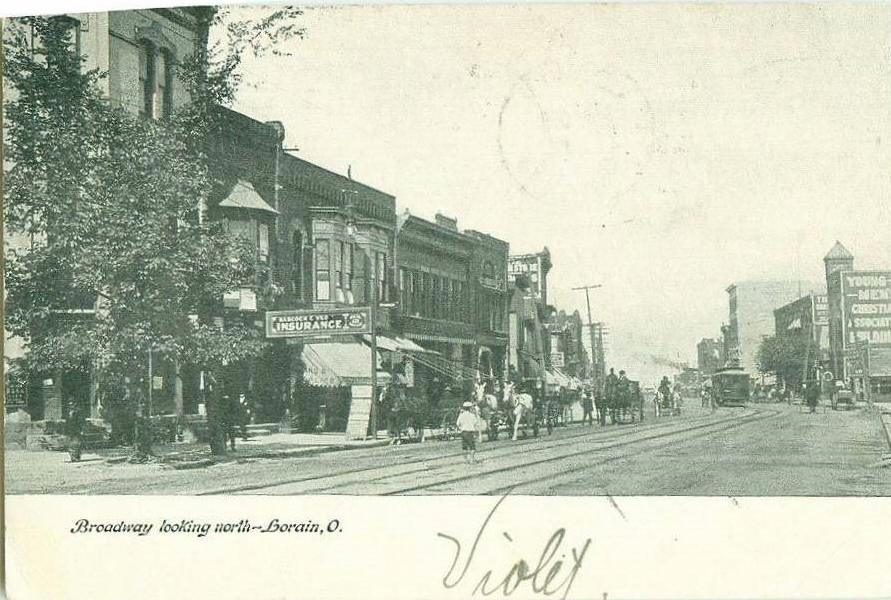
Broadway, looking north, c. 1908

Lorain is the setting for Lorain-born Toni Morrison's first novel, The Bluest Eye, where she writes:

In that young and growing Ohio town whose side streets, even, were paved with concrete, which sat on the edge of a calm blue lake, which boasted an affinity with Oberlin, the underground railroad station, just thirteen miles away, this melting pot on the lip of America facing the cold but receptive Canada—What could go wrong?

== See also ==
- Lorain National Bank
