= Lorain National Bank =

LNB Bancorp, Inc.
- Industry: Banking
- Founded: 1905; 121 years ago
- Defunct: August 14, 2015; 10 years ago
- Fate: Acquired by Northwest Bank
- Headquarters: Lorain, Ohio
- Key people: Daniel E. Klimas; (President & CEO); James R. Herrick; (Chairman); James H. Nicholson; (CFO)
- Total assets: $1.236 billion (2014)
- Total equity: $0.115 billion (2014)
- Number of employees: 272 (2014)

The Lorain National Bank was a bank headquartered in Lorain, Ohio. The bank was a subsidiary of LNB Bancorp, a bank holding company. It operated 20 branches, all of which were in Lorain County, Cuyahoga County, or Summit County. In 2015, the bank was acquired by Northwest Bank.

== History ==
The bank was founded in 1905 as Lorain Banking Co. In 1961, it merged with the National Bank of Lorain to form Lorain National Bank.

In February 2005, Daniel Klimas became president & chief executive officer of the bank. In 2007, the bank acquired Morgan Bancorp for $26.5 million in cash and stock.

In December 2008, the bank received a $25.2 million investment from the United States Department of the Treasury as part of the Troubled Asset Relief Program. The bank remained under partial government ownership until 2012.

In 2015, the bank was acquired by Northwest Bank.
