= Lofton Henderson Memorial Bridge =

- Coordinates: 41°27′27″N 82°09′37″W
- Carries: SR 611 (Henderson Drive)
- Crosses: Black River
- Locale: Lorain County, Ohio
- Official name: Lofton Henderson Memorial Bridge
- Other name(s): 21st Street Bridge
- Named for: Lofton R. Henderson
- Maintained by: Ohio Department of Transportation

Characteristics
- Material: Steel
- Pier construction: concrete
- Total length: 1,704 feet
- Longest span: 390 feet
- No. of lanes: 4

History
- Engineering design by: American Bridge Company
- Constructed by: American Bridge Company
- Opened: 1939

Statistics
- Daily traffic: 14,310 vehicles per day (2011)

Lofton Henderson Memorial Bridge (formerly, 21st Street Bridge or Central High Level Bridge ) is a cantilever truss bridge that carries Ohio State Route 611 (Henderson Drive) over the Black River in Lorain, Ohio.

The High-Level Bridge was proposed in 1937 as a bypass to the notoriously congested Erie Avenue swing bridge. Designed by Wilbur J. Watson & Associates of Cleveland and constructed by the American Bridge Company, at a cost of $1.7 million, it opened in conjunction with the new Erie Avenue bascule bridge on September 26, 1940. The High-Level Bridge was named for Lofton Henderson in October 1991.
