= Charles Berry Bridge =

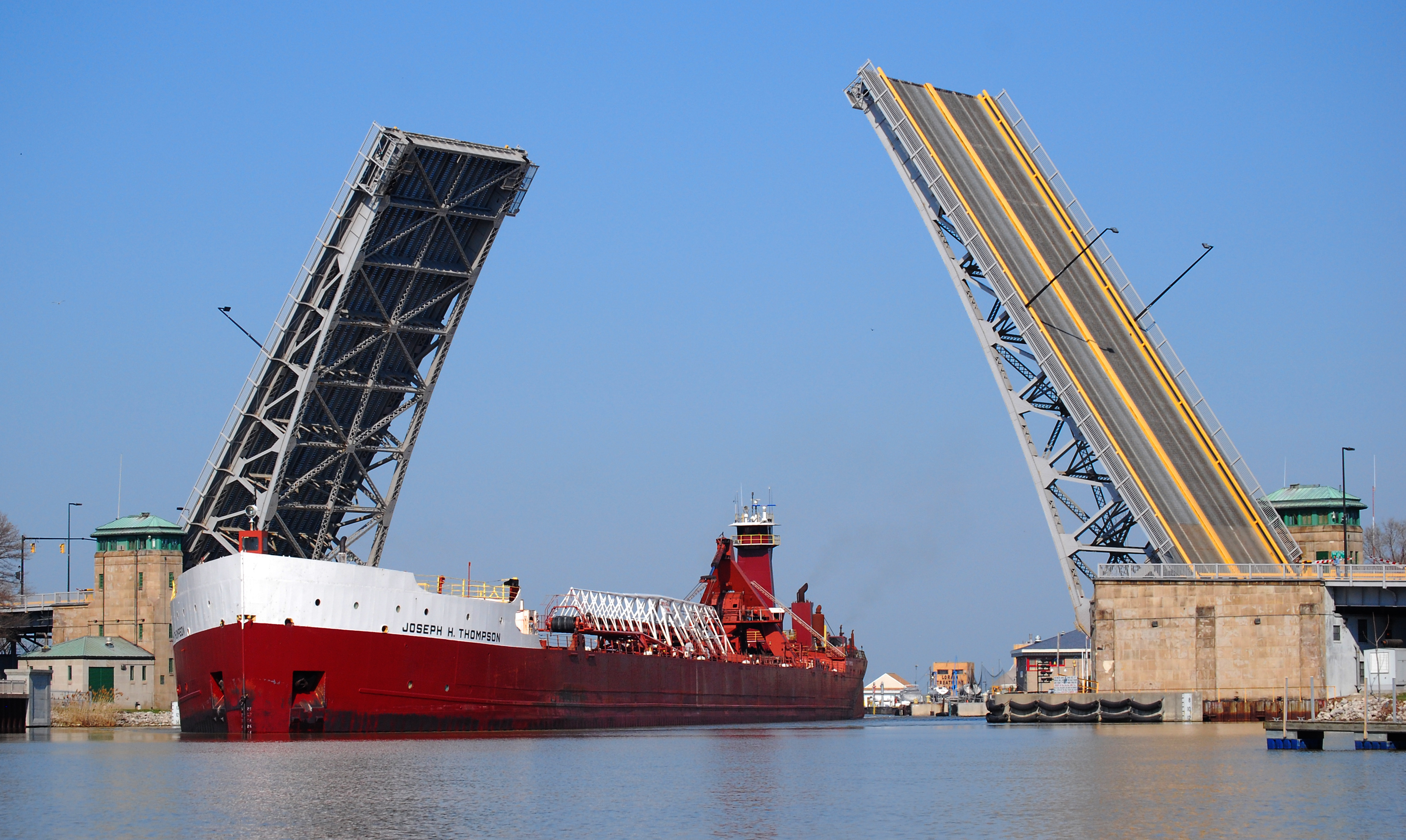
- Coordinates: 41.469762°N 82.175441°W
- Carries: US 6
- Crosses: Black River
- Locale: Lorain, Ohio
- Official name: Erie Avenue Bridge

Characteristics
- Design: Bascule

The Charles Berry Bridge is a double leaf bascule bridge in Lorain, Ohio along Erie Avenue / U.S. Route 6 (US 6) and spans the Black River.

== History ==
The Erie Avenue Bridge (as it was formerly called) was built in 1940. Bridge construction was funded by a bond issue in Lorain County with financial assistance with a Public Works Administration grant. Wilbur Watson and Associates with Lorain County Engineer H.L. Dunham oversaw design and construction. Components of the bridge were constructed by different companies, including the Great Lakes Dredge and Dock Company, the Mt. Vernon Bridge and Iron Company, and the Dingle Clark Company.

Before the bascule bridge, the city relied on a swing bridge for car and foot traffic between the east and west sides of Lorain. The swing bridge remained in use while the bascule bridge was being built which limited the area available during construction and subsequently impacted where the bascule bridge's operating machinery was installed.

The bridge is thought to be the second longest bascule bridge in the world, with sources citing that it was considered the longest at the time of construction. Some sources argue that this designation is challenging to confirm because of the different styles of bascule bridges and methods in how they are measured, with conflicting information existing on which bridges are the longest and why from different sources.

=== Renaming to Charles Berry Bridge ===
The bridge was officially renamed in 1988 and dedicated in honor of Lorain native Charles J. Berry, a Marine who was awarded the Medal of Honor for his actions during a minor grenade battle on Iwo Jima. The bascule bridge is one of two bridges in Lorain used for pedestrian and automobile traffic. The second bridge is the Lofton Henderson Memorial Bridge which was named after Lorainite Lofton Henderson who was awarded the Navy Cross for his heroism at the historic Battle of Midway.

=== Maintenance and upkeep ===
The Ohio Department of Transportation (ODOT) agreed in 1989 to cover funding for the bridge which saves Lorain County nearly half a million US dollars per year. The Charles Berry Bridge is one of only three bridges in Ohio that the ODOT will currently fund.

== See also ==
- The Ashtabula lift bridge, another bascule bridge in Ohio
