= Black River (Ohio) =

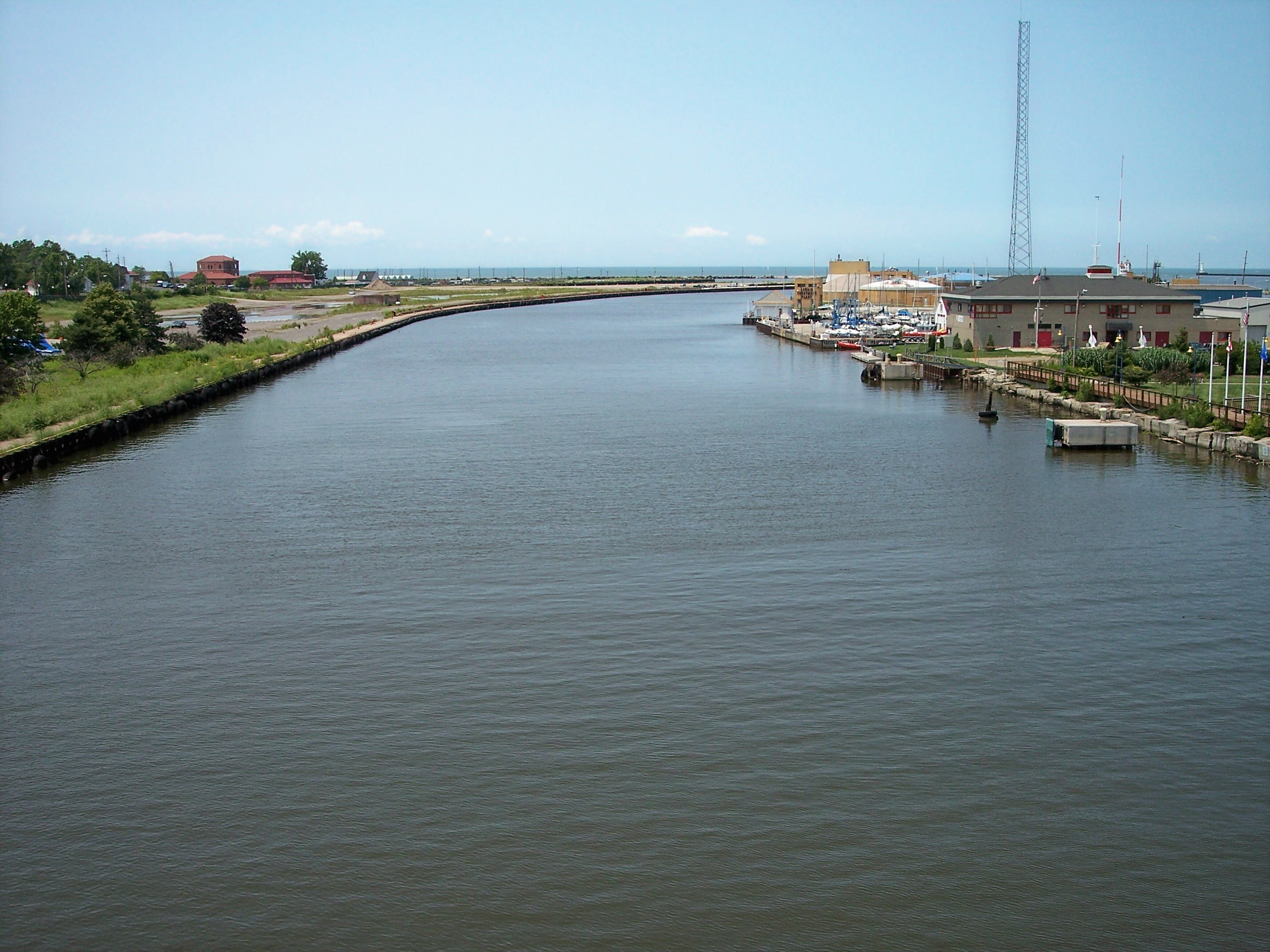
- The Black River at its mouth at Lake Erie in Lorain

Location
- Country: United States of America

Physical characteristics
- Source
  - location: Elyria, Ohio, at confluence of East and West Branches, or northern Ashland County, Ohio for West Branch
- Mouth
  - location: Lake Erie in Lorain, Ohio
- Length: 12 mi (19 km), or about 42 miles (68 km) including West Branch
- Basin size: 470 mi^{2} (1,200 km^{2})

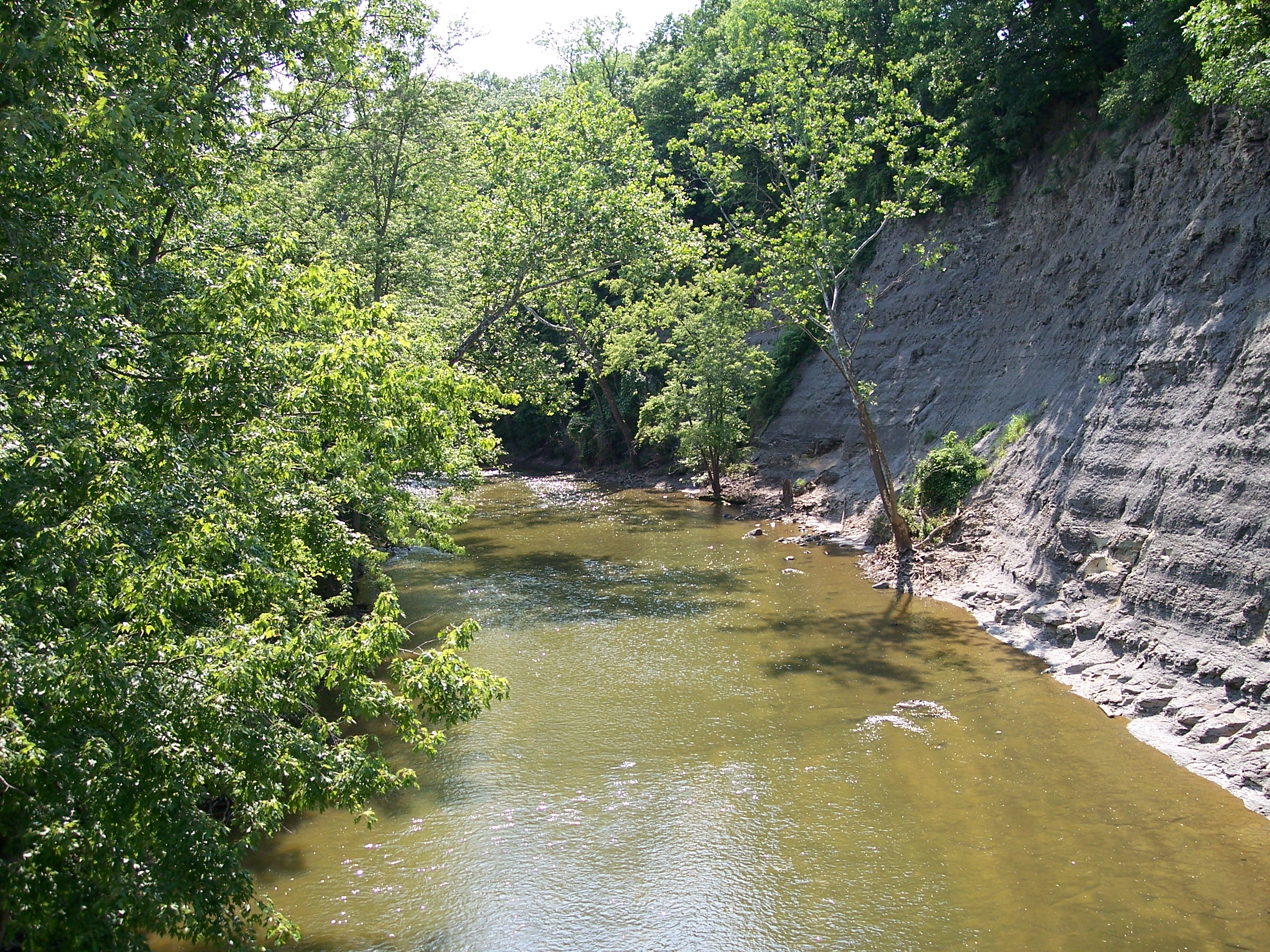
Shale cliffs along the Black River in the Lorain County Metroparks' Black River Reservation in Elyria

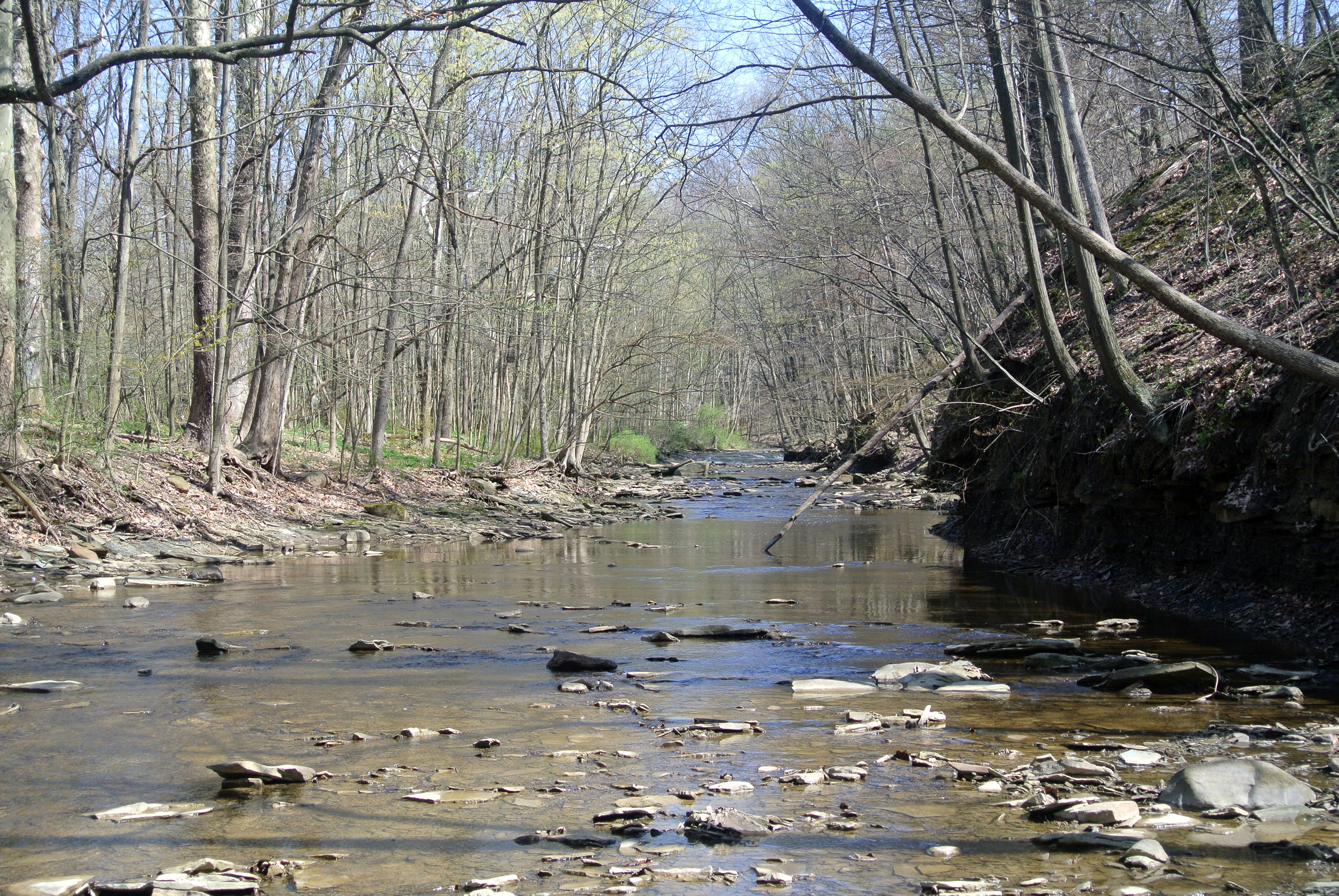
East Fork of the Black River flowing through Lodi, Ohio.

The Black River is a 12-mile (19 km) long tributary of Lake Erie located in Lorain County, Ohio in the United States. The City of Elyria sits on the banks of this river and via Lake Erie, the Niagara River and Lake Ontario, the Black River is part of the watershed of the St. Lawrence River, which flows to the Atlantic Ocean.

== Watershed ==
The Black River drains an area of 470 mi^{2} (1217 km^{2}). The river is formed in the city of Elyria by the confluence of its east and west branches:

- The East Branch Black River is formed in northwestern Medina County by the confluence of two short tributaries, the East Fork Black River and the West Fork East Branch Black River. The East Fork flows southwardly past Lodi before turning northwestwardly, and the West Fork rises in northeastern Ashland County and flows generally eastwardly into Medina County; the two join about 1 mi (2 km) northwest of Lodi, and the East Branch then flows generally northwardly into Lorain County, past Grafton. It drains an area of 222 mi^{2} (575 km^{2}).
- The West Branch Black River, about 30 mi (48 km) long, rises in northern Ashland County and flows generally northeastwardly into Lorain County, past Rochester. It drains an area of 174 mi^{2} (451 km^{2}).

From the confluence of the branches in Elyria, the Black River flows generally northwardly past Sheffield into the city of Lorain, where it enters Lake Erie at 41°28′20″N 82°10′58″W. The mouth of the river forms part of the harbor of Lorain.

== Etymology ==
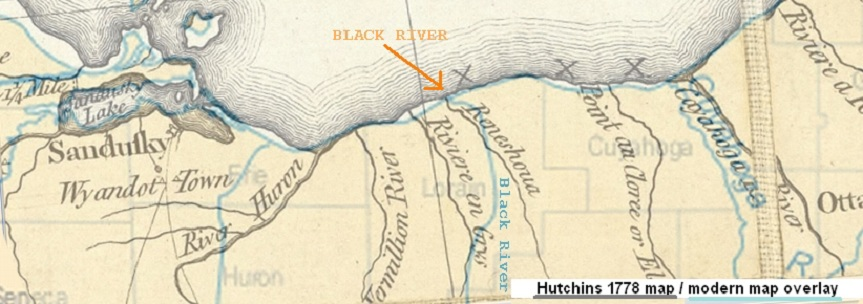
Reneshoua River in 1778

According to the Geographic Names Information System, the Black River was formerly named "Canesadooharie River" and "Riviere en Grys." (These two historical names were actually originally intended to refer to nearby rivers, instead of the Black River.)

In the 1700s, the Black River was known as the "Reneshoua River", and was also referred to as "la Riviere de la Cuiliere" by early French and British explorers. The origin of those names is uncertain, although "Cuilliere" was also the name of a French fur-trader who frequented the Lake Erie shore areas about 1760.

== History ==
This river became well known by the early European explorers, as being the safest harboring spot at the western end of "the cliffs" which extended many miles along the southern Lake Erie shore from this river almost to the Cuyahoga River's mouth, and in the 1700s these cliffs had almost no beach areas for landing even a small boat, and were too high and steep to climb.

In 1787, the Moravian missionary, David Zeisberger, led a group of Christian-converted Native-Americans from their settlement on the Cuyahoga River, to a new intended settlement probably on the Black River*, about 5 or 6 miles upstream from Lake Erie. However, after remaining only twelve days, the group was prevented from settling here due to warnings by a local Native-American tribe ( about potential dangers from the inevitable "white" settlers), and so the group instead relocated to the Huron River, in (now) Milan, Ohio. (*-Zeisberger did not specifically record the name of the river of their brief stay, but merely that it was "halfway between" the Cuyahoga and Huron Rivers.)

The Black River has two impressive falls in the city of Elyria Ohio, these falls having been the reason that nineteenth-century historians concluded that the Black River was the "Canesadooharie," the river upon which James Smith encamped with Native Americans, in 1755 and 1756. There exists some speculation that the river Smith referred to was the Huron River. Its Native-American name was phonetically interpreted by other European explorers as "Guahadahuri." The only original source for the word "Canesadooharie" was Col. James Smith (captured by Native-Americans and brought to live among them near Sandusky Bay), who had written about his visit to the "falls" on the river "Canesadooharie." Historians have guessed that the falls of which Smith spoke might have been the same falls in the (now) city of Elyria. Subsequently, other historians surmised that the very word "Canesadooharie" might translate to "black pearl," or even more romantically to "string of black pearls," apparently giving further credence to the notion that the "Canesadooharie" referred to the Black River. Inconsistencies in Smith's account raise some questions. The single "falls" Smith describes were "12 to 15 feet high, and nearly perpendicular". However, both of the individual falls near the City of Elyria are much larger—about 40 feet in height and absolutely perpendicular. These two Black River falls are very near one another, within easy walking distance, and any person spending several weeks fishing and hunting in the area, as Smith did, would not likely have overlooked the other falls here. The single falls which Smith experienced over a period of many weeks may have been merely very steep rapids somewhere in the vicinity of (now) Milan, Ohio, but time and nature could have altered them beyond recognition, even by the mid-1800s. Nevertheless, in the original edition of Smith's account, he notes that the "Canesadooharie" was "about 8 miles east of Sandusky or betwixt Sandusky and Cayahaga (the Cuyahoga River); the Black River is approximately midway between the Sandusky and the Cuyahoga. Smith also notes that the Canesadooharie "interlocks with the West Branch of the Muskingum." Potentially, this could refer to the relatively short portage between the Huron River and the Black Fork of the Mohican River, which connects into the Muskingum. Just as likely, Smith could be referring to the even shorter portage between the Black River and Killbuck Creek.

"Riviere en Grys" (another GNIS name for the Black River) was instead originally the name of now Beaver Creek, several miles west of the Black River.

== Industrial impact and environmental remediation ==
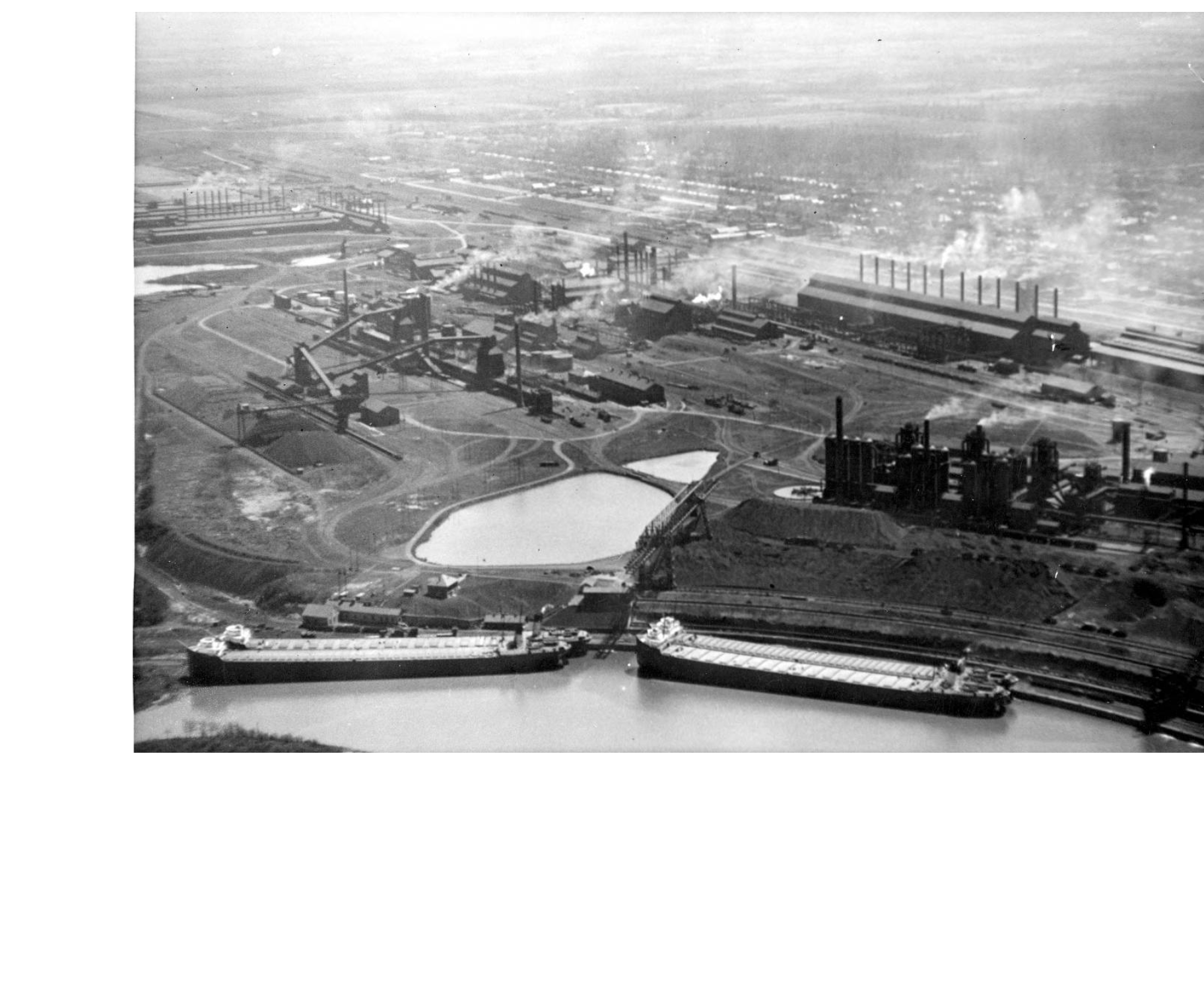
This aerial view of the Lorain Works of the National Tube Company, a subsidiary of U.S. Steel, was taken in 1975.

The Black River in the City of Lorain was widened and dredged in preparation for Johnson Steel's arrival in South Lorain. River improvement projects have been managed by the City of Lorain and, since 1964, also the Lorain Port Authority. There are three bridges that span the river in Lorain: Charles Berry Bridge, Lofton Henderson Memorial Bridge, and the Lorain Railroad Lift Bridge. In 2021, 89,000 tons of material passed through (shipped and received) the Black River.

The E.P.A. listed both branches of the Black River as an Area of Concern in 1985 due to poor water quality from industrial and waste water contamination. At one time it was referred to as the "river of tumors," however has undergone extensive remediation under the Great Lakes Restoration Initiative and is becoming more known as an active destination for recreation In 2021, the Black River AOC was removed from the "Degradation of Aesthetics beneficial use impairment," which was a significant achievement.

There were once large piles of slag leftover from the days when the steel mills (U.S. Steel and Republic Steel) were still active in Lorain. Remediation projects removed over 1 million cubic yards of steel waste, native plants planted, and wetland areas restored.

Starting in 2010, Bulkhead Fish Shelves have been installed along the banks near the mouth of the Black River in an innovative design that benefits fish while allowing boat and freighter access on the river. The project was completed in 2018 with over 3,000 linear feet of fish shelves installed.

The river is a known birdwatching destination, especially for the 200 great blue heron rookeries along the shoreline in the Cromwell Park vicinity. Lark sparrows, gulls, waterfowl, great egrets, double-crested cormorants, and bald eagles are also commonly seen.

== See also ==
- List of rivers of Ohio
