= Northwest Bank =

Pennsylvania Bank

Northwest Bancshares, Inc.
- Company type: Public
- Traded as: Nasdaq: NWBI; S&P 600 component
- Industry: Banking
- Founded: 1896; 130 years ago
- Headquarters: Warren, Pennsylvania, U.S.
- Key people: Louis J. Torchio (president & CEO); Douglas M. Schosser (CFO)
- Total assets: ▲$13.806 billion (2020)
- Total equity: ▲$1.539 billion (2020)
- Number of employees: 2,421 (2020)
- Website: www.northwest.bank

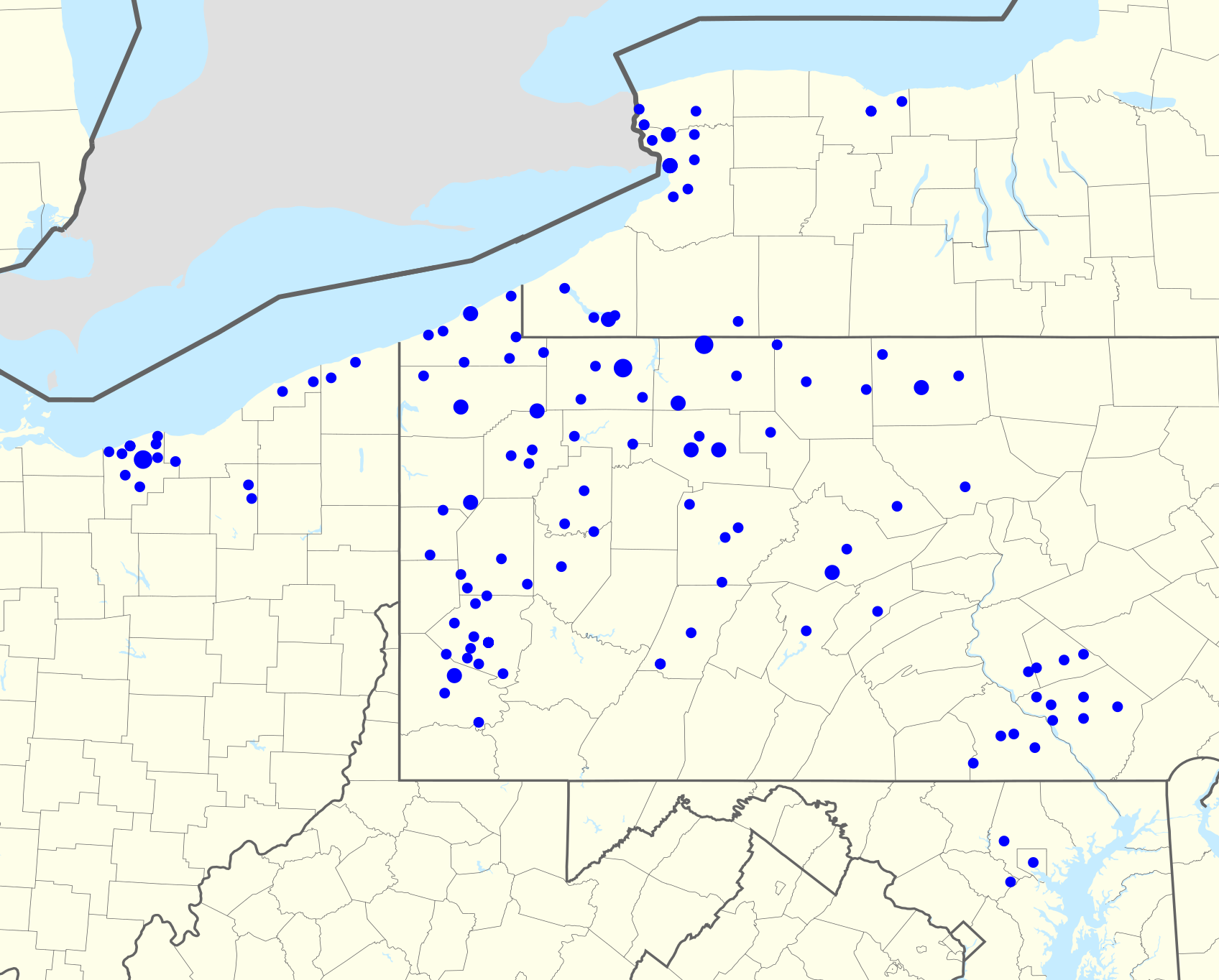
Map of Northwest Bank's branches in Western Pennsylvania as of 2016

Northwest Bank is a bank headquartered in Warren, Pennsylvania. It is the leading subsidiary of Northwest Bancshares, Inc., a bank holding company, and operates 151 branches in Pennsylvania, Western New York, Northeast Ohio, Appalachian Ohio, and Indiana.

== History ==
=== 19th century ===
The bank was founded in 1896 in Bradford, Pennsylvania. At the time, the bank was known as Northwest Mutual Savings Association.

=== 20th century ===
In 1974, the bank moved its headquarters to Warren, Pennsylvania. While still known as Northwest Mutual Savings Association, the bank acquired a number of other financial institutions including Ridgway Federal Savings and Loan Association in 1983, Mutual Savings and Loan Association in 1984, Bakerstown Savings and Loan Association in 1985, Horizon Savings Association in 1990, Steitz Savings and Loan Association in 1990, American Federal Saving in 1992, First Federal Savings Bank of Kane in 1996, The First National Bank of Centre Hall in 1996, Bridgeville Savings Bank in 1997, and Corry Savings Bank in 1998.

In 1985, the bank acquired four southwestern Pennsylvania branches from Equimark, a subsidiary of Pittsburgh-based Equibank. Ten years later, when National City Corp. acquired Integra Bank (which had itself acquired Equibank two years before), Northwest acquired eight Integra branches from National City that were either redundant or in rural areas that had low chances for growth.

In 1993, the bank changed its name for the first time when it became Northwest Savings Bank. It also changed its regulatory agency to the FDIC and became a mutual savings bank.

=== 21st century ===
On December 18, 2009, the bank converted from a mutual savings bank to a joint stock company.

In 2015, the bank changed its name to the present Northwest Bank.

In August 2015, the bank's holding company, Northwest Bancshares, Inc., merged with LNB Bancorp, Inc., in a stock and cash deal and acquired Lorain National Bank. The transaction value was approximately $179 million, and resulted in a bank with approximately $9.0 billion in total assets.

In March 2016, Northwest Bank acquired Best Insurance Agency, Inc.

On September 9, 2016, the bank acquired 18 branches in Western New York from First Niagara Bank, which was about to be acquired by KeyBank. The branches were once part of the former Marine Midland Bank.

In May 2017, Northwest Bank exited the Maryland market, selling all three remaining branch locations to locally based Shore United Bank. In 2017, the bank’s assets were valued at $9.5 billion and the bank was ranked number 134th among all banks nationally.

In April 2020, the bank acquired MutualFirst Financial, a Muncie, Indiana-based bank, in a stock and cash deal valued at $346 million. The transaction expanded Northwest's presence in Indiana, and grew the bank's number of branches to 221 across four states.

Following its MutualFirst acquisition, Northwest Bank enacted a branch optimization plan, closing 40 branches spread across several states. In 2020, the bank's assets were valued at $13.8 billion.

In February 2021, the bank remains in Warren, Pennsylvania, however the bank moved its holding company headquarters from Warren, Pennsylvania to Columbus, Ohio, relocating several key executives, including Ron Seiffert, the company's chief executive officer.

In April 2021, Northwest announced the sale of its insurance services business to USI Insurance Services, based in Valhalla, New York.

On July 25, 2025, the bank's holding company, Northwest Bancshares, Inc., merged with Penns Woods Bancorp, Inc. into Northwest Bancshares, Inc., along with Penns Woods' wholly owned subsidiary banks, Jersey Shore State Bank and Luzerne Bank, each with and into Northwest Bank, a Pennsylvania-chartered savings bank and wholly owned subsidiary of Northwest, with Northwest Bank as the surviving bank. This added 21 branch locations across North Central and Northeastern Pennsylvania, bringing the total number of branches to 151 across 4 states.
