= 1924 Sandusky–Lorain tornado =

Natural disaster in Ohio, USA

1924 Sandusky-Lorain tornado
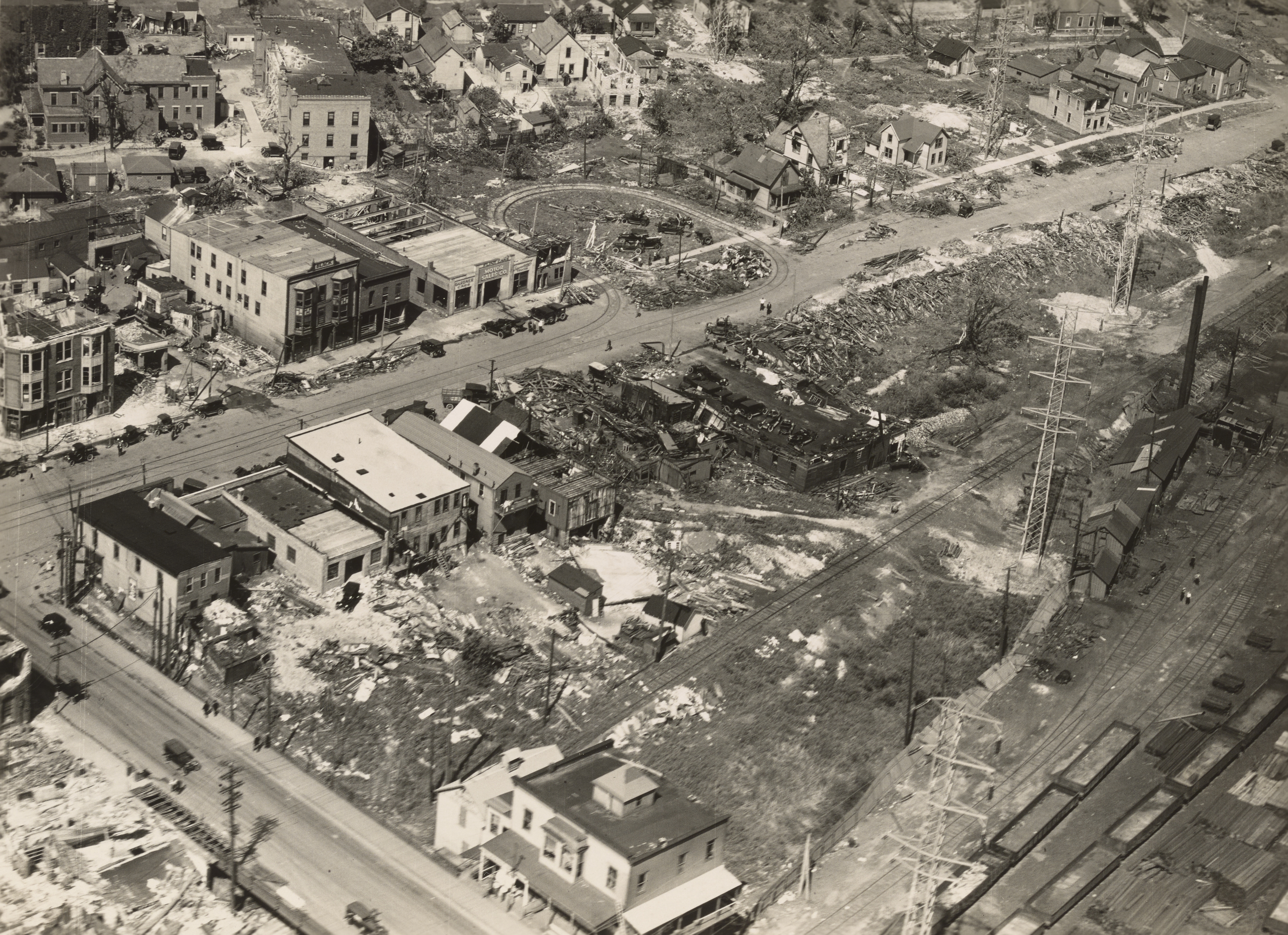
- Damage in downtown Lorain

Meteorological history
- Date: June 28, 1924

F4 tornado
- on the Fujita scale

Overall effects
- Casualties: ≥85 fatalities, ≥350 injuries
- Damage: >$12 million [1920 USD]
- Areas affected: Northern Ohio

The 1924 Sandusky–Lorain tornado was a deadly F4 tornado which struck the towns of Sandusky and Lorain, Ohio on Saturday, June 28, 1924. It remains the deadliest single tornado ever recorded in Ohio history, killing more people than the 1974 Xenia and 1985 Niles-Wheatland tornadoes combined.

== Meteorological synopsis and tornado summary ==
On that day, a low pressure system moved from Iowa towards Michigan and Ontario. Temperatures were in the lower 80s across most of northern Ohio, which is typical for late-June across that area.

The tornado formed over the Sandusky Bay during the late afternoon and hit the city of Sandusky where it killed eight and destroyed 100 homes and 25 businesses. After moving east over Lake Erie for several miles, the tornado then struck the town of Lorain just west of Cleveland, where greater than 500 houses were destroyed and 1,000 others were damaged in addition to many businesses in the downtown area. At least 72 people were killed here, including 15 people inside a collapsed theater and eight others inside the bath house at Lakeview Park where the tornado came ashore. This tornado still ranks among the deadliest in United States history.

There were uncertainties as to whether or not the Sandusky-Lorain tornado was a single tornado event due to the 25-mile path of the storm across Lake Erie between Sandusky and Lorain; however, many eyewitnesses reported a single storm crossing the lake before coming onshore again in Lorain.

Other tornadoes struck Castalia (Erie County), Huron Township (Erie County) and Geauga Lake (Portage County) in addition to Erie and Meadville in northwestern Pennsylvania. At least five additional people were killed by other tornadoes on the same day.

== Response and recovery ==
Police in Lorain were short-staffed at the time due to financial difficulties within the City and were unable to manage the situation alone. Within hours members of the Ohio National Guard were in Lorain to assist the Lorain community. Led by Brigadier General John R. McQuigg, three units composed of around 1500 guardsmen were stationed in Lorain. The Ohio National Guard established camp in the Antlers Hotel and in other available buildings. They distributed emergency tents for people who had lost homes, monitored checkpoints, and patrolled the neighborhoods to protect against looters and monitor the recovery efforts.

The search for people trapped in the wreckage of the State Theater and surrounding residential homes took days to complete.

The tornado gained national attention with accounts published in newspapers around the country, all with varying degrees of accuracy. The New York Times published an Associated Press article on June 29 which reported that 300 people were dead. Director of the Red Cross civilian relief Colonel D. H. Pond stated that they were distributing 1,000 emergency tents to relieve Lorain's citizens. The major concerns highlighted in the article included the destroyed homes and businesses, collapsed theater with trapped victims, bridges and railroads inaccessible, and as a result of looting, the city being placed under martial law. Mayors from Lorraine, France also expressed their condolences to Lorain through Myron T. Herrick, Lorain County native and Ambassador to France.

The Commission for Northern Ohio Tornado Relief organized the call for financial donations to provide aid for the communities damaged in this storm system. With advisement from the National Red Cross the organization asked for $600,000 in donations.

== See also ==
- List of North American tornadoes and tornado outbreaks

Preceded by St. Louis, MO–East St. Louis, IL (1896)	Costliest U.S. tornadoes on Record; June 28, 1924	Succeeded by Tri-State (MO, IL, & IN) (1925)
