= Lorain County Metro Parks =

Park district in Lorain County, Ohio, US

- Location: Lorain County, Ohio
- Area: 6,500 acres (2,600 ha)
- Created: 1957

The Lorain County Metroparks in Lorain County, Ohio, is one of several Metroparks systems in Ohio. It is closest in proximity to the Cleveland Metroparks system. The Lorain County Park District was formed in 1957 and has grown to cover 6,500 acres (26 km^{2}). It is supported mostly through a 1-mill property tax.

The Park District passed 50 years old in 2007.

== Gallery ==
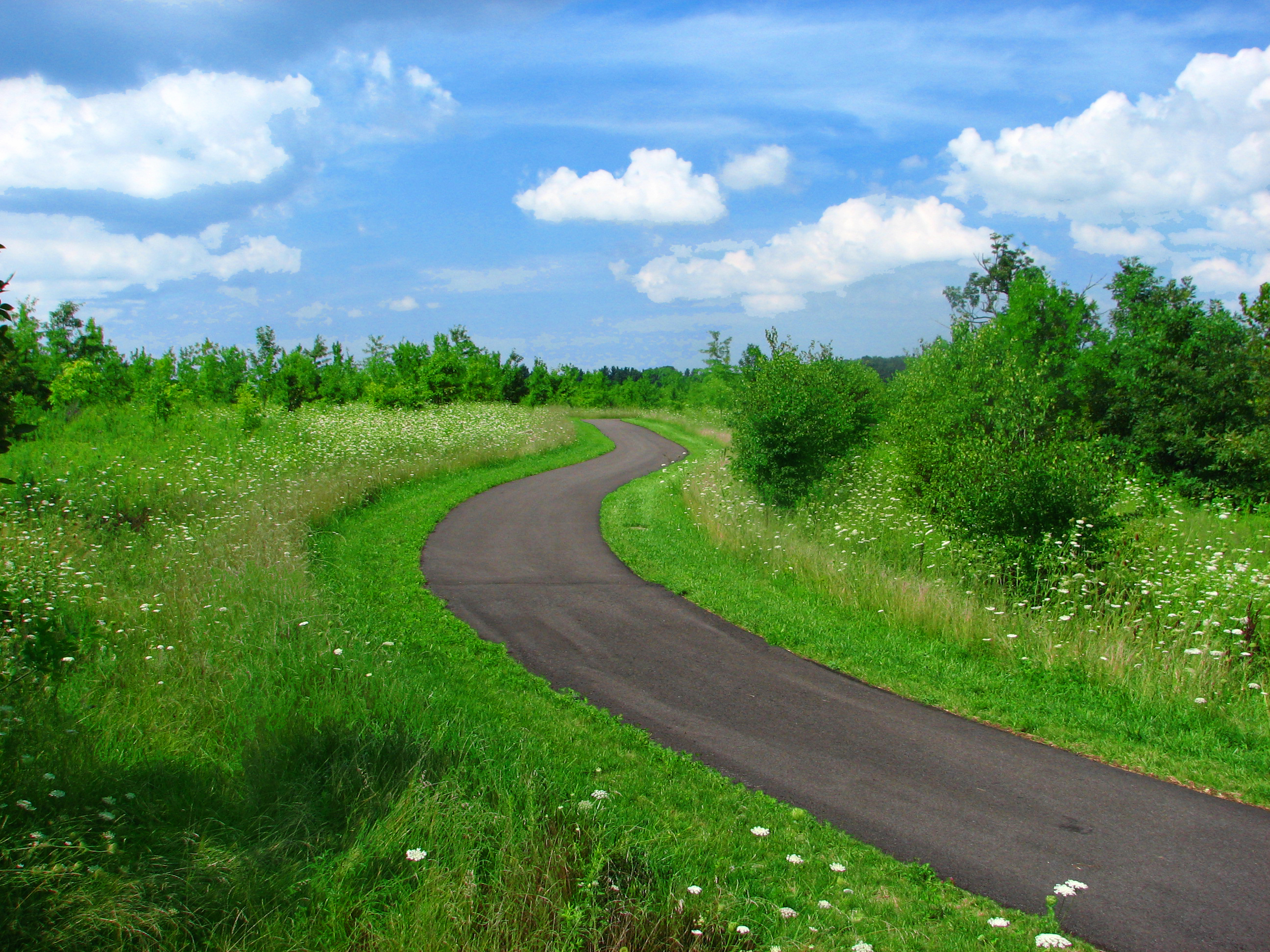
A multi-use path at the Wellington Reservation

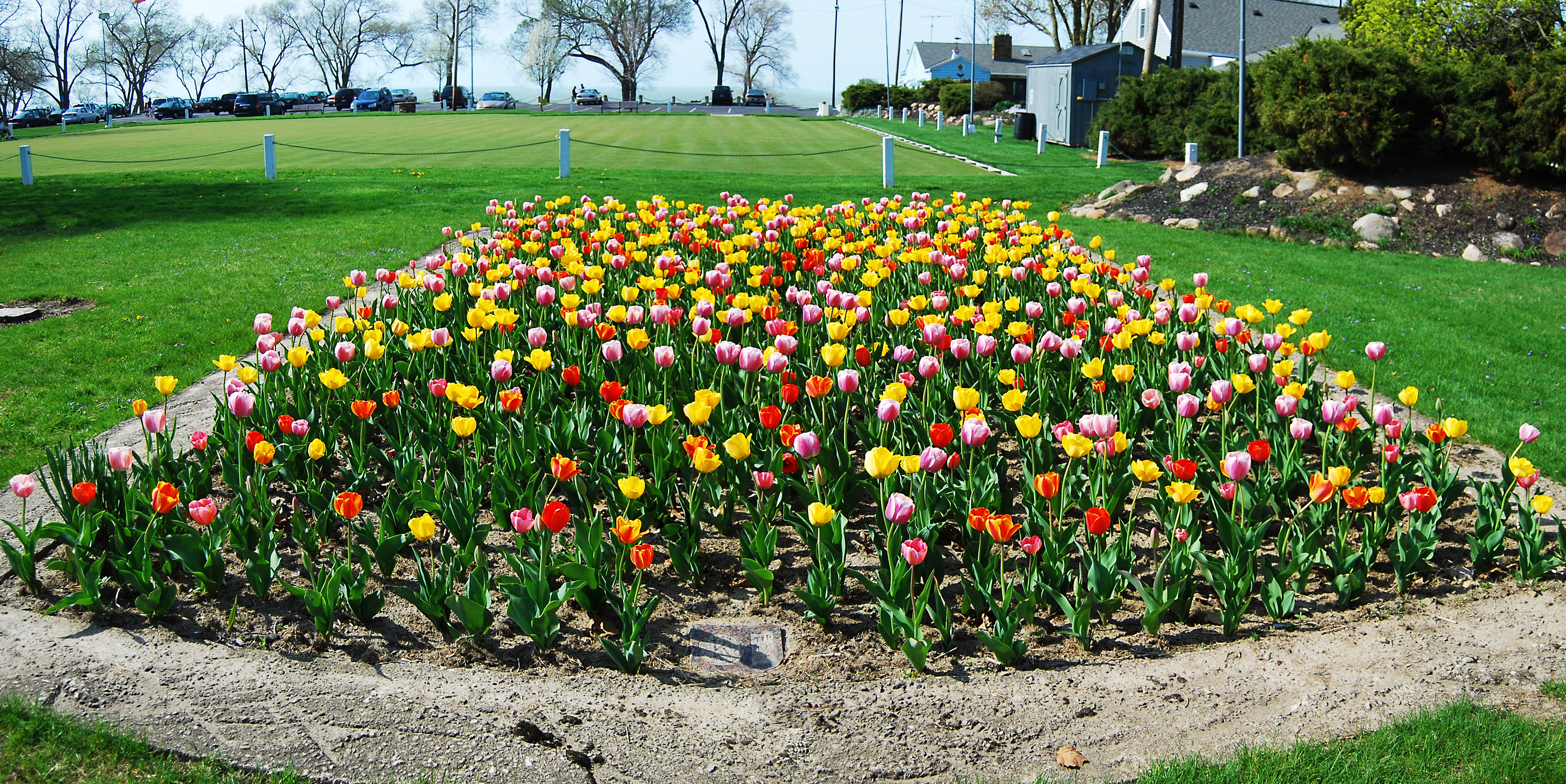
Lakeview Park tulip garden

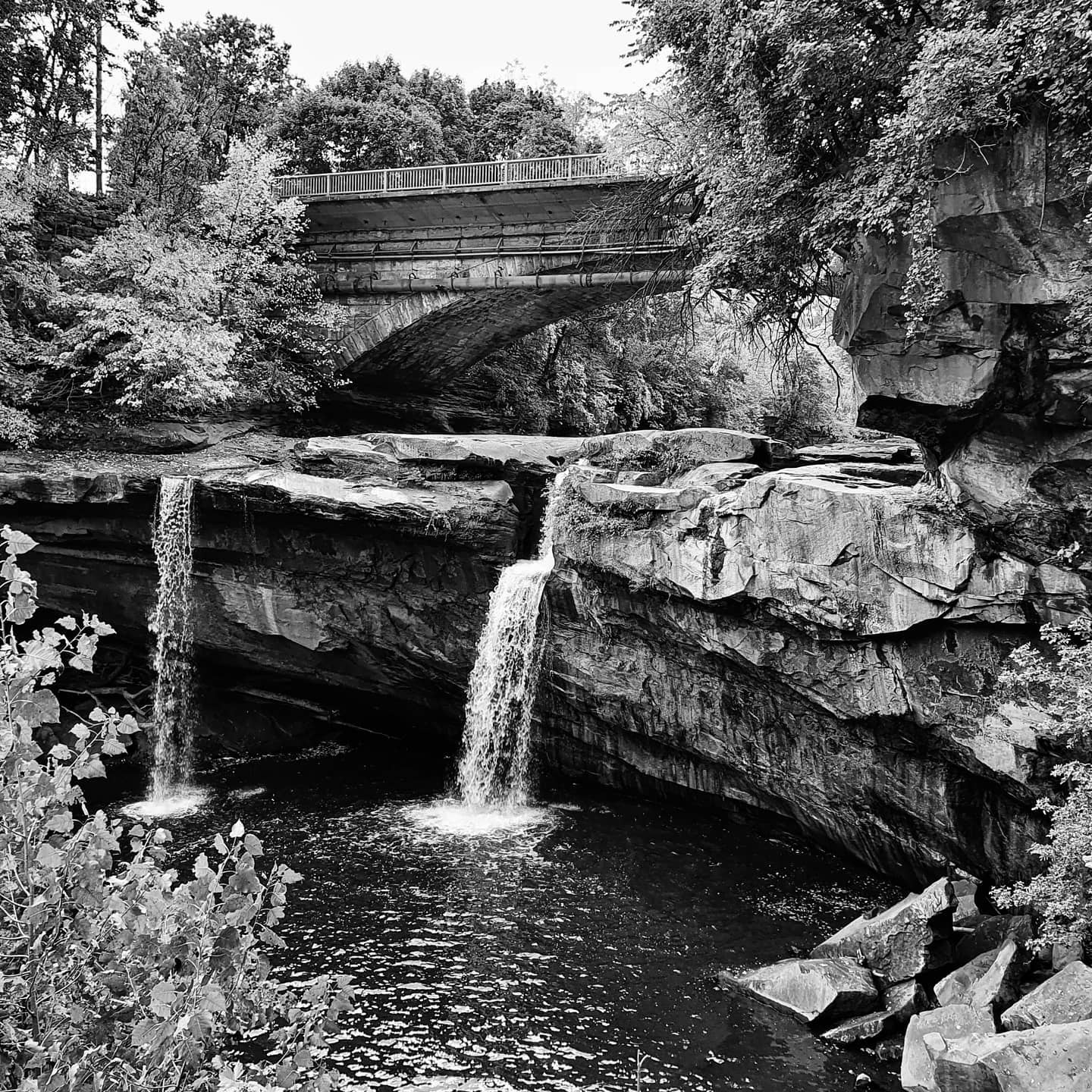
The Western Falls at Cascade Park
