= Historical components of the S&P 500 =

History of components of the S&P 500

S&P Dow Jones Indices updates the components of the S&P 500 periodically, typically in response to mergers and acquisitions, corporate spin-offs, or in conjunction with the quarterly rebalancing. Between January 1, 1963, and December 31, 2014, 1,186 index components were replaced by other components. The following is a list of historical changes to the components of the S&P 500:

| Effective Date | Added | | Removed | | Reason | Refs |
| Effective Date | Ticker | Security | Ticker | Security | Reason | Refs |
|---|---|---|---|---|---|---|
| October 30, 2026 | OKTA | Okta, Inc. | KVUE | Kenvue | S&P 500 constituent Kimberly-Clark acquired Kenvue. | |
| October 6, 2026 | TWLO | Twilio | WBD | Warner Bros. Discovery | Paramount Skydance acquired Warner Bros. Discovery | |
| October 6, 2026 | | | CTVA | Corteva | Market capitalization changes. | |
| October 1, 2026 | VYLR | Vylor | | | Corteva completed the corporate spin-off of Vylor | |
| September 21, 2026 | BE | Bloom Energy | TAP | Molson Coors | Market capitalization changes. | |
| September 21, 2026 | P | Everpure | TTD | The Trade Desk | Market capitalization changes. | |
| September 21, 2026 | ILMN | Illumina, Inc. | BLDR | Builders FirstSource | Market capitalization changes. | |
| August 18, 2026 | RDDT | Reddit | AVB | AvalonBay Communities | Equity Residential (now Vivmark Residential) acquired AvalonBay Communities. | |
| August 5, 2026 | FERG | Ferguson Enterprises | EA | Electronic Arts | An investor consortium comprising Saudi Arabia's Public Investment Fund (PIF), Silver Lake, and Affinity Partners acquired Electronic Arts. | |
| June 30, 2026 | | | CAG | Conagra Brands | Market capitalization changes. | |
| June 29, 2026 | HONA | Honeywell Aerospace | | | Honeywell completed the corporate spin-off of Honeywell Aerospace. | |
| June 22, 2026 | MRVL | Marvell Technology | POOL | Pool Corporation | Market capitalization changes. | |
| June 22, 2026 | FLEX | Flex Ltd. | CPB | Campbell's | Market capitalization changes. | |
| June 2, 2026 | | | EPAM | EPAM Systems | Market capitalization changes. | |
| June 1, 2026 | FDXF | FedEx Freight | | | FedEx Corp. completed the corporate spin-off of FedEx Freight Holding. | |
| May 7, 2026 | VEEV | Veeva Systems | CTRA | Coterra Energy | Devon Energy acquired Coterra Energy. | |
| April 9, 2026 | CASY | Casey's | HOLX | Hologic | Blackstone Inc. and TPG Inc. acquired Hologic. | |
| March 23, 2026 | VRT | Vertiv | MTCH | Match Group | Market capitalization changes. | |
| March 23, 2026 | LITE | Lumentum | MOH | Molina Healthcare | Market capitalization changes. | |
| March 23, 2026 | COHR | Coherent Corp. | LW | Lamb Weston | Market capitalization changes. | |
| March 23, 2026 | SATS | EchoStar | PAYC | Paycom | Market capitalization changes. | |
| February 9, 2026 | CIEN | Ciena | DAY | Dayforce | Thoma Bravo L.P. acquired Dayforce. | |
| December 22, 2025 | CRH | CRH | LKQ | LKQ Corporation | Market capitalization changes. | |
| December 22, 2025 | CVNA | Carvana | SOLS | Solstice Advanced Materials | Market capitalization changes. | |
| December 22, 2025 | FIX | Comfort Systems USA | MHK | Mohawk Industries | Market capitalization changes. | |
| December 11, 2025 | ARES | Ares Management | K | Kellanova | Mars Inc. acquired Kellanova. | |
| November 28, 2025 | SNDK | Sandisk | IPG | Interpublic Group | Omnicom Group acquired (The) Interpublic Group. | |
| November 4, 2025 | | | EMN | Eastman Chemical Co. | Market capitalization changes. | |
| November 3, 2025 | Q | Qnity Electronics | | | Dupont completed the corporate spin-off of Qnity Electronics. | |
| October 31, 2025 | | | KMX | CarMax | Market capitalization changes. | |
| October 30, 2025 | SOLS | Solstice Advanced Materials | | | Honeywell International completed the corporate spin-off of Solstice Advanced Materials. | |
| September 22, 2025 | EME | Emcor | ENPH | Enphase Energy | Market capitalization changes. | |
| September 22, 2025 | HOOD | Robinhood Markets | CZR | Caesars Entertainment | Market capitalization changes. | |
| September 22, 2025 | APP | AppLovin | MKTX | MarketAxess | Market capitalization changes. | |
| August 28, 2025 | IBKR | Interactive Brokers | WBA | Walgreens Boots Alliance | Sycamore Partners acquired Walgreen Boots Alliance. | |
| July 23, 2025 | XYZ | Block, Inc. | HES | Hess Corporation | Chevron acquired Hess. | |
| July 18, 2025 | TTD | The Trade Desk | ANSS | Ansys | Synopsys acquired Ansys. | |
| July 9, 2025 | DDOG | Datadog | JNPR | Juniper Networks | Hewlett Packard Enterprise acquired Juniper Networks. | |
| May 19, 2025 | COIN | Coinbase | DFS | Discover Financial | Capital One acquired Discover Financial. | |
| March 24, 2025 | DASH | DoorDash | BWA | BorgWarner | Market capitalization changes. | |
| March 24, 2025 | TKO | TKO Group Holdings | TFX | Teleflex | Market capitalization changes. | |
| March 24, 2025 | WSM | Williams-Sonoma, Inc. | CE | Celanese | Market capitalization changes. | |
| March 24, 2025 | EXE | Expand Energy | FMC | FMC Corporation | Market capitalization changes. | |
| December 23, 2024 | APO | Apollo Global Management | QRVO | Qorvo | Market capitalization changes. | |
| December 23, 2024 | WDAY | Workday, Inc. | AMTM | Amentum | Market capitalization changes. | |
| December 23, 2024 | LII | Lennox International | CTLT | Catalent | Novo Holdings A/S acquired Catalent. | |
| November 26, 2024 | TPL | Texas Pacific Land Corporation | MRO | Marathon Oil | ConocoPhillips acquired Marathon Oil. | |
| October 1, 2024 | | | BBWI | Bath & Body Works, Inc. | Market capitalization changes. | |
| September 30, 2024 | AMTM | Amentum | | | Jacobs Solutions completed the corporate spin-off of its Critical Mission Solutions and Cyber Intelligence business, which merged with private Amentum to create newly publicly traded Amentum Holdings. | |
| September 23, 2024 | PLTR | Palantir Technologies | AAL | American Airlines Group | Market capitalization changes. | |
| September 23, 2024 | DELL | Dell Technologies | ETSY | Etsy | Market capitalization changes. | |
| September 23, 2024 | ERIE | Erie Indemnity | BIO | Bio-Rad Laboratories | Market capitalization changes. | |
| June 24, 2024 | KKR | KKR | RHI | Robert Half | Market capitalization changes. | |
| June 24, 2024 | CRWD | CrowdStrike | CMA | Comerica | Market capitalization changes. | |
| June 24, 2024 | GDDY | GoDaddy | ILMN | Illumina, Inc. | Market capitalization changes. | |
| May 8, 2024 | VST | Vistra | PXD | Pioneer Natural Resources | ExxonMobil acquired Pioneer Natural Resources. | |
| April 3, 2024 | | | XRAY | Dentsply Sirona | Market capitalization changes. | |
| April 3, 2024 | | | VFC | VF Corporation | Market capitalization changes. | |
| April 2, 2024 | GEV | GE Vernova | | | General Electric completed the corporate spin-off of GE Vernova. | |
| April 1, 2024 | SOLV | Solventum | | | 3M completed the corporate spin-off of Solventum. | |
| March 18, 2024 | SMCI | Supermicro | WHR | Whirlpool Corporation | Market capitalization changes. | |
| March 18, 2024 | DECK | Deckers Brands | ZION | Zions Bancorporation | Market capitalization changes. | |
| December 18, 2023 | UBER | Uber | SEE | Sealed Air | Market capitalization changes. | |
| December 18, 2023 | JBL | Jabil | ALK | Alaska Air Group | Market capitalization changes. | |
| December 18, 2023 | BLDR | Builders FirstSource | SEDG | SolarEdge | Market capitalization changes. | |
| October 18, 2023 | HUBB | Hubbell | OGN | Organon & Co. | Market capitalization changes. | |
| October 18, 2023 | LULU | Lululemon Athletica | ATVI | Activision Blizzard | Acquisition of Activision Blizzard by Microsoft. | |
| October 3, 2023 | | | DXC | DXC Technology | Market capitalization changes. | |
| October 2, 2023 | VLTO | Veralto | | | Danaher Corporation completed the corporate spin-off of Veralto. | |
| September 18, 2023 | BX | Blackstone | LNC | Lincoln National Corporation | Market capitalization changes. | |
| September 18, 2023 | ABNB | Airbnb | NWL | Newell Brands | Market capitalization changes. | |
| August 25, 2023 | KVUE | Kenvue | AAP | Advance Auto Parts | Johnson & Johnson offered to exchange the shares of Kenvue held for shares of Johnson & Johnson in a split-off exchange offer. | |
| June 20, 2023 | PANW | Palo Alto Networks | DISH | Dish Network | Market capitalization changes. | |
| May 4, 2023 | AXON | Axon Enterprise | FRC | First Republic Bank | The Federal Deposit Insurance Corporation (FDIC) placed First Republic Bank into receivership. | |
| March 20, 2023 | FICO | Fair Isaac | LUMN | Lumen Technologies | Market capitalization changes. | |
| March 15, 2023 | BG | Bunge Global | SBNY | Signature Bank | The FDIC placed Signature Bank into FDIC Receivership. | |
| March 15, 2023 | PODD | Insulet | SIVB | SVB Financial Group | The FDIC placed SVB's main subsidiary, Silicon Valley Bank, into receivership. | |
| January 5, 2023 | | | VNO | Vornado Realty Trust | Market capitalization changes. | |
| January 4, 2023 | GEHC | GE HealthCare | | | General Electric completed the corporate spin-off of GE HealthCare. | |
| December 22, 2022 | STLD | Steel Dynamics | ABMD | Abiomed | Johnson & Johnson acquired Abiomed. | |
| December 19, 2022 | FSLR | First Solar | FBHS | Fortune Brands Home & Security | Market capitalization changes. | |
| December 19, 2022 | | | MBC | MasterBrand | Market capitalization changes. | |
| December 15, 2022 | MBC | MasterBrand | | | Fortune Brands Home & Security completed the corporate spin-off of MasterBrand. | |
| November 1, 2022 | ACGL | Arch Capital Group | TWTR | Twitter | Elon Musk acquired Twitter. | |
| October 12, 2022 | TRGP | Targa Resources | NLSN | Nielsen Holdings | Elliott Investment Management acquired Nielsen Holdings. | |
| October 3, 2022 | PCG | PG&E | CTXS | Citrix Systems | Vista Equity Partners acquired Citrix Systems. | |
| October 3, 2022 | EQT | EQT Corporation | DRE | Duke Realty | Prologis acquired Duke Realty. | |
| September 19, 2022 | CSGP | CoStar Group | PVH | PVH | Market capitalization changes. | |
| September 19, 2022 | INVH | Invitation Homes | PENN | Penn Entertainment | Market capitalization changes. | |
| June 21, 2022 | | | UA | Under Armour (Class C) | Market capitalization changes. | |
| June 21, 2022 | KDP | Keurig Dr Pepper | UAA | Under Armour (Class A) | Market capitalization changes. | |
| June 21, 2022 | ON | ON Semiconductor | IPGP | IPG Photonics | Market capitalization changes. | |
| June 8, 2022 | VICI | Vici Properties | CERN | Cerner | Oracle acquired Cerner. | |
| April 11, 2022 | WBD | Warner Bros. Discovery | DISCA | Discovery, Inc. | WarnerMedia and Discovery merged to create Warner Bros. Discovery. | |
| April 11, 2022 | | | DISCK | Discovery, Inc. | WarnerMedia and Discovery merged to create Warner Bros. Discovery. | |
| April 4, 2022 | CPT | Camden Property Trust | PBCT | People's United Financial | M&T Bank acquired People's United Financial. | |
| March 2, 2022 | MOH | Molina Healthcare | INFO | IHS Markit | S&P Global acquired IHS Markit. | |
| February 15, 2022 | NDSN | Nordson Corporation | XLNX | Xilinx | Advanced Micro Devices acquired Xilinx. | |
| February 3, 2022 | | | GPS | Gap | Market capitalization changes. | |
| February 2, 2022 | CEG | Constellation Energy | | | Exelon completed the corporate spin-off of Constellation Energy. | |
| December 20, 2021 | SBNY | Signature Bank | LEG | Leggett & Platt | Market capitalization changes. | |
| January 10, 2022 | WTW | Willis Towers Watson | WLTW | Willis Towers Watson | Willis Towers Watson changed its ticker symbol from WLTW to WTW. | |
| December 20, 2021 | SEDG | SolarEdge | HBI | Hanesbrands | Market capitalization changes. | |
| December 20, 2021 | FDS | FactSet | WU | Western Union | Market capitalization changes. | |
| December 14, 2021 | EPAM | EPAM Systems | KSU | Kansas City Southern | Canadian Pacific acquired Kansas City Southern. | |
| September 20, 2021 | MTCH | Match Group | PRGO | Perrigo | Market capitalization changes. | |
| September 20, 2021 | CDAY | Ceridian | UNM | Unum | Market capitalization changes. | |
| September 20, 2021 | BRO | Brown & Brown | NOV | Nov | Market capitalization changes. | |
| August 30, 2021 | TECH | Bio-Techne | MXIM | Maxim Integrated | Analog Devices acquired Maxim Integrated Products. | |
| July 21, 2021 | MRNA | Moderna | ALXN | Alexion Pharmaceuticals | AstraZeneca acquired Alexion Pharmaceuticals. | |
| June 4, 2021 | | | HFC | HollyFrontier | Market capitalization changes. | |
| June 3, 2021 | OGN | Organon & Co. | | | Merck completed the corporate spin-off of Organon. | |
| May 14, 2021 | CRL | Charles River Laboratories | FLIR | FLIR Systems | Teledyne Technologies acquired FLIR Systems. | |
| April 20, 2021 | PTC | PTC | VAR | Varian Medical Systems | Siemens Healthineers acquired Varian Medical Systems. | |
| March 22, 2021 | NXPI | NXP | FLS | Flowserve | Market capitalization changes. | |
| March 22, 2021 | PENN | Penn National Gaming | SLG | SL Green Realty | Market capitalization changes. | |
| March 22, 2021 | GNRC | Generac Holdings | XRX | Xerox | Market capitalization changes. | |
| March 22, 2021 | CZR | Caesars Entertainment | VNT | Vontier | Market capitalization changes. | |
| February 12, 2021 | MPWR | Monolithic Power Systems | FTI | TechnipFMC | Corporate spin-off of Technip Energies. | |
| January 21, 2021 | TRMB | Trimble | CXO | Concho Resources | ConocoPhillips acquired Concho Resources. | |
| January 7, 2021 | ENPH | Enphase Energy | TIF | Tiffany & Co | LVMH Moet Hennessy-Louis Vuitton SE acquired Tiffany & Co. | |
| December 21, 2020 | TSLA | Tesla | AIV | Aimco | Aimco completed the corporate spin-off of Apartment Income REIT. | |
| October 12, 2020 | | | NBL | Noble Energy | Chevron acquired Noble Energy. | |
| October 9, 2020 | VNT | Vontier | | | Fortive completed the corporate spin-off of Vontier. | |
| October 7, 2020 | POOL | Pool Corporation | ETFC | E-Trade | Morgan Stanley acquired E*Trade. | |
| September 21, 2020 | ETSY | Etsy | HRB | H&R Block | Market capitalization changes. | |
| September 21, 2020 | TER | Teradyne | COTY | Coty | Market capitalization changes. | |
| September 21, 2020 | CTLT | Catalent | KSS | Kohl's | Market capitalization changes. | |
| June 22, 2020 | BIO | Bio-Rad Laboratories | ADS | Alliance Data Systems | Market capitalization changes. | |
| June 22, 2020 | TDY | Teledyne | HOG | Harley-Davidson | Market capitalization changes. | |
| June 22, 2020 | TYL | Tyler Technologies | JWN | Nordstrom | Market capitalization changes. | |
| May 22, 2020 | WST | West Pharmaceutical Services | HP | Helmerich & Payne | Market capitalization changes. | |
| May 12, 2020 | DPZ | Domino's Pizza | CPRI | Capri Holdings | Market capitalization changes. | |
| May 12, 2020 | DXCM | Dexcom | AGN | Allergan | Allergan was acquired by AbbVie. | |
| April 6, 2020 | | | M | Macy's | Market capitalization changes. | |
| April 6, 2020 | | | RTN | Raytheon Company | United Technologies corporate spin-off of Otis and Carrier and acquired Raytheon Company. | |
| April 3, 2020 | OTIS | Otis Worldwide | | | United Technologies corporate spin-off of Otis and Carrier and acquired Raytheon Company. | |
| April 3, 2020 | CARR | Carrier | | | United Technologies completed the corporate spin-off of Otis and Carrier and acquired Raytheon Company. | |
| April 1, 2020 | HWM | Howmet Aerospace | ARNC | Arconic | Arconic separated into 2 companies - Howmet remained in the index. | |
| March 3, 2020 | IR | Ingersoll Rand | XEC | Cimarex Energy | Gardner Denver acquired Ingersoll Rand's industrial businesses then changed its name to the "new" Ingersoll Rand Inc. | |
| January 28, 2020 | PAYC | Paycom | WCG | WellCare | Centene acquired Wellcare. | |
| December 23, 2019 | LYV | Live Nation Entertainment | AMG | Affiliated Managers Group | Market capitalization changes. | |
| December 23, 2019 | ZBRA | Zebra Technologies | TRIP | TripAdvisor | Market capitalization changes. | |
| December 23, 2019 | STE | Steris | MAC | Macerich | Market capitalization changes. | |
| December 9, 2019 | ODFL | Old Dominion Freight Line | STI | SunTrust Banks | BB&T acquired SunTrust to form Truist Financial. | |
| December 5, 2019 | WRB | W. R. Berkley Corporation | VIAB | Viacom | CBS acquired Viacom to form ViacomCBS. | |
| November 21, 2019 | NOW | ServiceNow | CELG | Celgene | Bristol-Myers Squibb acquired Celgene. | |
| October 3, 2019 | LVS | Las Vegas Sands | NKTR | Nektar Therapeutics | Market capitalization changes. | |
| September 26, 2019 | NVR | NVR | JEF | Jefferies Financial Group | SPB completed the corporate spin-off of Jefferies Financial Group. | |
| September 23, 2019 | CDW | CDW | TSS | TSYS | Global Payments acquired TSS. | |
| August 9, 2019 | LDOS | Leidos | APC | Anadarko Petroleum | Occidental Petroleum acquired Anadarko Petroleum. | |
| August 9, 2019 | IEX | IDEX Corporation | FL | Foot Locker | Market capitalization changes. | |
| July 15, 2019 | TMUS | T-Mobile US | RHT | Red Hat | IBM acquired Red Hat. | |
| July 1, 2019 | MKTX | MarketAxess | LLL | L3 Technologies | L3 was acquired by Harris Corporation. | |
| June 11, 2019 | AMCR | Amcor | BMS | Bemis | BMS changed to AMCR post merger with Amcor; subsequently renamed to Amcor. | |
| June 7, 2019 | BMS | Bemis | MAT | Mattel | Merger of Bemis and Amcor; Bemis was the surviving entity. | |
| June 3, 2019 | DD | DuPont | DWDP | DuPont | DWDP changed to DD after spinning off Corteva. | |
| June 3, 2019 | CTVA | Corteva | FLR | Fluor Corporation | DowDuPont completed the corporate spin-off of Corteva. | |
| April 2, 2019 | DOW | Dow | BHF | Brighthouse Financial | DowDuPont completed the corporate spin-off of Dow Inc. | |
| March 20, 2019 | | | TFCFA | 21st Century Fox | 21st Century Fox's Class A shares changed ticker from FOXA to TFCFA effective March 19; the company was removed from the index on March 20. | |
| March 20, 2019 | | | TFCF | 21st Century Fox | 21st Century Fox's Class B shares changed ticker from FOX to TFCF effective March 19; the company was removed from the index on March 20. | |
| March 19, 2019 | FOXA | Fox Corporation | | | Fox Corporation was added following its spin-off from 21st Century Fox. | |
| March 19, 2019 | FOX | Fox Corporation | | | Fox Corporation was added following its spin-off from 21st Century Fox. | |
| February 27, 2019 | WAB | Wabtec | GT | The Goodyear Tire & Rubber Company | Wabtec acquired GE transportation business | |
| February 15, 2019 | ATO | Atmos Energy | NFX | Newfield Exploration | Encana acquired Newfield Exploration. | |
| January 18, 2019 | TFX | Teleflex | PCG | Pacific Gas & Electric Company | Pacific Gas & Electric Company filed for bankruptcy. | |
| January 2, 2019 | FRC | First Republic Bank | SCG | SCANA | Dominion Energy acquired SCANA. | |
| December 24, 2018 | CE | Celanese | ESRX | Express Scripts | Cigna acquired Express Scripts. | |
| December 3, 2018 | LW | Lamb Weston | COL | Rockwell Collins | UTX acquired Rockwell Collins. | |
| December 3, 2018 | MXIM | Maxim Integrated | AET | Aetna | CVS acquired Aetna. | |
| December 3, 2018 | FANG | Diamondback Energy | SRCL | Stericycle | Market capitalization changes. | |
| November 13, 2018 | JKHY | Jack Henry & Associates | EQT | EQT Corporation | EQT completed the corporate spin-off of ETRN. | |
| November 6, 2018 | KEYS | Keysight | CA | CA Technologies | CA was acquired by Broadcom. | |
| October 11, 2018 | FTNT | Fortinet | EVHC | Envision Healthcare | EVHC was acquired by KKR. | |
| October 1, 2018 | ROL | Rollins | ANDV | Andeavor | ANDV was acquired by Marathon Petroleum. | |
| September 14, 2018 | WCG | WellCare | XL | XL Group | XL was acquired by Axa. | |
| August 28, 2018 | ANET | Arista Networks | GGP | GGP Inc. | GGP was acquired by Brookfield Property Partners. | |
| July 2, 2018 | CPRT | Copart | DPS | Dr Pepper Snapple Group | DPS was acquired by Keurig Green Mountain. | |
| June 20, 2018 | FLT | FleetCor Technologies | TWX | Time Warner | AT&T acquired Time Warner. | |
| June 18, 2018 | BR | Broadridge Financial Solutions | RRC | Range Resources | Market capitalization changes. | |
| June 18, 2018 | HFC | HollyFrontier | AYI | Acuity Brands | Market capitalization changes. | |
| June 7, 2018 | TWTR | Twitter | MON | Monsanto | Bayer acquired Monsanto. | |
| June 5, 2018 | EVRG | Evergy | NAVI | Navient | Westar Energy acquired Great Plains Energy and changed name to Evergy. | |
| May 31, 2018 | ABMD | Abiomed | WYN | Wyndham Worldwide | Wyndham Worldwide completed the corporate spin-off of Wyndham Hotels & Resorts. | |
| April 4, 2018 | MSCI | MSCI | CSRA | CSRA | General Dynamics acquired CSRA. | |
| March 19, 2018 | TTWO | Take-Two Interactive | SIG | Signet Jewelers | Market capitalization changes. | |
| March 19, 2018 | SIVB | SVB Financial Group | PDCO | Patterson Companies | Market capitalization changes. | |
| March 19, 2018 | NKTR | Nektar Therapeutics | CHK | Chesapeake Energy | Market capitalization changes. | |
| March 7, 2018 | IPGP | IPG Photonics | SNI | Scripps Networks Interactive | Discovery Communications acquired Scripps Networks Interactive. | |
| January 3, 2018 | HII | Huntington Ingalls Industries | BCR | CR Bard | Becton Dickinson acquired CR Bard. | |
| November 15, 2017 | IQV | IQVIA | Q | QuintilesIMS | QuintilesIMS changed its name to IQVIA and ticker symbol from Q to IQV. | |
| October 13, 2017 | NCLH | Norwegian Cruise Line Holdings | LVLT | Level 3 Communications | CenturyLink acquired Level 3 Communications. | |
| September 18, 2017 | CDNS | Cadence Design Systems | SPLS | Staples | Sycamore Partners acquired Staples. | |
| September 1, 2017 | DWDP | DuPont | DOW | Dow Chemical Company | The Dow Chemical Company renamed to DowDuPont Inc. | |
| September 1, 2017 | SBAC | SBA Communications | DD | DuPont | The Dow Chemical Company acquired DuPont. | |
| August 29, 2017 | Q | QuintilesIMS | WFM | Whole Foods Market | Amazon acquired Whole Foods Market. | |
| August 8, 2017 | BHF | Brighthouse Financial | AN | AutoNation | MetLife completed the corporate spin-off of Brighthouse Financial. | |
| July 26, 2017 | DRE | Duke Realty | RIG | Transocean | Market capitalization changes. | |
| July 26, 2017 | AOS | A. O. Smith | BBBY | Bed Bath & Beyond | Market capitalization changes. | |
| July 26, 2017 | PKG | Packaging Corporation of America | MUR | Murphy Oil | Market capitalization changes. | |
| July 26, 2017 | RMD | ResMed | MNK | Mallinckrodt | Market capitalization changes. | |
| July 26, 2017 | MGM | MGM Resorts International | RAI | Reynolds American | British American Tobacco (NYSE MKT:BTI) acquired Reynolds American. | |
| July 7, 2017 | BKR | Baker Hughes | BHI | Baker Hughes | Baker Hughes merged with GE Oil & Gas to form a new company. | |
| June 19, 2017 | HLT | Hilton | YHOO | Yahoo! | Verizon acquired Yahoo operations; remainder of Yahoo became Altaba. | |
| June 19, 2017 | ALGN | Align Technology | TDC | Teradata | Market capitalization changes. | |
| June 19, 2017 | ANSS | Ansys | R | Ryder System | Market capitalization changes. | |
| June 19, 2017 | RE | Everest Re | MJN | Mead Johnson | Reckitt Benckiser acquired Mead Johnson Nutrition. | |
| June 2, 2017 | INFO | IHS Markit | TGNA | Tegna | TGNA completed the corporate spin-off of Cars.com. | |
| April 5, 2017 | IT | Gartner | DNB | Dun & Bradstreet | Gartner acquired CEB. | |
| April 4, 2017 | DXC | DXC Technology | SWN | Southwestern Energy | HPE completed the corporate spin-off of Everett, merged with CSC to form DXC Technology. | |
| March 20, 2017 | AMD | Advanced Micro Devices | URBN | Urban Outfitters | Market capitalization changes. | |
| March 20, 2017 | RJF | Raymond James Financial | FTR | Frontier Communications | Market capitalization changes. | |
| March 20, 2017 | ARE | Alexandria Real Estate Equities | FSLR | First Solar | Market capitalization changes. | |
| March 16, 2017 | SNPS | Synopsys | HAR | Harman International | Samsung Electronics acquired Harman International Industries. | |
| March 13, 2017 | DISH | Dish Network | LLTC | Linear Technology | Analog Devices acquired Linear Technology. | |
| March 2, 2017 | REG | Regency Centers | ENDP | Endo International | Regency Centers acquired EQY. | |
| March 1, 2017 | CBOE | Cboe Holdings | PBI | Pitney Bowes | CBOE acquired BATS. | |
| February 28, 2017 | INCY | Incyte | SE | Spectra Energy | SE was acquired by ENB | |
| January 5, 2017 | IDXX | Idexx Laboratories | STJ | St Jude Medical | Abbott Laboratories acquired St. Jude Medical. | |
| December 2, 2016 | MAA | Mid-America Apartments | OI | Owens-Illinois | Market capitalization changes. | |
| December 2, 2016 | EVHC | Envision Healthcare | LM | Legg Mason | Market capitalization changes. | |
| November 1, 2016 | ARNC | Arconic | AA | Alcoa | Alcoa completed the corporate spin-off off Arconic. | |
| September 30, 2016 | COTY | Coty | DO | Diamond Offshore Drilling | Siris Capital Group acquired Polycom. | |
| September 22, 2016 | COO | The Cooper Companies | HOT | Starwood Hotels and Resorts | MAR acquired Starwood Hotels | |
| September 8, 2016 | CHTR | Charter Communications | EMC | EMC Corporation | Dell acquired EMC. | |
| September 6, 2016 | MTD | Mettler Toledo | TYC | Tyco International | TYC acquired JCI and retained JCI ticker. | |
| July 5, 2016 | FTV | Fortive Corp | CPGX | Columbia Pipeline Group | CPGX was acquired by TRP. | |
| July 1, 2016 | LNT | Alliant Energy Corp | GAS | AGL Resources | AGL Resources was acquired by Southern Company. | |
| July 1, 2016 | ALB | Albemarle Corporation | TE | TECO Energy | TECO Energy was acquired by EMA. | |
| June 22, 2016 | FBHS | Fortune Brands Home & Security | CVC | Cablevision Systems | Cablevision Systems was acquired by Altice. | |
| June 3, 2016 | TDG | TransDigm Group | BXLT | Baxalta | SHPG acquired Baxalta. | |
| May 31, 2016 | AJG | Arthur J. Gallagher & Co. | CCE | Coca-Cola Enterprises | Coca-Cola Enterprises merged with European bottlers. | |
| May 23, 2016 | LKQ | LKQ Corporation | ARG | Airgas | Airgas was acquired by Air Liquide. | |
| May 18, 2016 | DLR | Digital Realty | TWC | Time Warner Cable | Time Warner Cable was acquired by Charter. | |
| May 13, 2016 | ALK | Alaska Air Group | SNDK | SanDisk | Sandisk was acquired by Western Digital. | |
| May 3, 2016 | AYI | Acuity Brands | ADT | ADT | ADT was acquired by Apollo. | |
| April 25, 2016 | GPN | Global Payments | GME | GameStop | Global Payments acquired Heartland Payment Systems. | |
| April 18, 2016 | ULTA | Ulta Beauty | THC | Tenet Healthcare | | |
| April 8, 2016 | UA.C | Under Armour (Class C) | | | Under Armour distribution of second class of stock. | |
| April 4, 2016 | FL | Foot Locker | CAM | Cameron International | Schlumberger acquired Cameron. | |
| March 30, 2016 | HOLX | Hologic | POM | Pepco Holdings | Exelon acquired Pepco. | |
| March 30, 2016 | CNC | Centene Corporation | ESV | Ensco | Centene acquired Health Net. | |
| March 7, 2016 | UDR | UDR | GMCR | Keurig Green Mountain | JAB Holding Company acquired Keurig Green Mountain. | |
| March 4, 2016 | AWK | American Water Works | CNX | Consol Energy | | |
| February 22, 2016 | CXO | Concho Resources | PCL | Plum Creek Timber | Weyerhaeuser acquired Plum Creek Timber. | |
| February 1, 2016 | CFG | Citizens | PCP | Precision Castparts Corporation | | |
| February 1, 2016 | FRT | Federal Realty Investment Trust | BRCM | Broadcom Corporation | | |
| January 19, 2016 | EXR | Extra Space Storage | ACE | Chubb | ACE Ltd acquired Chubb and retained the CB ticker. | |
| January 5, 2016 | WLTW | Willis Towers Watson | FOSL | Fossil Group | Willis Holdings merged with Towers Watson and was renamed Willis Towers Watson. | |
| December 29, 2015 | CHD | Church & Dwight | ALTR | Altera | Altera was acquired by Intel. | |
| December 15, 2015 | | | CMCSK | Comcast Series K | CMCSK shares were no longer listed. | |
| December 1, 2015 | CSRA | CSRA | CSC | Computer Sciences Corporation | CSC completed the corporate spin-off off CSRA. | |
| November 19, 2015 | ILMN | Illumina | SIAL | Sigma-Aldrich | Sigma-Aldrich was acquired by Merck KGaA. | |
| November 18, 2015 | SYF | Synchrony Financial | GNW | Genworth Financial | GE completed the corporate spin-off of Synchrony Financial. | |
| November 2, 2015 | HPE | Hewlett Packard Enterprise | HCBK | Hudson City Bancorp | HPQ completed the corporate spin-off of Hewlett Packard Enterprise. | |
| October 7, 2015 | VRSK | Verisk Analytics | JOY | Joy Global | Market capitalization changes. | |
| September 18, 2015 | CMCSK | Comcast Class K Special | | | Share class methodology change. | |
| September 18, 2015 | FOX | Twenty-First Century Fox Class B | | | Share class methodology change. | |
| September 18, 2015 | NWS | News Corporation Class B | | | Share class methodology change. | |
| September 2, 2015 | UAL | United Continental Holdings | HSP | Hospira | Hospira was acquired. | |
| August 28, 2015 | ATVI | Activision Blizzard | PLL | Pall Corporation | Pall was acquired. | |
| July 29, 2015 | SIG | Signet Jewelers | DTV | DirecTV | DirecTV was acquired by AT&T. | |
| July 20, 2015 | PYPL | PayPal | NE | Noble Corporation | eBay completed the corporate spin-off of PayPal. | |
| July 8, 2015 | AAP | Advance Auto Parts | FDO | Family Dollar | Family Dollar was acquired. | |
| July 6, 2015 | KHC | Kraft Heinz | KRFT | Kraft Foods | Kraft merged with Heinz. | |
| July 2, 2015 | CPGX | Columbia Pipeline Group | ATI | Allegheny Technologies | Spin off of Columbia Pipeline. | |
| July 1, 2015 | JBHT | J.B. Hunt | TEG | Integrys Energy Group | Integrys was acquired. | |
| July 1, 2015 | BXLT | Baxalta | QEP | QEP Resources | Baxter completed the corporate spin-off of Baxalta. | |
| June 11, 2015 | QRVO | Qorvo | LO | Lorillard Tobacco Company | Lorillard was acquired. | |
| April 7, 2015 | O | Realty Income Corporation | WIN | Windstream Communications | Market capitalization changes. | |
| March 23, 2015 | AAL | American Airlines Group | AGN | Allergan | Allergan was acquired by Actavis (and changed its name to Allergan). | |
| March 23, 2015 | EQIX | Equinix | DNR | Denbury Resources | Market capitalization changes. | |
| March 23, 2015 | SLG | SL Green Realty | NBR | Nabors Industries | Market capitalization changes. | |
| March 23, 2015 | HBI | Hanesbrands | AVP | Avon Products | Market capitalization changes. | |
| March 18, 2015 | HSIC | Henry Schein | CFN | Carefusion | Carefusion was acquired by Becton Dickinson. | |
| March 12, 2015 | SWKS | Skyworks | PETM | PetSmart | PetSmart was acquired by private equity consortium. | |
| January 27, 2015 | HCA | HCA Holdings | SWY | Safeway | Safeway was acquired by a private equity consortium. | |
| January 27, 2015 | ENDP | Endo International | COV | Covidien | Covidien was acquired by Medtronic. | |
| December 5, 2014 | RCL | Royal Caribbean Cruises | BMS | Bemis Company | Market capitalization changes. | |
| November 5, 2014 | LVLT | Level 3 Communications | JBL | Jabil Circuit | Market capitalization changes. | |
| September 20, 2014 | URI | United Rentals | BTU | Peabody Energy | Market capitalization changes. | |
| September 20, 2014 | UHS | Universal Health Services | GHC | Graham Holdings | Market capitalization changes. | |
| August 18, 2014 | MNK | Mallinckrodt | RDC | Rowan Companies | Market capitalization changes. | |
| August 6, 2014 | DISCK | Discovery Communications | | | Class C share distribution. | |
| July 2, 2014 | MLM | Martin Marietta | X | United States Steel | Market capitalization changes. | |
| July 1, 2014 | AMG | Affiliated Managers Group | FRX | Forest Laboratories | Actavis acquired Forest Laboratories. | |
| June 20, 2014 | XEC | Cimarex Energy | IGT | International Game Technology | Market capitalization changes. | |
| May 8, 2014 | AVGO | Avago Technologies | LSI | LSI Corporation | Avago acquired LSI. | |
| May 1, 2014 | UA | Under Armour | BEAM | Suntory Global Spirits | Beam was acquired by Suntory. | |
| May 1, 2014 | NAVI | Navient | SLM | SLM Corporation | SLM completed the corporate spin-off of Navient. | |
| April 3, 2014 | GOOGL | Google | | | Google Class C share distribution. | |
| April 2, 2014 | ESS | Essex Property Trust | CLF | Cliffs Natural Resources | Market capitalization changes. | |
| March 21, 2014 | GMCR | Keurig Green Mountain | WPX | WPX Energy | Market capitalization changes. | |
| January 24, 2014 | TSCO | Tractor Supply | LIFE | Life Technologies | Life Technologies was acquired by Thermo Fisher Scientific. | |
| December 23, 2013 | ADS | Alliance Data Systems | ANF | Abercrombie & Fitch | Market capitalization changes. | |
| December 23, 2013 | MHK | Mohawk Industries | JDSU | JDS Uniphase | Market capitalization changes. | |
| December 23, 2013 | FB | Facebook | TER | Teradyne | Market capitalization changes. | |
| December 10, 2013 | GGP | General Growth Properties | MOLX | Molex | MOLX was acquired by Koch Industries. | |
| December 2, 2013 | ALLE | | Allegion | JCP | | JCPenney | Ingersoll Rand completed the corporate spin-off of Allegion. | |
| November 13, 2013 | KORS | Michael Kors | NYX | NYSE Euronext | ICE Exchange acquired NYSE Euronext. | |
| October 29, 2013 | RIG | Transocean | DELL | Dell | Founder Michael Dell and Silver Lake Partners acquired Dell. | |
| September 20, 2013 | VRTX | Vertex Pharmaceuticals | AMD | Advanced Micro Devices | Market capitalization changes. | |
| September 20, 2013 | AME | Ametek | SAI | SAIC | Market capitalization changes. | |
| September 10, 2013 | DAL | Delta Air Lines | BMC | BMC Software | BMC was acquired by a consortium. | |
| July 8, 2013 | NLSN | Nielsen Holdings | S | Sprint Nextel | Softbank consortium purchase resulted in public float below 50%. | |
| July 1, 2013 | NWSA | 21st Century Fox | APOL | Apollo Education Group | Market capitalization changes. | |
| June 21, 2013 | ZTS | Zoetis | FHN | First Horizon | Pfizer completed the corporate spin-off of Zoetis. | |
| June 6, 2013 | GM | General Motors | HNZ | Heinz | HNZ was acquired by a consortium. | |
| May 23, 2013 | KSU | Kansas City Southern | DF | Dean Foods | DF was too small after spinoff of White Wave Foods. | |
| May 8, 2013 | MAC | Macerich | CVH | Coventry Health Care | CVH was acquired by Aetna. | |
| April 30, 2013 | REGN | Regeneron Pharmaceuticals | PCS | MetroPCS | A majority of MetroPCS was acquired by T-Mobile. | |
| February 15, 2013 | PVH | PVH | BIG | Big Lots | Market capitalization changes. | |
| January 2, 2013 | ABBV | AbbVie | FII | Federated Investors | Abbott Labs completed the corporate spin-off of AbbVie. | |
| December 21, 2012 | DLPH | Delphi Automotive | TIE | Titanium Metals | TIE was acquired by Precision Cast Parts. | |
| December 11, 2012 | GRMN | Garmin | RRD | RR Donnelley | Market capitalization changes. | |
| December 3, 2012 | DG | Dollar General | CBE | Cooper Industries | Cooper was acquired by Eaton Corp. (ETN) | |
| October 10, 2012 | PETM | PetSmart | SUN | Sunoco | Sunoco was acquired by Energy Transfer Partners (ETP) | |
| October 2, 2012 | KRFT | Kraft Foods | ANR | Alpha Natural Resources | Kraft split into two companies. | |
| October 2, 2012 | MDLZ | Mondelez | KFT | Kraft Foods | Old Kraft Foods was renamed Mondelez. | |
| October 1, 2012 | ADT | ADT | LXK | Lexmark | Tyco completed the corporate spin-off of ADT. | |
| October 1, 2012 | PNR | Pentair | DV | DeVry | Tyco spin-off merged with Pentair. | |
| September 5, 2012 | LYB | LyondellBasell | SHLD | Sears Holdings | SHLD below public float threshold. | |
| July 31, 2012 | ESV | Ensco plc | GR | Goodrich Corporation | Goodrich was acquired by United Technologies. | |
| July 2, 2012 | STX | Seagate Technology | PGN | Progress Energy | Progress Energy was acquired by Duke Energy. | |
| June 29, 2012 | MNST | Monster Beverage | SLE | Sara Lee Corporation | Split up of Sara Lee. | |
| June 5, 2012 | LRCX | Lam Research | NVLS | Novellus Systems | Novellus Systems was acquired by Lam Research. | |
| May 21, 2012 | ALXN | Alexion Pharmaceuticals | MMI | Motorola Mobility | Motorola Mobility was acquired by Google. | |
| May 17, 2012 | KMI | Kinder Morgan | EP | El Paso Corporation | El Paso was acquired by Kinder Morgan. | |
| April 23, 2012 | PSX | Phillips 66 | SVU | Supervalu | ConocoPhillips completed the corporate spin-off of Phillips 66. | |
| April 3, 2012 | FOSL | Fossil Group | MHS | Medco Health Solutions | Medco was acquired by Express Scripts. | |
| March 13, 2012 | CCI | Crown Castle | CEG | Constellation Energy Group | Constellation was acquired by Exelon | |
| December 31, 2011 | WPX | WPX Energy | CPWR | Compuware | Market capitalization changes. | |
| December 20, 2011 | TRIP | TripAdvisor | TLAB | Tellabs | Expedia completed the corporate spin-off of TripAdvisor. | |
| December 16, 2011 | BWA | BorgWarner | AKS | AK Steel | Market capitalization changes. | |
| December 16, 2011 | PRGO | Perrigo | MWW | Monster Worldwide | Market capitalization changes. | |
| December 16, 2011 | DLTR | Dollar Tree | WFR | MEMC Electronic Materials | Market capitalization changes. | |
| December 12, 2011 | GAS | AGL Resources. | GAS | Nicor Gas | Nicor was acquired by AGL, which retained the GAS ticker. | |
| November 18, 2011 | CBE | Cooper Industries | JNS | Janus Capital Group | Market capitalization changes. | |
| October 31, 2011 | XYL | Xylem | ITT | | ITT | ITT Corp. completed the corporate spin-off of Xylem. | |
| October 14, 2011 | TEL | TE Connectivity | CEPH | Cephalon | Cephalon was acquired by Teva Pharmaceutical Industries. | |
| September 23, 2011 | MOS | The Mosaic Company | NSM | National Semiconductor | National Semi was acquired by Texas Instruments. | |
| July 5, 2011 | ACN | Accenture | MI | Marshall & Ilsley | Marshall & Ilsley was acquired by Bank of Montreal. | |
| June 30, 2011 | MPC | Marathon Oil | RSH | RadioShack | Market capitalization changes. | |
| June 1, 2011 | ANR | Alpha Natural Resources | MEE | Massey Energy | Alpha Natural Resources acquired Massey Energy. | |
| April 27, 2011 | CMG | Chipotle Mexican Grill | NOVL | Novell | Novell was acquired by private equity firms. | |
| April 1, 2011 | BLK | BlackRock | GENZ | Genzyme | Genzyme was acquired by Sanofi Aventis. | |
| March 31, 2011 | EW | Edwards Lifesciences | Q | Qwest Communications | Qwest was acquired by CenturyLink. | |
| February 28, 2011 | COV | Covidien | MFE | McAfee | McAfee was acquired by Intel. | |
| February 25, 2011 | JOYG | Joy Global | AYE | Allegheny Energy | Alleghany was acquired by First Energy. | |
| January 3, 2011 | MMI | Motorola Mobility | MDP | Meredith Corp | Motorola completed the corporate spin-off of Motorola Mobility. | |
| December 17, 2010 | CVC | Cablevision | KG | King Pharmaceuticals | King was acquired by Pfizer. | |
| December 17, 2010 | FFIV | F5 Networks | EK | Eastman Kodak | Market capitalization changes. | |
| December 17, 2010 | NFLX | Netflix | ODP | Office Depot | Market capitalization changes. | |
| December 17, 2010 | NFX | Newfield Exploration | NYT | The New York Times Company | Market capitalization changes. | |
| November 17, 2010 | IR | Ingersoll-Rand | PTV | Pactiv | Reynolds Group Holdings acquired Pactiv. | |
| August 26, 2010 | TYC | Tyco International | SII | Smith International | Smith was acquired by Schlumberger. | |
| July 14, 2010 | CB | Chubb | MIL | Millipore | Millipore was acquired by Merck KGaA. | |
| June 30, 2010 | QEP | QEP Resources | STR | Questar | Company split. QEP retained, but ticker changed. | |
| June 28, 2010 | KMX | CarMax | XTO | XTO Energy | XTO was acquired by ExxonMobil. | |
| April 29, 2010 | CERN | Cerner | BJS | BJ Services | BJ Services was acquired by Baker Hughes. | |
| February 26, 2010 | HP | Helmerich & Payne | RX | IMS Health | IMS was acquired by affiliates of TPG Capital | |
| December 18, 2009 | V | Visa | CIEN | Ciena | Market capitalization changes. | |
| December 18, 2009 | MJN | Mead Johnson Nutrition | DYN | Dynegy | Market capitalization changes. | |
| December 18, 2009 | CLF | Cliffs Natural Resources | KBH | KB Home | Market capitalization changes. | |
| December 18, 2009 | SAI | SAIC | CVG | Convergys | Market capitalization changes. | |
| December 18, 2009 | ROST | Ross Stores | MBI | MBIA | Market capitalization changes. | |
| November 3, 2009 | PCLN | Priceline.com | SGP | Schering-Plough | Schering-Plough was acquired by Merck & Co. | |
| September 28, 2009 | ARG | Airgas | CBE | Cooper Industries | Cooper redomesticated to Ireland. | |
| August 19, 2009 | FMC | FMC Corporation | CTX | Centex Corp. | Centex was acquired by Pulte Homes. | |
| June 29, 2009 | PCS | MetroPCS | | | | |
| June 25, 2009 | | | TEL | TE Connectivity | Tyco Electronics was removed because it was reincorporating in Switzerland, making it ineligible for inclusion. | |
| June 5, 2009 | FTI | FMC Technologies | COV | Covidien | Covidien moved its place of incorporation to Ireland, making it ineligible for inclusion in the index. | |
| March 3, 2009 | HRL | Hormel Foods | ACAS | American Capital | Market capitalization changes. | |
| March 3, 2009 | VTR | Ventas | JNY | Jones Apparel Group | Market capitalization changes. | |
| December 31, 2008 | OI | Owens-Illinois | WB | Wachovia Bank | Wachovia Bank was acquired by Wells Fargo. | |
| September 16, 2008 | HRS | Harris Corporation | LEH | Lehman Brothers | Lehman Brothers filed for bankruptcy. | |
| September 12, 2008 | CRM | Salesforce | FRE | Freddie Mac | Market capitalization changes. | |
| September 12, 2008 | FAST | Fastenal | FNM | Fannie Mae | Market capitalization changes. | |
| July 1, 2008 | AKS | AK Steel | CFC | Countrywide Financial Corp | Market capitalization changes. | |
| June 23, 2008 | COG | Cabot Oil & Gas | BC | Brunswick | Market capitalization changes. | |
| June 23, 2008 | MEE | Massey Energy | OMX | OfficeMax | Market capitalization changes. | |
| June 10, 2008 | LO | Lorillard Tobacco Company | ABK | Ambac Financial | Market capitalization changes. | |
| December 20, 2007 | RRC | Range Resources | TRB | Tribune Media | Tribune was acquired. | |
| December 13, 2007 | GME | GameStop | DJ | Dow Jones | Dow Jones was acquired by News Corporation. | |
| October 26, 2007 | JEC | Jacobs Engineering Group | AV | Avaya | Avaya was acquired. | |
| October 2, 2007 | EXPE | Expedia | SLR | Solectron | Solectron was acquired by Flextronics. | |
| October 1, 2007 | TDC | Teradata | NCR | NCR Corporation | NCR Corporation completed the corporate spin-off of Teradata. | |
| September 27, 2007 | TSO | Tesoro Corporation | MXIM | Maxim Integrated Products | MXIM was delisted from NASDAQ exchange. | |
| September 26, 2007 | ICE | Intercontinental Exchange | FDC | First Data | FDC was acquired by KKR. | |
| August 24, 2007 | LUK | Leucadia National | KSE | KeySpan | KeySpan was acquired by National Grid plc. | |
| July 2, 2007 | DFS | Discover Financial | ADCT | ADC Telecommunications | Discover Financial Services was listed on New York Stock Exchange. | |
| March 30, 2007 | KFT | Kraft Foods | TSG | Sabre Corporation | Sabre was acquired. | |
| January 10, 2007 | AVB | AvalonBay Communities | SBL | Symbol Technologies | Symbol Technologies was acquired by Motorola. | |
| June 2, 2006 | JNPR | Juniper Networks | ABS | Albertsons | Albertsons was acquired by SuperValu and CVS Corp. | |
| November 18, 2005 | AMZN | Amazon | T | AT&T Corporation | AT&T Corp. was acquired by SBC Communications | |
| July 1, 2005 | STZ | Constellation Brands | GLK | Great Lakes Chemical | Great Lakes Chemical was acquired by Crompton Corp. | |
| September 25, 2003 | ESRX | Express Scripts | QTRN | Quintiles Transnational | Acquired. | |
| December 5, 2000 | INTU | Intuit | BS | Bethlehem Steel | Market capitalization changes. | |
| December 5, 2000 | SBL | Symbol Technologies | OI | Owens-Illinois | Market capitalization changes. | |
| December 5, 2000 | AYE | Allegheny Energy | GRA | WR Grace | Market capitalization changes. | |
| December 5, 2000 | ABK | Ambac Financial | CCK | Crown Holdings | Market capitalization changes. | |
| July 27, 2000 | JDSU | JDS Uniphase | RAD | Rite Aid | Market capitalization changes. | |
| June 12, 2000 | CVG | Convergys | TMC | Times Mirror | Tribune Co. acquired Times Mirror. | |
| June 7, 2000 | SBUX | Starbucks | SMS | Shared Medical Systems | Siemens AG acquired Shared Medical Systems. | |
| December 8, 1999 | YHOO | Yahoo! | LDW | Laidlaw | Market capitalization changes. | |
| June 9, 1999 | WLP | Wellpoint | HPH | Harnischfeger Industries | Harnischfeger filed for bankruptcy. | |
| April 12, 1999 | ACT | Actavis | | | Actavis plc was added to the S&P 500. | |
| December 11, 1998 | FSR | Firstar | AN | Amoco | BP purchased Amoco. | |
| December 11, 1998 | CCL | Carnival Corporation | GRN | General Re | Berkshire Hathaway acquired General Re. | |
| December 11, 1998 | CPWR | Compuware | SUN | SunAmerica | AIG acquired SunAmerica. | |
| June 17, 1997 | CCR | Countrywide Credit Industries | USL | USLife | AIG acquired USLife. | |
| September 30, 1994 | NCC | National City | MCK | McKesson | McKesson sold PCS Health Services to Eli Lilly. | |
| July 1, 1976 | BUD | Anheuser Busch | HNG | Houston Natural Gas | S&P 500 reorganized to have fewer industrials and utilities, and more financial companies to add "new strength and breadth". | |
| July 1, 1976 | DIS | The Walt Disney Company | AYE | Allegheny Energy | S&P 500 reorganized to have fewer industrials and utilities, and more financial companies to add "new strength and breadth". | |

== See also ==
- List of S&P 500 companies
