= List of S&P 500 companies =

List of companies in the S&P 500

Locations of headquarters of the components of the S&P 500

The S&P 500 is a stock market index maintained by S&P Dow Jones Indices. It comprises 503 common stocks which are issued by 500 companies with large market capitalizations, including two share classes of stock from three of its component companies: Alphabet, Fox Corporation and News Corp. The index includes about 80% of the American stock market by capitalization. It is weighted by free-float market capitalization. An updated weighting of each component is available online.

== S&P 500 component stocks ==
Symbol	Security	GICS Sector	GICS Sub-Industry	Headquarters Location	Date added	CIK	Founded
MMM	3M	Industrials	Industrial Conglomerates	Saint Paul, Minnesota	1957-03-04	0000066740	1902
AOS	A. O. Smith	Industrials	Building Products	Milwaukee, Wisconsin	2017-07-26	0000091142	1916
ABT	Abbott Laboratories	Health Care	Health Care Equipment	North Chicago, Illinois	1957-03-04	0000001800	1888
ABBV	AbbVie	Health Care	Biotechnology	North Chicago, Illinois	2012-12-31	0001551152	2013 (1888)
ACN	Accenture	Information Technology	IT Consulting & Other Services	Dublin, Ireland	2011-07-06	0001467373	1989
ADBE	Adobe Inc.	Information Technology	Application Software	San Jose, California	1997-05-05	0000796343	1982
AMD	Advanced Micro Devices	Information Technology	Semiconductors	Santa Clara, California	2017-03-20	0000002488	1969
AES	AES Corporation	Utilities	Independent Power Producers & Energy Traders	Arlington, Virginia	1998-10-02	0000874761	1981
AFL	Aflac	Financials	Life & Health Insurance	Columbus, Georgia	1999-05-28	0000004977	1955
A	Agilent Technologies	Health Care	Life Sciences Tools & Services	Santa Clara, California	2000-06-05	0001090872	1999
APD	Air Products	Materials	Industrial Gases	Upper Macungie Township, Pennsylvania	1985-04-30	0000002969	1940
ABNB	Airbnb	Consumer Discretionary	Hotels, Resorts & Cruise Lines	San Francisco, California	2023-09-18	0001559720	2008
AKAM	Akamai Technologies	Information Technology	Internet Services & Infrastructure	Cambridge, Massachusetts	2007-07-12	0001086222	1998
ALB	Albemarle Corporation	Materials	Specialty Chemicals	Charlotte, North Carolina	2016-07-01	0000915913	1994
ARE	Alexandria Real Estate Equities	Real Estate	Office REITs	Pasadena, California	2017-03-20	0001035443	1994
ALGN	Align Technology	Health Care	Health Care Supplies	Tempe, Arizona	2017-06-19	0001097149	1997
ALLE	Allegion	Industrials	Building Products	Dublin, Ireland	2013-12-02	0001579241	1908
LNT	Alliant Energy	Utilities	Electric Utilities	Madison, Wisconsin	2016-07-01	0000352541	1917
ALL	Allstate	Financials	Property & Casualty Insurance	Northbrook, Illinois	1995-07-13	0000899051	1931
GOOGL	Alphabet Inc. (Class A)	Communication Services	Interactive Media & Services	Mountain View, California	2006-04-03	0001652044	1998
GOOG	Alphabet Inc. (Class C)	Communication Services	Interactive Media & Services	Mountain View, California	2014-04-03	0001652044	1998
MO	Altria	Consumer Staples	Tobacco	Richmond, Virginia	1957-03-04	0000764180	1985
AMZN	Amazon	Consumer Discretionary	Broadline Retail	Seattle, Washington	2005-11-18	0001018724	1994
AMCR	Amcor	Materials	Paper & Plastic Packaging Products & Materials	Warmley, Bristol, United Kingdom	2019-06-07	0001748790	2019 (1860)
AEE	Ameren	Utilities	Multi-Utilities	St. Louis, Missouri	1991-09-19	0001002910	1902
AEP	American Electric Power	Utilities	Electric Utilities	Columbus, Ohio	1957-03-04	0000004904	1906
AXP	American Express	Financials	Consumer Finance	New York City, New York	1976-06-30	0000004962	1850
AIG	American International Group	Financials	Multi-line Insurance	New York City, New York	1980-03-31	0000005272	1919
AMT	American Tower	Real Estate	Telecom Tower REITs	Boston, Massachusetts	2007-11-19	0001053507	1995
AWK	American Water Works	Utilities	Water Utilities	Camden, New Jersey	2016-03-04	0001410636	1886
AMP	Ameriprise Financial	Financials	Asset Management & Custody Banks	Minneapolis, Minnesota	2005-10-03	0000820027	1894
AME	Ametek	Industrials	Electrical Components & Equipment	Berwyn, Pennsylvania	2013-09-23	0001037868	1930
AMGN	Amgen	Health Care	Biotechnology	Thousand Oaks, California	1992-01-02	0000318154	1980
APH	Amphenol	Information Technology	Electronic Components	Wallingford, Connecticut	2008-09-30	0000820313	1932
ADI	Analog Devices	Information Technology	Semiconductors	Wilmington, Massachusetts	1999-10-12	0000006281	1965
AON	Aon plc	Financials	Insurance Brokers	London, United Kingdom	1996-04-23	0000315293	1982 (1919)
APA	APA Corporation	Energy	Oil & Gas Exploration & Production	Houston, Texas	1997-07-28	0001841666	1954
APO	Apollo Global Management	Financials	Asset Management & Custody Banks	New York City, New York	2024-12-23	0001858681	1990
AAPL	Apple Inc.	Information Technology	Technology Hardware, Storage & Peripherals	Cupertino, California	1982-11-30	0000320193	1977
AMAT	Applied Materials	Information Technology	Semiconductor Materials & Equipment	Santa Clara, California	1995-03-16	0000006951	1967
APP	AppLovin	Communication Services	Advertising	Palo Alto, California	2025-09-22	0001751008	2012
APTV	Aptiv	Consumer Discretionary	Automotive Parts & Equipment	Schaffhausen, Switzerland	2012-12-24	0001521332	1994
ACGL	Arch Capital Group	Financials	Property & Casualty Insurance	Hamilton, Bermuda	2022-11-01	0000947484	1995
ADM	Archer Daniels Midland	Consumer Staples	Agricultural Products & Services	Chicago, Illinois	1957-03-04	0000007084	1902
ARES	Ares Management	Financials	Asset Management & Custody Banks	Los Angeles, California	2025-12-11	0001176948	1977
ANET	Arista Networks	Information Technology	Communications Equipment	Santa Clara, California	2018-08-28	0001596532	2004
AJG	Arthur J. Gallagher & Co.	Financials	Insurance Brokers	Rolling Meadows, Illinois	2016-05-31	0000354190	1927
AIZ	Assurant	Financials	Multi-line Insurance	Atlanta, Georgia	2007-04-10	0001267238	1892
T	AT&T	Communication Services	Integrated Telecommunication Services	Dallas, Texas	1983-11-30	0000732717	1983 (1885)
ATO	Atmos Energy	Utilities	Gas Utilities	Dallas, Texas	2019-02-15	0000731802	1906
ADSK	Autodesk	Information Technology	Application Software	San Francisco, California	1989-12-01	0000769397	1982
ADP	Automatic Data Processing	Industrials	Human Resource & Employment Services	Roseland, New Jersey	1981-03-31	0000008670	1949
AZO	AutoZone	Consumer Discretionary	Automotive Retail	Memphis, Tennessee	1997-01-02	0000866787	1979
AVY	Avery Dennison	Materials	Paper & Plastic Packaging Products & Materials	Mentor, Ohio	1987-12-31	0000008818	1935
AXON	Axon Enterprise	Industrials	Aerospace & Defense	Scottsdale, Arizona	2023-05-04	0001069183	1993
BKR	Baker Hughes	Energy	Oil & Gas Equipment & Services	Houston, Texas	2017-07-07	0001701605	2017
BALL	Ball Corporation	Materials	Metal, Glass & Plastic Containers	Broomfield, Colorado	1984-10-31	0000009389	1880
BAC	Bank of America	Financials	Diversified Banks	Charlotte, North Carolina	1976-06-30	0000070858	1998 (1923 / 1874)
BAX	Baxter International	Health Care	Health Care Equipment	Deerfield, Illinois	1972-09-30	0000010456	1931
BDX	Becton Dickinson	Health Care	Health Care Equipment	Franklin Lakes, New Jersey	1972-09-30	0000010795	1897
BRK.B	Berkshire Hathaway	Financials	Multi-Sector Holdings	Omaha, Nebraska	2010-02-16	0001067983	1839
BBY	Best Buy	Consumer Discretionary	Computer & Electronics Retail	Richfield, Minnesota	1999-06-29	0000764478	1966
TECH	Bio-Techne	Health Care	Life Sciences Tools & Services	Minneapolis, Minnesota	2021-08-30	0000842023	1976
BIIB	Biogen	Health Care	Biotechnology	Cambridge, Massachusetts	2003-11-13	0000875045	1978
BLK	BlackRock	Financials	Asset Management & Custody Banks	New York City, New York	2011-04-04	0002012383	1988
BX	Blackstone Inc.	Financials	Asset Management & Custody Banks	New York City, New York	2023-09-18	0001393818	1985
XYZ	Block, Inc.	Financials	Transaction & Payment Processing Services	none	2025-07-23	0001512673	2009
BE	Bloom Energy	Industrials	Electrical Components & Equipment	San Jose, California	2026-09-21	0001664703	2001
BNY	BNY Mellon	Financials	Asset Management & Custody Banks	New York City, New York	1995-03-31	0001390777	2007 (1784)
BA	Boeing	Industrials	Aerospace & Defense	Arlington, Virginia	1957-03-04	0000012927	1916
BKNG	Booking Holdings	Consumer Discretionary	Hotels, Resorts & Cruise Lines	Norwalk, Connecticut	2009-11-06	0001075531	1996
BSX	Boston Scientific	Health Care	Health Care Equipment	Marlborough, Massachusetts	1995-02-24	0000885725	1979
BMY	Bristol Myers Squibb	Health Care	Pharmaceuticals	New York City, New York	1957-03-04	0000014272	1989 (1887)
AVGO	Broadcom	Information Technology	Semiconductors	Palo Alto, California	2014-05-08	0001730168	1961
BR	Broadridge Financial Solutions	Industrials	Data Processing & Outsourced Services	Lake Success, New York	2018-06-18	0001383312	1962
BRO	Brown & Brown	Financials	Insurance Brokers	Daytona Beach, Florida	2021-09-20	0000079282	1939
BF.B	Brown–Forman	Consumer Staples	Distillers & Vintners	Louisville, Kentucky	1982-10-31	0000014693	1870
BG	Bunge Global	Consumer Staples	Agricultural Products & Services	Chesterfield, Missouri	2023-03-15	0001996862	1818
BXP	BXP, Inc.	Real Estate	Office REITs	Boston, Massachusetts	2006-04-03	0001037540	1970
CHRW	C.H. Robinson	Industrials	Air Freight & Logistics	Eden Prairie, Minnesota	2007-03-02	0001043277	1905
CDNS	Cadence Design Systems	Information Technology	Application Software	San Jose, California	2017-09-18	0000813672	1988
CPT	Camden Property Trust	Real Estate	Multi-Family Residential REITs	Houston, Texas	2022-04-04	0000906345	1981
COF	Capital One	Financials	Consumer Finance	Tysons Corner, Virginia	1998-07-01	0000927628	1994
CAH	Cardinal Health	Health Care	Health Care Distributors	Dublin, Ohio	1997-05-27	0000721371	1971
CCL	Carnival Corporation	Consumer Discretionary	Hotels, Resorts & Cruise Lines	Miami, Florida	1998-12-22	0000815097	1972
CARR	Carrier Global	Industrials	Building Products	Palm Beach Gardens, Florida	2020-04-03	0001783180	2020 (1915, United Technologies spinoff)
CVNA	Carvana	Consumer Discretionary	Automotive Retail	Tempe, Arizona	2025-12-22	0001690820	2012
CASY	Casey's	Consumer Staples	Food Retail	Ankeny, Iowa	2026-04-09	0000726958	1967
CAT	Caterpillar Inc.	Industrials	Construction Machinery & Heavy Transportation Equipment	Irving, Texas	1957-03-04	0000018230	1925
CBOE	Cboe Global Markets	Financials	Financial Exchanges & Data	Chicago, Illinois	2017-03-01	0001374310	1973
CBRE	CBRE Group	Real Estate	Real Estate Services	Dallas, Texas	2006-11-10	0001138118	1906
CDW	CDW Corporation	Information Technology	Technology Distributors	Vernon Hills, Illinois	2019-09-23	0001402057	1984
COR	Cencora	Health Care	Health Care Distributors	Conshohocken, Pennsylvania	2001-08-30	0001140859	1985
CNC	Centene Corporation	Health Care	Managed Health Care	St. Louis, Missouri	2016-03-30	0001071739	1984
CNP	CenterPoint Energy	Utilities	Multi-Utilities	Houston, Texas	1985-07-31	0001130310	1882
CF	CF Industries	Materials	Fertilizers & Agricultural Chemicals	Deerfield, Illinois	2008-08-27	0001324404	1946
CRL	Charles River Laboratories	Health Care	Life Sciences Tools & Services	Wilmington, Massachusetts	2021-05-14	0001100682	1947
SCHW	Charles Schwab Corporation	Financials	Investment Banking & Brokerage	Westlake, Texas	1997-06-02	0000316709	1971
CHTR	Charter Communications	Communication Services	Cable & Satellite	Stamford, Connecticut	2016-09-08	0001091667	1993
CVX	Chevron Corporation	Energy	Integrated Oil & Gas	Houston, Texas	1957-03-04	0000093410	1879
CMG	Chipotle Mexican Grill	Consumer Discretionary	Restaurants	Newport Beach, California	2011-04-28	0001058090	1993
CB	Chubb Limited	Financials	Property & Casualty Insurance	Zurich, Switzerland	2010-07-15	0000896159	1985
CHD	Church & Dwight	Consumer Staples	Household Products	Ewing, New Jersey	2015-12-29	0000313927	1847
CIEN	Ciena	Information Technology	Communications Equipment	Hanover, Maryland	2026-02-09	0000936395	1992
CI	Cigna	Health Care	Health Care Services	Bloomfield, Connecticut	1976-06-30	0001739940	1982
CINF	Cincinnati Financial	Financials	Property & Casualty Insurance	Fairfield, Ohio	1997-12-18	0000020286	1950
CTAS	Cintas	Industrials	Diversified Support Services	Mason, Ohio	2001-03-01	0000723254	1929
CSCO	Cisco	Information Technology	Communications Equipment	San Jose, California	1993-12-01	0000858877	1984
C	Citigroup	Financials	Diversified Banks	New York City, New York	1988-05-31	0000831001	1998
CFG	Citizens Financial Group	Financials	Regional Banks	Providence, Rhode Island	2016-01-29	0000759944	1828
CLX	Clorox	Consumer Staples	Household Products	Oakland, California	1969-03-31	0000021076	1913
CME	CME Group	Financials	Financial Exchanges & Data	Chicago, Illinois	2006-08-11	0001156375	1848
CMS	CMS Energy	Utilities	Multi-Utilities	Jackson, Michigan	1957-03-04	0000811156	1886
KO	Coca-Cola Company (The)	Consumer Staples	Soft Drinks & Non-alcoholic Beverages	Atlanta, Georgia	1957-03-04	0000021344	1886
CTSH	Cognizant	Information Technology	IT Consulting & Other Services	Teaneck, New Jersey	2006-11-17	0001058290	1994
COHR	Coherent Corp.	Information Technology	Electronic Components	Saxonburg, Pennsylvania	2026-03-23	0000820318	1971
COIN	Coinbase	Financials	Financial Exchanges & Data	New York City, New York	2025-05-19	0001679788	2012
CL	Colgate-Palmolive	Consumer Staples	Household Products	New York City, New York	1957-03-04	0000021665	1806
CMCSA	Comcast	Communication Services	Cable & Satellite	Philadelphia, Pennsylvania	2002-11-19	0001166691	1963
FIX	Comfort Systems USA	Industrials	Construction & Engineering	Houston, Texas	2025-12-22	0001035983	1997
COP	ConocoPhillips	Energy	Oil & Gas Exploration & Production	Houston, Texas	1957-03-04	0001163165	2002
ED	Consolidated Edison	Utilities	Multi-Utilities	New York City, New York	1957-03-04	0001047862	1823
STZ	Constellation Brands	Consumer Staples	Distillers & Vintners	Rochester, New York	2005-07-01	0000016918	1945
CEG	Constellation Energy	Utilities	Electric Utilities	Baltimore, Maryland	2022-02-02	0001868275	1999
COO	Cooper Companies (The)	Health Care	Health Care Supplies	San Ramon, California	2016-09-23	0000711404	1958
CPRT	Copart	Industrials	Diversified Support Services	Dallas, Texas	2018-07-02	0000900075	1982
GLW	Corning Inc.	Information Technology	Electronic Components	Corning, New York	1995-02-27	0000024741	1851
CPAY	Corpay	Financials	Transaction & Payment Processing Services	Atlanta, Georgia	2018-06-20	0001175454	2000
CSGP	CoStar Group	Real Estate	Real Estate Services	Washington, D.C.	2022-09-19	0001057352	1987
COST	Costco	Consumer Staples	Consumer Staples Merchandise Retail	Issaquah, Washington	1993-10-01	0000909832	1976
CRH	CRH plc	Materials	Construction Materials	Dublin, Ireland	2025-12-22	0000849395	1970
CRWD	CrowdStrike	Information Technology	Systems Software	Austin, Texas	2024-06-24	0001535527	2011
CCI	Crown Castle	Real Estate	Telecom Tower REITs	Houston, Texas	2012-03-14	0001051470	1994
CSX	CSX Corporation	Industrials	Rail Transportation	Jacksonville, Florida	1957-03-04	0000277948	1980
CMI	Cummins	Industrials	Construction Machinery & Heavy Transportation Equipment	Columbus, Indiana	1965-03-31	0000026172	1919
CVS	CVS Health	Health Care	Health Care Services	Woonsocket, Rhode Island	1957-03-04	0000064803	1996
DHR	Danaher Corporation	Health Care	Life Sciences Tools & Services	Washington, D.C.	1998-11-18	0000313616	1969
DRI	Darden Restaurants	Consumer Discretionary	Restaurants	Orlando, Florida	1995-05-31	0000940944	1938
DDOG	Datadog	Information Technology	Application Software	New York City, New York	2025-07-09	0001561550	2010
DVA	DaVita	Health Care	Health Care Services	Denver, Colorado	2008-07-31	0000927066	1979
DECK	Deckers Brands	Consumer Discretionary	Footwear	Goleta, California	2024-03-18	0000910521	1973
DE	Deere & Company	Industrials	Agricultural & Farm Machinery	Moline, Illinois	1957-03-04	0000315189	1837
DELL	Dell Technologies	Information Technology	Technology Hardware, Storage & Peripherals	Round Rock, Texas	2024-09-23	0001571996	2016
DAL	Delta Air Lines	Industrials	Passenger Airlines	Atlanta, Georgia	2013-09-11	0000027904	1929
DVN	Devon Energy	Energy	Oil & Gas Exploration & Production	Oklahoma City, Oklahoma	2000-08-30	0001090012	1971
DXCM	Dexcom	Health Care	Health Care Equipment	San Diego, California	2020-05-12	0001093557	1999
FANG	Diamondback Energy	Energy	Oil & Gas Exploration & Production	Midland, Texas	2018-12-03	0001539838	2007
DLR	Digital Realty	Real Estate	Data Center REITs	Austin, Texas	2016-05-18	0001297996	2004
DG	Dollar General	Consumer Staples	Consumer Staples Merchandise Retail	Goodlettsville, Tennessee	2012-12-03	0000029534	1939
DLTR	Dollar Tree	Consumer Staples	Consumer Staples Merchandise Retail	Chesapeake, Virginia	2011-12-19	0000935703	1986
D	Dominion Energy	Utilities	Multi-Utilities	Richmond, Virginia	2016-11-30	0000715957	1983
DPZ	Domino's	Consumer Discretionary	Restaurants	Ann Arbor, Michigan	2020-05-12	0001286681	1960
DASH	DoorDash	Consumer Discretionary	Specialized Consumer Services	San Francisco, California	2025-03-24	0001792789	2012
DOV	Dover Corporation	Industrials	Industrial Machinery & Supplies & Components	Downers Grove, Illinois	1985-10-31	0000029905	1955
DOW	Dow Inc.	Materials	Commodity Chemicals	Midland, Michigan	2019-04-01	0001751788	2019 (1897)
DHI	D. R. Horton	Consumer Discretionary	Homebuilding	Arlington, Texas	2005-06-22	0000882184	1978
DTE	DTE Energy	Utilities	Multi-Utilities	Detroit, Michigan	1957-03-04	0000936340	1995
DUK	Duke Energy	Utilities	Electric Utilities	Charlotte, North Carolina	1976-06-30	0001326160	1904
DD	DuPont	Industrials	Industrial Conglomerates	Wilmington, Delaware	2019-06-03	0001666700	2017 (1802)
ETN	Eaton Corporation	Industrials	Electrical Components & Equipment	Dublin, Ireland	1957-03-04	0001551182	1911
EBAY	eBay Inc.	Consumer Discretionary	Broadline Retail	San Jose, California	2002-07-22	0001065088	1995
ECHO	EchoStar	Communication Services	Wireless Telecommunication Services	Englewood, Colorado	2026-03-23	0001415404	2008
ECL	Ecolab	Materials	Specialty Chemicals	Saint Paul, Minnesota	1989-01-31	0000031462	1923
EIX	Edison International	Utilities	Electric Utilities	Rosemead, California	1957-03-04	0000827052	1886
EW	Edwards Lifesciences	Health Care	Health Care Equipment	Irvine, California	2011-04-01	0001099800	1958
ELV	Elevance Health	Health Care	Managed Health Care	Indianapolis, Indiana	2002-07-25	0001156039	2014 (1946)
EME	Emcor	Industrials	Construction & Engineering	Norwalk, Connecticut	2025-09-22	0000105634	1994
EMR	Emerson Electric	Industrials	Electrical Components & Equipment	Ferguson, Missouri	1965-03-31	0000032604	1890
ETR	Entergy	Utilities	Electric Utilities	New Orleans, Louisiana	1957-03-04	0000065984	1913
EOG	EOG Resources	Energy	Oil & Gas Exploration & Production	Houston, Texas	2000-11-02	0000821189	1999
EQT	EQT Corporation	Energy	Oil & Gas Exploration & Production	Pittsburgh, Pennsylvania	2022-10-03	0000033213	1888
EFX	Equifax	Industrials	Research & Consulting Services	Atlanta, Georgia	1997-06-19	0000033185	1899
EQIX	Equinix	Real Estate	Data Center REITs	Redwood City, California	2015-03-20	0001101239	1998
ERIE	Erie Indemnity	Financials	Insurance Brokers	Erie, Pennsylvania	2024-09-23	0000922621	1925
ESS	Essex Property Trust	Real Estate	Multi-Family Residential REITs	San Mateo, California	2014-04-02	0000920522	1971
EL	Estée Lauder Companies (The)	Consumer Staples	Personal Care Products	New York City, New York	2006-01-05	0001001250	1946
EG	Everest Group	Financials	Reinsurance	Hamilton, Bermuda	2017-06-19	0001095073	1973
EVRG	Evergy	Utilities	Electric Utilities	Kansas City, Missouri	2018-06-05	0001711269	1909
P	Everpure	Information Technology	Technology Hardware, Storage & Peripherals	Santa Clara, California	2026-09-21	0001474432	2009
ES	Eversource Energy	Utilities	Electric Utilities	Hartford, Connecticut	2009-07-24	0000072741	1966
EXC	Exelon	Utilities	Electric Utilities	Chicago, Illinois	1957-03-04	0001109357	2000
EXE	Expand Energy	Energy	Oil & Gas Exploration & Production	Oklahoma City, Oklahoma	2025-03-24	0000895126	1989
EXPE	Expedia Group	Consumer Discretionary	Hotels, Resorts & Cruise Lines	Seattle, Washington	2007-10-02	0001324424	1996
EXPD	Expeditors International	Industrials	Air Freight & Logistics	Seattle, Washington	2007-10-10	0000746515	1979
EXR	Extra Space Storage	Real Estate	Self-Storage REITs	Salt Lake City, Utah	2016-01-19	0001289490	1977
XOM	ExxonMobil	Energy	Integrated Oil & Gas	Irving, Texas	1957-03-04	0002115436	1999
FFIV	F5, Inc.	Information Technology	Communications Equipment	Seattle, Washington	2010-12-20	0001048695	1996
FDS	FactSet	Financials	Financial Exchanges & Data	Norwalk, Connecticut	2021-12-20	0001013237	1978
FICO	Fair Isaac	Information Technology	Application Software	Bozeman, Montana	2023-03-20	0000814547	1956
FAST	Fastenal	Industrials	Trading Companies & Distributors	Winona, Minnesota	2008-09-15	0000815556	1967
FRT	Federal Realty Investment Trust	Real Estate	Retail REITs	Rockville, Maryland	2016-02-01	0000034903	1962
FDX	FedEx	Industrials	Air Freight & Logistics	Memphis, Tennessee	1980-12-31	0001048911	1971
FDXF	FedEx Freight	Industrials	Cargo Ground Transportation	Memphis, Tennessee	2026-06-01	0002082247	1982
FERG	Ferguson Enterprises	Industrials	Trading Companies & Distributors	Newport News, Virginia	2026-08-05	0002011641	1953
FIS	Fidelity National Information Services	Financials	Transaction & Payment Processing Services	Jacksonville, Florida	2006-11-10	0001136893	1968
FITB	Fifth Third Bancorp	Financials	Regional Banks	Cincinnati, Ohio	1996-03-29	0000035527	1858
FSLR	First Solar	Information Technology	Semiconductors	Tempe, Arizona	2022-12-19	0001274494	1999
FE	FirstEnergy	Utilities	Electric Utilities	Akron, Ohio	1997-11-28	0001031296	1997
FISV	Fiserv	Financials	Transaction & Payment Processing Services	Brookfield, Wisconsin	2001-04-02	0000798354	1984
FLEX	Flex Ltd.	Information Technology	Electronic Manufacturing Services	Austin, Texas	2026-06-22	0000866374	1969
F	Ford Motor Company	Consumer Discretionary	Automobile Manufacturers	Dearborn, Michigan	1957-03-04	0000037996	1903
FTNT	Fortinet	Information Technology	Systems Software	Sunnyvale, California	2018-10-11	0001262039	2000
FTV	Fortive	Industrials	Industrial Machinery & Supplies & Components	Everett, Washington	2016-07-01	0001659166	2016
FOXA	Fox Corporation (Class A)	Communication Services	Broadcasting	New York City, New York	2019-03-19	0001754301	2019
FOX	Fox Corporation (Class B)	Communication Services	Broadcasting	New York City, New York	2019-03-19	0001754301	2019
BEN	Franklin Resources	Financials	Asset Management & Custody Banks	San Mateo, California	1998-04-30	0000038777	1947
FCX	Freeport-McMoRan	Materials	Copper	Phoenix, Arizona	2011-07-01	0000831259	1912
GRMN	Garmin	Consumer Discretionary	Consumer Electronics	Schaffhausen, Switzerland	2012-12-12	0001121788	1989
IT	Gartner	Information Technology	IT Consulting & Other Services	Stamford, Connecticut	2017-04-05	0000749251	1979
GE	GE Aerospace	Industrials	Aerospace & Defense	Evendale, Ohio	1957-03-04	0000040545	1892
GEHC	GE HealthCare	Health Care	Health Care Equipment	Chicago, Illinois	2023-01-04	0001932393	1994
GEV	GE Vernova	Industrials	Heavy Electrical Equipment	Cambridge, Massachusetts	2024-04-02	0001996810	2024
GEN	Gen Digital	Information Technology	Systems Software	Tempe, Arizona	2003-03-25	0000849399	1982
GNRC	Generac	Industrials	Heavy Electrical Equipment	Waukesha, Wisconsin	2021-03-22	0001474735	1959
GD	General Dynamics	Industrials	Aerospace & Defense	Reston, Virginia	1957-03-04	0000040533	1899
GIS	General Mills	Consumer Staples	Packaged Foods & Meats	Golden Valley, Minnesota	1957-03-04	0000040704	1856
GM	General Motors	Consumer Discretionary	Automobile Manufacturers	Detroit, Michigan	2013-06-06	0001467858	1908
GPC	Genuine Parts Company	Consumer Discretionary	Distributors	Atlanta, Georgia	1973-12-31	0000040987	1925
GILD	Gilead Sciences	Health Care	Biotechnology	Foster City, California	2004-07-01	0000882095	1987
GPN	Global Payments	Financials	Transaction & Payment Processing Services	Atlanta, Georgia	2016-04-25	0001123360	2000
GL	Globe Life	Financials	Life & Health Insurance	McKinney, Texas	1989-04-30	0000320335	1900
GDDY	GoDaddy	Information Technology	Internet Services & Infrastructure	Tempe, Arizona	2024-06-24	0001609711	1997
GS	Goldman Sachs	Financials	Investment Banking & Brokerage	New York City, New York	2002-07-22	0000886982	1869
HAL	Halliburton	Energy	Oil & Gas Equipment & Services	Houston, Texas	1957-03-04	0000045012	1919
HIG	Hartford (The)	Financials	Property & Casualty Insurance	Hartford, Connecticut	1957-03-04	0000874766	1810
HAS	Hasbro	Consumer Discretionary	Leisure Products	Pawtucket, Rhode Island	1984-09-30	0000046080	1923
HCA	HCA Healthcare	Health Care	Health Care Facilities	Nashville, Tennessee	2015-01-27	0000860730	1968
DOC	Healthpeak Properties	Real Estate	Health Care REITs	Denver, Colorado	2008-03-31	0000765880	1985
HSIC	Henry Schein	Health Care	Health Care Distributors	Melville, New York	2015-03-17	0001000228	1932
HSY	Hershey Company (The)	Consumer Staples	Packaged Foods & Meats	Hershey, Pennsylvania	1957-03-04	0000047111	1894
HPE	Hewlett Packard Enterprise	Information Technology	Technology Hardware, Storage & Peripherals	Houston, Texas	2015-11-02	0001645590	2015
HLT	Hilton Worldwide	Consumer Discretionary	Hotels, Resorts & Cruise Lines	Tysons Corner, Virginia	2017-06-19	0001585689	1919
HD	Home Depot (The)	Consumer Discretionary	Home Improvement Retail	Atlanta, Georgia	1988-03-31	0000354950	1978
HONA	Honeywell Aerospace	Industrials	Aerospace & Defense	Phoenix, Arizona	2026-06-29	0002089271	1914
HON	Honeywell Technologies	Industrials	Industrial Conglomerates	Charlotte, North Carolina	1957-03-04	0000773840	1906
HRL	Hormel Foods	Consumer Staples	Packaged Foods & Meats	Austin, Minnesota	2009-03-04	0000048465	1891
HST	Host Hotels & Resorts	Real Estate	Hotel & Resort REITs	Bethesda, Maryland	2007-03-20	0001070750	1993
HWM	Howmet Aerospace	Industrials	Aerospace & Defense	Pittsburgh, Pennsylvania	2016-10-21	0000004281	1888
HPQ	HP Inc.	Information Technology	Technology Hardware, Storage & Peripherals	Palo Alto, California	1974-12-31	0000047217	1939 (2015)
HUBB	Hubbell Incorporated	Industrials	Industrial Machinery & Supplies & Components	Shelton, Connecticut	2023-10-18	0000048898	1888
HUM	Humana	Health Care	Managed Health Care	Louisville, Kentucky	2012-12-10	0000049071	1961
HBAN	Huntington Bancshares	Financials	Regional Banks	Columbus, Ohio; Detroit, Michigan	1997-08-28	0000049196	1866
HII	Huntington Ingalls Industries	Industrials	Aerospace & Defense	Newport News, Virginia	2018-01-03	0001501585	2011
IBM	IBM	Information Technology	IT Consulting & Other Services	Armonk, New York	1957-03-04	0000051143	1911
IEX	IDEX Corporation	Industrials	Industrial Machinery & Supplies & Components	Northbrook, Illinois	2019-08-09	0000832101	1988
IDXX	Idexx Laboratories	Health Care	Health Care Equipment	Westbrook, Maine	2017-01-05	0000874716	1983
ITW	Illinois Tool Works	Industrials	Industrial Machinery & Supplies & Components	Glenview, Illinois	1986-02-28	0000049826	1912
ILMN	Illumina, Inc.	Health Care	Life Sciences Tools & Services	San Diego, California	2026-09-21	0001110803	1998
INCY	Incyte	Health Care	Biotechnology	Wilmington, Delaware	2017-02-28	0000879169	1991
IR	Ingersoll Rand	Industrials	Industrial Machinery & Supplies & Components	Davidson, North Carolina	2020-03-03	0001699150	1859
PODD	Insulet Corporation	Health Care	Health Care Equipment	Acton, Massachusetts	2023-03-15	0001145197	2000
INTC	Intel	Information Technology	Semiconductors	Santa Clara, California	1976-12-31	0000050863	1968
IBKR	Interactive Brokers	Financials	Investment Banking & Brokerage	Greenwich, Connecticut	2025-08-28	0001381197	1977
ICE	Intercontinental Exchange	Financials	Financial Exchanges & Data	Atlanta, Georgia	2007-09-26	0001571949	2000
IFF	International Flavors & Fragrances	Materials	Specialty Chemicals	New York City, New York	1976-03-31	0000051253	1958 (1889)
IP	International Paper	Materials	Paper & Plastic Packaging Products & Materials	Memphis, Tennessee	1957-03-04	0000051434	1898
INTU	Intuit	Information Technology	Application Software	Mountain View, California	2000-12-05	0000896878	1983
ISRG	Intuitive Surgical	Health Care	Health Care Equipment	Sunnyvale, California	2008-06-02	0001035267	1995
IVZ	Invesco	Financials	Asset Management & Custody Banks	Atlanta, Georgia	2008-08-21	0000914208	1935
INVH	Invitation Homes	Real Estate	Single-Family Residential REITs	Dallas, Texas	2022-09-19	0001687229	2012
IQV	IQVIA	Health Care	Life Sciences Tools & Services	Durham, North Carolina	2017-08-29	0001478242	1982
IRM	Iron Mountain	Real Estate	Other Specialized REITs	Portsmouth, New Hampshire	2009-01-06	0001020569	1951
JBHT	J.B. Hunt	Industrials	Cargo Ground Transportation	Lowell, Arkansas	2015-07-01	0000728535	1961
JBL	Jabil	Information Technology	Electronic Manufacturing Services	St. Petersburg, Florida	2023-12-18	0000898293	1966
JKHY	Jack Henry & Associates	Financials	Transaction & Payment Processing Services	Monett, Missouri	2018-11-13	0000779152	1976
J	Jacobs Solutions	Industrials	Construction & Engineering	Dallas, Texas	2007-10-26	0000052988	1947
JNJ	Johnson & Johnson	Health Care	Pharmaceuticals	New Brunswick, New Jersey	1973-06-30	0000200406	1886
JCI	Johnson Controls	Industrials	Building Products	Cork, Ireland	2010-08-27	0000833444	1885
JPM	JPMorgan Chase	Financials	Diversified Banks	New York City, New York	1975-06-30	0000019617	2000 (1799 / 1871)
KDP	Keurig Dr Pepper	Consumer Staples	Soft Drinks & Non-alcoholic Beverages	Burlington, Massachusetts	2022-06-21	0001418135	1981
KEY	KeyCorp	Financials	Regional Banks	Cleveland, Ohio	1994-03-01	0000091576	1825
KEYS	Keysight Technologies	Information Technology	Electronic Equipment & Instruments	Santa Rosa, California	2018-11-06	0001601046	2014 (1939)
KMB	Kimberly-Clark	Consumer Staples	Household Products	Irving, Texas	1957-03-04	0000055785	1872
KIM	Kimco Realty	Real Estate	Retail REITs	Jericho, New York	2006-04-04	0000879101	1958
KMI	Kinder Morgan	Energy	Oil & Gas Storage & Transportation	Houston, Texas	2012-05-25	0001506307	1997
KKR	KKR & Co.	Financials	Asset Management & Custody Banks	New York City, New York	2024-06-24	0001404912	1976
KLAC	KLA Corporation	Information Technology	Semiconductor Materials & Equipment	Milpitas, California	1997-09-30	0000319201	1975/1977 (1997)
KHC	Kraft Heinz	Consumer Staples	Packaged Foods & Meats	Chicago, Illinois; Pittsburgh, Pennsylvania	2015-07-06	0001637459	2015 (1869)
KR	Kroger	Consumer Staples	Food Retail	Cincinnati, Ohio	1957-03-04	0000056873	1883
LHX	L3Harris	Industrials	Aerospace & Defense	Melbourne, Florida	2008-09-22	0000202058	2019 (L3 1997, Harris 1895)
LH	Labcorp	Health Care	Health Care Services	Burlington, North Carolina	2004-11-01	0000920148	1978
LRCX	Lam Research	Information Technology	Semiconductor Materials & Equipment	Fremont, California	2012-06-29	0000707549	1980
LVS	Las Vegas Sands	Consumer Discretionary	Casinos & Gaming	Las Vegas, Nevada	2019-10-03	0001300514	1988
LDOS	Leidos	Industrials	Diversified Support Services	Reston, Virginia	2019-08-09	0001336920	1969
LEN	Lennar	Consumer Discretionary	Homebuilding	Miami, Florida	2005-10-04	0000920760	1954
LII	Lennox International	Industrials	Building Products	Richardson, Texas	2024-12-23	0001069202	1895
LLY	Lilly (Eli)	Health Care	Pharmaceuticals	Indianapolis, Indiana	1970-12-31	0000059478	1876
LIN	Linde plc	Materials	Industrial Gases	Guildford, United Kingdom	1992-07-01	0001707925	1879
LYV	Live Nation Entertainment	Communication Services	Movies & Entertainment	Beverly Hills, California	2019-12-23	0001335258	2010
LMT	Lockheed Martin	Industrials	Aerospace & Defense	Bethesda, Maryland	1957-03-04	0000936468	1995
L	Loews Corporation	Financials	Multi-line Insurance	New York City, New York	1995-05-31	0000060086	1959
LOW	Lowe's	Consumer Discretionary	Home Improvement Retail	Mooresville, North Carolina	1984-02-29	0000060667	1904/1946/1959
LULU	Lululemon Athletica	Consumer Discretionary	Apparel, Accessories & Luxury Goods	Vancouver, Canada	2023-10-18	0001397187	1998
LITE	Lumentum	Information Technology	Communications Equipment	San Jose, California	2026-03-23	0001633978	2015
LYB	LyondellBasell	Materials	Specialty Chemicals	Rotterdam, Netherlands	2012-09-05	0001489393	2007
MTB	M&T Bank	Financials	Regional Banks	Buffalo, New York	2004-02-23	0000036270	1856
MPC	Marathon Petroleum	Energy	Oil & Gas Refining & Marketing	Findlay, Ohio	2011-07-01	0001510295	2009 (1887)
MAR	Marriott International	Consumer Discretionary	Hotels, Resorts & Cruise Lines	Bethesda, Maryland	1998-05-29	0001048286	1927
MRSH	Marsh McLennan	Financials	Insurance Brokers	New York City, New York	1987-08-31	0000062709	1905
MLM	Martin Marietta Materials	Materials	Construction Materials	Raleigh, North Carolina	2014-07-02	0000916076	1993
MRVL	Marvell Technology	Information Technology	Semiconductors	Santa Clara, California	2026-06-22	0001835632	1995
MAS	Masco	Industrials	Building Products	Livonia, Michigan	1981-06-30	0000062996	1929
MA	Mastercard	Financials	Transaction & Payment Processing Services	Harrison, New York	2008-07-18	0001141391	1966
MKC	McCormick & Company	Consumer Staples	Packaged Foods & Meats	Hunt Valley, Maryland	2003-03-20	0000063754	1889
MCD	McDonald's	Consumer Discretionary	Restaurants	Chicago, Illinois	1970-06-30	0000063908	1940
MCK	McKesson	Health Care	Health Care Distributors	Irving, Texas	1999-01-13	0000927653	1833
MDT	Medtronic	Health Care	Health Care Equipment	Galway, Ireland	1986-10-31	0001613103	1949
MRK	Merck & Co.	Health Care	Pharmaceuticals	Kenilworth, New Jersey	1957-03-04	0000310158	1891
META	Meta Platforms	Communication Services	Interactive Media & Services	Menlo Park, California	2013-12-23	0001326801	2004
MET	MetLife	Financials	Life & Health Insurance	New York City, New York	2000-12-11	0001099219	1868
MTD	Mettler Toledo	Health Care	Life Sciences Tools & Services	Columbus, Ohio	2016-09-06	0001037646	1945
MGM	MGM Resorts	Consumer Discretionary	Casinos & Gaming	Paradise, Nevada	2017-07-26	0000789570	1986
MCHP	Microchip Technology	Information Technology	Semiconductors	Chandler, Arizona	2007-09-07	0000827054	1989
MU	Micron Technology	Information Technology	Semiconductors	Boise, Idaho	1994-09-27	0000723125	1978
MSFT	Microsoft	Information Technology	Systems Software	Redmond, Washington	1994-06-01	0000789019	1975
MAA	Mid-America Apartment Communities	Real Estate	Multi-Family Residential REITs	Memphis, Tennessee	2016-12-02	0000912595	1977
MRNA	Moderna	Health Care	Biotechnology	Cambridge, Massachusetts	2021-07-21	0001682852	2010
MDLZ	Mondelez International	Consumer Staples	Packaged Foods & Meats	Chicago, Illinois	2012-10-02	0001103982	2012
MPWR	Monolithic Power Systems	Information Technology	Semiconductors	Kirkland, Washington	2021-02-12	0001280452	1997
MNST	Monster Beverage	Consumer Staples	Soft Drinks & Non-alcoholic Beverages	Corona, California	2012-06-28	0000865752	2012 (1935)
MCO	Moody's Corporation	Financials	Financial Exchanges & Data	New York City, New York	1998-07-01	0001059556	1909
MS	Morgan Stanley	Financials	Investment Banking & Brokerage	New York City, New York	1993-07-29	0000895421	1935
MOS	Mosaic Company (The)	Materials	Fertilizers & Agricultural Chemicals	Tampa, Florida	2011-09-26	0001285785	2004 (1865 / 1909)
MSI	Motorola Solutions	Information Technology	Communications Equipment	Chicago, Illinois	1957-03-04	0000068505	1928 (2011)
MSCI	MSCI	Financials	Financial Exchanges & Data	New York City, New York	2018-04-04	0001408198	1969
NDAQ	Nasdaq, Inc.	Financials	Financial Exchanges & Data	New York City, New York	2008-10-22	0001120193	1971
NTAP	NetApp	Information Technology	Technology Hardware, Storage & Peripherals	San Jose, California	1999-06-25	0001002047	1992
NFLX	Netflix	Communication Services	Movies & Entertainment	Los Gatos, California	2010-12-20	0001065280	1997
NEM	Newmont	Materials	Gold	Denver, Colorado	1969-06-30	0001164727	1921
NWSA	News Corp (Class A)	Communication Services	Publishing	New York City, New York	2013-08-01	0001564708	2013 (News Corporation 1980)
NWS	News Corp (Class B)	Communication Services	Publishing	New York City, New York	2015-09-18	0001564708	2013 (News Corporation 1980)
NEE	NextEra Energy	Utilities	Multi-Utilities	Juno Beach, Florida	1976-06-30	0000753308	1984 (1925)
NKE	Nike, Inc.	Consumer Discretionary	Apparel, Accessories & Luxury Goods	Washington County, Oregon	1988-11-30	0000320187	1964
NI	NiSource	Utilities	Multi-Utilities	Merrillville, Indiana	2000-11-02	0001111711	1912
NDSN	Nordson Corporation	Industrials	Industrial Machinery & Supplies & Components	Westlake, Ohio	2022-02-15	0000072331	1935
NSC	Norfolk Southern	Industrials	Rail Transportation	Atlanta, Georgia	1957-03-04	0000702165	1881/1894 (1980)
NTRS	Northern Trust	Financials	Asset Management & Custody Banks	Chicago, Illinois	1998-01-30	0000073124	1889
NOC	Northrop Grumman	Industrials	Aerospace & Defense	West Falls Church, Virginia	1957-03-04	0001133421	1994 (Northrop 1939, Grumman 1930)
NCLH	Norwegian Cruise Line Holdings	Consumer Discretionary	Hotels, Resorts & Cruise Lines	Miami-Dade County, Florida	2017-10-13	0001513761	2011 (1966)
NRG	NRG Energy	Utilities	Independent Power Producers & Energy Traders	Houston, Texas	2010-01-29	0001013871	1992
NUE	Nucor	Materials	Steel	Charlotte, North Carolina	1985-04-30	0000073309	1940
NVDA	Nvidia	Information Technology	Semiconductors	Santa Clara, California	2001-11-30	0001045810	1993
NVR	NVR, Inc.	Consumer Discretionary	Homebuilding	Reston, Virginia	2019-09-26	0000906163	1980
NXPI	NXP Semiconductors	Information Technology	Semiconductors	Eindhoven, Netherlands	2021-03-22	0001413447	1953
ORLY	O'Reilly Automotive	Consumer Discretionary	Automotive Retail	Springfield, Missouri	2009-03-27	0000898173	1957
OXY	Occidental Petroleum	Energy	Oil & Gas Exploration & Production	Houston, Texas	1957-03-04	0000797468	1920
OKTA	Okta, Inc.	Information Technology	Application Software	San Francisco, California	2026-11-04	0001660134	2009
ODFL	Old Dominion	Industrials	Cargo Ground Transportation	Thomasville, North Carolina	2019-12-09	0000878927	1934
OMC	Omnicom Group	Communication Services	Advertising	New York City, New York	1997-12-31	0000029989	1986
ON	ON Semiconductor	Information Technology	Semiconductors	Phoenix, Arizona	2022-06-21	0001097864	1999
OKE	Oneok	Energy	Oil & Gas Storage & Transportation	Tulsa, Oklahoma	2010-03-15	0001039684	1906
ORCL	Oracle Corporation	Information Technology	Application Software	Austin, Texas	1989-08-31	0001341439	1977
OTIS	Otis Worldwide	Industrials	Industrial Machinery & Supplies & Components	Farmington, Connecticut	2020-04-03	0001781335	2020 (1853, United Technologies spinoff)
PCAR	Paccar	Industrials	Construction Machinery & Heavy Transportation Equipment	Bellevue, Washington	1980-12-31	0000075362	1905
PKG	Packaging Corporation of America	Materials	Paper & Plastic Packaging Products & Materials	Lake Forest, Illinois	2017-07-26	0000075677	1959
PLTR	Palantir Technologies	Information Technology	Application Software	Aventura, Florida	2024-09-23	0001321655	2003
PANW	Palo Alto Networks	Information Technology	Systems Software	Santa Clara, California	2023-06-20	0001327567	2005
PH	Parker Hannifin	Industrials	Industrial Machinery & Supplies & Components	Cleveland, Ohio	1985-11-30	0000076334	1917
PAYX	Paychex	Industrials	Human Resource & Employment Services	Penfield, New York	1998-10-01	0000723531	1971
PYPL	PayPal	Financials	Transaction & Payment Processing Services	San Jose, California	2015-07-20	0001633917	1998
PNR	Pentair	Industrials	Industrial Machinery & Supplies & Components	Worsley, United Kingdom	2012-10-01	0000077360	1966
PEP	PepsiCo	Consumer Staples	Soft Drinks & Non-alcoholic Beverages	Purchase, New York	1957-03-04	0000077476	1898
PFE	Pfizer	Health Care	Pharmaceuticals	New York City, New York	1957-03-04	0000078003	1849
PCG	PG&E Corporation	Utilities	Multi-Utilities	Oakland, California	2022-10-03	0001004980	1905
PM	Philip Morris International	Consumer Staples	Tobacco	New York City, New York	2008-03-31	0001413329	2008 (1847)
PSX	Phillips 66	Energy	Oil & Gas Refining & Marketing	Houston, Texas	2012-05-01	0001534701	2012 (1917)
PNW	Pinnacle West Capital	Utilities	Multi-Utilities	Phoenix, Arizona	1999-10-04	0000764622	1985
PNC	PNC Financial Services	Financials	Diversified Banks	Pittsburgh, Pennsylvania	1988-04-30	0000713676	1845
PPG	PPG Industries	Materials	Specialty Chemicals	Pittsburgh, Pennsylvania	1957-03-04	0000079879	1883
PPL	PPL Corporation	Utilities	Electric Utilities	Allentown, Pennsylvania	2001-10-01	0000922224	1920
PFG	Principal Financial Group	Financials	Life & Health Insurance	Des Moines, Iowa	2002-07-22	0001126328	1879
PG	Procter & Gamble	Consumer Staples	Personal Care Products	Cincinnati, Ohio	1957-03-04	0000080424	1837
PGR	Progressive Corporation	Financials	Property & Casualty Insurance	Mayfield Village, Ohio	1997-08-04	0000080661	1937
PLD	Prologis	Real Estate	Industrial REITs	San Francisco, California	2003-07-17	0001045609	1983
PRU	Prudential Financial	Financials	Life & Health Insurance	Newark, New Jersey	2002-07-22	0001137774	1875
PTC	PTC Inc.	Information Technology	Application Software	Boston, Massachusetts	2021-04-20	0000857005	1985
PEG	Public Service Enterprise Group	Utilities	Electric Utilities	Newark, New Jersey	1957-03-04	0000788784	1903
PSA	Public Storage	Real Estate	Self-Storage REITs	Glendale, California	2005-08-19	0001393311	1972
PHM	PulteGroup	Consumer Discretionary	Homebuilding	Atlanta, Georgia	1984-04-30	0000822416	1956
Q	Qnity Electronics	Information Technology	Semiconductor Materials & Equipment	Wilmington, Delaware	2025-11-03	0002058873	2025
QCOM	Qualcomm	Information Technology	Semiconductors	San Diego, California	1999-07-22	0000804328	1985
PWR	Quanta Services	Industrials	Construction & Engineering	Houston, Texas	2009-07-01	0001050915	1997
DGX	Quest Diagnostics	Health Care	Health Care Services	Secaucus, New Jersey	2002-12-12	0001022079	1967
RL	Ralph Lauren Corporation	Consumer Discretionary	Apparel, Accessories & Luxury Goods	New York City, New York	2007-02-02	0001037038	1967
RJF	Raymond James Financial	Financials	Investment Banking & Brokerage	St. Petersburg, Florida	2017-03-20	0000720005	1962
RDDT	Reddit	Communication Services	Interactive Media & Services	San Francisco, California	2026-08-18	0001713445	2005
O	Realty Income	Real Estate	Retail REITs	San Diego, California	2015-04-07	0000726728	1969
REG	Regency Centers	Real Estate	Retail REITs	Jacksonville, Florida	2017-03-02	0000910606	1963
REGN	Regeneron Pharmaceuticals	Health Care	Biotechnology	Tarrytown, New York	2013-05-01	0000872589	1988
RF	Regions Financial Corporation	Financials	Regional Banks	Birmingham, Alabama	1998-08-28	0001281761	1971
RSG	Republic Services	Industrials	Environmental & Facilities Services	Phoenix, Arizona	2008-12-05	0001060391	1998 (1981)
RMD	ResMed	Health Care	Health Care Equipment	San Diego, California	2017-07-26	0000943819	1989
RVTY	Revvity	Health Care	Health Care Equipment	Waltham, Massachusetts	1985-05-31	0000031791	1937
HOOD	Robinhood Markets	Financials	Investment Banking & Brokerage	Menlo Park, California	2025-09-22	0001783879	2013
ROK	Rockwell Automation	Industrials	Electrical Components & Equipment	Milwaukee, Wisconsin	2000-03-12	0001024478	1903
ROL	Rollins, Inc.	Industrials	Environmental & Facilities Services	Atlanta, Georgia	2018-10-01	0000084839	1948
ROP	Roper Technologies	Information Technology	Electronic Equipment & Instruments	Sarasota, Florida	2009-12-23	0000882835	1981
ROST	Ross Stores	Consumer Discretionary	Apparel Retail	Dublin, California	2009-12-21	0000745732	1982
RCL	Royal Caribbean Group	Consumer Discretionary	Hotels, Resorts & Cruise Lines	Miami, Florida	2014-12-05	0000884887	1997
RTX	RTX Corporation	Industrials	Aerospace & Defense	Waltham, Massachusetts	1957-03-04	0000101829	1922
SPGI	S&P Global	Financials	Financial Exchanges & Data	New York City, New York	1957-03-04	0000064040	1917
CRM	Salesforce	Information Technology	Application Software	San Francisco, California	2008-09-15	0001108524	1999
SNDK	Sandisk	Information Technology	Technology Hardware, Storage & Peripherals	Milpitas, California	2025-11-28	0002023554	1988
SBAC	SBA Communications	Real Estate	Telecom Tower REITs	Boca Raton, Florida	2017-09-01	0001034054	1989
SLB	Schlumberger	Energy	Oil & Gas Equipment & Services	Houston, Texas	1957-03-04	0000087347	1926
STX	Seagate Technology	Information Technology	Technology Hardware, Storage & Peripherals	Dublin, Ireland	2012-07-02	0001137789	1979
SRE	Sempra	Utilities	Multi-Utilities	San Diego, California	2017-03-17	0001032208	1998
NOW	ServiceNow	Information Technology	Systems Software	Santa Clara, California	2019-11-21	0001373715	2003
SHW	Sherwin-Williams	Materials	Specialty Chemicals	Cleveland, Ohio	1964-06-30	0000089800	1866
SPG	Simon Property Group	Real Estate	Retail REITs	Indianapolis, Indiana	2002-06-26	0001063761	2003
SKYD	Skydance	Communication Services	Movies & Entertainment	New York City, New York	1994-09-30	0002041610	2025 (Paramount Pictures 1912)
SWKS	Skyworks Solutions	Information Technology	Semiconductors	Irvine, California	2015-03-12	0000004127	2002
SJM	J.M. Smucker Company (The)	Consumer Staples	Packaged Foods & Meats	Orrville, Ohio	2008-11-06	0000091419	1897
SW	Smurfit Westrock	Materials	Paper & Plastic Packaging Products & Materials	Dublin, Ireland	2024-07-08	0002005951	1934
SNA	Snap-on	Industrials	Industrial Machinery & Supplies & Components	Kenosha, Wisconsin	1982-09-30	0000091440	1920
SOLV	Solventum	Health Care	Health Care Technology	Saint Paul, Minnesota	2024-04-01	0001964738	2023
SO	Southern Company	Utilities	Electric Utilities	Atlanta, Georgia	1957-03-04	0000092122	1945
LUV	Southwest Airlines	Industrials	Passenger Airlines	Dallas, Texas	1994-07-01	0000092380	1967
SWK	Stanley Black & Decker	Industrials	Industrial Machinery & Supplies & Components	New Britain, Connecticut	1982-09-30	0000093556	1843
SBUX	Starbucks	Consumer Discretionary	Restaurants	Seattle, Washington	2000-06-07	0000829224	1971
STT	State Street Corporation	Financials	Asset Management & Custody Banks	Boston, Massachusetts	2003-03-14	0000093751	1792
STLD	Steel Dynamics	Materials	Steel	Fort Wayne, Indiana	2022-12-22	0001022671	1993
STE	Steris	Health Care	Health Care Equipment	Dublin, Ireland	2019-12-23	0001757898	1985
SYK	Stryker Corporation	Health Care	Health Care Equipment	Kalamazoo, Michigan	2000-12-12	0000310764	1941
SMCI	Supermicro	Information Technology	Technology Hardware, Storage & Peripherals	San Jose, California	2024-03-18	0001375365	1993
SYF	Synchrony Financial	Financials	Consumer Finance	Stamford, Connecticut	2015-11-18	0001601712	2003
SNPS	Synopsys	Information Technology	Application Software	Sunnyvale, California	2017-03-16	0000883241	1986
SYY	Sysco	Consumer Staples	Food Distributors	Houston, Texas	1986-12-31	0000096021	1969
TMUS	T-Mobile US	Communication Services	Wireless Telecommunication Services	Bellevue, Washington	2019-07-15	0001283699	1994
TROW	T. Rowe Price	Financials	Asset Management & Custody Banks	Baltimore, Maryland	2019-07-29	0001113169	1937
TTWO	Take-Two Interactive	Communication Services	Interactive Home Entertainment	New York City, New York	2018-03-19	0000946581	1993
TPR	Tapestry, Inc.	Consumer Discretionary	Apparel, Accessories & Luxury Goods	New York City, New York	2004-09-01	0001116132	2017
TRGP	Targa Resources	Energy	Oil & Gas Storage & Transportation	Houston, Texas	2022-10-12	0001389170	2005
TGT	Target Corporation	Consumer Staples	Consumer Staples Merchandise Retail	Minneapolis, Minnesota	1976-12-31	0000027419	1902
TEL	TE Connectivity	Information Technology	Electronic Manufacturing Services	Galway, Ireland	2011-10-17	0001385157	2007
TDY	Teledyne Technologies	Information Technology	Electronic Equipment & Instruments	Thousand Oaks, California	2020-06-22	0001094285	1960
TER	Teradyne	Information Technology	Semiconductor Materials & Equipment	North Reading, Massachusetts	2020-09-21	0000097210	1960
TSLA	Tesla, Inc.	Consumer Discretionary	Automobile Manufacturers	Austin, Texas	2020-12-21	0001318605	2003
TXN	Texas Instruments	Information Technology	Semiconductors	Dallas, Texas	2001-03-12	0000097476	1930
TPL	Texas Pacific Land Corporation	Energy	Oil & Gas Exploration & Production	Dallas, Texas	2024-11-26	0001811074	1888
TXT	Textron	Industrials	Aerospace & Defense	Providence, Rhode Island	1978-12-31	0000217346	1923
TMO	Thermo Fisher Scientific	Health Care	Life Sciences Tools & Services	Waltham, Massachusetts	2004-08-03	0000097745	2006 (1902)
TJX	TJX Companies	Consumer Discretionary	Apparel Retail	Framingham, Massachusetts	1985-09-30	0000109198	1987
TKO	TKO Group Holdings	Communication Services	Movies & Entertainment	New York City, New York	2025-03-24	0001973266	2023
TSCO	Tractor Supply	Consumer Discretionary	Other Specialty Retail	Brentwood, Tennessee	2014-01-24	0000916365	1938
TT	Trane Technologies	Industrials	Building Products	Dublin, Ireland	2010-11-17	0001466258	1871
TDG	TransDigm Group	Industrials	Aerospace & Defense	Cleveland, Ohio	2016-06-03	0001260221	1993
TRV	Travelers Companies (The)	Financials	Property & Casualty Insurance	New York City, New York	2002-08-21	0000086312	1853
TRMB	Trimble Inc.	Information Technology	Application Software	Westminster, Colorado	2021-01-21	0000864749	1978
TFC	Truist Financial	Financials	Diversified Banks	Charlotte, North Carolina	1997-12-04	0000092230	1872
TWLO	Twilio	Information Technology	Systems Software	San Francisco, California	2026-10-06	0001447669	2008
TYL	Tyler Technologies	Information Technology	Application Software	Plano, Texas	2020-06-22	0000860731	1966
TSN	Tyson Foods	Consumer Staples	Packaged Foods & Meats	Springdale, Arkansas	2005-08-10	0000100493	1935
USB	U.S. Bancorp	Financials	Diversified Banks	Minneapolis, Minnesota	1999-11-01	0000036104	1968
UBER	Uber	Industrials	Passenger Ground Transportation	San Francisco, California	2023-12-18	0001543151	2009
UDR	UDR, Inc.	Real Estate	Multi-Family Residential REITs	Highlands Ranch, Colorado	2016-03-07	0000074208	1972
ULTA	Ulta Beauty	Consumer Discretionary	Other Specialty Retail	Bolingbrook, Illinois	2016-04-18	0001403568	1990
UNP	Union Pacific Corporation	Industrials	Rail Transportation	Omaha, Nebraska	1957-03-04	0000100885	1862
UAL	United Airlines Holdings	Industrials	Passenger Airlines	Chicago, Illinois	2015-09-03	0000100517	1967
UPS	United Parcel Service	Industrials	Air Freight & Logistics	Sandy Springs, Georgia	2002-07-22	0001090727	1907
URI	United Rentals	Industrials	Trading Companies & Distributors	Stamford, Connecticut	2014-09-20	0001067701	1997
UNH	UnitedHealth Group	Health Care	Managed Health Care	Eden Prairie, Minnesota	1994-07-01	0000731766	1977
UHS	Universal Health Services	Health Care	Health Care Facilities	King of Prussia, Pennsylvania	2014-09-20	0000352915	1979
VLO	Valero Energy	Energy	Oil & Gas Refining & Marketing	San Antonio, Texas	2002-12-20	0001035002	1980
VEEV	Veeva Systems	Health Care	Health Care Technology	Pleasanton, California	2026-05-07	0001393052	2007
VTR	Ventas	Real Estate	Health Care REITs	Chicago, Illinois	2009-03-04	0000740260	1998
VLTO	Veralto	Industrials	Environmental & Facilities Services	Waltham, Massachusetts	2023-10-02	0001967680	2023
VRSN	Verisign	Information Technology	Internet Services & Infrastructure	Reston, Virginia	2006-02-01	0001014473	1995
VRSK	Verisk Analytics	Industrials	Research & Consulting Services	Jersey City, New Jersey	2015-10-08	0001442145	1971
VZ	Verizon	Communication Services	Integrated Telecommunication Services	New York City, New York	1983-11-30	0000732712	1983 (1877)
VRTX	Vertex Pharmaceuticals	Health Care	Biotechnology	Boston, Massachusetts	2013-09-23	0000875320	1989
VRT	Vertiv	Industrials	Electrical Components & Equipment	Westerville, Ohio	2026-03-23	0001674101	2016
VTRS	Viatris	Health Care	Pharmaceuticals	Pittsburgh, Pennsylvania	2004-04-23	0001792044	1961
VICI	Vici Properties	Real Estate	Hotel & Resort REITs	New York City, New York	2022-06-08	0001705696	2017
V	Visa Inc.	Financials	Transaction & Payment Processing Services	San Francisco, California	2009-12-21	0001403161	1958
VST	Vistra Corp.	Utilities	Electric Utilities	Irving, Texas	2024-05-08	0001692819	2016
VMRK	Vivmark Residential	Real Estate	Multi-Family Residential REITs	Chicago, Illinois	2001-12-03	0000906107	1969
VMC	Vulcan Materials Company	Materials	Construction Materials	Birmingham, Alabama	1999-06-30	0001396009	1909
VYLR	Vylor	Consumer Staples	Agricultural Products & Services	Johnston, Iowa	2026-10-01	0002128626	2026
WRB	W. R. Berkley Corporation	Financials	Property & Casualty Insurance	Greenwich, Connecticut	2019-12-05	0000011544	1967
GWW	W. W. Grainger	Industrials	Industrial Machinery & Supplies & Components	Lake Forest, Illinois	1981-06-30	0000277135	1927
WAB	Wabtec	Industrials	Construction Machinery & Heavy Transportation Equipment	Pittsburgh, Pennsylvania	2019-02-27	0000943452	1999 (1869)
WMT	Walmart	Consumer Staples	Consumer Staples Merchandise Retail	Bentonville, Arkansas	1982-08-31	0000104169	1962
DIS	Walt Disney Company (The)	Communication Services	Movies & Entertainment	Burbank, California	1976-06-30	0001744489	1923
WM	Waste Management	Industrials	Environmental & Facilities Services	Houston, Texas	1998-08-31	0000823768	1968
WAT	Waters Corporation	Health Care	Life Sciences Tools & Services	Milford, Massachusetts	2002-01-02	0001000697	1958
WEC	WEC Energy Group	Utilities	Electric Utilities	Milwaukee, Wisconsin	2008-10-31	0000783325	1896
WFC	Wells Fargo	Financials	Diversified Banks	San Francisco, California	1976-06-30	0000072971	1852
WELL	Welltower	Real Estate	Health Care REITs	Toledo, Ohio	2009-01-30	0000766704	1970
WST	West Pharmaceutical Services	Health Care	Health Care Supplies	Exton, Pennsylvania	2020-05-22	0000105770	1923
WDC	Western Digital	Information Technology	Technology Hardware, Storage & Peripherals	San Jose, California	2009-07-01	0000106040	1970
WY	Weyerhaeuser	Real Estate	Timber REITs	Seattle, Washington	1979-10-01	0000106535	1900
WSM	Williams-Sonoma, Inc.	Consumer Discretionary	Homefurnishing Retail	San Francisco, California	2025-03-24	0000719955	1956
WMB	Williams Companies	Energy	Oil & Gas Storage & Transportation	Tulsa, Oklahoma	1975-03-31	0000107263	1908
WTW	Willis Towers Watson	Financials	Insurance Brokers	London, United Kingdom	2016-01-05	0001140536	2016
WDAY	Workday, Inc.	Information Technology	Application Software	Pleasanton, California	2024-12-23	0001327811	2005
WYNN	Wynn Resorts	Consumer Discretionary	Casinos & Gaming	Paradise, Nevada	2008-11-14	0001174922	2002
XEL	Xcel Energy	Utilities	Multi-Utilities	Minneapolis, Minnesota	1957-03-04	0000072903	1909
XYL	Xylem Inc.	Industrials	Industrial Machinery & Supplies & Components	White Plains, New York	2011-11-01	0001524472	2011
YUM	Yum! Brands	Consumer Discretionary	Restaurants	Louisville, Kentucky	1997-10-06	0001041061	1997
ZBRA	Zebra Technologies	Information Technology	Electronic Equipment & Instruments	Lincolnshire, Illinois	2019-12-23	0000877212	1969
ZBH	Zimmer Biomet	Health Care	Health Care Equipment	Warsaw, Indiana	2001-08-07	0001136869	1927
ZTS	Zoetis	Health Care	Pharmaceuticals	Parsippany, New Jersey	2013-06-21	0001555280	1952

== See also ==
- Historical components of the S&P 500
- List of public corporations by market capitalization
- List of largest companies by revenue
- List of largest United States–based employers globally
