= SBAC =

SBAC may refer to:

- SBA Communications, a United States-based telecommunications company
- Smarter Balanced Assessment Consortium, an American K-12 Common Core testing consortium
- The Society of British Aerospace Companies, a British national trade association
