= ProBuild =

American lumber company

- Type: Private
- Industry: Building materials and retail
- Founded: 1997
- Fate: Acquired in 2015 by Builders FirstSource
- Successor: Builders FirstSource, Inc.
- Headquarters: 7595 Technology Way, 5th Floor Denver, Colorado
- Number of locations: 423+ (January 2013)
- Key people: Robert Marchbank CEO
- Products: Building materials and supplies
- Revenue: ▲$3.6 billion (2012)
- Number of employees: 9,223 (2013)

ProBuild Holdings was a privately held diversified supplier of lumber and building materials to professional builders and contractors in the United States.

== Operation ==
ProBuild was acquired by Builders FirstSource in 2015 resulting in an entity with $6.1 billion combined 2014 revenue.

== History ==
In 1997, Fidelity Capital, the business development arm of Fidelity Investments, acquired the Strober Organization, a supplier of building materials to professional builders and contractors in the Northeast. Over the next nine years, Strober acquired additional regional brands, extending its reach to the mid-Atlantic and Southeast markets.

By 2005, Strober had become one of the largest professional building materials dealers in the United States. In 2008, Fidelity Capital purchased Lanoga Corporation, which was, at the time, the nation's third-largest professional building materials dealer. Fidelity made the purchase through ProBuild Holdings, Inc., a newly created entity that included the Strober Organization. The Strober Organization was the sixth-largest professional building materials dealer in the U.S. at the time. With the purchase of Lanoga, ProBuild's 2006 resources comprised over 420 locations in 38 states with more than 14,000 employees.

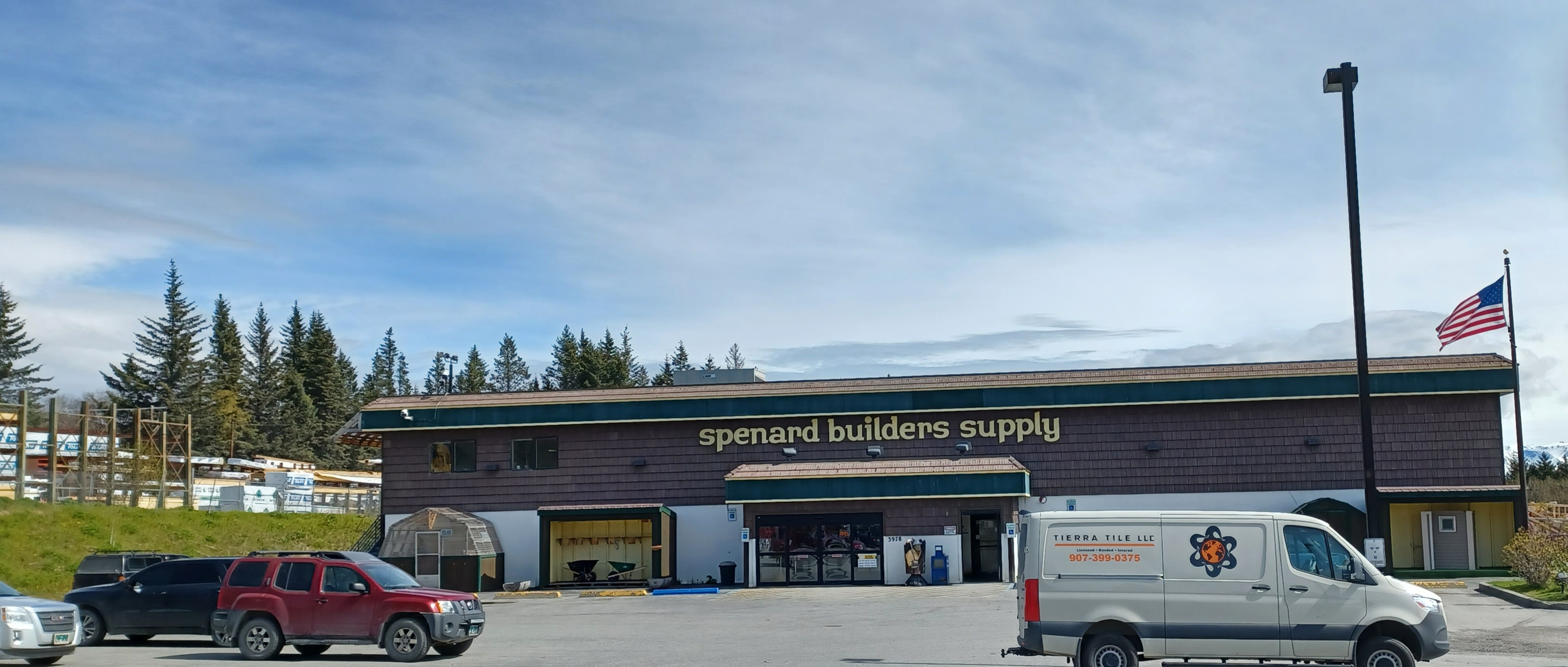
Spenard Builder's supply retail outlet, Homer

As Lanoga had purchased Spenard Builders Supply (SBS) and other builder's store in Fairbanks and Anchorage in 1978, the company's reach extended to Alaska. SPS was founded in 1952 and as of 2022, has 10 retail locations throughout Alaska and four manufacturing locations where it makes roof trusses and other milled lumber products. It continues to operate under the Spendard name.

The subsequent acquisitions of Hope Lumber and Supply and other lumber suppliers made ProBuild the largest professional building materials dealer in the United States by 2007 with more than 506 locations nationwide.

Following the downturn of the housing market in the United States in 2008, ProBuild consolidated a number of facilities and exited several markets, including Chicago and Pittsburgh. As was the case with much of the home building industry, sales fell during the downturn. ProBuild reported just over $3 billion in sales in 2009, down from at 2006 peak of $6 billion. By 2013, the company reported a nine percent increase in sales from the prior year.

On July 31, 2015, Builders FirstSource acquired ProBuild Holdings LLC, creating a more diversified company with enhanced scale and improved geographic footprint. The combined company, on a pro forma basis, generated over $6 billion in annual revenue in 2015 and currently operates approximately 400 locations in 40 states, with a market presence in 74 of the top 100 Metropolitan Statistical Areas in the United States.
