= Brighthouse Financial =

American financial services company

Brighthouse Financial, Inc.
- Company type: Public
- Traded as: Nasdaq: BHF; S&P 400 component
- ISIN: US10922N1037
- Industry: Insurance
- Founded: 2017; 9 years ago
- Headquarters: Charlotte, North Carolina, U.S.
- Key people: Chuck Chaplin (Chairman); Eric T. Steigerwalt (CEO)
- Products: Life Insurance and Annuities
- Revenue: ▼US$6.766 billion (2025)
- Number of employees: 1,500 (December 31, 2021)
- Website: brighthousefinancial.com

Brighthouse Financial, Inc. is an American insurance company, headquartered in Charlotte, North Carolina, that sells annuity and life insurance. As of March 2018, Brighthouse was one of the largest providers of annuities and life insurance in the United States, with $219 billion in total assets and around 2.6 million insurance policies and annuity contracts in-force . During the same year Brighthouse Financial along with 90 additional Fortune 500 companies "paid an effective federal tax rate of 0% or less" as a result of Donald Trump's Tax Cuts and Jobs Act of 2017.

== History ==
=== Origin ===
The company was formed in 2017 from foundations created by Travelers, which began selling life insurance in 1923 and annuities in 1938, and MetLife, which acquired New England Life Insurance Company (NELICO) in 1996 and annuity company Security First Group, Inc in 1997. In 2005, MetLife acquired Travelers Life.

=== Separation from MetLife ===
In January 2016, MetLife, Inc. announced it intended to separate a substantial portion of its U.S. retail segment of life insurance and annuities. The entities marked for separation into the new enterprise included: Brighthouse Life Insurance Company (formerly MetLife Insurance Company USA), Brighthouse Life Insurance Company of NY (formerly First MetLife Investors Insurance Company) and New England Life Insurance Company. On July 21, 2016, MetLife announced it would rebrand the business as Brighthouse Financial and on March 6, 2017, the company began selling annuity and life insurance under the Brighthouse Financial brand.

On August 4, 2017, Brighthouse Financial completed its separation from MetLife. The company began trading on the Nasdaq stock exchange on August 7, 2017, under the symbol "BHF". Upon completion of the separation, MetLife retained a 19.2% stake in the company. In 2018, MetLife divested its remaining interest through a debt-for-equity exchange with four financial institutions that owned MetLife debt. During 2018 Brighthouse Financial reported profits of more than $1.4 billion but paid an effective federal tax rate of 0% or less as a result of Donald Trump's Tax Cuts and Jobs Act of 2017.

=== Acquisition ===
In November 2025, New York-based private equity firm, Aquarian Holdings, agreed to acquired the company for $4.1 billion in an all-cash deal.

== Products ==
Brighthouse Financial sells annuity and life insurance products to U.S. consumers through multiple independent distribution channels. These products are serviced by a third-party vendor, DXC Technology, instead of directly by Brighthouse Financial.
