= Builders FirstSource =

Building materials company

Builders FirstSource, Inc.
- Type: Public
- Traded as: NYSE: BLDR; S&P 600 component
- Founded: 1998; 28 years ago
- Headquarters: Irving, Texas, U.S.
- Key people: Peter Jackson (CEO)
- Services: Building Materials; Prefabricated Components; Distribution
- Revenue: US$15.19 billion (2025)
- Operating income: US$786.3 million (2025)
- Net income: US$435.2 million (2025)
- Total assets: US$11.24 billion (2025)
- Total equity: US$4.35 billion (2025)
- Number of employees: 28,000 (2025)
- Website: bldr.com
- Footnotes; Financials as of fiscal year ended December 31, 2025

Builders FirstSource, Inc. is a publicly-traded, Fortune 500 company that manufactures and supplies building materials for the residential construction and repair and remodeling end markets. The company was founded in 1998 and is headquartered in Irving, Texas. It is the largest supplier of building products, prefabricated components and value-added services in the US. Builders FirstSource employs about 28,000 people at approximately 585 locations in 43 states.

== History ==
In 1998, private investment firm JLL Partners acquired Builders' Supply and Lumber Company from the Pulte Corporation, forming Builders FirstSource. Over the next five years the company acquired 23 companies and grew revenue to $2 billion. The company was taken public in 2005 and began trading on the NYSE.

In 2015, Builders FirstSource acquired ProBuild. This acquisition resulted in a combined entity with $6.1 billion in combined 2014 revenue and over 430 locations across 40 states. In 2018, the revenue of the combined company was $7.7 Billion.

In December 2019, Builders FirstSource acquired Raney Components, LLC and Raney Construction, Inc, located in Groveland, Florida.This business unit now operates under the name Florida Construction Services.

In January 2020, Builders FirstSource acquired Bianchi & Company, Inc, a millwork supplier and install company located in Charlotte, North Carolina, and TW Perry, a Maryland-Based Building Materials Distributor.

In August 2020, Builders FirstSource announced a merger with BMC Stock Holdings in an all-stock deal valued at approximately $2.5 billion. The merger combined two of the largest U.S. building materials distributors and created a company with more than $11 billion in annual sales, approximately 26,000 employees, and a network of about 550 distribution and manufacturing locations across more than 40 U.S. states. The deal was completed in January 2021, at which point it was announced that former BMC president and CEO Dave Flitman would be appointed CEO following a 90-day transition period. Following the closing, the combined company retained the Builders FirstSource branding. In April 2021, Flitman became CEO, succeeding Chad Crow who had served in that role from 2017 until his retirement that year.

Also in 2021, Builders FirstSource acquired the parent company of Alliance Lumber, the largest independently operated supplier of building materials in Arizona, for $400 million, and California TrusFrame, the state's largest independent truss manufacturer, for $180 million, and building products software solutions and services provider WTS Paradigm for $450 million.

In August 2021, Builders FirstSource initiated a stock buyback program. Since then, the company has repurchased 102.6 million shares of its common stock as of May 2026. That represents approximately 50% of its total shares outstanding, at an average price of $81.26 per share for a total cost of $8.3 billion, inclusive of applicable fees and taxes.

In November 2022, Dave Rush was named CEO. He served in the role until his retirement in 2024 after 25 years with the company. In November 2024, Peter Jackson succeeded Rush as the company’s CEO. Prior to being named CEO, Jackson served as Builders FirstSource’s CFO.

In 2022, Builders FirstSource acquired Trussway, a Houston-based supplier of prefabricated wood framing components, HomCo, an Arizona-based lumber and hardware supplier, and New England-based National Lumber, as well as Panel Truss and Valley Truss.

Between 2023 and 2025, Builders FirstSource acquired 21 companies, expanding the company’s offerings and customer base significantly, including Alpine Lumber with 18 locally-managed retail lumber locations across Colorado and northern New Mexico and over $500 million in sales for 2024, Noltex Truss, a North Texas truss manufacturer, Kleet Lumber, High Mountain Door & Trim, Reno Truss, Sunrise Wood Designs, Wyoming Millwork, Western Truss, components installer CRi, Pleasant Valley Homes, a Pennsylvania-based wholesale manufacturer of modular homes, O.C. Cluss Lumber & Building Supplies, St. George Truss Co., Rystin Construction, Builder’s Door & Trim, and Lengefeld Lumber.

In January 2026, Builders FirstSource acquired the assets of Premium Building Components, a N.Y.-based wall panel and truss supplier, and later that year, Glecker and Sons Building Supplies. In August of 2026, they partnered with Digs, an AI platform for homeowners and home builders. Building FirstSource is providing the Series A funding for Digs at $25.3 million.

== Products & Services ==
Builders FirstSource provides a wide range of building materials to homebuilders, contractors and professional remodelers. The company manufactures structural components including roof and floor trusses, wall panels, and pre-cut framing systems as well as windows and pre-hung doors.

Through the November 2025 acquisition of Pennsylvania-based Pleasant Valley Homes, Builders FirstSource manufacturers and sells modular homes to home builders and other wholesale customers across ten northeastern states.

In various markets, Builders FirstSource also offers turnkey installation services for categories including framing, windows and doors, siding, walls panels, trusses and more.
