= Everest Group =

American financial services company

Everest Group, Ltd.
- Formerly: Everest Re Group, Ltd.
- Type: Public
- Traded as: NYSE: EG; S&P 500 component
- ISIN: BMG3223R1088
- Industry: Insurance
- Founded: 1973; 53 years ago
- Headquarters: Delaware, US
- Key people: Jim Williamson (CEO); Joseph V. Taranto (Chairman)
- Products: Reinsurance, insurance
- Revenue: ▲US$17.5 billion (2025)
- Net income: ▲US$1.59 billion (2025)
- Total assets: ▲US$62.5 billion (2025)
- Total equity: ▲US$15.5 billion (2025)
- Number of employees: 2,428 (February 2023)
- Website: everestglobal.com

Everest Group, Ltd. is a Delaware-based provider of reinsurance and insurance, operating for close to 50 years through subsidiaries in the U.S., Europe, Singapore, Canada, Bermuda and other territories. Everest offers property, casualty, and specialty insurance and reinsurance through its various operating affiliates located in key markets around the world.

== History ==
In 1973, Everest Re Group was founded as Prudential Reinsurance, a subsidiary of Prudential Financial.

In the 1990s, Prudential Financial considered selling or spinning off Prudential Reinsurance. On October 6, 1995, Prudential Reinsurance completed an IPO. The chairman and CEO at that time was Joseph V. Taranto. Prudential Reinsurance was renamed Everest Re in 1996, after Mount Everest. In 2017, Everest Re became a S&P 500 component.

Everest Group Ltd. brandmark
