= Camden Property Trust =

Real estate investment trust

- Company type: Public company
- Traded as: NYSE: CPT; S&P 500 component
- Industry: Real estate investment trust
- Founded: 1981; 45 years ago
- Founders: Richard J. Campo; D. Keith Oden
- Headquarters: 11 Greenway Plaza; Houston, Texas, U.S.
- Key people: Richard J. Campo (Chairman & CEO); D. Keith Oden (Executive Vice Chairman); Alexander J. Jessett (CFO)
- Products: Apartments
- Revenue: ▲US$1.542 billion (2023)
- Net income: ▼US$403 million (2023)
- Total assets: ▲US$9.383 billion (2023)
- Total equity: ▼US$5.051 billion (2023)
- Number of employees: approx. 1,640 (December 2023)
- Website: camdenliving.com

Camden Property Trust is a publicly traded real estate investment trust that invests in apartments in the United States. As of December 31, 2023, the company owned interests in 176 apartment communities containing 59,800 apartment homes in the United States. It is the 14th largest owner of apartments in the United States.

The name of the company is derived from the last names of its founders, Richard J. Campo and D. Keith Oden.

== History ==
In 1981, Richard J. Campo and D. Keith Oden bought the failing Houston condominium business of their employer and reorganized it into a REIT.

In 1993, the company became a public company via an initial public offering.

In 1997, the company acquired Paragon Group, which owned 17,000 apartment units, in a $615 million transaction.

In 1998, the company acquired Oasis Residential for $542 million in stock and the assumption of $430 million in debt.

In 2005, the company acquired Summit Properties in a $1.1 billion transaction.

In 2011, the company acquired 8 properties in Texas for $261 million.

In 2012, the company purchased the 80% interest held by a joint venture partner in 12 communities for $99.5 million.

In 2016, the company sold its portfolio of properties in Nevada, which included 15 communities with 4,918 apartment units, for $630 million.

In 2022, the company acquired the remaining ownership interests in its joint venture with Teacher Retirement System of Texas.
