= Qnity Electronics =

American provider of materials for the semiconductor and electronics industries

Qnity Electronics, Inc.
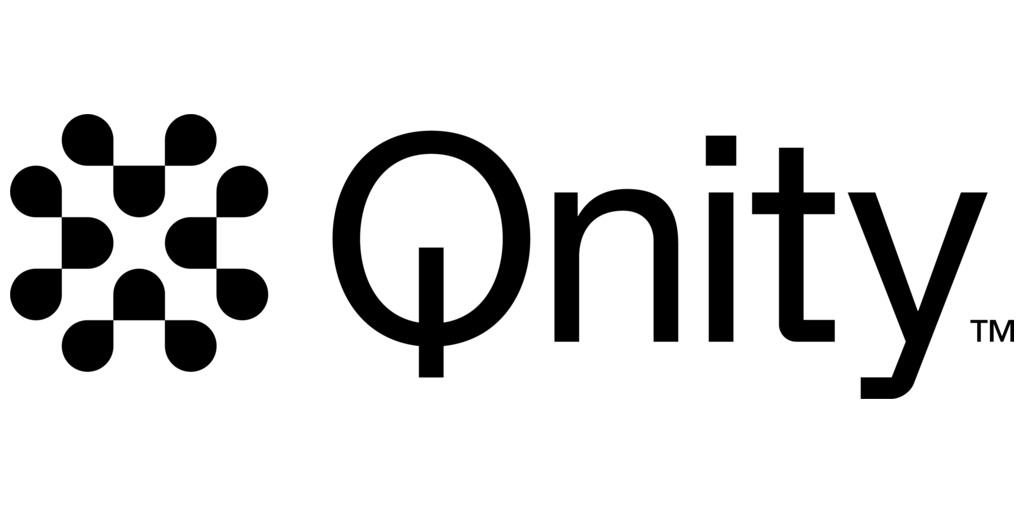
- Type: Public
- Traded as: NYSE: Q; S&P 500 component
- Industry: Semiconductors
- Founded: November 1, 2025; 10 months ago
- Headquarters: Wilmington, Delaware, U.S.
- Key people: Mark A. Blinn, Chairman; Jon D. Kemp (CEO); Michael G. Goss (CFO)
- Revenue: ▲US$4.754 billion (2025)
- Net income: ▲US$720 million (2025)
- Total assets: ▲US$14.070 billion (2025)
- Total equity: ▼US$7.366 billion (2025)
- Number of employees: 10,000 (2025)
- Website: www.qnityelectronics.com

Qnity Electronics, Inc. (kyoo-ni-tee) is a major provider of materials for the semiconductor manufacturing and electronics industries headquartered in Wilmington, Delaware. The company's Semiconductor Technologies segment (56% of 2025 revenues) produces products for chemical-mechanical polishing, photolithography, sealing applications, and OLED displays. Its Interconnect Solutions segment (44% of 2025 revenues) provides products for signal integrity, including semiconductor coatings, thermal and electromagnetic shielding, and laminate materials. Kapton is a brand of the company.

The company's customers include nearly all of the 20 largest semiconductor manufacturers worldwide. Its largest customers are Samsung Electronics (11% of 2025 revenues) and TSMC (8% of 2025 revenues).

The company operates 39 manufacturing sites including 22 in the Asia-Pacific, 19 in the Americas, and 2 in EMEA.

== History ==
The company was formed in December 2024 to own the electronics division of DuPont. In November 2025, DuPont completed the corporate spin-off of the company. The name "Qnity" was devised by Lippincott to include the letter "Q", the emblem of the power icon on electronics devices, as well as the word "unity". DuPont had expanded heavily into electronics in 1987. It acquired Laird Performance Materials for $2.3 billion in July 2021.

In March 2026, the company partnered with Nvidia to engage in research and development of materials for semiconductors and packaging technology for artificial intelligence and high-performance computing. Also in March 2026, the company was added to the domestic supply chain of Apple Inc. The company also announced a $61.5 million investment in Taiwan by acquiring the N9 plant in Zhunan, Miaoli County, from Ennostar.
