= Bio-Techne =

American life sciences company

Bio-Techne Corporation
- Formerly: Research and Diagnostic Systems, Inc. (1976–1985); Techne Corporation (1985–2014)
- Type: Public
- Traded as: Nasdaq: TECH; S&P 500 component
- Industry: Biotechnology
- Founded: 1976; 50 years ago
- Founder: Roger C. Lucas
- Headquarters: Minneapolis, Minnesota, U.S.
- Key people: Kim Kelderman (CEO); James Hippel (CFO); Robert V. Baumgartner (Chairman)
- Products: Proteins; Reagents; Diagnostic instruments
- Revenue: ▲US$1.22 billion (2025)
- Operating income: ▼US$102 million (2025)
- Net income: ▼US$73.4 million (2025)
- Total assets: ▼US$2.56 billion (2025)
- Total equity: ▼US$1.92 billion (2025)
- Number of employees: 3,100 (2025)
- Website: www.bio-techne.com

Bio-Techne Corporation is an American life sciences company that develops, manufactures and sells life science reagents, instruments and services for the research, diagnostic, and bioprocessing markets.

== History ==
The company was founded in 1976 by Roger C. Lucas as Research and Diagnostic Systems, Inc. In 1985, it merged into Techne Corporation and became a public company.

In March 2013, Charles (Chuck) Kummeth was named chief executive officer of the company.

In July 2013, the company acquired Bionostics for $104 million.

In February 2014, the company changed its name to Bio-Techne.

In April 2014, the company agreed to acquire Shanghai PrimeGene Bio-Tech Company (PrimeGene).

In July 2014, the company acquired Novus Biologicals for $60 million.

In August 2014, the company acquired ProteinSimple for $300 million.

In November 2014, the company agreed to acquire CyVek for $60 million plus up to an additional $135 million in earn-out payments.

In June 2015, the company agreed to acquire Cliniqa Corporation.

In March 2016, the company acquired Zephyrus Biosciences.

In July 2016, the company acquired Space Import-Export.

In August 2016, company acquired Advanced Cell Diagnostics for $250 million plus an additional $75 million in possible milestone payments.

In September 2017, the company acquired Trevigen.

In January 2018, the company acquired Atlanta Biologicals.

In June 2018, the company agreed to acquire Quad Technologies.

In August 2018, the company acquired Exosome Diagnostics for $250 million plus up to an additional $325 million in milestone payments.

In June 2019, the company acquired B-Mogen.

In April 2021, the company acquired Asuragen for $215 million plus up to an additional $105 million in milestone payments.

In June 2022, the business announced it would acquire Namocell Inc.

In June 2023, Bio-Techne announced it would acquire Lunaphore Technologies SA, the transaction was completed the following month.
