= Historical components of the S&P 400 =

History of components of the S&P 400

S&P Dow Jones Indices updates the components of stock market indices periodically, typically in response to acquisitions, corporate spin-offs, or upon quarterly rebalancing. The following is a list of historical changes to the components of the S&P 400:

Date	Added		Removed		Reason	Refs
Date	Ticker	Security	Ticker	Security	Reason	Refs
August 20, 2026	SUI	Sun Communities	WBS	Webster Financial	Banco Santander is acquiring Webster Financial.	
July 24, 2026	KRYS	Krystal Biotech	TMHC	Taylor Morrison	Berkshire Hathaway acquired Taylor Morrison Home.	
July 22, 2026	MOH	Molina Healthcare	NSA	National Storage Affiliates Trust	Public Storage acquired National Storage Affiliates Trust.	
July 17, 2026	BTSG	BrightSpring Health Services	GTLS	Chart Industries	Baker Hughes acquired Chart Industries.	
July 6, 2026	ALSN	Allison Transmission	GT	Goodyear Tire & Rubber	Market capitalization changes.	
July 1, 2026	TOST	Toast, Inc.	BLD	TopBuild	QXO acquired TopBuild	
July 1, 2026	IESC	IES Holdings	JHG	Janus Henderson	Janus Henderson was acquired by Trian Fund Management, L.P., General Catalyst Group Management, LLC, and Qatar Investment Authority.	
June 22, 2026	ROKU	Roku, Inc.	FLEX	Flex Ltd.	Market capitalization changes.	
June 22, 2026	CDE	Coeur Mining	BRBR	BellRing Brands	Market capitalization changes.	
June 22, 2026	SMTC	Semtech	COTY	Coty	Market capitalization changes.	
June 22, 2026	SANM	Sanmina Corporation	CNXC	Concentrix	Market capitalization changes.	
June 22, 2026	VIAV	Viavi Solutions	BLKB	Blackbaud	Market capitalization changes.	
June 11, 2026	SIRI	SiriusXM	MASI	Masimo	Danaher Corporation acquired Masimo.	
May 18, 2026	SN	SharkNinja	FLO	Flowers Foods	Market capitalization changes.	
April 9, 2026	DOCN	DigitalOcean	CASY	Casey's	Market capitalization changes.	
March 23, 2026	SOLS	Solstice Advanced Materials	LITE	Lumentum	Market capitalization changes.	
March 23, 2026	SITM	SiTime	COHR	Coherent Corp.	Market capitalization changes.	
March 23, 2026	MOG.A	Moog Inc.	SATS	EchoStar	Market capitalization changes.	
March 23, 2026	IDCC	InterDigital	GTM	ZoomInfo	Market capitalization changes.	
March 23, 2026	VICR	Vicor Corporation	ASGN	ASGN Inc.	Market capitalization changes.	
March 23, 2026	CTRE	CareTrust REIT	KMPR	Kemper Corporation	Market capitalization changes.	
February 9, 2026	ARWR	Arrowhead Pharmaceuticals	CIEN	Ciena	Market capitalization changes.	
February 2, 2026	BROS	Dutch Bros Coffee	PCH	PotlatchDeltic	Rayonier acquired PotlatchDeltic.	
February 2, 2026	AEIS	Advanced Energy	CMA	Comerica	Fifth Third Bank acquired Comerica.	
February 2, 2026	AHR	American Healthcare REIT	CADE	Cadence Bank	Huntington Bancshares acquired Cadence Bank.	
January 30, 2026	TTMI	TTM Technologies	CIVI	Civitas Resources	S&P SM Energy acquired Civitas Resources.	
January 22, 2026	SARO	StandardAero	FYBR	Frontier Communications	Verizon acquired Frontier Communications.	
January 2, 2026	PATH	UiPath	SNV	Synovus	Pinnacle Financial Partners acquired Synovus.	
December 22, 2025	ULS	UL Solutions	FIX	Comfort Systems USA	Market capitalization changes.	
December 22, 2025	PINS	Pinterest	UAA/UA	Under Armour	Market capitalization changes.	
December 22, 2025	BAH	Booz Allen Hamilton	POWI	Power Integrations	Market capitalization changes.	
December 22, 2025	SPXC	SPX Technologies	PRGO	Perrigo	Market capitalization changes.	
December 22, 2025	DY	Dycom Industries	IRDM	Iridium Communications	Market capitalization changes.	
December 22, 2025	BWA	BorgWarner	VAC	Marriott Vacations Worldwide	Market capitalization changes.	
December 22, 2025	HL	Hecla Mining	NSP	Insperity	Market capitalization changes.	
December 17, 2025	CRBG	Corebridge Financial	ALE	Allete, Inc.	Canada Pension Plan Investment Board and Global Infrastructure Partners acquired Allete.	
November 13, 2025	STRL	Sterling Infrastructure	LNW	Light & Wonder	Light & Wonder delisted from the NASDAQ Stock Exchange but kept its primary listing exclusively in Australia.	
October 6, 2025	BSY	Bentley Systems	WU	Western Union	Market capitalization changes.	
September 22, 2025	KTOS	Kratos Defense & Security Solutions	MAN	ManpowerGroup	Market capitalization changes.	
September 22, 2025	MP	MP Materials	ACHC	Acadia Healthcare	Market capitalization changes.	
September 22, 2025	TRU	TransUnion	WEN	Wendy's	Market capitalization changes.	
September 22, 2025	NTNX	Nutanix	EME	Emcor	Market capitalization changes.	
September 12, 2025	FTI	TechnipFMC	SKX	Skechers	3G Capital acquired Skechers USA.	
September 2, 2025	ELAN	Elanco	SRPT	Sarepta Therapeutics	Market capitalization changes.	
August 28, 2025	TLN	Talen Energy	IBKR	Interactive Brokers	Market capitalization changes.	
August 19, 2025	TWLO	Twilio	AMED	Amedisys	UnitedHealth Group acquired Amedisys.	
July 18, 2025	AVAV	AeroVironment	CHX	ChampionX	Schlumberger acquired ChampionX.	
June 24, 2025	APG	APi Group	X	U.S. Steel	Nippon Steel acquired United States Steel.	
May 22, 2025	PEGA	Pegasystems	JWN	Nordstrom	The Nordstrom family and El Puerto de Liverpool acquired Nordstrom.	
May 1, 2025	OKTA	Okta, Inc.	BERY	Berry Global	Amcor acquired Berry Global Group.	
March 31, 2025	CAVA	Cava Group	ALTR	Altair Engineering	Siemens AG acquired Altair Engineering.	
March 24, 2025	VFC	VF Corporation	TKO	TKO Group Holdings	Market capitalization changes.	
March 24, 2025	ALK	Alaska Air Group	WSM	Williams-Sonoma, Inc.	Market capitalization changes.	
March 24, 2025	HIMS	Hims & Hers Health	EXE	Expand Energy	Market capitalization changes.	
March 24, 2025	BBWI	Bath & Body Works, Inc.	CC	Chemours	Market capitalization changes.	
March 24, 2025	ATI	Allegheny Technologies	TDC	Teradata	Market capitalization changes.	
March 24, 2025	SATS	EchoStar	NEOG	Neogen	Market capitalization changes.	
March 11, 2025	ACI	Albertsons	AZPN	Aspen Technology	Emerson Electric acquired Aspen Technology.	
March 6, 2025	ENTG	Entegris	ALTM	Arcadium Lithium	Rio Tinto acquired Arcadium Lithium.	
January 27, 2025	GWRE	Guidewire Software	ARWR	Arrowhead Pharmaceuticals	Market capitalization changes.	
January 14, 2025	CART	Maplebear Inc.	ENOV	Enovis	Market capitalization changes.	
December 23, 2024	CMA	Comerica	VSH	Vishay Intertechnology	Market capitalization changes.	
December 23, 2024	CRS	Carpenter Technology Corporation	CRI	Carter's	Market capitalization changes.	
December 23, 2024	BILL	Bill.com	LII	Lennox International	Market capitalization changes.	
November 26, 2024	MLI	Mueller Industries	TPL	Texas Pacific Land Corporation	Market capitalization changes.	
November 25, 2024	FLEX	Flex Ltd.	AZTA	Azenta	Market capitalization changes.	
November 20, 2024	FOUR	Shift4	RCM	R1 RCM	TowerBrook Capital Partners and Clayton, Dubilier & Rice acquired R1 RCM.	
November 6, 2024	CHWY	Chewy	SRCL	Stericycle	Waste Management, Inc. acquired Stericycle.	
October 11, 2024	DOCU	Docusign	MDU	MDU Resources	Market capitalization changes.	
October 1, 2024	ENSG	Ensign Group	SWN	Southwestern Energy	Chesapeake Energy acquired Southwestern Energy. The combined company was renamed Expand Energy Corporation.	
September 23, 2024	BIO	Bio-Rad Laboratories	ERIE	Erie Indemnity	Market capitalization changes.	
September 23, 2024	CNH	CNH Industrial	MP	MP Materials	Market capitalization changes.	
September 23, 2024	WAL	Western Alliance Bancorporation	PGNY	Progyny	Market capitalization changes.	
September 23, 2024	PSN	Parsons Corporation	ADNT	Adient	Market capitalization changes.	
September 23, 2024	HLNE	Hamilton Lane	WOLF	Wolfspeed	Market capitalization changes.	
September 23, 2024	VNOM	Viper Energy	HELE	Helen of Troy Limited	Market capitalization changes.	
September 23, 2024	FN	Fabrinet	ZD	Ziff Davis	Market capitalization changes.	
September 23, 2024	AAL	American Airlines Group	TGNA	Tegna Inc.	Market capitalization changes.	
July 26, 2024	AVTR	Avantor	QDEL	QuidelOrtho	Market capitalization changes.	
July 22, 2024	ANF	Abercrombie & Fitch	ETRN	Equitrans Midstream	EQT Corporation acquired Equitrans Midstream.	
June 28, 2024	RYAN	Ryan Specialty	AIRC	Apartment Income REIT	Blackstone Inc. acquired Apartment Income REIT.	
June 24, 2024	TPL	Texas Pacific Land Corporation	WERN	Werner Enterprises	Market capitalization changes.	
June 24, 2024	BMRN	BioMarin Pharmaceutical	IART	Integra LifeSciences	Market capitalization changes.	
June 24, 2024	WMG	Warner Music Group	PENN	Penn Entertainment	Market capitalization changes.	
June 24, 2024	NXT	Nextracker	GO	Grocery Outlet	Market capitalization changes.	
June 24, 2024	ALTR	Altair Engineering	LEG	Leggett & Platt	Market capitalization changes.	
June 24, 2024	RBA	RB Global	HTZ	Hertz	Market capitalization changes.	
June 24, 2024	ILMN	Illumina, Inc.	GDDY	GoDaddy	Market capitalization changes.	
June 3, 2024	SRPT	Sarepta Therapeutics	SWAV	Shockwave Medical	Johnson & Johnson acquired Shockwave Medical.	
May 3, 2024	AAON	AAON	VST	Vistra	Market capitalization changes.	
April 22, 2024	DUOL	Duolingo	CABO	Cable One	Market capitalization changes.	
April 3, 2024	XRAY	Dentsply Sirona	FOXF	Fox Factory	Market capitalization changes.	
April 1, 2024	ROIV	Roivant Sciences	RUN	Sunrun	Market capitalization changes.	
April 1, 2024	APPF	AppFolio	NARI	Inari Medical	Market capitalization changes.	
March 18, 2024	WHR	Whirlpool	SMCI	Supermicro	Market capitalization changes.	
March 18, 2024	ZION	Zions Bancorporation	DECK	Deckers Brands	Market capitalization changes.	
March 18, 2024	CYTK	Cytokinetics	CALX	Calix	Market capitalization changes.	
March 18, 2024	AIT	Applied Industrial Technologies	MPW	Medical Properties Trust	Market capitalization changes.	
March 1, 2024	AMH	American Homes 4 Rent	DOC	Physicians Realty Trust	Healthpeak Properties acquired Physicians Realty Trust.	
January 23, 2024	ELF	e.l.f. Beauty	SRC	Spirit Realty	Realty Income acquired Spirit Realty Capital.	
January 5, 2024	PSTG	Pure Storage	PDCO	Patterson Companies	Market capitalization changes.	
January 2, 2024	ALTM	Arcadium Lithium	VYX	NCR Voyix	Market capitalization changes.	
December 18, 2023	RMBS	Rambus	JBL	Jabil	Market capitalization changes.	
December 18, 2023	FIX	Comfort Systems USA	BLDR	Builders FirstSource	Market capitalization changes.	
December 18, 2023	HLI	Houlihan Lokey	MODG	Topgolf Callaway Brands	Market capitalization changes.	
December 18, 2023	EQH	Equitable Holdings	VSTS	Vestis	Market capitalization changes.	
November 30, 2023	CG	Carlyle Group	ICUI	ICU Medical	Market capitalization changes.	
November 30, 2023	WPC	W. P. Carey	WOR	Worthington Industries	Market capitalization changes.	
November 13, 2023	CNM	Core & Main	ACIW	ACI Worldwide	Market capitalization changes.	
November 7, 2023	BURL	Burlington Stores	ENV	Envestnet	Market capitalization changes.	
October 20, 2023	FND	Floor & Decor	VICR	Vicor	Market capitalization changes.	
October 18, 2023	ONTO	Onto Innovation	HUBB	Hubbell Incorporated	Market capitalization changes.	
October 12, 2023	H	Hyatt	NATI	National Instruments	Emerson Electric acquired National Instruments.	
October 3, 2023			KSS	Kohl's	Market capitalization changes.	
October 2, 2023	VSTS	Vestis			Aramark completed the corporate spin-off of Vestis.	
September 29, 2023	CIVI	Civitas Resources	SYNH	Syneos Health	Elliott Investment Management acquired Syneos Health.	
September 18, 2023	RBC	RBC Bearings	HE	Hawaiian Electric Industries	Market capitalization changes.	
September 18, 2023	FNF	Fidelity National Financial	FL	Foot Locker	Market capitalization changes.	
September 18, 2023	WFRD	Weatherford International	JBLU	JetBlue	Market capitalization changes.	
September 18, 2023	ST	Sensata Technologies	TRIP	Tripadvisor	Market capitalization changes.	
September 18, 2023	MTN	Vail Resorts	HIW	Highwoods Properties	Market capitalization changes.	
September 18, 2023	VST	Vistra Corp	XRX	Xerox	Market capitalization changes.	
September 18, 2023	ALLY	Ally Financial	ENR	Energizer	Market capitalization changes.	
September 18, 2023	MORN	Morningstar, Inc.	CATY	Cathay Bank	Market capitalization changes.	
September 18, 2023	GDDY	GoDaddy	SXT	Sensient Technologies	Market capitalization changes.	
September 18, 2023	GLPI	Gaming and Leisure Properties	PZZA	Papa John's	Market capitalization changes.	
September 18, 2023	PR	Permian Resources	OMCL	Omnicell	Market capitalization changes.	
August 22, 2023	DLB	Dolby	STAA	STAAR Surgical	Market capitalization changes.	
August 21, 2023	CHK	Chesapeake Energy	MRCY	Mercury Systems	Market capitalization changes.	
August 8, 2023	ERIE	Erie Indemnity	PDCE	PDC Energy	Chevron Corporation acquired PDC Energy.	
August 4, 2023	PAG	Penske Automotive	UNVR	Univar Solutions	Apollo Global Management acquired Univar Solutions.	
July 24, 2023	ELS	Equity Lifestyle Properties	LSI	Life Storage	Extra Space Storage acquired Life Storage.	
June 19, 2023	WCC	WESCO International	NAVI	Navient	Market capitalization changes.	
June 19, 2023	ZI	ZoomInfo	SITM	SiTime	Market capitalization changes.	
June 19, 2023	OVV	Ovintiv	MAC	Macerich	Market capitalization changes.	
June 19, 2023	GPK	Graphic Packaging	VSCO	Victoria's Secret	Market capitalization changes.	
June 19, 2023	DBX	Dropbox	DEI	Douglas Emmett	Market capitalization changes.	
June 19, 2023	CCK	Crown Holdings	FULT	Fulton Financial Corporation	Market capitalization changes.	
June 19, 2023	PLNT	Planet Fitness	NGVT	Ingevity	Market capitalization changes.	
June 19, 2023	BWXT	BWX Technologies	SPWR	SunPower	Market capitalization changes.	
June 19, 2023	BERY	Berry Global	WLY	John Wiley & Sons	Market capitalization changes.	
June 19, 2023	DOCS	Doximity	DAN	Dana Incorporated	Market capitalization changes.	
June 1, 2023	KNF	Knife River Corporation	BOH	Bank of Hawaii	MDU Resources Group Inc. completed the corporate spin-off of Knife River.	
May 4, 2023	STAG	STAG Industrial	AXON	Axon Enterprise	Market capitalization changes.	
April 5, 2023			PACW	PacWest Bancorp	Market capitalization changes.	
April 4, 2023	CR	Crane (new)			Crane Holdings completed the corporate spin-off of new Crane. Following the spin-off, the parent Crane Holdings Co. changed its name to Crane NXT and remained in the S&P MidCap 400.	
March 22, 2023	EXPO	Exponent	IAA	IAA, Inc.	Ritchie Bros. Auctioneers acquired IAA.	
March 20, 2023	AXTA	Axalta	SLG	SL Green Realty	Market capitalization changes.	
March 20, 2023	VAL	Valaris	FICO	Fair Isaac	Market capitalization changes.	
March 20, 2023	ALV	Autoliv	CBRL	Cracker Barrel	Market capitalization changes.	
March 20, 2023	STWD	Starwood Property Trust	VSAT	Viasat	Market capitalization changes.	
March 20, 2023	SSB	South State Bank	WAFD	WaFd, Inc.	Market capitalization changes.	
March 20, 2023	CHRD	Chord Energy	DY	Dycom Industries	Market capitalization changes.	
March 20, 2023	WMS	Advanced Drainage Systems	KMT	Kennametal	Market capitalization changes.	
March 20, 2023	HGV	Hilton Grand Vacations	JBGS	JBG Smith	Market capitalization changes.	
March 20, 2023	HTZ	Hertz	PEB	Pebblebrook Hotel Trust	Market capitalization changes.	
March 20, 2023	ARMK	Aramark	HBI	Hanesbrands	Market capitalization changes.	
March 20, 2023	USFD	US Foods	TNDM	Tandem Diabetes Care	Market capitalization changes.	
March 1, 2023	COLB	Columbia Banking System	UMPQ	Umpqua Bank	Columbia Banking System acquired Umpqua Bank.	
February 23, 2023	UFPI	UFP Industries	LHCG	LHC Group	UnitedHealth Group acquired LHC Group.	
February 6, 2023	ADC	Agree Realty	STOR	Store Capital	Store Capital was acquired by GIC and Oak Street Capital.	
January 5, 2023	VNO	Vornado Realty Trust	RXO	RXO	Market capitalization changes.	
December 22, 2022	SMCI	Supermicro	STLD	Steel Dynamics	Market capitalization changes.	
December 19, 2022	FBIN	Fortune Brands Innovations	FSLR	First Solar	Market capitalization changes.	
December 19, 2022	ALGM	Allegro Microsystems	SMTC	Semtech	Market capitalization changes.	
December 19, 2022	CUBE	CubeSmart	NUVA	NuVasive	Market capitalization changes.	
December 1, 2022	PBF	PBF Energy	NUS	Nu Skin Enterprises	Market capitalization changes.	
December 1, 2022	NXST	Nexstar Media Group	SABR	Sabre	Market capitalization changes.	
November 2, 2022			BFH	Bread Financial	Market capitalization changes.	
November 1, 2022	RXO	RXO			XPO, Inc. completed the corporate spin-off of RXO.	
October 20, 2022	AR	Antero Resources	Y	Alleghany	Berkshire Hathaway acquired Alleghany.	
October 18, 2022	WLK	Westlake	MLKN	MillerKnoll	Market capitalization changes.	
October 12, 2022	LNTH	Lantheus Holdings	TRGP	Targa Resources	Market capitalization changes.	
October 3, 2022	FYBR	Frontier Communications	HAIN	Hain Celestial Group	Market capitalization changes.	
October 3, 2022	EXLS	EXL Service	EQT	EQT Corporation	Market capitalization changes.	
September 19, 2022	PVH	PVH Corp.	HPP	Hudson Pacific Properties	Market capitalization changes.	
September 19, 2022	PENN	Penn Entertainment	MCY	Mercury General	Market capitalization changes.	
September 19, 2022	DT	Dynatrace	AEO	American Eagle Outfitters	Market capitalization changes.	
September 19, 2022	NLY	Annaly Capital Management	MTX	Minerals Technologies	Market capitalization changes.	
August 17, 2022	MTSI	MACOM Technology Solutions	SAIL	SailPoint Technologies	Thoma Bravo acquired SailPoint Technologies Holdings.	
August 10, 2022	CELH	Celsius Holdings	ACC	American Campus Communities	Blackstone Inc. acquired American Campus Communities.	
July 27, 2022	MP	MP Materials	SAFM	Sanderson Farms	Cargill and Continental Grain Co. acquired Sanderson Farms.	
July 26, 2022	NOVT	Novanta	SIX	Six Flags	Market capitalization changes.	
July 21, 2022	HTA	Healthcare Trust of America	HR	Healthcare Realty Trust	Healthcare Trust of America acquired Healthcare Realty Trust. Post-merger, Healthcare Trust of America changed its name and symbol to Healthcare Realty Trust Inc.	
July 20, 2022	COKE	Coca-Cola Consolidated	PSB	PS Business Parks	Blackstone Inc. acquired PS Business Parks.	
July 7, 2022	ORA	Ormat Technologies	CCMP	CMC Materials	Entegris acquired CMC Materials.	
July 6, 2022	SWN	Southwestern Energy	CDK	CDK Global	Brookfield Business Partners acquired CDK Global in a tender offer.	
July 5, 2022	OMCL	Omnicell	COHR	Coherent, Inc.	II-VI Inc. acquired Coherent.	
June 29, 2022	POR	Portland General Electric	APPS	Digital Turbine	Market capitalization changes.	
June 21, 2022	UA/UAA	Under Armour	TRN	Trinity Industries	Market capitalization changes.	
June 21, 2022	IPGP	IPG Photonics	YELP	Yelp	Market capitalization changes.	
June 21, 2022	SHC	Sotera Health	URBN	Urban Outfitters	Market capitalization changes.	
June 21, 2022	SWAV	Shockwave Medical	RAMP	LiveRamp	Market capitalization changes.	
May 19, 2022	IRT	IRT Living	MIME	Mimecast	Permira Holdings acquired Mimecast.	
May 3, 2022	NARI	Inari Medical	TPH	Tri Pointe Homes	Market capitalization changes.	
April 6, 2022			PRG	PROG Holdings	Market capitalization changes.	
April 5, 2022	ESAB	ESAB			Colfax completed the corporate spin-off of ESAB.	
April 4, 2022	MTDR	Matador Resources	CPT	Camden	Market capitalization changes.	
March 30, 2022	GTLS	Chart Industries	CONE	CyrusOne	Global Infrastructure Partners acquired CyrusOne.	
March 14, 2022	BRBR	BellRing Brands	CRNC	Cerence	Market capitalization changes.	
March 2, 2022	RRC	Range Resources	MOH	Molina Healthcare	Market capitalization changes.	
February 18, 2022	ONB	Old National	UE	Urban Edge Properties	Market capitalization changes.	
February 15, 2022	PDCE	PDC Energy	NDSN	Nordson	Market capitalization changes.	
February 3, 2022	GPS	Gap	JACK	Jack in the Box	Market capitalization changes.	
February 1, 2022	EEFT	Euronet Worldwide	CMP	Compass Minerals	Market capitalization changes.	
February 1, 2022	WTS	Watts Water Technologies	STL	Sterling Bancorp	Webster Bank acquired Sterling Bancorp.	
January 4, 2022	CALX	Calix	CIT	CIT Group	First Citizens BancShares acquired CIT Group.	
December 28, 2021	VOYA	Voya Financial	COR	CoreSite	American Tower acquired CoreSite Realty.	
December 20, 2021	AA	Alcoa	HRC	Hillrom	Baxter International acquired Hill-Rom.	
December 20, 2021	LEG	Leggett & Platt	SBNY	Signature Bank	Market capitalization changes.	
December 20, 2021	HBI	Hanesbrands	SEDG	SolarEdge	Market capitalization changes.	
December 20, 2021	WU	Western Union	FDS	FactSet	Market capitalization changes.	
December 20, 2021	M	Macy's	TR	Tootsie Roll	Market capitalization changes.	
December 20, 2021	VICR	Vicor	TDS	Telephone and Data Systems	Market capitalization changes.	
December 20, 2021	POWI	Power Integrations	NKTR	Nektar Therapeutics	Market capitalization changes.	
December 2, 2021	BRKR	Bruker	KAR	KAR Auction Services	Market capitalization changes.	
November 30, 2021	SITM	SiTime	EBS	Emergent BioSolutions	Market capitalization changes.	
November 5, 2021	KD	Kyndryl	NTCT	NetScout Systems	IBM completed the corporate spin-off of Kyndryl Holdings.	
October 22, 2021	KRG	Kite Realty Group Trust	TREE	LendingTree	Market capitalization changes.	
October 5, 2021	SPWR	SunPower	XEC	Cimarex Energy	Cabot Oil & Gas acquired Cimarex Energy.	
September 20, 2021	UNM	Unum	CDAY	Ceridian	Market capitalization changes.	
September 20, 2021	NOV	NOV Inc.	BRO	Brown & Brown	Market capitalization changes.	
September 20, 2021	PRGO	Perrigo	WW	WW International	Market capitalization changes.	
September 20, 2021	TNDM	Tandem Diabetes Care	HCSG	Healthcare Services Group	Market capitalization changes.	
September 7, 2021	APPS	Digital Turbine	LGND	Ligand Pharmaceuticals	Market capitalization changes.	
September 3, 2021	PFGC	Performance Food Group	THS	TreeHouse Foods	Market capitalization changes.	
August 30, 2021	SAIA	Saia	TECH	Bio-Techne	Market capitalization changes.	
August 30, 2021	MIME	Mimecast	CNK	Cinemark Holdings	Market capitalization changes.	
August 30, 2021	OPCH	Option Care Health	TRMK	Trustmark Corporation	Market capitalization changes.	
August 4, 2021	VSCO	Victoria's Secret	INT	World Fuel Services	L Brands completed the corporate spin-off of Victoria's Secret.	
August 4, 2021	GME	GameStop	WRI	Weingarten Realty	Kimco Realty acquired Weingarten Realty.	
August 3, 2021			STRA	Strategic Education, Inc.	Market capitalization changes.	
August 2, 2021	GXO	GXO Logistics			Spun off from XPO, Inc.	
July 7, 2021	CRNC	Cerence	ATGE	Adtalem Global Education	Market capitalization changes.	
July 2, 2021	DTM	DT Midstream	PRAH	PRA Health Sciences	ICON plc acquired PRA Health Sciences.	
June 15, 2021	ELY	Callaway Golf	GRUB	Grubhub	Just Eat Takeaway.com NV acquired GrubHub.	
June 9, 2021	TRGP	Targa Resources	CLGX	CoreLogic	Stone Point Capital and Insight Partners acquired CoreLogic.	
June 9, 2021	ENV	Envestnet	TCF	TCF Financial Corporation	Huntington Bancshares acquired TCF Financial Corporation.	
June 4, 2021	HFC	HollyFrontier	SVC	Service Properties Trust	Market capitalization changes.	
June 2, 2021	CROX	Crocs	CMD	Cantel Medical Corporation	STERIS plc acquired Cantel Medical.	
May 17, 2021	AZPN	Aspen Technology	AVNS	Avanos Medical	Market capitalization changes.	
May 14, 2021	NSA	National Storage Affiliates Trust	CRL	Charles River Laboratories	Charles River Laboratories replaced FLIR Systems in the S&P 500.	
May 7, 2021	RCM	R1 RCM	PRSP	Perspecta Inc.	Veritas Capital acquired Perspecta.	
May 3, 2021	G	Genpact	GNW	Genworth Financial	Market capitalization changes.	
April 20, 2021	LSCC	Lattice Semiconductor	PTC	PTC Inc.	PTC replaced Varian Medical Systems in the S&P 500.	
April 20, 2021	PGNY	Progyny Inc.	UFS	Domtar	Market capitalization changes.	
April 12, 2021	NVST	Envista Holdings	IDCC	InterDigital	Market capitalization changes.	
March 30, 2021	NBIX	Neurocrine Biosciences	OI	O-I Glass	Market capitalization changes.	
March 22, 2021	FLS	Flowserve	EPC	Edgewell Personal Care	Market capitalization changes.	
March 22, 2021	SLG	SL Green Realty	PENN	Penn National Gaming	Market capitalization changes.	
March 22, 2021	XRX	Xerox	GNRC	Generac Holdings	Market capitalization changes.	
March 22, 2021	VNT	Vontier	CZR	Caesars Entertainment	Market capitalization changes.	
March 1, 2021	CLF	Cleveland-Cliffs	EV	Eaton Vance	Morgan Stanley acquired Eaton Vance.	
February 16, 2021	AMKR	Amkor Technology	HNI	HNI Corporation	Market capitalization changes.	
February 12, 2021	IRDM	Iridium Communications	MPWR	Monolithic Power Systems	Monolithic Power Systems replaced TechnipFMC in the S&P 500.	
January 29, 2021	STAA	STAAR Surgical	PBH	Prestige Brands	Market capitalization changes.	
January 21, 2021	YETI	Yeti Holdings	TRMB	Trimble Inc.	Trimble Inc. replaced Concho Resources in the S&P 500.	
January 7, 2021	CPRI	Capri Holdings	ENPH	Enphase Energy	Market capitalization changes.	
January 7, 2021	BRKS	Brooks Automation	WPX	WPX Energy	Devon Energy acquired WPX Energy.	
December 29, 2020	KNSL	Kinsale Capital	TCO	Taubman Centers	Simon Property Group acquired Taubman Centers.	
December 21, 2020	AIRC	Apartment Income REIT	DNKN	Dunkin' Brands	Inspire Brands acquired Dunkin' Brands Group.	
December 2, 2020			AMCX	AMC Networks	Market capitalization changes.	
December 1, 2020	CNXC	Concentrix			SYNNEX completed the corporate spin-off of Concentrix.	
November 13, 2020	MTG	MGIC Investment Corporation	GEO	GEO Group	Market capitalization changes.	
November 13, 2020	HALO	Halozyme	MD	Mednax	Market capitalization changes.	
October 7, 2020	NEOG	Neogen	POOL	Pool Corporation	Market capitalization changes.	
October 7, 2020	SSD	Simpson Manufacturing	DLPH	Delphi Technologies	BorgWarner acquired Delphi Technologies.	
October 5, 2020	SAIL	SailPoint Technologies	SBH	Sally Beauty Holdings	Market capitalization changes.	
September 21, 2020	HRB	H&R Block	ETSY	Etsy	Market capitalization changes.	
September 21, 2020	COTY	Coty	TER	Teradyne	Market capitalization changes.	
September 21, 2020	KSS	Kohl's	CTLT	Catalent	Market capitalization changes.	
September 21, 2020	JAZZ	Jazz Pharmaceuticals	RIG	Transocean	Market capitalization changes.	
September 21, 2020	WING	Wingstop	PBF	PBF Energy	Market capitalization changes.	
September 21, 2020	MEDP	Medpace	ATI	Allegheny Technologies	Market capitalization changes.	
September 21, 2020	FOXF	Fox Factory	CLI	Mack-Cali Realty	Market capitalization changes.	
September 1, 2020	LAD	Lithia Motors	LOGM	LogMeIn	Francisco Partners and Elliott Management acquired LogMeIn.	
August 17, 2020	BLDR	Builders FirstSource	CXW	CoreCivic	Market capitalization changes.	
August 3, 2020	RUN	Sunrun	LM	Legg Mason	Franklin Resources acquired Legg Mason.	
August 3, 2020	IAA	IAA	DLX	Deluxe Corporation	Market capitalization changes.	
August 3, 2020	REXR	Rexford Industrial Realty	CRS	Carpenter Technology	Market capitalization changes.	
July 24, 2020	EBS	Emergent BioSolutions	CZR	Caesars Entertainment	Eldorado Resorts acquired Caesars Entertainment.	
June 30, 2020	BLD	TopBuild	TECD	Tech Data	Apollo Global Management acquired Tech Data.	
June 25, 2020	GO	Grocery Outlet	EAT	Brinker International	Market capitalization changes.	
June 22, 2020	ADS	Alliance Data Systems	TDY	Teledyne Technologies	Market capitalization changes.	
June 22, 2020	JWN	Nordstrom	BIO	Bio-Rad Laboratories	Market capitalization changes.	
June 22, 2020	HOG	Harley-Davidson	TYL	Tyler Technologies	Market capitalization changes.	
June 22, 2020	MIDD	Middleby Corporation	DDS	Dillard's	Market capitalization changes.	
June 22, 2020	QDEL	Quidel Corp	DNOW	DNOW	Market capitalization changes.	
June 22, 2020	HXL	Hexcel	CAKE	Cheesecake Factory	Market capitalization changes.	
June 22, 2020	UNVR	Univar Solutions	REZI	Resideo Technologies	Market capitalization changes.	
June 22, 2020	STRA	Strategic Education, Inc.	BBBY	Bed Bath & Beyond Inc.	Market capitalization changes.	
June 22, 2020	QLYS	Qualys Inc	MTDR	Matador Resources	Market capitalization changes.	
June 22, 2020	GBCI	Glacier Bancorp	MDRX	Allscripts Healthcare Solutions	Market capitalization changes.	
May 27, 2020	HPP	Hudson Pacific Properties	DHC	Diversified Healthcare Trust	Market capitalization changes.	
May 26, 2020	ESNT	Essent Group	PTEN	Patterson-UTI Energy	Market capitalization changes.	
May 18, 2020	DOC	Physicians Realty Trust	WST	West Pharmaceutical Services	Market capitalization changes.	
May 6, 2020	STOR	Store Capital	DPZ	Domino's Pizza	Market capitalization changes.	
April 27, 2020	ENPH	Enphase Energy	CLB	Core Laboratories	Market capitalization changes.	
April 27, 2020	PCTY	Paylocity	MDP	Meredith Corp	Market capitalization changes.	
April 13, 2020	LHCG	LHC Group	CY	Cypress Semiconductor	LHC Group replaced Cypress Semiconductor.	
February 27, 2020	XEC	Cimarex Energy	CHK	Chesapeake Energy	Market capitalization changes.	
February 7, 2020	GNRC	Generac Holdings	ALEX	Alexander & Baldwin	Generac Holdings replaced Alexander & Baldwin.	
January 31, 2020	TMHC	Taylor Morrison	GDOT	Green Dot Corp	Taylor Morrison Home replaced Green Dot.	
January 29, 2020	DAR	Darling Ingredients	LPT	Liberty Property Trust	Darling Ingredients replaced Liberty Property Trust.	
January 21, 2020	CIT	CIT Group	SKT	Tanger Factory Outlet Centers	CIT Group replaced Tanger Factory Outlet Centers.	
December 26, 2019	RH	RH	GWR	Genesee & Wyoming	Market capitalization changes.	
December 17, 2019	COLM	Columbia Sportswear	UNIT	Uniti Group	Market capitalization changes.	
December 13, 2019	AMG	Affiliated Managers Group	LYV	Live Nation Entertainment	Market capitalization changes.	
December 13, 2019	TRIP	TripAdvisor	ZBRA	Zebra Technologies	Market capitalization changes.	
December 13, 2019	MAC	Macerich Co.	STE	STERIS plc	Market capitalization changes.	
December 13, 2019	LOPE	Grand Canyon Education	OAS	Oasis Petroleum	Market capitalization changes.	
December 13, 2019	LEA	Lear Corp	SWN	Southwestern Energy	Market capitalization changes.	
December 13, 2019	ARWR	Arrowhead Pharmaceuticals	GVA	Granite Construction	Market capitalization changes.	
December 10, 2019	CHH	Choice Hotels	PLT	Plantronics	Market capitalization changes.	
December 2, 2019	CCMP	Cabot Microelectronics	ODFL	Old Dominion Freight Line	Market capitalization changes.	
November 27, 2019	RLI	RLI Corp.	WRB	W.R. Berkley	Market capitalization changes.	
October 30, 2019	CDAY	Ceridian	OII	Oceaneering International	Market capitalization changes.	
October 30, 2019	BJ	BJ's Wholesale Club	CVET	Covetrus	Market capitalization changes.	
October 24, 2019	FCN	FTI Consulting	MDSO	Medidata Solutions	Dassault Systèmes SA acquired Medidata Solutions.	
October 18, 2019	SEDG	SolarEdge	ISCA	International Speedway	NASCAR Holdings acquired International Speedway.	
October 8, 2019	MRCY	Mercury Systems	VSM	Versum Materials	Merck KGaA acquired Versum Materials.	
October 3, 2019	NKTR	Nektar Therapeutics	BID	Sotheby's	Market capitalization changes.	
September 26, 2019	JEF	Jefferies Financial Group	NVR	NVR, Inc.	Market capitalization changes.	
September 26, 2019	IIVI	II-VI	CPE	Callon Petroleum	Market capitalization changes.	
September 18, 2019	PK	Park Hotels & Resorts	INGN	Inogen]	Market capitalization changes.	
September 23, 2019	SIGI	Selective Insurance	SIG	Signet Jewelers Ltd	Market capitalization changes.	
September 23, 2019	RGEN	Repligen	RRC	Range Resources Corp	Market capitalization changes.	
September 23, 2019	FCFS	FirstCash	TUP	Tupperware Brands Corp	Market capitalization changes.	
September 23, 2019	ETSY	Etsy	MIK	The Michaels Companies	Market capitalization changes.	
September 23, 2019	PPC	Pilgrim's Pride	QEP	QEP Resources	Market capitalization changes.	
September 23, 2019	KAR	KAR Auction Services	VAL	Valaris Limited	Market capitalization changes.	
September 23, 2019	AM	Antero Midstream	MDR	McDermott International	Market capitalization changes.	
September 23, 2019	OC	Owens Corning	CARS	Cars.com	Market capitalization changes.	
September 23, 2019	PEN	Penumbra, Inc.	MNK	Mallinckrodt	Market capitalization changes.	
August 9, 2019	GRUB	Grubhub	LDOS	Leidos Holdings	Market capitalization changes.	
August 9, 2019	FL	Foot Locker	IEX	IDEX Corp.	Market capitalization changes.	
August 1, 2019	TTEK	Tetra Tech	CHFC	Chemical Financial	Chemical Financial acquired TCF Financial Corporation and was renamed TCF Financial Corporation	
July 9, 2019	SRC	Spirit Realty	SM	SM Energy	Market capitalization changes.	
July 1, 2019	AAXN	Axon Enterprise	MKTX	MarketAxess	MarketAxess replaced L3 Technologies in the S&P 500.	
June 7, 2019	MAT	Mattel	BMS	Bemis Company	Amcor merged with Bemis.	
June 4, 2019	FLR	Fluor	RLGY	Realogy	Fluor has a market capitalization more representative of the mid-cap market space.	
May 7, 2019	EGP	EastGroup Properties	ULTI	Ultimate Software Group	Hellman & Friedman acquired Ultimate Software Group.	
April 11, 2019	SMTC	Semtech	ARRS	Arris International	CommScope Holding Company acquired ARRIS International.	
April 11, 2019	PSB	PS Business Parks	RDC	Rowan Companies	Ensco plc acquired Rowan.	
April 3, 2019	BHF	Brighthouse Financial	PBI	Pitney Bowes	Market capitalization changes.	
April 1, 2019	TREX	Trex Company, Inc.	IDTI	Integrated Device Technology	Renesas Electronics acquired Integrated Device Technology.	
March 22, 2019	FFIN	First Financial	MBFI	MB Financial	Fifth Third Bancorp acquired MB Financial.	
March 18, 2019	CFX	Colfax Corporation	BIG	Big Lots	Colfax replaced Big Lots in the S&P MidCap 400.	
March 18, 2019	NGVT	Ingevity	ESL	Esterline Technologies	TransDigm Group acquired Esterline Technologies.	
March 18, 2019	XPO	XPO, Inc.	DO	Diamond Offshore Drilling	Diamond Offshore Drilling replaced Maiden Holding in the S&P SmallCap 600.	
February 27, 2019	GT	Goodyear Tire & Rubber	WAB	Wabtec	Market capitalization changes.	
February 21, 2019	AMED	Amedisys	AHL	Aspen Insurance Holdings	Apollo Global Management acquired Aspen Insurance Holdings.	
February 11, 2019	CVET	Covetrus	DNB	Dun & Bradstreet Corp	Cannae Holdings acquired Dun & Bradstreet.	
February 6, 2019	BRX	Brixmor Property Group	VVC	Vectren	CenterPoint Energy acquired Vectren.	
February 4, 2019	CZR	Caesars Entertainment Corporation	DRQ	Dril-Quip	Dril-Quip replaced Essendant in the S&P SmallCap 600.	
January 18, 2019	GDOT	Green Dot Corporation	TFX	Teleflex	Teleflex replaced PG&E in the S&P 500.	
December 12, 2018	YELP	Yelp	GPOR	Gulfport Energy	Gulfport Energy replaced Oclaro in the S&P SmallCap 600.	
December 10, 2018	OLED	Universal Display Corporation	NBR	Nabors Industries	Nabors Industries replaced Sonic in the S&P SmallCap 600.	
December 3, 2018	PEB	Pebblebrook Hotel Trust	LHO	LaSalle Hotel Properties	Pebblebrook Hotel Trust acquired LaSalle Hotel Properties.	
December 3, 2018	SRCL	Stericycle	EGN	Energen	Stericycle replaced Energen in the S&P MidCap 400.	
December 3, 2018	CACI	CACI International	LW	Lamb Weston	CACI International replaced Lamb Weston Holdings in the S&P MidCap 400.	
November 14, 2018			SPN	Superior Energy Services	Superior Energy Services was removed from the S&P MidCap 400 and added to the S&P SmallCap 600.	
November 13, 2018	LGND	Ligand Pharmaceuticals	KEYS	Keysight Technologies	Keysight replaced CA Inc. in the S&P 500.	
November 13, 2018	EQT	EQT Corporation	JKHY	Jack Henry & Associates	EQT replaced Jack Henry & Associates in the S&P MidCap 400.	
November 13, 2018	ETRN	Equitrans Midstream			Equitrans Midstream Corp. was added to the S&P MidCap 400.	
November 12, 2018	MTZ	MasTec	UNFI	United Natural Foods	United Natural Foods replaced MiMedx in the S&P SmallCap 600.	
November 6, 2018	NSP	Insperity	LPNT	LifePoint Health	Insperity replaced LifePointHealth.	
October 11, 2018	ASGN	ASGN	FTNT	Fortinet	Fortinet replaced Envision Healthcare Corp. in the S&P 500.	
October 10, 2018	PENN	Penn National Gaming	CVG	Convergys	SYNNEX Corporation acquired Convergys.	
September 20, 2018	RLGY	Realogy	EDR	Education Realty Trust	Greystar Real Estate Partners acquired Education Realty Trust.	
September 18, 2018	WTW	WW International	KLXI	KLX Inc.	Boeing acquired KLX.	
September 17, 2018	HQY	HealthEquity	WCG	WellCare	WellCare Health Plans replaced XL Group in the S&P 500.	
September 4, 2018	VAC	Marriott Vacations Worldwide Corporation	ILG	ILG, Inc.	Marriott Vacations Worldwide acquired ILG.	
August 22, 2018	ADNT	Adient	DCT	DCT Industrial Trust	ProLogis acquired DCT Industrial Trust.	
August 20, 2018	ERI	Eldorado Resorts	PAY	VeriFone	Francisco Partners acquired VeriFone Systems.	
August 1, 2018	WWE	World Wrestling Entertainment	QCP	Quality Care Properties	Welltower acquired Quality Care Properties.	
July 11, 2018	VC	Visteon	WGL	WGL Holdings	AltaGas acquired WGL Holdings.	
July 2, 2018	EXEL	Exelixis	CPRT	Copart	Copart replaced Dr Pepper Snapple Group in the S&P 500.	
June 18, 2018	AYI	Acuity Brands	HFC	HollyFrontier	Market capitalization changes.	
June 18, 2018	RRC	Range Resources	BR	Broadridge Financial Solutions	Market capitalization changes.	
June 18, 2018	CHE	Chemed	ENDP	Endo International	Market capitalization changes.	
June 18, 2018	HAE	Haemonetics	CTB	Cooper Tire & Rubber Company	Market capitalization changes.	
June 11, 2018	OLLI	Ollie's Bargain Outlet	OA	Orbital ATK	Northrop Grumman acquired Orbital ATK.	
June 5, 2018	NAVI	Navient Corp.	WR	Westar Energy (renamed Evergy)	Navient had a market capitalization closer to the mid-cap market space.	
June 5, 2018	IART	Integra LifeSciences	GXP	Great Plains Energy	Westar Energy acquired Great Plains Energy which moved the combined company to the S&P 500.	
May 31, 2018	WYND	Wyndham Destinations	MSCC	Microsemi	Microchip Technology acquired Microsemi.	
May 31, 2018	PRAH	PRA Health Sciences	ABMD	Abiomed	ABIOMED replaced Wyndham Worldwide in the S&P 500.	
May 10, 2018	APY	Apergy Corp.	DDD	3D Systems	Dover Corp. completed the corporate spin-off of Apergy.	
May 10, 2018	MDR	McDermott International	DBD	Diebold Nixdorf	McDermott International merged with Chicago Bridge & Iron Company N.V.	
May 2, 2018	NVT	nVent Electric	KN	Knowles	Pentair completed the corporate spin-off of nVent Electric.	
May 1, 2018	OAS	Oasis Petroleum	WPG	Washington Prime Group	Market capitalization changes.	
April 19, 2018	FIVE	Five Below	DST	DST Systems	SS&C Technologies Holdings acquired DST Systems.	
April 4, 2018	LITE	Lumentum	MSCI	MSCI Inc	MSCI Inc. replaced CSRA Inc. in the S&P 500.	
March 26, 2018	EVR	Evercore	LNCE	Snyder's-Lance	Campbell's acquired Snyder's-Lance.	
March 19, 2018	SIG	Signet Jewelers	TTWO	Take-Two Interactive	Market capitalization changes.	
March 19, 2018	PDCO	Patterson Companies	SIVB	SVB Financial	Market capitalization changes.	
March 19, 2018	CHK	Chesapeake Energy	DF	Dean Foods	Market capitalization changes.	
March 19, 2018	CMD	Cantel Medical Corporation	AVP	Avon Products	Market capitalization changes.	
March 19, 2018	ICUI	ICU Medical	OMI	Owens & Minor	Market capitalization changes.	
March 8, 2018	TREE	LendingTree	BIVV	Bioverativ	Sanofi acquired Bioverativ.	
March 7, 2018	ALE	ALLETE	IPGP	IPG Photonics	IPG Photonics replaced Scripps Networks Interactive in the S&P 500.	
February 13, 2018	BYD	Boyd Gaming	CAA	CalAtlantic Homes	Lennar acquired CalAtlantic.	
February 5, 2018	HCSG	Healthcare Services Group	BWLD	Buffalo Wild Wings	Arby's Restaurant Group acquired Buffalo Wild Wings.	
January 3, 2018	SGMS	Scientific Games	HII	Huntington Ingalls	Huntington Ingalls Industries replaced C. R. Bard in the S&P 500.	
January 2, 2018	EHC	Encompass Health Corp.	HLS	HealthSouth	HealthSouth was renamed Encompass Health and changed to new symbol.	
January 2, 2018	IBKR	Interactive Brokers	HSNI	HSN Inc	Liberty Interactive Corp acquired HSN.	
December 6, 2017	DLPH	Delphi Technologies	FTR	Frontier Communications	Delphi Automotive plc was be renamed Aptiv plc and trade under new symbol APTV; completed the corporate spin-off of Delphi Technologies.	
November 22, 2017	MKSI	MKS Instruments	BRCD	Brocade Communications Systems	Broadcom Limited acquired Brocade Communications Systems.	
October 2, 2017	SIX	Six Flags	PRXL	PAREXEL	Pamplona Capital Management acquired PAREXEL.	
October 2, 2017	STL	Sterling Bancorp	OIS	Oil States International	Sterling Bancorp acquired Astoria Financial.	
September 26, 2017	SAFM	Sanderson Farms	CAB	Cabela's	Bass Pro Shops acquired Cabela's.	
September 18, 2017	ILG	ILG, Inc.	CDNS	Cadence Design Systems	Cadence Design Systems replaced Staples Inc. in the S&P 500.	
September 18, 2017	BCO	Brink's	WOOF	VCA Animal Hospitals	Mars Inc. acquired VCA.	
September 18, 2017	CPE	Callon Petroleum	WBMD	WebMD	Internet Brands acquired WebMD Health.	
August 17, 2017	SBRA	Sabra Health Care REIT	CCP	Care Capital Properties	Sabra Health Care REIT acquired Care Capital Properties.	
August 10, 2017	COR	CoreSite Realty	NSR	Neustar	NeuStar was acquired by a private investment group led by Golden Gate Capital.	
August 8, 2017	AN	AutoNation	FCN	FTI Consulting	Brighthouse Financial replaced AutoNation in the S&P 500.	
July 26, 2017	MNK	Mallinckrodt	RMD	ResMed	Market capitalization changes.	
July 26, 2017	MUR	Murphy Oil	PKG	Packaging Corporation of America	Market capitalization changes.	
July 26, 2017	BBBY	Bed Bath & Beyond Inc.	AOS	A.O. Smith	Market capitalization changes.	
July 12, 2017	KNX	Knight Transportation	KATE	Kate Spade & Company	Coach, Inc. acquired Kate Spade.	
July 12, 2017	CLB	Core Laboratories	PNRA	Panera Bread	JAB Holdings B.V. acquired Panera Bread.	
June 29, 2017	BLKB	Blackbaud	CST	CST Brands	Alimentation Couche-Tard acquired CST Brands.	
June 26, 2017	MDSO	Medidata Solutions	PVTB	PrivateBancorp	Canadian Imperial Bank of Commerce acquired PrivateBancorp.	
June 19, 2017	PNFP	Pinnacle Financial Partners	RE	Everest Re	Everest Re Group Ltd replaced Mead Johnson Nutrition Co. in the S&P 500.	
June 19, 2017	TDC	Teradata	ALGN	Align Technology	Market capitalization changes.	
June 19, 2017	R	Ryder	ANSS	ANSYS Inc	Market capitalization changes.	
June 2, 2017	CARS	Cars.com	TIME	Time Inc.	TEGNA completed the corporate spin-off of Cars.com.	
June 2, 2017	TGNA	Tegna, Inc.	JCP	J. C. Penney	IHS Markit replaced TEGNA in the S&P 500.	
June 2, 2017	MTDR	Matador Resources	WNR	Western Refining	Tesoro acquired Western Refining.	
June 2, 2017	HOMB	Home BancShares	VAL	Valspar	Sherwin-Williams acquired Valspar.	
May 16, 2017	VVV	Valvoline	NE	Noble Corporation	Ashland Global Holdings completed the corporate spin-off of its remaining stake in Valvoline.	
April 28, 2017	PBF	PBF Energy	WDR	Waddell & Reed	Waddell & Reed Financial replaced Stillwater Mining in the S&P SmallCap 600.	
April 19, 2017	SABR	Sabre Corporation	BEAV	B/E Aerospace	Rockwell Collins acquired B/E Aerospace.	
April 12, 2017	UBSI	United Bankshares	WWAV	WhiteWave Foods	Danone SA acquired WhiteWave Foods.	
April 6, 2017	ACHC	Acadia Healthcare	JOY	Joy Global	Komatsu Limited acquired Joy Global.	
April 5, 2017	DNB	Dun & Bradstreet	IT	Gartner	Gartner replaced The Dun & Bradstreet in the S&P 500.	
April 5, 2017	INCR	INC Research	CEB	CEB Inc.	Gartner acquired CEB.	
April 4, 2017	SWN	Southwestern Energy	CSC	Computer Sciences Corp.	Computer Sciences Corp. replaced Southwestern Energy in the S&P 500.	
April 3, 2017	WTFC	Wintrust Financial	MENT	Mentor Graphics	Siemens acquired Mentor Graphics.	
March 29, 2017	TCBI	Texas Capital Bancshares	ENH	Endurance Specialty Holdings	SOMPO Holdings acquired Endurance Specialty Holdings.	
March 29, 2017	MIK	Michaels	WETF	WisdomTree Investments	WisdomTree Investments moved to the S&P SmallCap 600.	
March 20, 2017	URBN	Urban Outfitters	AMD	Advanced Micro Devices	Market capitalization changes.	
March 20, 2017	FTR	Frontier Communications	RJF	Raymond James Financial	Market capitalization changes.	
March 20, 2017	FSLR	First Solar	ARE	Alexandria Real Estate Equities	Market capitalization changes.	
March 20, 2017	TTWO	Take-Two Interactive	FOSL	Fossil Group	Market capitalization changes.	
March 20, 2017	MASI	Masimo	DNR	Denbury Resources	Market capitalization changes.	
March 20, 2017	COHR	Coherent, Inc.	VSTO	Vista Outdoor	Market capitalization changes.	
March 16, 2017	GEO	GEO Group	SNPS	Synopsys	Synopsys replaced Harman International Industries in the S&P 500.	
March 2, 2017	ENDP	Endo International	REG	Regency Centers Corporation	Regency Centers acquired Equity One. Regency Centers replaced Endo International plc in the S&P 500.	
March 2, 2017	NUS	Nu Skin	EQY	Equity One	Equity One was acquired by Regency Centers.	
March 1, 2017	PBI	Pitney Bowes	CBOE	Cboe Holdings	CBOE acquired Bats Global Markets. Post acquisition, CBOE Holdings replaced Pitney Bowes in the S&P 500.	
March 1, 2017	CONE	CyrusOne	CLC	CLARCOR Inc.	Parker-Hannifin acquired CLARCOR.	
February 28, 2017	DDS	Dillard's	ISIL	Intersil	Renesas Electronics acquired Intersil.	
February 13, 2017	CTB	Cooper Tire & Rubber	SCOR	comScore	NASDAQ delisted comScore due to non-compliance.	
February 3, 2017	BIVV	Bioverativ	RH	Restoration Hardware	Biogen completed the corporate spin-off of Bioverativ. RH replaced Ciber in the S&P SmallCap 600.	
February 2, 2017	LOGM	LogMeIn	TGI	Triumph Group	Citrix Systems completed the corporate spin-off of GetGo, which was immediately acquired by LogMeIn.	
January 4, 2017	CC	Chemours	IDXX	IDEXX Laboratories	Abbott Laboratories acquired St. Jude Medical. IDEXX Laboratories replaced St. Jude Medical in the S&P 500.	
December 6, 2016	UMBF	UMB Financial Corporation	IM	Ingram Micro	Tianjin Tianhai Investment Company acquired Ingram Micro.	
December 6, 2016	GMED	Globus Medical	TLN	Talen Energy	Riverstone Holdings LLC acquired Talen Energy.	
December 1, 2016	OI	Owens-Illinois	MAA	Market capitalization changes.		
December 1, 2016	PZZA	Papa John's Pizza	PPS	Post Properties	Papa John's International replaced Post Properties in the S&P MidCap 400, and Wingstop replaced Papa John's International in the S&P SmallCap 600. Mid-America Apartment Communities acquired Post Properties.	
December 1, 2016	LM	Legg Mason	AMSG	AmSurg	AmSurg replaced Legg Mason in the S&P 500, and Legg Mason replaced AmSurg in the S&P MidCap 400. AmSurg acquired Envision Healthcare Holdings. Post merger, AmSurg changed its name to Envision Healthcare Corporation.	
November 28, 2016	LFUS	Littelfuse	LXK	Lexmark	Apex Technology and PAG Asia Capital acquired Lexmark International.	
November 10, 2016	LW	Lamb Weston	ASNA	Dressbarn	ConAgra Foods completed the corporate spin-off of Lamb Weston.	
November 3, 2016	HLS	HealthSouth	RAX	Rackspace	Apollo Global Management acquired Rackspace Hosting.	
November 1, 2016	QCP	Quality Care Properties	GES	Guess? Inc	HCP completed the corporate spin-off of Quality Care Properties.	
October 5, 2016	CUZ	Cousins Properties	CYH	Community Health Systems	Cousins Properties acquired Parkway Properties.	
October 3, 2016	VSM	Versum Materials	ANF	Abercrombie & Fitch	Air Products and Chemicals completed the corporate spin-off of Versum Materials. Air Products and Chemicals remained in the S&P 500 post Corporate spin-off.	
September 30, 2016	DO	Diamond Offshore Drilling	PLCM	Polycom	Siris Capital Group acquired Polycom. Coty, Inc. replaced Diamond Offshore in the S&P 500 index.	
September 27, 2016	SBH	Sally Beauty	RRD	RR Donnelley	R.R. Donnelly & Sons is spinning off certain operations and assets.	
September 22, 2016	NWE	NorthWestern Corporation	COO	The Cooper Companies	The Cooper Companies replaced Starwood Hotels & Resorts Worldwide in the S&P 500. Marriott International acquired Starwood.	
September 22, 2016	NUVA	NuVasive	FEIC	FEI Company	Thermo Fisher Scientific acquired FEI.	
September 21, 2016	CRUS	Cirrus Logic	FCS	Fairchild Semiconductor	ON Semiconductor acquired Fairchild Semiconductor.	
September 16, 2016	CAR	Avis Budget Group	STR	Questar	Dominion Resources acquired Questar.	
September 2, 2016	MPWR	Monolithic Power Systems	MTD	Mettler-Toledo	Mettler-Toledo International replaced Johnson Controls in the S&P 500. Tyco International acquired Johnson Controls.	
September 1, 2016	CHFC	Chemical Financial (later TCF Financial Corporation)	SVU	SuperValu	Chemical Financial acquired Talmer Bancorp.	
August 26, 2016	ENS	EnerSys	DWA	DreamWorks Animation	Comcast Corp acquired DreamWorks Animation.	
August 19, 2016	DY	Dycom Industries	FMER	FirstMerit	Huntington Bancshares acquired FirstMerit.	
July 29, 2016	MBFI	MB Financial	FNFG	First Niagara Bank	KeyBank acquired First Niagara Bank.	
June 30, 2016	EME	Emcor	ALB	Albemarle Corporation	Emera acquired TECO Energy.	
June 30, 2016	SWX	Southwest Gas	LNT	Alliant Energy	Southern Corporation acquired AGL Resources.	
June 24, 2016	CHDN	Churchill Downs	FBHS	Fortune Brands Home & Security	Fortune Brands Home & Security replaced Cablevision Systems in the S&P 500 index. Altice NV acquired Cablevision.	
May 31, 2016	HELE	Helen of Troy Limited	WCN	Waste Connections	Progressive Waste Solutions and Waste Connections merged to form a new company called Waste Connections, domiciled in Canada.	
May 31, 2016	BRCD	Brocade Communications Systems	MDC	MDC Holdings	Brocade Communications Systems acquired Ruckus Wireless.	
May 27, 2016	EDR	Education Realty Trust	AJG	Arthur J. Gallagher & Co.	Coca-Cola Enterprises merged with Coca-Cola Iberian Partners SA and Coca-Cola Erfrischungsgetränke AG to form a new company called Coca-Cola European Partners Plc.	
May 23, 2016	MPW	Medical Properties Trust	LKQ	LKQ Corp	LKQ replaced Airgas in the S&P 500. Air Liquide SA acquired Airgas.	
May 12, 2016	TXRH	Texas Roadhouse	ALK	Alaska Air Group	Western Digital acquired SanDisk.	
May 3, 2016	VSAT	ViaSat	AYI	Acuity Brands	Acuity Brands replaced ADT. in the S&P 500. Apollo Global Management, LLC acquired ADT.	
April 22, 2016	GME	GameStop	GPN	Global Payments Inc	Global Payments acquired Heartland Payment Systems.	
April 18, 2016	THC	Tenet Healthcare	JAH	Jarden	Newell Rubbermaid acquired Jarden. Ulta Salon, Cosmetics & Fragrance replaced Tenet Healthcare in the S&P 500.	
April 14, 2016	PBH	Prestige Brands	CNL	CLECO	Macquarie Infrastructure Partners acquired Cleco.	
April 6, 2016	RH	Restoration Hardware	ATML	Atmel	Microchip Technology acquired Atmel.	
April 4, 2016	WBMD	webMD	SUNE	SunEdison	Market capitalization changes.	
April 4, 2016	DCT	DCT Industrial Trust	FL	Foot Locker	Foot Locker replaced Cameron International in the S&P 500. Schlumberger acquired Cameron International.	
March 30, 2016	ABMD	Abiomed	HOLX	Hologic	Exelon acquired Pepco Holdings. Hologic moved to S&P 500 to replace Pepco Holdings.	
March 30, 2016	ESV	Ensco plc	CNC	Centene	Centene replaced Ensco plc in the S&P 500.	
March 30, 2016	FR	First Industrial Realty Trust	HNT	Health Net	Centene acquired Health Net.	
March 8, 2016	NJR	New Jersey Resources	SFG	StanCorp Financial	Meiji Yasuda Life Insurance Co. acquired StanCorp Financial.	
March 7, 2016	HR	Healthcare Realty Trust	UDR	UDR, Inc.	UDR Inc. replaced Keurig Green Mountain in the S&P 500. JAB Holding Company acquired Keurig Green Mountain.	
March 4, 2016	CNX	Consol Energy	SLH	Solera Holdings	Vista Equity Partners acquired Solera.	
March 1, 2016	PVTB	PrivateBancorp	SIRO	Sirona Dental Systems	Dentsply International acquired Sirona Dental Systems.	
February 25, 2016	LNCE	Snyder's-Lance	CRC	California Resources Corporation	Snyder's-Lance acquired Diamond Foods.	
February 9, 2016	FNB	FNB Corporation	RCII	Rent-A-Center	F.N.B. acquired Metro Bancorp.	
February 9, 2016	SFM	Sprouts Farmers Market	SWI	SolarWinds	Private equity firms Silver Lake Partners and Thoma Bravo LLC acquired SolarWinds.	
February 1, 2016	SCOR	comScore	CC	Chemours	comScore acquired Rentrak.	
February 1, 2016	CW	Curtiss-Wright	FRT	Federal Realty Investment Trust	Avago Technologies acquired Broadcom. Federal Realty Investment Trust replaced Broadcom in the S&P 500.	
January 27, 2016	POOL	Pool Corporation	BMR	BioMed Realty Trust	Blackstone Real Estate Partners acquired BioMed Realty Trust.	
January 19, 2016	MSCC	Microsemi	ATW	Atwood Oceanics	Microsemi acquired PMC-Sierra.	
January 19, 2016	EPR	EPR Properties	EXR	Extra Space Storage	ACE Ltd. acquired Chubb. Extra Space Storage replaced Chubb in the S&P 500.	
January 5, 2016	FOSL	Fossil Group	TW	Towers Watson	Willis Group merged with Towers Watson. The combined company replaced Fossil Group in the S&P 500.	
December 29, 2015	SNX	Synnex	CHD	Church & Dwight	Intel acquired Altera. Church & Dwight replaced Altera in the S&P 500.	
December 14, 2015	JCOM	j2 Global	CYT	Cytec Industries	Solvay S.A. acquired Cytec Industries.	
November 30, 2015	CSC	Computer Sciences Corp	APOL	Apollo Education Group	CSRA Inc. was added to the S&P 500 reflecting its spin-off from Computer Sciences. CSC was removed from the S&P 500.	
November 18, 2015	GNW	Genworth Financial	ROVI	Rovi	Synchrony Financial replaced Genworth Financial in the S&P 500.	
November 2, 2015	MKTX	MarketAxess	CYN	City National Corp	Royal Bank of Canada acquired City National.	
July 30, 2015	ENH	Endurance Specialty Holdings	TMST	Timken Company	Endurance Specialty Holdings acquired Montpelier Re Holdings.	
July 8, 2015	JACK	Jack in the Box	AAP	Advance Auto Parts	Dollar Tree acquired Family Dollar Stores. Advance Auto Parts moved to the S&P 500 to replace Family Dollar Stores.	
July 8, 2015	WST	West Pharmaceutical Services	ADVS	Advent Software	SS&C Technologies Holdings acquired Advent Software.	
July 1, 2015	ATI	Allegheny Technologies	UNT	Unit	NiSource completed the corporate spin-off of Columbia Pipeline Group. NiSource remained in the S&P 500 and Columbia Pipeline was added to the S&P 500.	
June 30, 2015	CC	Chemours	SMTC	Semtech	E. I. du Pont de Nemours and Co. completed the corporate spin-off of Chemours.	
June 30, 2015	CABO	Cable One	BTU	Peabody Energy	Graham Holdings Company completed the corporate spin-off of Cable One. Graham Holdings remained in the S&P MidCap 400 following the distribution.	
June 30, 2015	EPC	Edgewell Personal Care	HSC	Harsco	Energizer completed the corporate spin-off of "new" Energizer. Post spin, the parent company changed its name to Edgewell Personal Care Co. and trade under the symbol "EPC". It remained in the S&P MidCap 400 following the distribution.	
June 25, 2015	CASY	Casey's General Stores	AOL	AOL	Verizon acquired AOL.	
June 11, 2015	WETF	WisdomTree Investments	QRVO	Qorvo	Qorvo Inc. replaced Lorillard Inc. in the S&P 500; Lorillard was acquired by Reynolds American Inc.	
June 29, 2015	CBRL	Cracker Barrel	DRC	Dresser-Rand Group	Siemens AG acquired Dresser-Rand Group.	
June 10, 2015	MANH	Manhattan Associates	LTM	Life Time Fitness Inc.	Life Time Fitness is now a private company.	
June 1, 2015	TLN	Talen Energy	WIN	Windstream	PPL Corp completed the corporate spin-off of Talen Energy.	
May 29, 2015	OZRK	Bank of the Ozarks	XLS	Exelis	Harris acquired Exelis.	
April 27, 2015	DNKN	Dunkin' Brands	RVBD	Riverbed Technology Inc	Riverbed Technology was acquired by group led by Thoma Bravo LLC.	
April 24, 2015	CSAL	Communications Sales & Leasing	CLF	Cliffs Natural Resources	Windstream Holdings completed the corporate spin-off of Communications Sales & Leasing; Cliffs Natural Resources removed due to market cap adjustments	
April 7, 2015	CNO	CNO Financial Group	SLXP	Salix Pharmaceuticals	Salix Pharmaceuticals was acquired by Valeant Pharmaceuticals.	
December 16, 2014	KLXI	KLX	CVEO	Civeo	Corporate spin-off.	
December 9, 2014	THS	TreeHouse Foods	CNVR	Conversant	Acquisition.	
December 8, 2014	IPGP	IPG Photonics	CPWR	Compuware	Acquisition.	
December 4, 2014	BMS	Bemis	CNQR	Concur Technologies	Acquisition.	
December 4, 2014	TYL	Tyler Technologies	TIBX	TIBCO Software	Acquisition.	
November 28, 2014	CRC	California Resources Corporation	RYAM	Rayonier Advanced Materials	Acquisition.	
November 24, 2014	WNR	Western Refining	BYI	Bally Technologies	Acquisition.	
November 4, 2014	JBL	Jabil Circuit	TWTC	TW Telecom	Acquisition.	
October 31, 2014	KEYS	Keysight Technologies	UVV	Universal	Corporate spin-off.	
October 31, 2014	HYH	Halyard Health	ADTN	ADTRAN	Corporate spin-off.	
October 17, 2014	SKT	Tanger Factory Outlet Centers	URS	URS	Market capitalization changes.	
September 30, 2014	CDK	CDK Global Inc.	BBG	Bill Barrett Corporation	Bill Barrett's market capitalization is below $1.2 billion.	
September 19, 2014	GHC	Graham Holdings	URI	United Rentals	Market capitalization changes.	
September 19, 2014	BTU	Peabody Energy	UHS	Universal Health Services	Market capitalization changes.	
September 19, 2014	CGNX	Cognex	WABC	Westamerica Bancorporation	Market capitalization changes.	
September 3, 2014	CNC	Centene	MCRS	MICROS Systems	Market capitalization changes.	
August 18, 2014	RDC	Rowan	MNK	Mallinckrodt	Market capitalization changes.	
August 14, 2014	ULTI	Ultimate Software Group	HSH	Hillshire Brands	Acquisition.	
July 1, 2014	X	United States Steel	MLM	Martin Marietta Materials	Market capitalization changes.	
June 30, 2014	LHO	LaSalle Hotel Properties	AMG	Affiliated Managers Group	Corporate spin-off.	
June 30, 2014	TMST	Timken Company	GHL	Greenhill & Co.	Corporate spin-off.	
June 30, 2014	BDC	Belden	FNF	Fidelity National Financial	Corporate spin-off.	
June 27, 2014	RYAM	Rayonier Advanced Materials	IPI	Intrepid Potash	Acquisition.	
June 20, 2014	IGT	International Game Technology	XEC	Cimarex Energy	Market capitalization changes.	
June 20, 2014	LYV	Live Nation Entertainment	MASI	Masimo	Market capitalization changes.	
June 20, 2014	ARRS	ARRIS Group	BCO	The Brink's Company	Market capitalization changes.	
June 6, 2014	TIME	Time Inc.	BOBE	Bob Evans Farms	Corporate spin-off.	
May 30, 2014	DNOW	NOW	BGC	General Cable	Corporate spin-off.	
May 30, 2014	CVEO	Civeo	MATW	Matthews International	Corporate spin-off.	
May 28, 2014	WPG	Washington Prime Group	UTIW	UTi Worldwide	Corporate spin-off.	
April 30, 2014	SLM	SLM	ANR	Alpha Natural Resources	Corporate spin-off.	
April 30, 2014	POL	PolyOne	UAA	Under Armour	Corporate spin-off.	
April 17, 2014	UMPQ	Umpqua Holdings	SGMS	Scientific Games	Acquisition.	
April 1, 2014	CLF	Cleveland-Cliffs	ESS	Essex Property Trust	Acquisition.	
April 1, 2014	FEIC	FEI Company	BRE	BRE Properties	Acquisition.	
March 21, 2014	WPX	WPX Energy	GMCR	Keurig Green Mountain	Market capitalization changes.	
March 21, 2014	KATE	Kate Spade & Company	MATX	Matson	Market capitalization changes.	
February 28, 2014	KN	Knowles Corporation	AINV	Apollo Investment	Corporate spin-off.	
January 31, 2014	OGS	ONE Gas	VCI	Valassis Communications	Corporate spin-off.	
January 28, 2014	FTNT	Fortinet	HTSI	Harris Teeter	Acquisition.	
January 28, 2014	SIRO	Sirona Dental Systems	HMA	Health Management Associates	Acquisition.	
January 23, 2014	ALGN	Align Technology	TSCO	Tractor Supply	Market capitalization changes.	
January 2, 2014	RNR	RenaissanceRe	LPS	Lender Processing Services	Acquisition.	
December 23, 2013	HAIN	The Hain Celestial Group	NVE	NV Energy	Acquisition.	
December 20, 2013	TER	Teradyne	SCHL	Scholastic	Market capitalization changes.	
December 20, 2013	ANF	Abercrombie & Fitch	ADS	Alliance Data Systems	Market capitalization changes.	
December 20, 2013	JDSU	JDS Uniphase	MHK	Mohawk Industries	Market capitalization changes.	
December 20, 2013	ODFL	Old Dominion Freight Line	ACI	Arch Coal	Market capitalization changes.	
December 20, 2013	BC	Brunswick	RGS	Regis	Market capitalization changes.	
November 4, 2013	AOS	A.O. Smith	SKS	Saks	Acquisition.	
September 27, 2013	SAIC	Science Applications International	BKS	Barnes & Noble	Market capitalization changes.	
September 26, 2013	CBST	Cubist Pharmaceuticals	SFD	Smithfield Foods	Acquisition.	
September 20, 2013	AMD	Advanced Micro Devices	VRTX	Vertex Pharmaceuticals	Market capitalization changes.	
September 20, 2013	SAI	SAIC	AME	Ametek	Market capitalization changes.	
August 30, 2013	MUSA	Murphy USA	STRA	Strayer Education	Corporate spin-off.	
July 30, 2013	SLXP	Salix Pharmaceuticals	GDI	Gardner Denver	Acquisition.	
June 28, 2013	APOL	Apollo Group	FST	Forest Oil	Corporate spin-off.	
June 28, 2013	MNK	Mallinckrodt	TLAB	Tellabs	Corporate spin-off.	
June 21, 2013	FHN	First Horizon National	QLGC	QLogic	Market capitalization changes.	
May 30, 2013	DPZ	Domino's Pizza	PXP	Plains Exploration & Production	Acquisition.	
May 23, 2013	DF	Dean Foods	KSU	Kansas City Southern	Market capitalization changes.	
May 23, 2013	WWAV	WhiteWave Foods	KWK	Quicksilver Resources	Market capitalization changes.	
May 8, 2013	DDD	3D Systems	MAC	The Macerich Company	Market capitalization changes.	
May 1, 2013	CST	CST Brands	NOG	Northern Oil & Gas	Corporate spin-off.	
April 30, 2013	EXP	Eagle Materials	REGN	Regeneron Pharmaceuticals	Market capitalization changes.	
February 28, 2013	KRC	Kilroy Realty	JEF	Jefferies Group	Market capitalization changes.	
February 12, 2013	PRI	Primerica	SHAW	The Shaw Group	Acquisition.	
January 29, 2013	EXR	Extra Space Storage	RAH	Ralcorp	Market capitalization changes.	
December 31, 2012	FII	Federated Investors	ESI	ITT Educational Services	Corporate spin-off.	
December 21, 2012	UNFI	United Natural Foods	AGP	AMERIGROUP	Acquisition.	
December 11, 2012	RRD	R.R. Donnelley	MRX	Medicis Pharmaceutical	Acquisition.	
October 4, 2012	CAB	Cabela's	PETM	PetSmart	Market capitalization changes.	
October 1, 2012	ANR	Alpha Natural Resources	KFY	Korn/Ferry	Market capitalization changes.	
October 1, 2012	GWR	Genesee & Wyoming	PSS	Collective Brands	Acquisition.	
September 28, 2012	LXK	Lexmark	RSH	RadioShack	Corporate spin-off.	
September 28, 2012	DV	DeVry	PNR	Pentair	Corporate spin-off.	
August 7, 2012	JAH	Jarden	LNCR	Lincare Holdings	Acquisition.	
July 31, 2012	SWI	SolarWinds	GPRO	Gen-Probe	Acquisition.	
June 29, 2012	ALEX	Alexander & Baldwin	PCX	Patriot Coal	Corporate spin-off.	
June 28, 2012	HSH	Hillshire Brands	MNST	Monster Beverage	Corporate spin-off.	
May 15, 2012	TPX	Tempur-Pedic International	TNB	Thomas & Betts	Acquisition.	
April 30, 2012	SVU	SUPERVALU	AM	American Greetings	Market capitalization changes.	
March 26, 2012	WXS	Wright Express	SUG	Southern Union	Market capitalization changes.	
February 3, 2012	POST	Post Holdings	CRK	Comstock Resources	Market capitalization changes.	
January 13, 2012	CRI	Carter's	NDN	99¢ Only Stores	Market capitalization changes.	
