= PHLX Semiconductor Sector =

Widely used stock market index

The PHLX Semiconductor Sector (SOX) is a capitalization-weighted index comprising the 30 largest U.S.-traded companies (not necessarily U.S. companies) primarily involved in the design, distribution, manufacture, and sale of semiconductors. It was created in 1993 by the Philadelphia Stock Exchange, which is now owned by NASDAQ.

The Index contains the following components as updated on September 20, 2024:

- Advanced Micro Devices, Inc., AMD
- Allegro Microsystems, Inc., ALGM
- Amkor Technology, Inc., AMKR
- Analog Devices, Inc., ADI
- Applied Materials, Inc., AMAT
- ASML Holding N.V., ASML
- Axcelis Technologies, Inc., ACLS
- Broadcom Inc., AVGO
- Coherent Corp., COHR
- Entegris, Inc., ENTG
- GLOBALFOUNDRIES Inc., GFS
- Intel Corporation, INTC
- KLA Corporation, KLAC
- Lam Research Corporation, LRCX
- Lattice Semiconductor Corporation, LSCC
- Marvell Technology, Inc., MRVL
- Microchip Technology Incorporated, MCHP
- Micron Technology, Inc., MU
- Monolithic Power Systems, Inc., MPWR
- NVIDIA Corporation, NVDA
- NXP Semiconductors N.V., NXPI
- ON Semiconductor Corporation, ON
- Qorvo, Inc., QRVO
- QUALCOMM Incorporated, QCOM
- Rambus, Inc., RMBS
- Skyworks Solutions, Inc., SWKS
- Taiwan Semiconductor Manufacturing Company Limited, TSM
- Teradyne, Inc., TER
- Texas Instruments Incorporated, TXN
- Wolfspeed, Inc., WOLF

== History ==
The index was set to an initial value of 200 on December 1, 1993 and was split two-for-one on July 24, 1995; options commenced trading on September 7, 1994.
