= Store Capital =

U.S. Real Estate Investment Trust

Store Capital Corporation
- Company type: Private
- Traded as: NYSE: STOR (2015–2023)
- Industry: Real estate investment trust (REIT)
- Founded: 2011; 15 years ago
- Headquarters: Scottsdale, Arizona, U.S.
- Key people: Mary Fedewa (CEO)
- Services: Real Estate leases
- Revenue: ▲US$783.8 million (2021)
- Net income: ▲US$268.35 million (2021)
- Total assets: ▲US$9.7 billion (2021)
- Total equity: ▲US$5.1 billion (2021)
- Owner: GIC; Oak Street Capital
- Number of employees: 117 (2021)
- Website: storecapital.com

Store Capital Corporation (STORE stands for Single Tenant Operational Real Estate) is a private American real estate investment trust headquartered in Scottsdale, Arizona.

== History ==
The company was founded in 2011 and is based in Scottsdale, Arizona.

Backed by Oaktree Capital Management, the company filed for its initial public offering in August 2014 and went public on the New York Stock Exchange later that year. Its stock was added to the S&P 400 stock market index in 2020.

On December 28, 2021, co-founder, executive chairman of the board and former CEO, Christopher Volk, was terminated without cause, receiving cash severance and other benefits in accordance with the terms of his employment agreement. Tawn Kelley, a board member since 2020 and Vice President of Taylor Morrison Home Corporation, was given the chairman position in a non-executive capacity.

In September 2022, Singaporean sovereign wealth fund GIC and American private equity firm Oak Street, a division of Blue Owl Capital Inc., agreed to acquire Store Capital in an all-cash deal valued at about US$14 billion.

== Operations ==
STORE Capital likes to work directly with companies in sale/leaseback transactions, which account for roughly 80% of its acquisitions. The company invests primarily in high-quality properties that are subject to long-term NNN Leases. The company often leases to smaller tenants that do not have credit ratings from major credit rating agencies, and therefore requires most of its clients to disclose the profitability for operations attach individual property leased from STORE, which allows the company to independently determine the creditworthiness of its tenants and use this profitability as a source to rent.

At June 30, 2022, the company had a portfolio valued at $11.4 billion and consisting of investments in 3.012 properties operated by 579 clients in 49 American states. Its clients operate across a wide range of service, retail and manufacturing industries within the U.S. economy, including theme parks, restaurants, theaters, car wash centers, automotive parts and repair shops, pet shops, plant nurseries and furniture stores. Approximately 94% of the portfolio represents commercial real estate properties subject to long-term leases, with around 6% representing mortgage loans and financing receivables on commercial real estate properties.
