= Delphi Technologies =

Automotive Parts Manufacturer

- Industry: Automotive aftermarket
- Fate: Brand name of PHINIA
- Parent: PHINIA
- Website: delphiautoparts.com

Delphi Technologies was an independent automotive company from 2017 to 2020, when it was acquired by BorgWarner Inc. As of 5 July 2023, BorgWarner completed the spin-off of Delphi Technologies, Delco Remy, and Hartridge to a separate publicly traded company, PHINIA.

Delphi Technologies was formed in 2017 when Delphi Automotive, formerly a division of General Motors, renamed itself Aptiv and spun off its powertrain and aftermarket related businesses to a stand-alone company Delphi Technologies PLC. The $4.5 billion company began trading under the former Delphi Automotive symbol DLPH on the New York Stock Exchange. It was added to the S&P MidCap 400 Index on 6 December 2017.

The company provided combustion systems, electrification products and software and controls, and operated in the passenger car and commercial vehicle markets, and in vehicle repair through a global aftermarket network. As of 2018, the company had more than 20,000 employees including 5,000 engineers. It was headquartered in London, U.K. and operates technical centers, manufacturing sites, and customer support services in 24 countries.

Upon the formation of Delphi Technologies, Liam Butterworth, head of the former Delphi Automotive's global powertrain business since 2014, was named CEO. In October 2018, he left the company, and director and former Tenneco COO Hari Nair was named interim CEO. On 7 January 2019 Richard Dauch was named new CEO.

On 28 January 2020, BorgWarner Inc. agreed to buy Delphi Technologies in an all stock merger that valued Delphi at about $3.3 billion, Delphi stockholders would own about 16% of the combined company. By acquiring Delphi Technologies, BorgWarner Inc. has strengthened its position in power electronics. Delphi Technologies’ expertise gives BorgWarner Inc. the technical capabilities it needs to compete in combustion, hybrid, and electric vehicle markets. The deal was completed in October 2020.

On 5 July 2023, BorgWarner Inc. completed the spin-off of Delphi Technologies, Delco Remy, and Hartridge into a separate public traded company, PHINIA. So BorgWarner Inc. still own Delphi Technologies
