= Rayonier Advanced Materials =

American chemical company

RYAM
- Company type: Public
- Traded as: NYSE: RYAM
- Industry: Chemicals
- Founded: 2014
- Headquarters: Riverplace Tower; 1301 Riverplace Blvd; Suite 2300; Jacksonville, Florida
- Key people: Scott Sutton, (President & CEO)
- Products: Products list: Acetate; Cellulose; Ethers; Viscose; Soap; Turpentine
- Revenue: ▲$1.7 billion USD (2013) (prior to split)
- Net income: ▲$374 million USD (2013) (prior to split)
- Number of employees: 2500
- Website: ryam.com

Rayonier Advanced Materials recently rebranded as RYAM. RYAM is an American company recognized globally for its cellulose-based technologies. Specializing in high-purity cellulose specialties, RYAM produces natural polymers extensively used in manufacturing filters, food, pharmaceuticals, and various industrial applications. Additionally, the company produces products for the paper and packaging industries. The company is publicly traded on the New York Stock Exchange under the ticker symbol RYAM. RYAM is headquartered in Jacksonville, Florida, with manufacturing operations in the U.S., Canada, and France. The company was formed in 2014 when Rayonier, Inc. divided into two separate entities: Rayonier retained its real estate and forest resource operations, while RYAM took over the management of the performance fibers division.

== History ==
=== 20th century ===
Rayonier Advanced Materials roots are traced back to 1926 with the founding of Rainier Pulp and Paper Company in San Francisco, California. Its first mill opened the next year in Shelton, Washington, and Port Angeles on the Olympic Peninsula. The mill used Tsuga heterophylla (western hemlock) trees to create a premium bleached paper pulp. In 1931, Rainier Pulp and Paper began working with the Du Pont chemical company to produce hemlock pulp for the manufacture of rayon. Two additional pulp mills were constructed and began operation in the state of Washington. Rainier Pulp and Paper changed its name to Rayonier, a portmanteau of the words, "rayon" and "Rainier", in 1937, when it became a publicly traded company. The following year, the company acquired timber stands in the southeastern United States and began construction of a Fernandina Beach, Florida, pulp mill, which began production in 1939.

In 1944, the company moved its offices to New York City. As World War II ended, Rayonier began making large land purchases in the Pacific Northwest. The Rayonier Foundation was created in 1952 to provide assistance to charitable, civic and education organizations in the communities where Rayonier did business. Rayonier opened international sales offices in Europe and Asia during 1954. That same year, another pulp mill in the southeast was constructed at Jesup, Georgia. High demand prompted the facility to double its capacity by 1957.

ITT purchased the company in 1968 and the name changed to ITT Rayonier. The Jesup mill grew larger in 1974, becoming the largest pulp mill on earth. Company headquarters were moved again in 1978; this time to Stamford, Connecticut. Diplomatic relations with China were restored in 1979. The following year, Rayonier received orders for pulp and logs. It took almost five years to receive permission to open an office in Beijing, China in 1985. A log-trading office was opened in New Zealand during 1988. The New Zealand government sold Rayonier 250,000 acres (1,000 km^{2}) of timberland in 1992.

The company was spun off from ITT in 1994 with the company name reverting to Rayonier and shares again traded on the New York Stock Exchange. Rayonier purchased 969,000 acres (3,920 km^{2}) of timberland in Florida, Georgia and Alabama in 1999, then relocated the corporate offices to Jacksonville, Florida to be closer to company employees and properties.

=== 21st century ===
Rayonier converted to a real estate investment trust (REIT) on January 1, 2004. TerraPointe LLC was established in 2005 to manage properties with development potential. The 2006 purchase of 228,000 acres (920 km^{2}) in six states brought the company's total of land owned, leased or managed to 2,600,000 acres (11,000 km^{2}) in the U.S. and New Zealand. In March 2008, the company purchased 56,300 acres (228 km^{2}) for $215 million in southwest Washington state from Sierra Pacific

In March 2013, the company sold its wood products division, including its mills in Baxley, Swainsboro, and Eatonton, Georgia, to British Columbia-based International Forest Products (Interfor) for $80 million.

In April 2013, the company increased its shareholding in the joint venture Matariki Forestry Group in New Zealand from 26% to 65% for $140 million.

=== Creation of Rayonier Advanced Materials ===
In June 2014, the company split its operations into two independent companies: Performance Fibers on one hand is named Rayonier Advanced Materials (NYSE: RYAM) and Forest Resources together with Real Estate as a REIT on the other hand continues as Rayonier, Inc., headed by David L. Nunes as its new CEO. Shareholders of Rayonier have received one share of the new Rayonier Advanced Materials company for every three shares of Rayonier on June 27, 2014.
