= Rayonier =

American real estate investment trust

Rayonier Inc.
- Type: Public
- Traded as: NYSE: RYN; S&P 400 component
- Industry: Timber
- Founded: 1926; 100 years ago
- Headquarters: Wildlight, Florida, U.S.
- Key people: Scott Jones (Chairman); Mark D. McHugh (President and CEO); Douglas M. Long (SVP and Chief Resource Officer)
- Products: Timber; real estate
- Revenue: ▲US$1,263 million (2024)
- Net income: ▲US$359 million (2024)
- Number of employees: 424 (332 in US)
- Website: rayonier.com

Rayonier Inc., headquartered in Wildlight, Florida is a timberland real estate investment trust ("REIT") with assets located in softwood timber growing regions in the United States and New Zealand. Its core business segments are timber, real estate, and wood products.

As of December 31, 2024, the company owned or leased approximately 4.2 million acres of timberlands overall, located in the U.S. South (1.75 million acres) and U.S. Pacific Northwest (308,000 acres).

== History ==
Rayonier was founded in 1926 as the Rainier Pulp and Paper Company in Shelton, Washington, with a headquarters office in San Francisco, California. Its name was inspired by Mount Rainier in Washington state. Its first mill opened the next year in Shelton Washington, on the Olympic Peninsula. The mill used Tsuga heterophylla (western hemlock) trees to create a premium bleached paper pulp.

In September 1930, Rainier Pulp and Paper began working with the DuPont chemical company to produce hemlock pulp for the manufacture of rayon. Two additional pulp mills were constructed and began operation in the state of Washington at Hoquiam, Washington and Port Angeles, Washington.

Rainier Pulp and Paper changed its name to Rayonier, a portmanteau of the words rayon and Rainier, in 1937, when it became a publicly traded company. The following year, the company acquired timber stands in the southeastern United States, and began construction of a Fernandina Beach, Florida, pulp mill, which began production in 1939.

In 1944, the company moved its offices to New York City. As World War II ended, Rayonier began making large land purchases in the Pacific Northwest. The Rayonier Foundation was created in 1952 to provide assistance to charitable, civic and education organizations in the communities where Rayonier did business.

Rayonier opened international sales offices in Europe and Asia during 1954. That same year, another pulp mill in the southeast was constructed at Jesup, Georgia. High demand prompted the facility to double its capacity by 1957.

ITT purchased the company in 1968 and the name changed to ITT Rayonier.

The Jesup mill was expanded in 1974, becoming the largest pulp mill on earth.

Company headquarters were moved again in 1978; this time to Stamford, Connecticut.

Diplomatic relations with China were restored in 1979. The following year, Rayonier received orders for pulp and logs. It took almost five years to receive permission to open an office in Beijing in 1985.

A log-trading office was opened in New Zealand during 1988. The New Zealand government sold Rayonier 250,000 acres (1,000 km^{2}) of timberland in 1992.

The company was spun off from ITT in 1994 with the company name reverting to Rayonier and shares again traded on the New York Stock Exchange.

Rayonier purchased 969,000 acres (3,920 km^{2}) of timberland in Florida, Georgia and Alabama in 1999, then relocated the corporate offices to Jacksonville, Florida, to be closer to company employees and properties.

Rayonier converted to a real estate investment trust (REIT) on January 1, 2004. TerraPointe LLC was established in 2005 to manage properties with development potential.

The 2006 purchase of 228,000 acres (920 km^{2}) in six states brought the company's total of land owned, leased or managed to 2,600,000 acres (11,000 km^{2}) in the U.S. and New Zealand.

In March 2008, the company purchased 56,300 acres (228 km^{2}) for $215 million in southwest Washington state from Sierra Pacific

In March 2013, the company sold its wood products division, including its mills in Baxley, Swainsboro, and Eatonton, Georgia, to British Columbia-based International Forest Products (Interfor) for $80 million.

In April 2013, the company increased its shareholding in the joint venture Matariki Forestry Group in New Zealand from 26% to 65% for $140 million.

In May 2014, Rayonier named David L. Nunes as post-separation president and CEO for Rayonier.

A class action against members of the former management team by certain shareholders was launched for the period from October 26, 2010, to November 7, 2014, claiming over-harvesting while communicating publicly harvesting below a sustainable rate. On October 5, 2017, the court entered orders approving the settlement and a plan of distribution terminating these class actions.

In June 2014, Rayonier spun off its performance fibers business into an independent, publicly traded company, Rayonier Advanced Materials Inc. (NYSE: RYAM). Shareholders of Rayonier received one share of the new Rayonier Advanced Materials company for every three shares of Rayonier on June 27, 2014.

In August 2015, Rayonier announced its ownership in the New Zealand joint venture will increase from 65% to approximately 77%, as part of an anticipated recapitalization of the JV.

In May 2016, Rayonier announced upgrades to its Pacific Northwest timberland portfolio through the acquisition of 61,000 acres of timberlands in western Oregon for $263 million, and a disposition of 55,000 acres comprising predominantly pre-merchantable timber in Washington state for $130 million.

In August 2017, Rayonier consolidated its corporate headquarters, real estate, and forest resources offices into a newly constructed, state-of-the-art building in Wildlight, Florida. The company is currently constructing a 23,600 acre development in Wildlight. It began work on phase two of the project in 2022, developing 15,000 acres of land.

In May 2020, Rayonier acquired Pope Resources in the Pacific Northwest.

In March 2025, Rayonier announced the intended sale of its interest in the New Zealand Joint Venture to the Rohatyn Group for $710 million.

In October 2025, Rayonier and PotlatchDeltic announced a plan to combine in an all-stock deal creating a $7.1 billion forestry company. The combined company will own roughly 4.2 million acres of US timberland. Rayonier announced that it will be relocating its headquarters to Atlanta, Georgia, in the first quarter of 2027, while retaining regional offices in Spokane, Washington, and Wildlight, Florida. The deal closed in January, 2026.

== Business segments ==
- Timber (47% of total sales for 2024)
- U.S. real estate (51% of total sales for 2024)
- Trading (2% of total sales for 2024).
