= Sun Communities =

Real estate investment trust

Sun Communities, Inc.
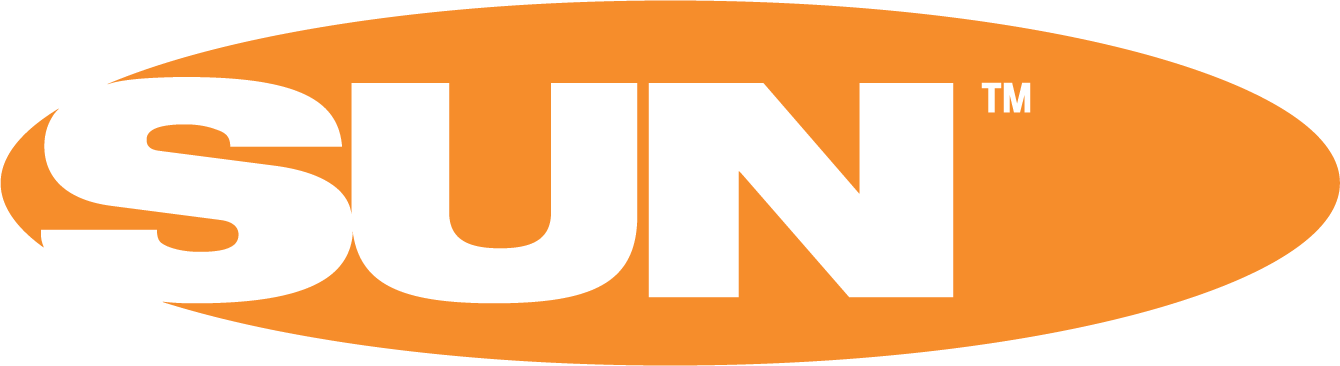
- Type: Public
- Traded as: NYSE: SUI; S&P 400 component
- Industry: Real estate investment trust
- Founded: 1975; 51 years ago
- Headquarters: Southfield, Michigan, U.S.
- Key people: Gary A. Shiffman, Chairman; Charles D. Young, CEO; John B. McLaren, President; Bruce D. Thelen, COO; Fernando Castro-Caratini, CFO; Marc Farrugia, CAO; Aaron Weiss, EVP
- Revenue: ▲US$3.23 billion (2025)
- Net income: ▲US$1.2 billion (2025)
- Total assets: ▼US$12.8 billion (2025)
- Number of employees: 6,590 (2025)
- Website: suninc.com

Sun Communities, Inc. is a publicly traded real estate investment trust that invests in manufactured housing communities and recreational vehicle communities. As of December 31, 2025, the company owned interests in 513 such properties in the United States, Canada, and the UK.

Sun Communities is listed on the New York Stock Exchange under the symbol: SUI. Gary Shiffman is chairman of Sun Communities, and has been a director since the company went public in 1993. Charles D. Young serves as the company's current Chief Executive Officer.

== Brands ==
Sun Outdoors (formerly known as Sun RV Resorts) is the RV resort division of Sun Communities, Inc. and was established in 1996. It is the owner and operator of more than 170 resorts and campgrounds across the United States and Canada.

== History ==
The company dates to 1975. In December 1993, the company became a public company via an initial public offering. In March 1996, the company acquired 25 manufactured housing communities for $226 million. In 1996, Sun RV Resorts was established.

In June 2016, the company acquired a portfolio of 103-communities mostly located in California, Florida, and Ontario, Canada for $1.7 billion from an affiliate of Centerbridge Partners. In October 2019, the company acquired a portfolio of 31 manufactured housing communities for $343.6 million. In September 2020, the company acquired Safe Harbor Marinas for $2.11 billion. On Nov. 16, 2021, Sun RV Resorts Rebrands to Sun Outdoors.

In April 2022, the company acquired Park Holidays UK for $1.3 billion. In October 2025, Charles D. Young succeeded Gary A. Shiffman as Chief Executive Officer. Mr. Shiffman continues to serve as Chairman of the Board.
