= Pool Corporation =

American consumer products company

- Trade name: POOLCORP
- Type: Public
- Traded as: Nasdaq: POOL; S&P 600 component
- Industry: Swimming pools
- Founded: 1980; 46 years ago in Metairie, Louisiana, U.S.
- Founder: Frank St. Romain
- Headquarters: Covington, Louisiana, U.S.
- Key people: Peter D. Arvan, President and CEO; John E. Stokely, Chairman; Melanie M. Housey Hart, CFO
- Revenue: ▼US$5.541 billion (2023)
- Operating income: ▼US$746 million (2023)
- Net income: ▼US$523 million (2023)
- Total assets: ▼US$3.428 billion (2023)
- Total equity: ▲US$1.312 billion (2023)
- Owner: Berkshire Hathaway (1%)
- Number of employees: Approximately 6,000 (2023)
- Website: www.poolcorp.com

Pool Corporation, doing business as POOLCORP, is the largest distributor of supplies, equipment, and machinery for swimming pools worldwide. The company is organized in Delaware and headquartered in Covington, Louisiana. It serves approximately 125,000 customers and operates 439 sales centers in North America, Europe and Australia. The company receives over half of its revenue from the California, Texas, Florida, and Arizona markets and has benefited from population shifts to warmer climates. In 2023, the company received 62% of its revenue from maintenance and minor repair products, 24% of its revenue from products used in pool renovations, and 14% of its revenue from products used in pool construction.

== History ==
Pool Corporation was founded in 1980 as South Central Pool Supply by Frank J. St. Romain.

In 1993, the company was purchased by Code Hennessey's & Simmons. In 1995, the company was renamed SCP Pool Corporation and became a public company via an initial public offering. The company was renamed Pool Corporation on May 16, 2006.

In 1999, the company acquired Benson Pump Company, Pratts Plastics Limited, certain assets of Garden Leisure Products, and Jean Albouy, S.A. for a total of $25.5 million.

The company's business improved significantly during the COVID-19 lockdowns due to an increase in pool construction. However, sales slowed when the lockdowns ended.

In 2021, the company acquired Porpoise Pool & Patio, the largest franchisor of pool and outdoor living stores in the U.S.

On October 28, 2025, POOLCORP rang the Opening Bell at Nasdaq MarketSite in Times Square, celebrating its 30th anniversary as a publicly traded company.

On May 4, 2026, POOLCORP announced that John B. Watwood had been appointed President and Chief Executive Officer, succeeding Peter D. Arvan. John E. Stokely was simultaneously named Executive Chair of the Board.

November, 16, 2026 POOLCORP announced an agreement to acquire Team Horner Group, a Fort Lauderdale-based distributor. Team Horner's HornerXpress division operates 18 sales center, 17 in Florida and one in New York. Both companies expect the deal to close in the first quarter of 2027, subject to regulatory and closing conditions.

== Controversies ==
In 2011, the company was accused by the Federal Trade Commission of antitrust practices by pressuring its suppliers to not conduct business with its competitors. In January 2012, the company settled with a consent order which prohibited the company from continuing the practice.
