= PDC Energy =

American energy company

- Company type: Subsidiary
- Traded as: Nasdaq: PDCE
- Industry: Independent Oil & Gas Industry
- Founded: 1969
- Headquarters: United States, Denver, Colorado
- Products: Oil & Gas Production
- Parent: Chevron Corporation
- Website: www.pdce.com

PDC Energy is an international natural gas and oil company. Its properties located mainly in Ohio and West Virginia. Until its acquisition by Chevron Corporation on August 7, 2023, the company was publicly traded on NASDAQ under the symbol "PDCE".

PDC Energy Incorporation started its earliest exploration and production activities in 1969. Now is headquarter is in Denver, Colorado. PDC Energy was previously named Petroleum Development Corporation and changed it into PDC Energy Inc. in June 2012.

In March 2012, PDC Energy appointed Lance Lauck as Senior Vice President of Corporate Development, and appointed Lauck and Gysle Shellum to the Planning and Finance Committee.

In February 2013, PDC Energy agreed to sell its non-core Colorado holdings to Caerus Oil and Gas LLC for approximately $200 million.
