= SM Energy =

Company engaged in hydrocarbon exploration headquartered in Denver, Colorado

SM Energy Company
- Type: Public
- Traded as: NYSE: SM; S&P 600 component
- Industry: Petroleum industry
- Founded: 1908; 118 years ago
- Headquarters: Denver, Colorado, U.S.
- Key people: Herbert S. Vogel (President & CEO); A. Wade Pursell (Executive Vice President & CFO); Beth A. McDonald (Executive Vice President & COO); Julio M. Quintana (Chairman of the Board)
- Products: Petroleum; Natural gas; Natural gas liquids
- Production output: 170.5 thousand barrels of oil equivalent (1,043,000 GJ) per day (2024)
- Revenue: ▲US$3.15 billion (2025)
- Net income: ▼US$648 million (2025)
- Number of employees: 663 (2024)
- Website: sm-energy.com

SM Energy Company is a company engaged in hydrocarbon exploration. It is organized in Delaware and headquartered in Denver, Colorado.

The company's assets are in the Eagle Ford Group/South Texas (51% of reserves and 48% of 2024 production), the Permian Basin/Midland Basin (34% of reserves and 47% of 2024 production), and the Uinta Basin (15% of reserves and 5% of 2024 production).

As of December 31, 2024, the company had 678.3 million barrels of oil equivalent (4.150×10^{9} GJ) of estimated proved reserves, of which 44% was petroleum, 18% was natural gas liquids, and 38% was natural gas.

== History ==
The company was founded in 1908 as the St. Mary Parish Land Company and was incorporated in 1915. In 1992, the company went public via an initial public offering. In May 2010, the company changed its name from St. Mary Land & Exploration Company to SM Energy.

=== Acquisitions and divestitures ===
Date	Acquisition / Divestiture	Company	Price	Ref(s).
January 2010	Divestiture	Assets in the Rocky Mountains	$267 million	
December 2011	Divestiture	Partial interest in Eagle Ford Group holdings to Mitsui & Co.	$680 million	
November 2013	Divestiture	Assets in the Anadarko Basin	$329 million	
July 2014	Acquisition	66,000 acres in the Bakken Formation	$330 million	
June 2015	Divestiture	Assets in the Arkoma Basin	$270 million	
July 2015	Divestiture	76,300 net acres in Ark-La-Tex	Undisclosed	
August 2016	Acquisition	Rock Oil Holdings LLC, which owned 24,783 net acres in Howard County, Texas	$980 million	
October 2016	Acquisition	Assets in West Texas	$1.6 billion	
October 2016	Divestiture	Assets in the Williston Basin sold to Oasis Petroleum	$800 million	
March 2017	Divestiture	Assets in the Eagle Ford Group	$800 million	
January 2018	Divestiture	112,200 Acre Leasehold In The Powder River Basin	$500 million	
May 2018	Divestiture	Assets in the Williston Basin	$249.2 million	
June 2024	Acquisition	Assets in the Uinta Basin	$2.1 billion	
