= Equitrans Midstream =

American natural gas pipeline company

Equitrans Midstream Corporation
- Company type: Subsidiary
- Traded as: NYSE: ETRN
- Industry: Petroleum industry
- Founded: November 12, 2018; 6 years ago
- Headquarters: Canonsburg, Pennsylvania, U.S.
- Key people: Thomas F. Karam, President & CEO; Diana M. Charletta, Executive Vice President & Chief Operating Officer; Kirk R. Oliver, Senior Vice President & CFO
- Products: Natural gas; Natural gas liquids
- Revenue: ▼US$1.3 billion (2021)
- Net income: ▼US$–1.3 billion (2021)
- Total assets: ▼US$0.4 billion (2021)
- Total equity: ▼US$2.0 billion (2021)
- Number of employees: 766 (2021)
- Parent: EQT Corporation
- Website: www.equitransmidstream.com

Equitrans Midstream Corporation, also known as E-Train, is an American energy company engaged in the pipeline transportion of natural gas and natural gas liquids. It is headquartered in Canonsburg, Pennsylvania, and is a wholly owned subsidiary of EQT Corporation.

== Corporate history ==
In November 2018, EQT Corporation split into two companies. Equitrans Midstream, a stand-alone corporation, retained EQT's assets, and remained engaged in the midstream gathering and transportation of natural gas and natural gas liquids. EQT Corporation remained involved only in gas exploration and production. EQT retained a 19.9 percent interest in Equitrans Midstream, (since reduced to 5.3% in 2022) and was awarded a general partner interest in EOGP Holdings LP, a company formed in 2015 to hold a general interest partnership in EQM Midstream Partners LP. Equitrans Midstream also retained a small limited partner interest in EQM Midstream Partners.

EQT Corporation also spun off EQM Midstream Partners, a company with the mission of acquiring midstream assets in the Appalachian Basin. Equitrans Midstream acquired EQM Midstream Partners in a share-for-share merger worth ($2,187,000,000 in 2024 dollars). The merger was finalized in June 2020.

As of October 2021, Equitrans Midstream was the largest natural gas producer in North America.

In March 2023, EQT announced it would acquire Equitrans Midstream in all-stock deal worth $5.5 billion, or about $14 billion including debt, with the intention to create a vertically integrated natural-gas provider. The acquisition was completed in July 2024.

== Mountain Valley Pipeline ==
Equitrans Midstream is co-financing the Mountain Valley Pipeline, of which it owns a majority 48 percent interest. The $2.5 billion, 303 mi (488 km) project was announced in 2014, and expected to be in service by 2018. It will connect Marcellus and Utica natural gas shale fields with East Coast markets.

Numerous legal challenges have delayed the project, On January 25, 2022, a unanimous United States Court of Appeals for the Fourth Circuit revoked permits issued by the United States Forest Service and Bureau of Land Management allowing construction of the pipeline through the Jefferson National Forest after finding that the environmental reviews conducted by the two agencies failed to comply with the National Environmental Policy Act. Nine days later, the same court unanimously struck down permits issued by the United States Fish and Wildlife Service on the similar grounds, concluding the agency failed to comply with the Endangered Species Act of 1973. After Equitrans won an April 11 ruling by the Federal Energy Regulatory Commission allowing it to use a trenchless method of crossing water and wetlands, Equitrans Midstream asked federal agencies for new permits on May 2, 2022.

The Mountain Valley Pipeline is 94 percent complete. Equitrans, which has already spent $2.6 billion on the project and expects to spend another $800 million, estimated in May 2022 that if permission is again given, the pipeline will be completed and go into operation in the second half of 2023.

In July 2022, Senator Joe Manchin III (D-West Virginia) secured an agreement from Democratic leaders of the U.S. Senate and the White House which would move completion of the pipeline forward. The agreement, to be included in major climate and tax legislation, "would ensure that federal agencies 'take all necessary actions to permit the construction and operation' of the gas line". The legislation ensures that future legal challenges to the pipeline will be heard by the United States Court of Appeals for the District of Columbia Circuit in the future. Opponents filed constitutional legal challenges to the inclusion of the project in the Fiscal Responsibility Act of 2023 after federal permits were granted.
