= Amedisys =

American healthcare company

Amedisys, Inc.
- Type: Subsidiary
- Traded as: Nasdaq: AMED
- ISIN: ISIN: US0234361089
- Founded: 1982; 44 years ago
- Founder: William F. Borne, MATT HESSION
- Headquarters: Baton Rouge, Louisiana, U.S.
- Key people: Paul Kusserow (chairman & CEO); Scott Ginn (CFO & EVP)
- Revenue: ▲US$2.071 Billion (Fiscal Year Ended December 31, 2020)
- Operating income: ▲US$219.268 Million (Fiscal Year Ended December 31, 2020)
- Net income: ▲US$185.184 Million (Fiscal Year Ended December 31, 2020)
- Total assets: ▲US$1.567 Billion (Fiscal Year Ended December 31, 2020)
- Total equity: ▲US$810.741 Million (Fiscal Year Ended December 31, 2020)
- Number of employees: 21,000
- Parent: UnitedHealth Group
- Website: amedisys.com

Amedisys, Inc. is an American healthcare company based in Baton Rouge, Louisiana. They are one of the largest home health providers and second largest hospice care provider in the United States.

Amedisys provides in-home skilled nursing, physical therapy, occupational therapy and speech language pathology, medical social work, home aides, and hospice and bereavement services, with 11 million patient care visits in 2011.

Amedisys employs more than 21,000 individuals at more than 500 locations in 39 states and Washington, D.C. In 2010, annual revenues were approximately $1.6 billion. Amedisys was ranked 999 on the Fortune 1000 in 2011.

In June 2023, Optum (a division of UnitedHealth Group) agreed to acquire Amedisys for $3.3 billion. The acquisition was completed during 2025.

== History and governance ==
Amedisys was founded in 1982 by William F. Borne, a registered nurse from Reserve, Louisiana and William Matt Hession (registered nurse). CEO of Key Nursing. Borne has been chief executive officer (CEO) and chairman of the board since that time. In 1993, the company completed a reverse acquisition with M&N Capital Corp, and began trading on the NASDAQ Small Cap Market in 1994. Additional public offerings of its common stock were completed in 2004 and 2006.

As of Nov. 6, 2011, the members of the board of directors of Amedisys were: William F. Borne, chairman; Don Washburn, lead director; Ronald LaBorde; Jake L. Netterville, CPA; David Pitts, and Peter Ricchiuti. Borne resigned as CEO, chairman, and director of Amedisys on February 24, 2014, 33 years after founding the company, and was named Chairman Emeritus by the company's Board of Directors. Ronald (Ronnie) A. LaBorde was named Interim CEO, having been Amedisys president and chief financial office for two years, and a member of the Board of Directors for 17 years.

In June 2011, Amedisys closed the acquisition of Beacon Hospice, a New England provider of hospice services with 24 locations in five states.

In March 2008, Amedisys closed the acquisition of TLC Health Care Services, a home health provider with more than 100 locations.

Amedisys announced March 28, 2014, it was closing 29 care centers (23 home health and six hospice) and consolidating another 25 (21 home health and four hospice). The Concord (NH) office of Beacon Hospice was closed on April 30, 2014. Hyder Family Hospice House (Dover, NH), one of the facilities in the Beacon Hospice acquisition, was also to be closed. Hyder House was the only in-patient hospice facility in Strafford County, NH. (Hyder House was expected to transfer to county ownership on August 1, 2014.)

Amedisys announced a $150-million settlement with the U.S. Department of Justice on April 23, 2014. This settlement was about Medicare reimbursements for home health services by some Amedisys care centers from January 1, 2008, through December 31, 2010, as well as a Stark Law infraction involving care services provided to a physician group in exchange for compensation inconsistent with fair market value from April 1, 2008, through April 30, 2012, an issue Amedisys had voluntarily disclosed. The $150 million included more than $26 million to settle six whistleblower lawsuits in Pennsylvania and one in Georgia. The $150 million is five times what a leading analyst in the industry estimates Amedisys will earn in 2014 before income taxes, depreciation, and amortization.

In June 2023, Optum agreed to acquire Amedisys for $3.3 billion. It rejected a prior offer from Option Care that it initially agreed to the previous month.

== Recognitions ==
Amedisys is accredited by the Accreditation Commission for Health Care (ACHC).

In June 2011, three Amedisys care centers were awarded the first Integrated Health Care Standards Accreditation for Behavioral Health Disorders by ACHC.

In 2010 and 2011, under the Medicare Home Health Pay for Performance (HHP4P) demonstration Amedisys received the largest reward in both years ($3.6 million in 2010, $4.7 million in 2011). HHP4P shared more than $15 million in savings with 166 home health agencies that either maintained high levels of quality or made significant improvements in quality of care.

In July 2011, Amedisys was named Innovator of the Year during the 2011 Louisiana Governor’s Technology Awards for its patient care management web application for physicians, Mercury Doc.

In October 2011, over 250 Amedisys agencies were named to the 2011 HomeCare Elite, a compilation of the top-performing home health agencies based on quality outcomes, quality improvement and financial performance. One-hundred-four Amedisys care centers have been honored multiple times, including 13 that have been acknowledged every year since the inception of the HomeCare Elite in 2005.

In 2010, Amedisys launched the first nationwide home health care transitions program, aiming to reduce unnecessary hospital readmissions through patient education and care coordination. The program and a Georgia case study demonstrating a downward trend in acute care hospitalization rate were highlighted in Home Health Quality Improvement Campaign's Cross Settings I – Best Practice Intervention Package.

== Foundation and charitable giving ==
In 2005, Amedisys established a 501(c)(3) nonprofit organization, the Christen Foundation, to distribute contributions to local nonprofit organizations and employees in need. The Christen Foundation also administers donations to Amedisys’ Hospice Fund.

Amedisys employees’ contributions rank second in the nation in fundraising for the American Heart Association, next to only the American Heart Association itself.
