= Cerence =

AI software company

Cerence Inc.
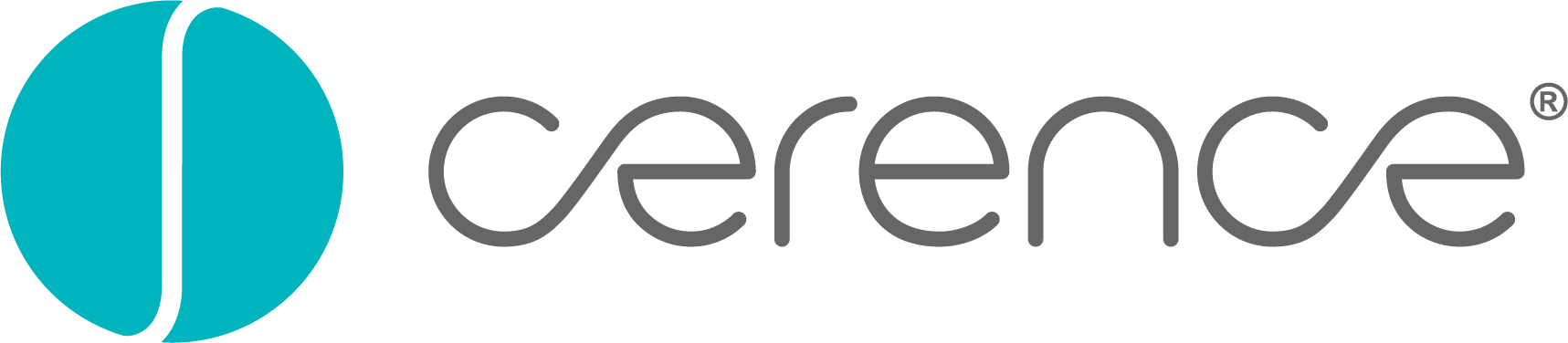
- Company type: Public
- Traded as: Nasdaq: CRNC
- Industry: Artificial intelligence; Automotive
- Predecessor: Nuance Communications (automotive division)
- Founded: 2019; 7 years ago
- Headquarters: Burlington, Massachusetts, U.S.
- Key people: Brian Krzanich (CEO); Arun Sarin (chairman)
- Products: Automotive AI, Voice assistant technology
- Revenue: ▲US$332 million (2024)
- Operating income: ▲ −US$580 million (2024)
- Net income: ▲ −US$588 million (2024)
- Total assets: ▼US$702 million (2024)
- Total equity: ▼US$141 million (2024)
- Number of employees: c. 1,400 (2024)
- Website: cerence.com

Cerence Inc. is an American multinational software company that develops artificial intelligence (AI) assistant technology primarily for automobiles.

== History ==
Cerence was founded in October 2019, after Nuance Communications decided to turn its automotive division into an independent company. Nuance had provided voice recognition technology to car manufacturers for twenty years prior to the spin-off, and its technology was built into half of the new cars shipped globally in the first six months of 2019. Cerence's first official trading day on the Nasdaq exchange was October 2, 2019. The company assumed control of previously Nuance-held contracts with approximately 60 automakers including BMW, Ford, and Toyota. Since becoming its own entity, Cerence signed new deals to install voice recognition and assistance technology in Fiat Chrysler and Mercedes-Benz vehicles. In January 2020, LG announced that it would start integrating Cerence's voice assistant into its in-car infotainment systems. On 30 September 2021, VinFast reported that Cerence software will be used for its electric vehicles as an intelligence voice assistant.

As of August 2021, Cerence's AI assistant technology had been installed on over 400 million cars worldwide.

Cerence received an Automotive News PACE Award in September 2021 for Cerence Pay, a technology that allows drivers to pay for fuel via voice commands.

== Products ==
Cerence develops automotive AI products, primarily focusing on voice assistant technology. Its voice assistant technology is not device-specific, and is white-labeled for auto manufacturers. The company's products integrate into a car's operating system and allow drivers to use speech for a variety of actions, for example to control their GPS, entertainment system, and climate settings rather than using manual controls. Cerence's technology also incorporates facial recognition and customized responses to individual drivers. As of 2021, Cerence's speech recognition software recognizes 70 different languages and dialects. The technology can work with other voice assistant and AI devices such as those developed by Apple Inc. and Google. Drivers using the voice technology in their car can make a request and the Cerence software would help route it appropriately to the right system or virtual assistant that can best respond, essentially acting as a "switchboard" to access information from other AI and voice assistants.

The company is also developing technology that provides drivers with the ability to control some in-car systems with brief glances or gestures.
