= Entegris =

American supplier

Entegris, Inc.
- Type: Public
- Traded as: Nasdaq: ENTG; S&P 400 component
- Industry: Microelectronics materials and components
- Founded: 1966; 60 years ago
- Headquarters: Billerica, Massachusetts, U.S.
- Key people: David Reeder (CEO & president)
- Revenue: ▼US$3.20 billion (2025)
- Net income: ▼US$236 million (2025)
- Number of employees: ~9,000 worldwide
- Website: entegris.com

Entegris, Inc. is a supplier of materials for the semiconductor and other high-tech industries. Entegris has approximately 9,000 employees throughout its global operations. It has manufacturing, customer service and/or research facilities in the United States, Canada, China, Germany, Israel, Japan, Malaysia, Singapore, South Korea, and Taiwan. The company’s corporate headquarters are in Billerica, Massachusetts.

The company's products are used by manufacturers to increase yields by improving contamination control in several key processes, including photolithography, wet etch and clean, chemical-mechanical planarization, thin-film deposition, bulk chemical processing, wafer and reticle handling and shipping, and testing, assembly and packaging. Approximately 80% of the company's products are used in the semiconductor industry.

== Products ==
Entegris products include: filtration products that purify process gases and fluids, as well as the ambient environment; liquid systems and components that dispense, control, or transport process fluids; high-performance materials and specialty gas management solutions; wafer carriers and shippers that protect the semiconductor wafer from contamination and breakage; and specialized graphite, silicon carbide, and coatings.

== Mergers and acquisitions ==
1999: The company was incorporated as the combined entity of Fluoroware, Inc., which began operating in 1966, and EMPAK, Inc., a semiconductor manufacturer in Colorado Springs.

2000: The company went public under the name Entegris in July 2000.

2005: Entegris merged with Mykrolis Corporation, a publicly held supplier of filtration products to the semiconductor industry, which had been spun-off off the Millipore Corporation in 2001.

2008: Entegris acquired Poco Graphite, Inc., a Decatur, Texas supplier of specialized graphite and silicon carbide products for use in semiconductor, EDM, glass bottling, biomedical, aerospace, and alternative energy applications.

2014: Entegris acquired Danbury, Connecticut-based ATMI, a publicly held company providing critical materials and materials-handling solutions to the semiconductor industry, in a $1.1 billion transaction.

2020: Entegris announced an investment of US$500 million, building a state-of-the-art facility in Kaohsiung Science Park in Taiwan.

2022: Entegris acquired another U.S. semiconductor chemicals company, CMC Materials Inc., for $5.7 billion.

=== Divestitures ===
2023: Entegris sold its electronic chemicals business to Fujifilm for $700 million in cash.

2024: Entegris sold it's Pipeline and Industrial Materials (PIM) business to SCF Partners for $285 million cash and a $25 million earn out.
