= Halozyme =

Biotechnology company

Halozyme Therapeutics, Inc.
- Company type: Public
- Traded as: Nasdaq: HALO; S&P 400 component
- ISIN: US40637H1095
- Industry: Pharmaceuticals; Biotech
- Founded: 1998; 28 years ago
- Headquarters: San Diego, California, US
- Area served: Worldwide
- Key people: Helen Torley (president, CEO)
- Revenue: ▲US$288 million (2019)
- Number of employees: 136 (February 17, 2021)
- Website: www.halozyme.com

Halozyme Therapeutics, Inc. is an American biotechnology company. It develops oncology therapies designed to target the tumor microenvironment.

The company was founded in 1998 and went public in 2004. Halozyme is headquartered in San Diego, California.

== Company history ==
Halozyme's business is primarily focused on its proprietary and patented recombinant human hyaluronidase enzyme, rHuPH20. The company's development pipeline is concentrated in clinical stage and pre-clinical stage oncology products, including its proprietary investigational drug, PEGPH20, a pegylated version of rHuPH20, which targets hyaluronan (HA) high tumors. The company is in various phases of clinical trials with PEGPH20 across multiple solid tumor types, including pancreatic cancer, non-small cell lung cancer (NSCLC), and gastric cancer, to test the drug's safety and efficacy. Halozyme has one FDA approved product (Hylenex recombinant, hyaluronidase human injection). The company also licenses its drug delivery technology Enhanze to other biopharmaceutical companies, including Roche, Baxalta, Pfizer, Janssen, AbbVie, Bristol Myers Squibb and Lilly.

== Company leadership ==
Since January 2014, Helen Torley has been Chief Executive Officer and President of Halozyme.

== Approved products ==
Hylenex: Approved by the U.S. Food and Drug Administration (FDA) on 12/02/2005. Hylenex is a hyaluronidase (human recombinant) injection indicated for use in subcutaneous fluid administration, dispersion and absorption of injected drugs, and subcutaneous urography.

== Technology ==
Enhanze: Uses recombinant human hyaluronidase to degrade HA and aids in the absorption and dispersion of co-administered injected drugs. Halozyme licenses its Enhanze drug delivery platform technology to other biopharmaceutical companies to enable intravenous to subcutaneous administration conversion and dose optimization.

== Product candidates ==
PEGPH20: A PEGylated drug candidate based on Halozyme's proprietary rHuPH20 enzyme (a recombinant human hyaluronidase enzyme). It breaks down or depletes hyaluronan (HA), which can build up in certain tumors. The goal of PEGPH20 is to break down HA so that some anti-cancer therapies and activated immune cells can better reach the cancer cells of HA-high tumors. On November 4, 2019, Halozyme announced it has halted development of PEGPH20.

== Pipeline candidates ==
PEG-ADA2: An engineered human recombinant enzyme, adenosine deaminase 2, for decreasing the concentration of immune-suppressive adenosine in the tumor microenvironment, and PEGylated to prolong its circulation in the body. It has been tested in colon, lung, and pancreatic cancer models in preclinical studies.

HTI-1511 Anti-EGFR ADC: An antibody-drug conjugate (ADC) with a strong cytotoxin, monomethyl auristatin E, designed to treat EGFR-positive tumors, including those with KRAS and BRAF mutations. It has been tested in colon, lung, and cholangiocarcinoma models in preclinical studies.

== Clinical trial pipeline ==
Halozyme has many ongoing and completed clinical trials testing the safety and efficacy of its primary investigational drug, PEGPH20, in combination with other therapies, with the goal of finding new treatments for pancreatic cancer, NSCLC, gastric cancer, breast cancer, and others. As of October 2016, the company was sponsoring or collaborating on several clinical trials that were recruiting patients, including:

- HALO Pancreatic 301 – A Phase 3 study to test the efficacy and safety of a combination of PEGPH20 with Abraxane (nab-paclitaxel) and gemcitabine in participants with previously untreated HA-high stage IV pancreatic cancer. On November 4, 2019, Halozyme announced it has halted development of PEGPH20.
- HALO Lung / Gastric 101 – A Phase 1b study to test the efficacy and safety of a combination of PEGPH20 and Keytruda (pembrolizumab) in participants with relapsed/refractory advanced or metastatic NSCLC and relapsed/refractory locally advanced or metastatic gastric adenocarcinoma.
- A Phase 1b study to test the efficacy and safety of a combination of PEGPH20 with Halaven (eribulin) in participants with human epidermal growth factor receptor 2 (HER2)-negative, HA-high metastatic breast cancer (MBC).
