= Southwestern Energy =

Energy Company

Southwestern Energy Company
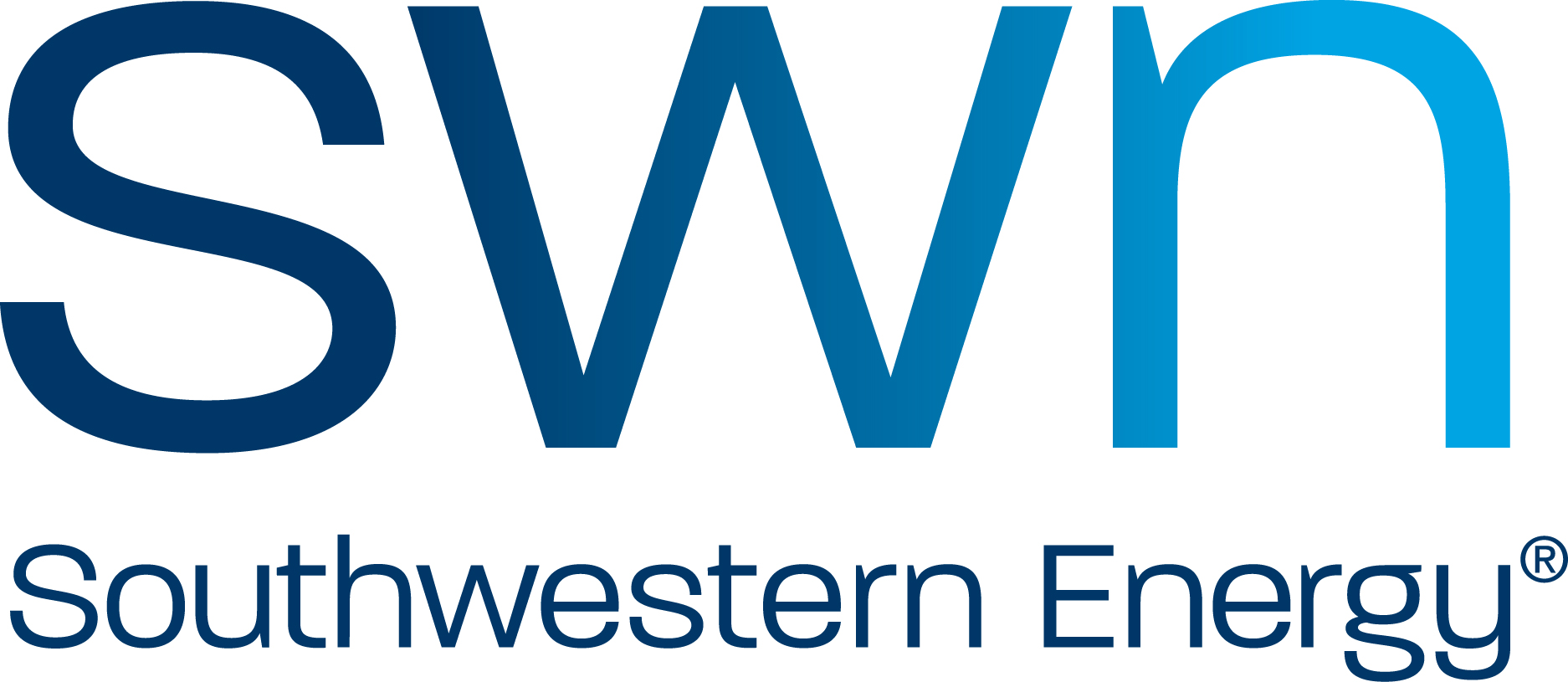
- Industry: Petroleum industry
- Founded: 1929; 97 years ago (as Arkansas Western Gas Company)
- Defunct: October 1, 2024; 20 months ago
- Fate: Merged into Chesapeake Energy
- Successor: Expand Energy Corporation
- Headquarters: Spring, Texas, U.S.
- Key people: William J. Way, (CEO & President); Carl F. Giesler, Jr., CFO
- Products: Natural gas
- Production output: 4.573 billion cubic feet of natural gas equivalent per day (2023)
- Revenue: ▼US$6.522 billion (2023)
- Net income: ▼$1.557 billion (2023)
- Total assets: ▼$11.991 billion (2023)
- Total equity: ▲$5.888 billion (2023)
- Number of employees: 1,165 (2023)

Southwestern Energy Company was a natural gas exploration and production company organized in Delaware and headquartered in Spring, Texas. In October 2024, the company merged into Expand Energy.

The company's primary exploration and production activities were in the Appalachian Basin in Pennsylvania and West Virginia, as well as the Haynesville Shale. The company also controlled 2,518,519 net undeveloped acres in New Brunswick, Canada, subject to an indefinite moratorium on hydraulic fracturing.

As of December 31, 2023, the company had 19.660 trillion cubic feet of natural gas equivalent of estimated proved reserves, of which 77% was natural gas, 20% was natural gas liquids, and 3% was petroleum.

== History ==
The company traced its roots to Arkansas Western Gas Company, which was established in July 1929 as a subsidiary of Southern Union Gas Company of Dallas.

In 1985, the company acquired Mustang Fuel for $200 million in stock.

In 2013, the company acquired assets in the Marcellus Shale from Chesapeake Energy for $93 million.

In December 2014, the company acquired 413,000 net acres in the Upper Devonian, Marcellus and Utica shales in West Virginia and Southwest Pennsylvania from Chesapeake Energy for $5.375 billion.

In December 2018, the company sold its assets in the Fayetteville Shale for net proceeds of $1.65 billion.

In November 2021, the company acquired GEP Haynesville for $1.85 billion.

In October 2024, the company merged into Expand Energy.

== Controversies ==
=== Public opposition to hydraulic fracturing in New Brunswick, Canada ===
In 2003, shale gas was discovered in New Brunswick, Canada. The company received exclusive licenses from the Department of Energy and Resource Development to conduct an exploration program. However, after protests by local citizens, in 2015, the provincial government in New Brunswick imposed a moratorium on hydraulic fracturing, and in May 2016, the government announced that the moratorium would continue indefinitely.
