= Interfor Corporation =

Multinational lumber company based in Canada

- Traded as: TSX: IFP
- Industry: Lumber manufacturer
- Founded: May 6, 1963
- Headquarters: Vancouver, Canada
- Area served: Worldwide
- Key people: Ian Fillinger (President & CEO); Lawrence Sauder (Chair)
- Products: Forest Products
- Revenue: ▲$3.3 billion CAN (2022)
- Number of employees: 5200
- Website: www.interfor.com

Interfor Corporation is one of the largest lumber producers in the world. The company's sawmilling operations have a combined manufacturing capacity of over 4.7 billion board feet of lumber with sales to North America, Asia-Pacific and Europe. Interfor is based in Vancouver, BC and employs approximately 5000 people. In May 2014, Interfor opened its corporate office for the USA south-east region at Peachtree City, Georgia.

== History ==
- 1930s Began with a sawmill in Whonnock, BC.
- 1963 Incorporated as Yorkston Lumber Co.
- 1963 Name changed to Whonnock Lumber Co.
- 1967 Converted to a public company.
- 1967 Name changed to Whonnock Industries.
- 1976 Buy Adams Lake division
- 1979 Sauder Industries acquired a controlling interest in Interfor (later transferred to the Sauder family's Mountclair Investment Corporation holding company).
- 1988 Name changed to International Forest Products Ltd.
- 1991 Buy Hammond Division
- 1995 Buy Weldwood Operation
- 1996 Close Bay Lumber Operation
- 2000 Sell Flavelle Mill
- 2001 Buy Primex Mills
- 2001 Close Fraser Mill
- 2002 Close MacDonald Operation/Open Sumas Operation
- 2004 Close Squamish Operation
- 2005 Buy Crown Pacific Limited Partners
- 2005 Buy Floragon Forest Products Molalla Inc.
- 2005 Close Marysville and Field Operations
- 2006 Sell Saltar and MacKenzie Operations
- 2008 Buy Portac Inc.
- 2008 Close Queensborough Operations
- 2013 Buy Rayonier Wood Products Division
- 2013 Buy Keadle Lumber Enterprises Inc.
- 2014 Buy Tolleson Lumber Company
- 2014 Name changed to Interfor Corporation
- 2014 Close Forks/Beaver Operations
- 2014 Acquired properties from Simpson Lumber Company
- 2015 Buy Monticello Operation
- 2015 Close Tacoma Operation
- 2019 Close Hammond Operation
- 2020 Sell Gilchrist Operation
- 2021 Buy Summerville Operation
- 2022 Buy EACOM Timber - Eastern Canada Expansion
- 2022 Sell Acorn Division
- 2022 Buy Chaleur Forest Products

== Environmental Record ==
Interfor's woodlands and manufacturing operations have been independently certified to internationally recognized standards.

=== Old growth logging ===
In British Columbia's Great Bear Rainforest, Interfor is known to log the oldest and rarest cedar trees.

=== Manufacturing ===
All of Interfor's BC sawmills are Chain-of-Custody (CoC) certified. Chain-of-Custody (CoC) certification tracks logs from harvest through the manufacturing process. In BC, Interfor mills are independently certified to meet Program for Endorsement of Forest Certification (PEFC) and Sustainable Forestry Initiative (SFI) CoC certification requirements. Select Interfor mills meet Forest Stewardship Council® (FSC) CoC certification requirements. Interfor's Preston and Perry Mills in the United States are certified to the SFI fiber sourcing requirements.
