= PS Business Parks =

American real estate company

PS Business Parks, Inc.
- Company type: Private
- Traded as: NYSE: PSB
- Industry: Real estate investment trust
- Founded: 1990; 35 years ago
- Defunct: July 20, 2022
- Fate: Acquired by Blackstone Inc.
- Headquarters: Glendale, California, U.S.
- Key people: Mac Chandler (CEO); Ronald L. Havner, Jr. (Chairman)
- Products: Real Estate
- Revenue: ▲US$483.70 million (2021)
- Net income: ▲US$393.09 million (2021)
- Total assets: ▲US$1.99 billion (2021)
- Total equity: ▲US$2.12 billion (2021)
- Number of employees: 155 (2019)
- Website: www.psbusinessparks.com

PS Business Parks, Inc., was a publicly traded real estate investment trust that acquired, developed, owned and operated commercial properties, primarily multi-tenant industrial, flex and office space. Located primarily in major coastal markets, PS Business Parks’ 97 properties served approximately 5,000 tenants, in 28 million square feet across California, Texas, Virginia, Florida, Maryland and Washington state. The portfolio also included 800 residential units (inclusive of units in-process) in Tysons, Virginia. As of July 20, 2022, PS Business Parks, Inc.'s holdings have been transferred to Link Logistics Real Estate, an affiliate of Blackstone Real Estate. completing an acquisition first announced on April 25, 2022.

== History ==
The company was formed in 1990 as a division of Public Storage.

In 1998, the company was spun-off from its parent.

In 2002, the company acquired Metro Park North, a 17-building business park in Rockville, Maryland for $125 million.

In 2011, the company purchased a 5.34 million-square-foot industrial and flex portfolio in Northern California from a subsidiary of Deutsche Bank for $520 million.

In 2018, the company acquired a portfolio of industrial properties in Northern Virginia for $143 million.
