= WPX Energy =

Former U.S. energy company

WPX Energy, Inc.
- Industry: Petroleum industry
- Founded: 2011; 14 years ago
- Defunct: January 7, 2021; 4 years ago
- Fate: Acquired by Devon Energy
- Headquarters: Tulsa, Oklahoma, U.S.
- Key people: Richard E. Muncrief, Chairman & CEO; J. Kevin Vann, CFO
- Products: Petroleum; Natural gas Natural gas liquids
- Production output: 166.9 thousand barrels of oil equivalent (1,021,000 GJ) per day (2019)
- Revenue: ▼US$2.292 billion (2019)
- Net income: ▲US$0.256 billion (2019)
- Total assets: ▲US$8.413 billion (2019)
- Total equity: ▲US$4.515 billion (2019)
- Number of employees: 590 (2019)

WPX Energy, Inc. (Williams Production and Exploration) was a company engaged in hydrocarbon exploration. It was organized in Delaware and headquartered in Tulsa, Oklahoma. In 2021, the company merged with Devon Energy.

All of the company's assets were in either the Williston Basin (42% of 2019 production) or the Permian Basin (58% of 2019 production). Of the company's total 2019 average production of 166.9 barrels of oil equivalent (1,021 GJ) per day, 62% was petroleum, 16% was natural gas liquids, and 22% was natural gas. As of December 31, 2019, the company had 527.559 million barrels of oil equivalent (3.22753×10^{9} GJ) of proved reserves, of which 56% was petroleum, 21% was natural gas liquids, and 23% was natural gas.

== History ==
- In January 2012, the company completed the corporate spin-off from the Williams Companies and became a public company.
- In June 2014, the company sold a working interest in some of its wells in the Piceance Basin to Legacy Reserves LP for $355 million.
- In May 2015, the company sold Marcellus Shale marketing contracts for $200 million.
- In June 2015, the company acquired 14,300 net acres in the Gallup, New Mexico oil window of the San Juan Basin for $26 million.
- In August 2015, the company acquired RKI Exploration & Production, LLC, giving it assets in the Permian Basin.
- In September 2015, the company sold its remaining mature coalbed methane properties in Wyoming's Powder River Basin for $80 million.
- In October 2015, the company sold its assets in Argentina for $294 million.
- In March 2016, the company sold its San Juan Basin gathering system for $309 million.
- In April 2016, the company sold its assets in the Piceance Basin to Terra Energy Partners for $911 million.
- In January 2017, the company acquired assets in the Permian Basin for $775 million.
- In 2018, the company sold its assets in the San Juan Basin for $775 million.
- In January 2021, the company merged with Devon Energy.
