= Insperity =

American human resource management company

Coordinates: 30.049814°N 95.250170°W

Insperity, Inc.
- Type: Public
- Traded as: NYSE: NSP; S&P 600 component
- Industry: Professional services
- Headquarters: Houston, Texas, United States
- Services: Human resources
- Revenue: ▲US$6.81 billion (FY 2025)
- Number of employees: 4,200 (2026)
- Website: www.insperity.com

Insperity, Inc., previously known as Administaff, Inc., is a professional employer organization (PEO) headquartered in Kingwood, an area of Houston, Texas, USA. Insperity provides human resources and administrative services to small and medium-sized businesses. Since 2004, the company has been title sponsor of a professional golf tournament on the Champions Tour, previously known as the Administaff Small Business Classic.

Insperity is publicly traded on the New York Stock Exchange under the ticker symbol NSP. The company completed its initial public offering in January 1997.

== History ==
Paul Sarvadi and Gerald McIntosh founded the business as Administaff in 1986 in Kingwood, in the Houston area. The present Delaware corporation was separately incorporated in 1995 under the name Administaff of Delaware, Inc. Administaff completed an initial public offering in 1997.

In 2011, Administaff changed its name to Insperity. The company later expanded its HR technology offerings through a partnership with Workday, announced in 2024, to develop a combined human resources service and software offering for small and midsize businesses.
