= S&P 400 =

American mid-cap stock market index

- Foundation: June 19, 1991; 35 years ago
- Operator: S&P Dow Jones Indices
- Exchanges: NYSE; Nasdaq
- Trading symbol: MID; ^MID; SP400; ^SP400
- Constituents: 400
- Type: Mid-cap
- Market cap: US$2.9 trillion (December 31, 2025)
- Weighting method: Free-float capitalization-weighted
- Related indices: List: S&P 1500
- Website: spglobal.com/sp-400

Global Industry Classification Standard of components of the S&P 400 by market capitalization as of August 12, 2026.
1. Information Technology (14.7%)
2. Financials (15.2%)
3. Communication Services (1.55%)
4. Consumer Discretionary (10.1%)
5. Healthcare (10.1%)
6. Industrials (24.8%)
7. Consumer Staples (3.26%)
8. Energy (4.78%)
9. Utilities (2.95%)
10. Real Estate (6.53%)
11. Materials (5.83%)
Contribution of component indices to S&P 1500 market cap as of August 31, 2026
1. (92.3%) S&P 500: 68,828,211.97
2. (5.08%) S&P MidCap 400: 3,788,135.2
3. (2.61%) S&P SmallCap 600: 1,942,867.17
Values are in US$ millions.

The S&P 400 (S&P MidCap 400 or Standard and Poor's 400) is a stock market index tracking the stock performance of 400 companies listed on stock exchanges in the United States that are considered to have medium market capitalizations. The S&P 400 is a subset of the S&P 1500. It is maintained by S&P Dow Jones Indices and its components are selected by a committee. For a list of the criteria for addition to the index, see S&P 1500 § Selection criteria.

The index is a public-float-weighted/capitalization-weighted index. The index includes approximately 5% of the total market capitalization of U.S. public companies, with an aggregate market capitalization of more than $2.9 trillion as of December 31, 2025. The median market capitalization of the components of the index is $7.9 billion and components range in market capitalization from $1.5 billion to $33.6 billion.

Products linked to the S&P 400 include index funds (exchange-traded funds/ETFs and mutual funds) as well as derivatives (options and futures contracts), which are available for trading in many countries with the goal of replicating the performance of the index. Also available are modified index funds; they replicate the performance of the index with modifications such as the use of covered call strategies, equal weighting, performance buffers, leverage, inclusion of only growth or value stocks, or exclusion of certain sectors, all with the goal of changing the risk/return and yield. In total, there was approximately $337 billion in assets tracking the index as of December 31, 2024.

The index is associated with many ticker symbols, including ^MID and ^SP400.

== Record values ==
Category	All-Time Highs	
Closing	3,592.93	Monday, February 9, 2026
Intraday	3,620.99	Wednesday, February 11, 2026

== Annual returns ==
Annual returns have been as follows:

Year	Price return (excluding dividends)	Total return (including dividends)	Net total return (including dividends net of withholding tax)
2025	5.90%	7.50%	7.02%
2024	12.20%	13.93%	13.41%
2023	14.45%	16.44%	15.84%
2022	−14.48%	−13.06%	−13.49%
2021	23.21%	24.76%	24.29%
2020	11.81%	13.66%	13.10%
2019	24.05%	26.20%	25.55%
2018	−12.50%	−11.08%	−11.51%
2017	14.45%	16.24%	15.70%
2016	18.73%	20.74%	20.13%
2015	−3.71%	−2.18%	−2.64%
2014	8.19%	9.77%	9.29%
2013	31.57%	33.50%	32.92%
2012	16.07%	17.88%	17.33%
2011	−3.10%	−1.73%	−2.14%
2010	24.85%	26.64%	26.10%
2009	35.00%	37.38%	36.66%
2008	−37.28%	−36.23%	−36.55%
2007	6.69%	7.98%	N/A
2006	8.99%	10.32%	N/A
2005	11.27%	12.56%	N/A
2004	15.16%	16.48%	N/A

== See also ==
- List of S&P 400 companies
- Historical components of the S&P 400
- List of recessions in the United States
