= List of largest oil and gas companies by revenue =

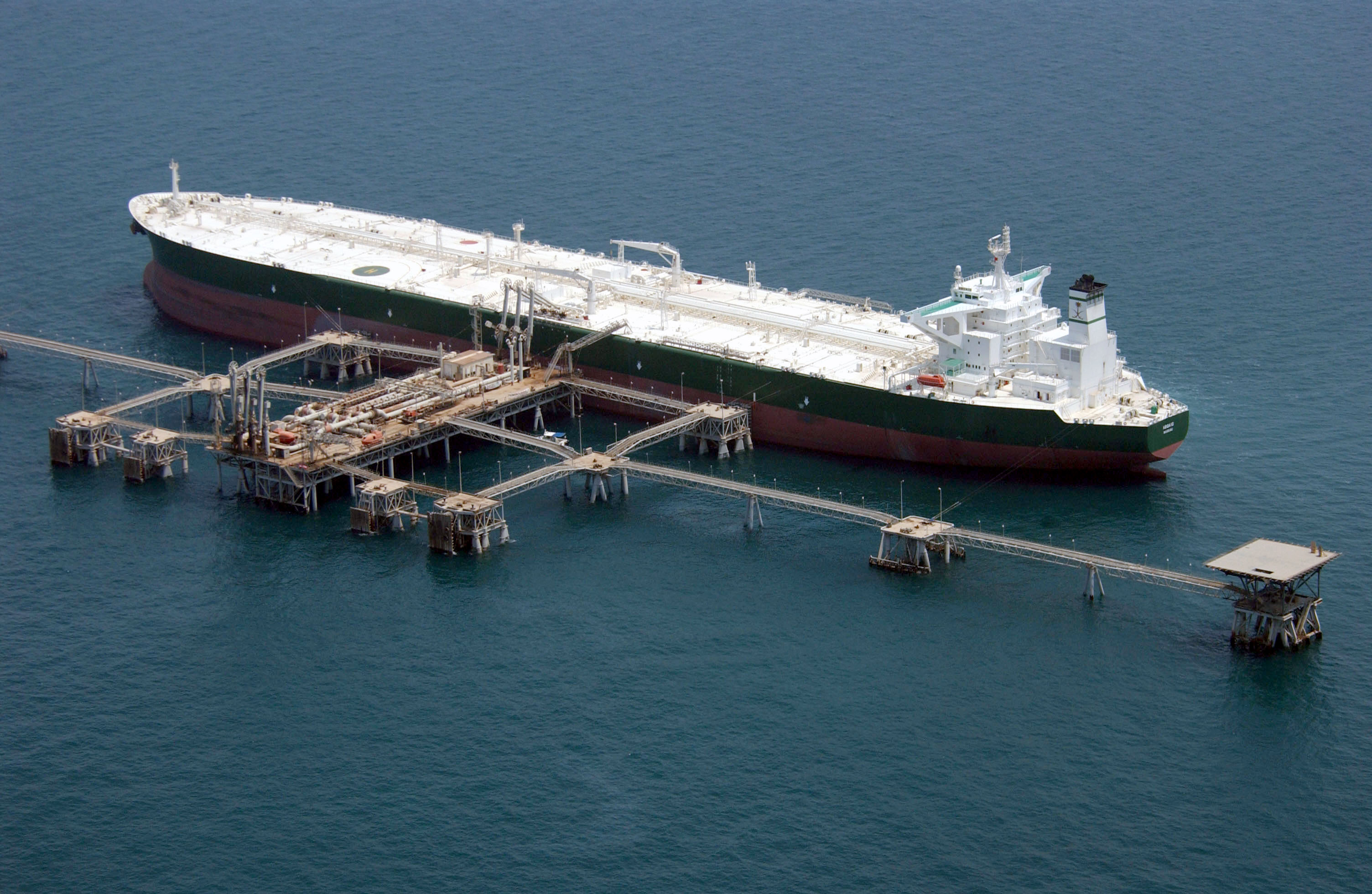
A commercial oil tanker receives oil at a terminal off Iraq.

Total revenue of oil and gas companies is listed in billions of U.S. dollars. Total revenue is usually self-reported by companies, and often reported by neutral, unbiased, reliable publications. Reported data may be subsequently revised or restated due to a wide range of issues such as exchange rates, contract settlements, or mid-year discontinuation of products or services. Fiscal years are for January 1 to December 31, except where noted. Empty cells indicate that no data for that year has been reported yet.

This list is partially sourced from the S&P Global Commodity Insights Top 250 Global Energy Company Rankings for 2022. The S&P Global list is restricted to publicly traded companies, and only integrated oil and gas, oil and gas exploration and production, oil and gas refining and marketing, and oil and gas storage and transportation companies were included on the list below. For state-owned oil corporations, the list below is also partially sourced from data provided by Statista and the Sovereign Wealth Fund Institute.

This list provides data for parent companies, not each subsidiary.

== Companies ==
Revenue in US$ billion
Company Name	Country	2018	2019	2020	2021	2022	2023
Sonatrach	Algeria	33.2	30.3	33.0	20.0	34.5	76.9
Sonangol Group	Angola	17.6 (Note: Sonangol Group reported 2017 revenues of Kz2.916 trillion. The yearly average exchange rate for Angolan kwanzas to U.S. dollars in 2017 was 0.006057, which equates to $17.6 billion in U.S. dollars.)	19.5 (Note: Sonangol Group reported 2018 revenues of Kz4.797 trillion. The yearly average exchange rate for Angolan kwanzas to U.S. dollars in 2018 was 0.004067, which equates to $19.5 billion in U.S. dollars.)	12.2 (Note: Sonangol Group reported 2019 revenues of Kz4.374 trillion. The yearly average exchange rate for Angolan kwanzas to U.S. dollars in 2019 was 0.002808, which equates to $12.2 billion in U.S. dollars.)	5.8 (Note: Sonangol Group reported 2020 revenues of Kz4.374 trillion. The yearly average exchange rate for Angolan kwanzas to U.S. dollars in 2020 was 0.001745, which equates to $5.8 billion in U.S. dollars.)	8.5	14.4 (Note: Sonangol Group reported 2022 revenues of Kz6.233 trillion. The yearly average exchange rate for Angolan kwanzas to U.S. dollars in 2022 was 0.00232, which equates to $14.4 billion in U.S. dollars.)
YPF	Argentina	15.3 (Note: YPF reported 2017 revenues of ARS$252.813 billion. The yearly average exchange rate for Argentine pesos to U.S. dollars in 2017 was 0.0606, which equates to $15.3 billion in U.S. dollars.)	16.6 (Note: YPF reported 2018 revenues of ARS$435.820 billion. The yearly average exchange rate for Argentine pesos to U.S. dollars in 2018 was 0.0382, which equates to $16.6 billion in U.S. dollars.)	14.5 (Note: YPF reported 2019 revenues of ARS$678.595 billion. The yearly average exchange rate for Argentine pesos to U.S. dollars in 2019 was 0.0214, which equates to $14.5 billion in U.S. dollars.)	9.5 (Note: YPF reported 2020 revenues of ARS$669.186 billion. The yearly average exchange rate for Argentine pesos to U.S. dollars in 2020 was 0.0143, which equates to $9.5 billion in U.S. dollars.)	13.3 (Note: YPF reported 2021 revenues of ARS$1.271 trillion. The yearly average exchange rate for Argentine pesos to U.S. dollars in 2021 was 0.0105, which equates to $13.3 billion in U.S. dollars.)	18.7
APA Group	Australia	1.9 (Note: APA Group's fiscal year runs from 1 July to 30 June. The revenues for 2017 are therefore for the fiscal year which ran 1 July 2016 to 30 June 2017.) (Note: APA Group reported 2017 revenues of AUD$2.508 billion. The yearly average exchange rate for Australian dollars to U.S. dollars in 2017 was 0.7669, which equates to $1.9 billion in U.S. dollars.)	1.9 (Note: APA Group's fiscal year runs from 1 July to 30 June. The revenues for 2018 are therefore for the fiscal year which ran 1 July 2017 to 30 June 2018.) (Note: APA Group reported 2018 revenues of AUD$2.635 billion. The yearly average exchange rate for Australian dollars to U.S. dollars in 2018 was 0.7475, which equates to $1.9 billion in U.S. dollars.)	1.6 (Note: APA Group's fiscal year runs from 1 July to 30 June. The revenues for 2019 are therefore for the fiscal year which ran 1 July 2018 to 30 June 2019.) (Note: APA Group reported 2019 revenues of AUD$2.428 billion. The yearly average exchange rate for Australian dollars to U.S. dollars in 2019 was 0.6954, which equates to $1.6 billion in U.S. dollars.)	1.7 (Note: APA Group's fiscal year runs from 1 July to 30 June. The revenues for 2020 are therefore for the fiscal year which ran 1 July 2019 to 30 June 2020.) (Note: APA Group reported 2020 revenues of AUD$2.559 billion. The yearly average exchange rate for Australian dollars to U.S. dollars in 2020 was 0.6906, which equates to $1.7 billion in U.S. dollars.)	1.9 (Note: APA Group's fiscal year runs from 1 July to 30 June. The revenues for 2021 are therefore for the fiscal year which ran 1 July 2020 to 30 June 2021.) (Note: APA Group reported 2021 revenues of AUD$2.575 billion. The yearly average exchange rate for Australian dollars to U.S. dollars in 2021 was 0.7111, which equates to $1.9 billion in U.S. dollars.)	2.0 (Note: APA Group's fiscal year runs from 1 July to 30 June. The revenues for 2022 are therefore for the fiscal year which ran 1 July 2021 to 30 June 2022.) (Note: APA Group reported 2022 revenues of AUD$2.913 billion. The yearly average exchange rate for Australian dollars to U.S. dollars in 2022 was 0.6948, which equates to $2.0 billion in U.S. dollars.)
Origin Energy	Australia	10.6 (Note: Origin Energy's fiscal year runs from 1 July to 30 June. The revenues for 2017 are therefore for the fiscal year which ran 1 July 2016 to 30 June 2017.) (Note: Origin Energy reported 2017 revenues of AUD$13.833 billion. The yearly average exchange rate for Australian dollars to U.S. dollars in 2017 was 0.7669, which equates to $10.6 billion in U.S. dollars.)	10.9 (Note: Origin Energy's fiscal year runs from 1 July to 30 June. The revenues for 2018 are therefore for the fiscal year which ran 1 July 2017 to 30 June 2018.) (Note: Origin Energy reported 2018 revenues of AUD$14.604 billion. The yearly average exchange rate for Australian dollars to U.S. dollars in 2018 was 0.7475, which equates to $10.9 billion in U.S. dollars.)	10.2 (Note: Origin Energy's fiscal year runs from 1 July to 30 June. The revenues for 2019 are therefore for the fiscal year which ran 1 July 2018 to 30 June 2019.) (Note: Origin Energy reported 2019 revenues of AUD$14.727 billion. The yearly average exchange rate for Australian dollars to U.S. dollars in 2019 was 0.6954, which equates to $10.2 billion in U.S. dollars.)	9.0 (Note: Origin Energy's fiscal year runs from 1 July to 30 June. The revenues for 2020 are therefore for the fiscal year which ran 1 July 2019 to 30 June 2020.) (Note: Origin Energy reported 2020 revenues of AUD$13.157 billion. The yearly average exchange rate for Australian dollars to U.S. dollars in 2020 was 0.6906, which equates to $9.0 billion in U.S. dollars.)	9.0 (Note: Origin Energy's fiscal year runs from 1 July to 30 June. The revenues for 2021 are therefore for the fiscal year which ran 1 July 2020 to 30 June 2021.) (Note: Origin Energy reported 2021 revenues of AUD$12.097 billion. The yearly average exchange rate for Australian dollars to U.S. dollars in 2021 was 0.7111, which equates to $9.0 billion in U.S. dollars.)	11.4 (Note: Origin Energy's fiscal year runs from 1 July to 30 June. The revenues for 2022 are therefore for the fiscal year which ran 1 July 2021 to 30 June 2022.) (Note: Origin Energy reported 2022 revenues of AUD$16.526 billion. The yearly average exchange rate for Australian dollars to U.S. dollars in 2022 was 0.6948, which equates to $11.4 billion in U.S. dollars.)
Santos	Australia	3.1	3.7	4.1	3.5	4.8	7.8
Woodside Energy	Australia	3.9	5.2	4.8	3.6	6.9	16.8
OMV Group	Austria	22.8 (Note: OMV Group reported 2017 revenues of €20.222 billion. The yearly average exchange rate for euros to U.S. dollars in 2017 was 1.1304, which equates to $22.8 billion in U.S. dollars.)	27.9 (Note: OMV Group reported 2018 revenues of €22.93 billion. The yearly average exchange rate for euros to U.S. dollars in 2018 was 1.1811, which equates to $27.0 billion in U.S. dollars.)	26.2 (Note: OMV Group reported 2019 revenues of €23.461 billion. The yearly average exchange rate for euros to U.S. dollars in 2019 was 1.1199, which equates to $26.2 billion in U.S. dollars.)	18.9 (Note: OMV Group reported 2020 revenues of €16.55 billion. The yearly average exchange rate for euros to U.S. dollars in 2020 was 1.142, which equates to $18.9 billion in U.S. dollars.)	42.0 (Note: OMV Group reported 2021 revenues of €35.555 billion. The yearly average exchange rate for euros to U.S. dollars in 2021 was 1.183, which equates to $42.0 billion in U.S. dollars.)	68.2 (Note: OMV Group reported 2021 revenues of €64.811 billion. The yearly average exchange rate for euros to U.S. dollars in 2022 was 1.0538, which equates to $68.2 billion in U.S. dollars.)
SOCAR	Azerbaijan	53.8 (Note: SOCAR reported 2017 revenues of ₼92.6 billion. The yearly average exchange rate for Azerbaijani manat to U.S. dollars in 2017 was 0.581369, which equates to $53.8 billion in U.S. dollars.)	65.3 (Note: SOCAR reported 2018 revenues of ₼111.2 billion. The yearly average exchange rate for Azerbaijani manat to U.S. dollars in 2018 was 0.587736, which equates to $65.3 billion in U.S. dollars.)	49.1 (Note: SOCAR reported 2019 revenues of ₼83.8 billion. The yearly average exchange rate for Azerbaijani manat to U.S. dollars in 2019 was 0.586953, which equates to $49.1 billion in U.S. dollars.)	23.2 (Note: SOCAR reported 2020 revenues of ₼39.607 billion. The yearly average exchange rate for Azerbaijani manat to U.S. dollars in 2020 was 0.588038, which equates to $23.2 billion in U.S. dollars.)	45.5	70.0 (Note: SOCAR reported 2022 revenues of ₼119.288 billion. The yearly average exchange rate for Azerbaijani manat to U.S. dollars in 2022 was 0.586865, which equates to $70.0 billion in U.S. dollars.)
nogaholding	Bahrain	6.0 (Note: nogaholding reported 2017 revenues of BD2.307 billion. The yearly average exchange rate for Bahraini dinars to U.S. dollars in 2017 was 2.6377, which equates to $6.0 billion in U.S. dollars.)	7.4 (Note: nogaholding reported 2018 revenues of BD2.857 billion. The yearly average exchange rate for Bahraini dinars to U.S. dollars in 2018 was 2.6179, which equates to $7.4 billion in U.S. dollars.)	7.0 (Note: nogaholding reported 2019 revenues of BD2.670 billion. The yearly average exchange rate for Bahraini dinars to U.S. dollars in 2019 was 2.6527, which equates to $7.0 billion in U.S. dollars.)	4.3 (Note: nogaholding reported 2020 revenues of BD1.643 billion. The yearly average exchange rate for Bahraini dinars to U.S. dollars in 2020 was 2.6513, which equates to $4.3 billion in U.S. dollars.)	6.8 (Note: nogaholding reported 2021 revenues of BD2.599 billion. The yearly average exchange rate for Bahraini dinars to U.S. dollars in 2021 was 2.6525, which equates to $6.8 billion in U.S. dollars.)	11.1 (Note: nogaholding reported 2022 revenues of BD4.208 billion. The yearly average exchange rate for Bahraini dinars to U.S. dollars in 2022 was 2.6525, which equates to $11.1 billion in U.S. dollars.)
Bangladesh Petroleum Corporation	Bangladesh			5.8 (Note: Bangladesh Petroleum Corporation's fiscal year runs from 1 July to 30 June. The revenues for 2019 are therefore for the fiscal year which ran 1 July 2018 to 30 June 2019.) (Note: Bangladesh Petroleum Corporation reported 2018-2019 revenues of ৳491.619 billion. The yearly average exchange rate for Bangladeshi taka to U.S. dollars in 2019 was 0.0118, which equates to $5.8 billion in U.S. dollars.)	5.8 (Note: Bangladesh Petroleum Corporation's fiscal year runs from 1 July to 30 June. The revenues for 2020 are therefore for the fiscal year which ran 1 July 2019 to 30 June 2020.) (Note: Bangladesh Petroleum Corporation reported 2019-2020 revenues of ৳499.077 billion. The yearly average exchange rate for Bangladeshi taka to U.S. dollars in 2020 was 0.0118, which equates to $5.8 billion in U.S. dollars.)	4.6 (Note: Bangladesh Petroleum Corporation's fiscal year runs from 1 July to 30 June. The revenues for 2021 are therefore for the fiscal year which ran 1 July 2020 to 30 June 2021.) (Note: Bangladesh Petroleum Corporation reported 2020-2021 revenues of ৳395.108 billion. The yearly average exchange rate for Bangladeshi taka to U.S. dollars in 2021 was 0.0118, which equates to $4.6 billion in U.S. dollars.)	5.7 (Note: Bangladesh Petroleum Corporation's fiscal year runs from 1 July to 30 June. The revenues for 2022 are therefore for the fiscal year which ran 1 July 2021 to 30 June 2022.) (Note: Bangladesh Petroleum Corporation reported 2021-2022 revenues of ৳535.755 billion. The yearly average exchange rate for Bangladeshi taka to U.S. dollars in 2022 was 0.0108, which equates to $5.7 billion in U.S. dollars.)
Petrobangla	Bangladesh	0.5 (Note: Petrobangla's fiscal year runs from 1 July to 30 June. The revenues for 2017 are therefore for the fiscal year which ran 1 July 2016 to 30 June 2017.) (Note: Petrobangla reported 2016-2017 revenues of ৳45.934 billion. The yearly average exchange rate for Bangladeshi taka to U.S. dollars in 2017 was 0.0123, which equates to $0.5 billion in U.S. dollars.)	0.5 (Note: Petrobangla's fiscal year runs from 1 July to 30 June. The revenues for 2018 are therefore for the fiscal year which ran 1 July 2017 to 30 June 2018.) (Note: Petrobangla reported 2017-2018 revenues of ৳48.257 billion. The yearly average exchange rate for Bangladeshi taka to U.S. dollars in 2018 was 0.0119, which equates to $0.5 billion in U.S. dollars.)	1.8 (Note: Petrobangla's fiscal year runs from 1 July to 30 June. The revenues for 2019 are therefore for the fiscal year which ran 1 July 2018 to 30 June 2019.) (Note: Petrobangla reported 2018-2019 revenues of ৳153.284 billion. The yearly average exchange rate for Bangladeshi taka to U.S. dollars in 2019 was 0.0118, which equates to $1.8 billion in U.S. dollars.)	6.8 (Note: Petrobangla's fiscal year runs from 1 July to 30 June. The revenues for 2020 are therefore for the fiscal year which ran 1 July 2019 to 30 June 2020.) (Note: Petrobangla reported 2019-2020 revenues of ৳578.252 billion. The yearly average exchange rate for Bangladeshi taka to U.S. dollars in 2020 was 0.0118, which equates to $6.8 billion in U.S. dollars.)	6.6 (Note: Petrobangla's fiscal year runs from 1 July to 30 June. The revenues for 2021 are therefore for the fiscal year which ran 1 July 2020 to 30 June 2021.) (Note: Petrobangla reported 2020-2021 revenues of ৳562.736 billion. The yearly average exchange rate for Bangladeshi taka to U.S. dollars in 2021 was 0.0118, which equates to $6.6 billion in U.S. dollars.)	
Belneftekhim	Belarus	12.7					
YPFB	Bolivia	5.6 (Note: YPFB reported 2017 revenues of Bs30.465 billion. The yearly average exchange rate for Bolivian bolivianos to U.S. dollars in 2017 was 0.1442, which equates to $5.6 billion in U.S. dollars.)	6.5 (Note: YPFB reported 2018 revenues of Bs45.059 billion. The yearly average exchange rate for Bolivian bolivianos to U.S. dollars in 2018 was 0.1447, which equates to $6.5 billion in U.S. dollars.)	6.2 (Note: YPFB reported 2019 revenues of Bs43.258 billion. The yearly average exchange rate for Bolivian bolivianos to U.S. dollars in 2019 was 0.1447, which equates to $6.2 billion in U.S. dollars.)	4.6 (Note: YPFB reported 2020 revenues of Bs32.0 billion. The yearly average exchange rate for Bolivian bolivianos to U.S. dollars in 2020 was 0.1440, which equates to $4.6 billion in U.S. dollars.)	5.9	8.1 (Note: YPFB reported 2022 revenues of Bs56.281 billion. The yearly average exchange rate for Bolivian bolivianos to U.S. dollars in 2022 was 0.1451, which equates to $8.1 billion in U.S. dollars.)
Petrobras	Brazil	77.8 (Note: 2017 income was restated.)	84.6 (Note: 2018 income was restated.)	76.5	53.6	83.9	124.4
Ultrapar	Brazil	24.8 (Note: Ultrapar reported 2017 revenues of R$79.23 billion. The yearly average exchange rate for Brazilian reals to U.S. dollars in 2017 was 0.3134, which equates to $24.8 billion in U.S. dollars.)	24.9 (Note: Ultrapar reported 2018 revenues of R$90.697 billion. The yearly average exchange rate for Brazilian reals to U.S. dollars in 2018 was 0.2755, which equates to $24.9 billion in U.S. dollars.)	22.6 (Note: Ultrapar reported 2019 revenues of R$89.297 billion. The yearly average exchange rate for Brazilian reals to U.S. dollars in 2019 was 0.2538, which equates to $22.6 billion in U.S. dollars.)	15.9 (Note: Ultrapar reported 2020 revenues of R$81.241 billion. The yearly average exchange rate for Brazilian reals to U.S. dollars in 2020 was 0.1958, which equates to $15.9 billion in U.S. dollars.)	22.0 (Note: Ultrapar reported 2021 revenues of R$118.799 billion. The yearly average exchange rate for Brazilian reals to U.S. dollars in 2021 was 0.1855, which equates to $22.0 billion in U.S. dollars.)	27.8 (Note: Ultrapar reported 2022 revenues of R$143.634 billion. The yearly average exchange rate for Brazilian reals to U.S. dollars in 2022 was 0.194, which equates to $27.8 billion in U.S. dollars.)
Brunei Energy Services and Trading	Brunei	1.8 (Note: Brunei National Petroleum Company reported 2017 revenues of B$2.583 billion. The yearly average exchange rate for Brunei dollars to U.S. dollars in 2017 was 0.7247, which equates to $1.8 billion in U.S. dollars.)	2.1 (Note: Brunei National Petroleum Company reported 2018 revenues of B$2.975 billion. The yearly average exchange rate for Brunei dollars to U.S. dollars in 2018 was 0.7132, which equates to $2.1 billion in U.S. dollars.)	3.5 (Note: Brunei National Petroleum Company reported 2019 revenues of B$4.873 billion. The yearly average exchange rate for Brunei dollars to U.S. dollars in 2019 was 0.729, which equates to $3.5 billion in U.S. dollars.)	2.6 (Note: Brunei National Petroleum Company reported 2020 revenues of B$3.645 billion. The yearly average exchange rate for Brunei dollars to U.S. dollars in 2020 was 0.7253, which equates to $2.6 billion in U.S. dollars.)	0.9 (Note: Brunei National Petroleum Company reported 2021 revenues of B$1.241 billion. The yearly average exchange rate for Brunei dollars to U.S. dollars in 2021 was 0.7443, which equates to $0.9 billion in U.S. dollars.)	
Bulgarian Energy Holding	Bulgaria	3.2 (Note: Bulgarian Energy Holding reported 2017 revenues of BGN6.106 billion. The yearly average exchange rate for Bulgarian lev to U.S. dollars in 2017 was 0.5321, which equates to $3.2 billion in U.S. dollars.)	4.2 (Note: Bulgarian Energy Holding reported 2018 revenues of BGN6.959 billion. The yearly average exchange rate for Bulgarian lev to U.S. dollars in 2018 was 0.6038, which equates to $4.2 billion in U.S. dollars.)	4.1 (Note: Bulgarian Energy Holding reported 2019 revenues of BGN7.294 billion. The yearly average exchange rate for Bulgarian lev to U.S. dollars in 2019 was 0.5724, which equates to $4.1 billion in U.S. dollars.)	3.6 (Note: Bulgarian Energy Holding reported 2020 revenues of BGN6.188 billion. The yearly average exchange rate for Bulgarian lev to U.S. dollars in 2020 was 0.5837, which equates to $3.6 billion in U.S. dollars.)	6.8 (Note: Bulgarian Energy Holding reported 2021 revenues of BGN11.2 billion. The yearly average exchange rate for Bulgarian lev to U.S. dollars in 2021 was 0.6048, which equates to $6.8 billion in U.S. dollars.)	10.8 (Note: Bulgarian Energy Holding reported 2022 revenues of BGN20.160 billion. The yearly average exchange rate for Bulgarian lev to U.S. dollars in 2022 was 0.5837, which equates to $10.8 billion in U.S. dollars.)
AltaGas	Canada	1.9 (Note: AltaGas reported 2017 revenues of CAN$2.556 billion. The yearly average exchange rate for Canadian dollars to U.S. dollars in 2017 was 0.7713, which equates to $1.9 billion in U.S. dollars.)	3.2 (Note: ARC Resources reported 2018 revenues of CAN$4.256 billion. The yearly average exchange rate for Canadian dollars to U.S. dollars in 2018 was 0.7717, which equates to $3.2 billion in U.S. dollars.)	4.1 (Note: AltaGas reported 2019 revenues of CAN$5.495 billion. The yearly average exchange rate for Canadian dollars to U.S. dollars in 2019 was 0.7538, which equates to $4.1 billion in U.S. dollars.)	4.1 (Note: AltaGas reported 2020 revenues of CAN$5.587 billion. The yearly average exchange rate for Canadian dollars to U.S. dollars in 2020 was 0.7462, which equates to $4.1 billion in U.S. dollars.)	8.4 (Note: AltaGas reported 2021 revenues of CAN$10.573 billion. The yearly average exchange rate for Canadian dollars to U.S. dollars in 2021 was 0.7978, which equates to $8.4 billion in U.S. dollars.)	10.8 (Note: Alta Gas reported 2022 revenues of CAN$14.087 billion. The yearly average exchange rate for Canadian dollars to U.S. dollars in 2022 was 0.7688, which equates to $10.8 billion in U.S. dollars.)
ARC Resources	Canada	0.8 (Note: ARC Resourcesreported 2017 revenues of CAN$1.122 billion. The yearly average exchange rate for Canadian dollars to U.S. dollars in 2017 was 0.7713, which equates to $0.8 billion in U.S. dollars.)	1.0 (Note: ARC Resources reported 2018 revenues of CAN$1.390 billion. The yearly average exchange rate for Canadian dollars to U.S. dollars in 2018 was 0.7717, which equates to $1.0 billion in U.S. dollars.)	0.9 (Note: ARC Resources reported 2019 revenues of CAN$1.214 billion. The yearly average exchange rate for Canadian dollars to U.S. dollars in 2019 was 0.7538, which equates to $0.9 billion in U.S. dollars.)	0.8 (Note: ARC Resources reported 2020 revenues of CAN$1.125 billion. The yearly average exchange rate for Canadian dollars to U.S. dollars in 2020 was 0.7462, which equates to $0.8 billion in U.S. dollars.)	4.0 (Note: ARC Resources reported 2021 revenues of CAN$5.110 billion. The yearly average exchange rate for Canadian dollars to U.S. dollars in 2021 was 0.7978, which equates to $4.0 billion in U.S. dollars.)	6.6 (Note: ARC Resources reported 2022 revenues of CAN$8.641 billion. The yearly average exchange rate for Canadian dollars to U.S. dollars in 2022 was 0.7688, which equates to $6.6 billion in U.S. dollars.)
Brookfield Infrastructure Partners	Canada	0.0 (Note: Brookfield Infrastructure Partners reported energy revenues of just $92 million in 2017.)	0.3	1.2	0.2	1.1	14.4
Canadian Natural Resources	Canada	14.1 (Note: Canadian Natural reported 2017 revenues of CAN$18.360 billion. The yearly average exchange rate for Canadian dollars to U.S. dollars in 2017 was 0.7713, which equates to $14.1 billion in U.S. dollars.)	17.1 (Note: Canadian Natural reported 2018 revenues of CAN$22.282 billion. The yearly average exchange rate for Canadian dollars to U.S. dollars in 2018 was 0.7717, which equates to $17.1 billion in U.S. dollars.)	18.3 (Note: Canadian Natural reported 2019 revenues of CAN$24.394 billion. The yearly average exchange rate for Canadian dollars to U.S. dollars in 2019 was 0.7538, which equates to $18.3 billion in U.S. dollars.)	13.0 (Note: Canadian Natural reported 2020 revenues of CAN$17.491 billion. The yearly average exchange rate for Canadian dollars to U.S. dollars in 2020 was 0.7462, which equates to $13.0 billion in U.S. dollars.)	26.2 (Note: Canadian Natural reported 2021 revenues of CAN$32.854 billion. The yearly average exchange rate for Canadian dollars to U.S. dollars in 2021 was 0.7978, which equates to $26.2 billion in U.S. dollars.)	32.5 (Note: Canadian Natural reported 2022 revenues of CAN$42.298 billion. The yearly average exchange rate for Canadian dollars to U.S. dollars in 2022 was 0.7688, which equates to $32.5 billion in U.S. dollars.)
Crescent Point Energy	Canada	2.5 (Note: Crescent Point Energy reported 2017 revenues of CAN$3.303 billion. The yearly average exchange rate for Canadian dollars to U.S. dollars in 2017 was 0.7713, which equates to $2.5 billion in U.S. dollars.)	2.9 (Note: Crescent Point Energy reported 2018 revenues of CAN$3.887 billion. The yearly average exchange rate for Canadian dollars to U.S. dollars in 2018 was 0.7717, which equates to $2.9 billion in U.S. dollars.)	2.5 (Note: Crescent Point Energy reported 2019 revenues of CAN$3.336 billion. The yearly average exchange rate for Canadian dollars to U.S. dollars in 2019 was 0.7538, which equates to $2.5 billion in U.S. dollars.)	1.2 (Note: Crescent Point Energy reported 2020 revenues of CAN$1.692 billion. The yearly average exchange rate for Canadian dollars to U.S. dollars in 2020 was 0.7462, which equates to $1.2 billion in U.S. dollars.)	2.5 (Note: Crescent Point Energy reported 2021 revenues of CAN$3.206 billion. The yearly average exchange rate for Canadian dollars to U.S. dollars in 2021 was 0.7978, which equates to $2.5 billion in U.S. dollars.)	3.4 (Note: Crescent Point Energy reported 2022 revenues of CAN$4.493 billion. The yearly average exchange rate for Canadian dollars to U.S. dollars in 2022 was 0.7688, which equates to $3.4 billion in U.S. dollars.)
Cenovus Energy	Canada	13.3 (Note: Cenovus Energy reported 2017 revenues of CAN$17.314 billion. The yearly average exchange rate for Canadian dollars to U.S. dollars in 2017 was 0.7713, which equates to $13.3 billion in U.S. dollars.)	16.5 (Note: Cenovus Energy reported 2018 revenues of CAN$21.389 billion. The yearly average exchange rate for Canadian dollars to U.S. dollars in 2018 was 0.7717, which equates to $16.5 billion in U.S. dollars.)	16.3 (Note: Cenovus Energy reported 2019 revenues of CAN$21.715 billion. The yearly average exchange rate for Canadian dollars to U.S. dollars in 2019 was 0.7538, which equates to $16.3 billion in U.S. dollars.)	10.3 (Note: Cenovus Energy reported 2020 revenues of CAN$13.914 billion. The yearly average exchange rate for Canadian dollars to U.S. dollars in 2020 was 0.7462, which equates to $10.3 billion in U.S. dollars.)	38.9 (Note: Cenovus Energy reported 2021 revenues of CAN$48.811 billion. The yearly average exchange rate for Canadian dollars to U.S. dollars in 2021 was 0.7978, which equates to $38.9 billion in U.S. dollars.)	55.1 (Note: Cenovus Energy reported 2022 revenues of CAN$71.765 billion. The yearly average exchange rate for Canadian dollars to U.S. dollars in 2022 was 0.7688, which equates to $55.1 billion in U.S. dollars.)
Enbridge	Canada	34.2 (Note: Enbridge reported 2017 revenues of CAN$44.378 billion. The yearly average exchange rate for Canadian dollars to U.S. dollars in 2017 was 0.7713, which equates to $34.2 billion in U.S. dollars.)	35.7 (Note: Enbridge reported 2018 revenues of CAN$46.378 billion. The yearly average exchange rate for Canadian dollars to U.S. dollars in 2018 was 0.7717, which equates to $35.7 billion in U.S. dollars.)	37.7 (Note: Enbridge reported 2019 revenues of CAN$50.069 billion. The yearly average exchange rate for Canadian dollars to U.S. dollars in 2019 was 0.7538, which equates to $37.7 billion in U.S. dollars.)	29.1 (Note: Enbridge reported 2020 revenues of CAN$39.087 billion. The yearly average exchange rate for Canadian dollars to U.S. dollars in 2020 was 0.7462, which equates to $29.1 billion in U.S. dollars.)	37.5 (Note: Enbridge reported 2021 revenues of CAN$47.071 billion. The yearly average exchange rate for Canadian dollars to U.S. dollars in 2021 was 0.7978, which equates to $37.5 billion in U.S. dollars.)	40.9 (Note: Enbridge reported 2022 revenues of CAN$53.309 billion. The yearly average exchange rate for Canadian dollars to U.S. dollars in 2022 was 0.7688, which equates to $40.9 billion in U.S. dollars.)
Enerplus	Canada	0.7 (Note: Enerplus reported 2017 revenues of CAN$0.935 billion. The yearly average exchange rate for Canadian dollars to U.S. dollars in 2017 was 0.7713, which equates to $0.7 billion in U.S. dollars.)	1.0 (Note: Enerplus reported 2018 revenues of CAN$1.380 billion. The yearly average exchange rate for Canadian dollars to U.S. dollars in 2018 was 0.7717, which equates to $1.0 billion in U.S. dollars.)	0.8 (Note: Enerplus reported 2019 revenues of CAN$1.118 billion. The yearly average exchange rate for Canadian dollars to U.S. dollars in 2019 was 0.7538, which equates to $0.8 billion in U.S. dollars.)	0.6	1.2	2.1
Frontera Energy	Canada	0.9 (Note: Frontera Energy reported 2017 revenues of CAN$1.258 billion. The yearly average exchange rate for Canadian dollars to U.S. dollars in 2017 was 0.7713, which equates to $0.9 billion in U.S. dollars.)	1.0 (Note: Frontera Energy reported 2018 revenues of CAN$1.320 billion. The yearly average exchange rate for Canadian dollars to U.S. dollars in 2018 was 0.7717, which equates to $1.0 billion in U.S. dollars.)	1.0 (Note: Frontera Energy reported 2019 revenues of CAN$1.383 billion. The yearly average exchange rate for Canadian dollars to U.S. dollars in 2019 was 0.7538, which equates to $1.0 billion in U.S. dollars.)	0.4 (Note: Frontera Energy reported 2020 revenues of CAN$0.678 billion. The yearly average exchange rate for Canadian dollars to U.S. dollars in 2020 was 0.7462, which equates to $0.4 billion in U.S. dollars.)	0.7 (Note: Frontera Energy reported 2021 revenues of CAN$0.894 billion. The yearly average exchange rate for Canadian dollars to U.S. dollars in 2021 was 0.7978, which equates to $0.7 billion in U.S. dollars.)	1.2
Gibson Energy	Canada	4.3 (Note: Gibson Energy reported 2017 revenues of CAN$5.659 billion. The yearly average exchange rate for Canadian dollars to U.S. dollars in 2017 was 0.7713, which equates to $4.3 billion in U.S. dollars.)	5.2 (Note: Gibson Energy reported 2018 revenues of CAN$6.846 billion. The yearly average exchange rate for Canadian dollars to U.S. dollars in 2018 was 0.7717, which equates to $5.2 billion in U.S. dollars.)	5.5 (Note: Gibson Energy reported 2019 revenues of CAN$7.336 billion. The yearly average exchange rate for Canadian dollars to U.S. dollars in 2019 was 0.7538, which equates to $5.5 billion in U.S. dollars.)	3.6 (Note: Gibson Energy reported 2020 revenues of CAN$4.938 billion. The yearly average exchange rate for Canadian dollars to U.S. dollars in 2020 was 0.7462, which equates to $3.6 billion in U.S. dollars.)	5.7 (Note: Gibson Energy reported 2021 revenues of CAN$7.211 billion. The yearly average exchange rate for Canadian dollars to U.S. dollars in 2021 was 0.7978, which equates to $5.7 billion in U.S. dollars.)	8.4 (Note: Gibson Energy reported 2022 revenues of CAN$11.035 billion. The yearly average exchange rate for Canadian dollars to U.S. dollars in 2022 was 0.7688, which equates to $8.4 billion in U.S. dollars.)
Inter Pipeline	Canada	2.2	2.6	2.5	1.7 (Note: Inter Pipeline reported 2020 revenues of CAN$2.4 billion. The yearly average exchange rate for Canadian dollars to U.S. dollars in 2020 was 0.7462, which equates to $1.7 billion in U.S. dollars.)	2.3 (Note: Inter Pipeline reported 2021 revenues of CAN$2.9 billion. The yearly average exchange rate for Canadian dollars to U.S. dollars in 2021 was 0.7978, which equates to $2.3 billion in U.S. dollars.)	(Note: Brookfield Infrastructure Partners obtained 65.6 percent of all outstanding Inter Pipeline shares in August 2021, and Inter Pipeline was delisted on the Toronto Stock Exchange after the close of trading on November 1, 2021.)
Keyera	Canada	0.3 (Note: Keyera reported 2017 revenues of CAN$0.418 billion. The yearly average exchange rate for Canadian dollars to U.S. dollars in 2017 was 0.7713, which equates to $0.3 billion in U.S. dollars.)	0.3 (Note: Keyera reported 2018 revenues of CAN$0.458 billion. The yearly average exchange rate for Canadian dollars to U.S. dollars in 2018 was 0.7717, which equates to $0.3 billion in U.S. dollars.)	0.3 (Note: Keyera reported 2019 revenues of CAN$0.513 billion. The yearly average exchange rate for Canadian dollars to U.S. dollars in 2019 was 0.7538, which equates to $0.3 billion in U.S. dollars.)	1.6 (Note: Keyera reported 2020 revenues of CAN$2.276 billion. The yearly average exchange rate for Canadian dollars to U.S. dollars in 2020 was 0.7462, which equates to $1.6 billion in U.S. dollars.)	3.3 (Note: Keyera reported 2021 revenues of CAN$3.181 billion. The yearly average exchange rate for Canadian dollars to U.S. dollars in 2021 was 0.7978, which equates to $3.3 billion in U.S. dollars.)	5.4 (Note: Keyera reported 2022 revenues of CAN$7.060 billion. The yearly average exchange rate for Canadian dollars to U.S. dollars in 2022 was 0.7688, which equates to $5.4 billion in U.S. dollars.)
MEG Energy	Canada	1.9 (Note: MEG Energy reported 2017 revenues of CAN$2.474 billion. The yearly average exchange rate for Canadian dollars to U.S. dollars in 2017 was 0.7713, which equates to $1.9 billion in U.S. dollars.)	1.8 (Note: MEG Energy reported 2018 revenues of CAN$2.447 billion. The yearly average exchange rate for Canadian dollars to U.S. dollars in 2018 was 0.7717, which equates to $1.8 billion in U.S. dollars.)	2.2 (Note: MEG Energy reported 2019 revenues of CAN$3.003 billion. The yearly average exchange rate for Canadian dollars to U.S. dollars in 2019 was 0.7538, which equates to $2.2 billion in U.S. dollars.)	1.6 (Note: MEG Energy reported 2020 revenues of CAN$2.244 billion. The yearly average exchange rate for Canadian dollars to U.S. dollars in 2020 was 0.7462, which equates to $1.6 billion in U.S. dollars.)	3.4 (Note: MEG Energy reported 2021 revenues of CAN$4.298 billion. The yearly average exchange rate for Canadian dollars to U.S. dollars in 2021 was 0.7978, which equates to $3.4 billion in U.S. dollars.)	4.7 (Note: MEG Energy reported 2022 revenues of CAN$6.118 billion. The yearly average exchange rate for Canadian dollars to U.S. dollars in 2022 was 0.7688, which equates to $4.7 billion in U.S. dollars.)
Paramount Resources	Canada	0.3 (Note: Paramount Resources reported 2017 revenues of CAN$0.462 billion. The yearly average exchange rate for Canadian dollars to U.S. dollars in 2017 was 0.7713, which equates to $0.3 billion in U.S. dollars.)	0.6 (Note: Paramount Resources reported 2018 revenues of CAN$0.903 billion. The yearly average exchange rate for Canadian dollars to U.S. dollars in 2018 was 0.7717, which equates to $0.6 billion in U.S. dollars.)	0.6 (Note: Paramount Resources reported 2019 revenues of CAN$0.914 billion. The yearly average exchange rate for Canadian dollars to U.S. dollars in 2019 was 0.7538, which equates to $0.6 billion in U.S. dollars.)	0.4 (Note: Paramount Resources reported 2020 revenues of CAN$0.626 billion. The yearly average exchange rate for Canadian dollars to U.S. dollars in 2020 was 0.7462, which equates to $0.4 billion in U.S. dollars.)	1.1 (Note: Paramount Resources reported 2021 revenues of CAN$1.383 billion. The yearly average exchange rate for Canadian dollars to U.S. dollars in 2021 was 0.7978, which equates to $1.1 billion in U.S. dollars.)	1.6 (Note: Paramount Resources reported 2022 revenues of CAN$2.189 billion. The yearly average exchange rate for Canadian dollars to U.S. dollars in 2022 was 0.7688, which equates to $1.6 billion in U.S. dollars.)
Pembina Pipeline	Canada	5.4	7.3	7.2	5.9	8.6	8.9 (Note: Pembina Pipeline reported 2022 revenues of CAN$11.611 billion. The yearly average exchange rate for Canadian dollars to U.S. dollars in 2022 was 0.7688, which equates to $8.9 billion in U.S. dollars.)
Suncor Energy	Canada	25.3 (Note: Suncor Energy reported 2017 revenues of CAN$32.8 billion. The yearly average exchange rate for Canadian dollars to U.S. dollars in 2017 was 0.7713, which equates to $25.3 billion in U.S. dollars.)	30.5 (Note: Suncor Energy reported 2018 revenues of CAN$39.5 billion. The yearly average exchange rate for Canadian dollars to U.S. dollars in 2018 was 0.7717, which equates to $30.5 billion in U.S. dollars.)	30.0 (Note: Suncor Energy reported 2019 revenues of CAN$39.8 billion. The yearly average exchange rate for Canadian dollars to U.S. dollars in 2019 was 0.7538, which equates to $30.0 billion in U.S. dollars.)	18.5 (Note: Suncor Energy reported 2020 revenues of CAN$24.9 billion. The yearly average exchange rate for Canadian dollars to U.S. dollars in 2020 was 0.7462, which equates to $18.5 billion in U.S. dollars.)	32.7 (Note: Suncor Energy reported 2021 revenues of CAN$41.1 billion. The yearly average exchange rate for Canadian dollars to U.S. dollars in 2021 was 0.7978, which equates to $32.7 billion in U.S. dollars.)	44.9 (Note: Suncor Energy reported 2022 revenues of CAN$58.467 billion. The yearly average exchange rate for Canadian dollars to U.S. dollars in 2022 was 0.7688, which equates to $44.9 billion in U.S. dollars.)
Tourmaline Oil	Canada	1.2 (Note: Tourmaline Oil Corp. reported 2017 revenues of CAN$1.647 billion. The yearly average exchange rate for Canadian dollars to U.S. dollars in 2017 was 0.7713, which equates to $1.2 billion in U.S. dollars.)	1.6 (Note: Tourmaline Oil Corp. reported 2018 revenues of CAN$2.104 billion. The yearly average exchange rate for Canadian dollars to U.S. dollars in 2018 was 0.7717, which equates to $1.6 billion in U.S. dollars.)	1.5 (Note: Tourmaline Oil Corp. reported 2019 revenues of CAN$2.076 billion. The yearly average exchange rate for Canadian dollars to U.S. dollars in 2019 was 0.7538, which equates to $1.5 billion in U.S. dollars.)	1.6 (Note: Tourmaline Oil Corp. reported 2020 revenues of CAN$2.16 billion. The yearly average exchange rate for Canadian dollars to U.S. dollars in 2020 was 0.7462, which equates to $1.6 billion in U.S. dollars.)	3.4 (Note: Tourmaline Oil Corp. reported 2021 revenues of CAN$4.287 billion. The yearly average exchange rate for Canadian dollars to U.S. dollars in 2021 was 0.7978, which equates to $3.4 billion in U.S. dollars.)	6.7 (Note: Tourmaline Oil reported 2022 revenues of CAN$8.831 billion. The yearly average exchange rate for Canadian dollars to U.S. dollars in 2022 was 0.7688, which equates to $6.7 billion in U.S. dollars.)
TC Energy	Canada	10.3 (Note: TC Energy reported 2017 revenues of CAN$13.449 billion. The yearly average exchange rate for Canadian dollars to U.S. dollars in 2017 was 0.7713, which equates to $10.3 billion in U.S. dollars.)	10.5 (Note: TC Energy reported 2018 revenues of CAN$13.679 billion. The yearly average exchange rate for Canadian dollars to U.S. dollars in 2018 was 0.7717, which equates to $10.5 billion in U.S. dollars.)	9.9 (Note: TC Energy reported 2019 revenues of CAN$13.255 billion. The yearly average exchange rate for Canadian dollars to U.S. dollars in 2019 was 0.7538, which equates to $9.9 billion in U.S. dollars.)	9.6 (Note: TC Energy reported 2020 revenues of CAN$24.9 billion. The yearly average exchange rate for Canadian dollars to U.S. dollars in 2020 was 0.7462, which equates to $9.6 billion in U.S. dollars.)	10.6 (Note: TC Energy reported 2021 revenues of CAN$13.387 billion. The yearly average exchange rate for Canadian dollars to U.S. dollars in 2021 was 0.7978, which equates to $10.6 billion in U.S. dollars.)	11.5 (Note: TC Energy reported 2022 revenues of CAN$14.977 billion. The yearly average exchange rate for Canadian dollars to U.S. dollars in 2022 was 0.7688, which equates to $11.5 billion in U.S. dollars.)
Vermilion Energy	Canada	0.7 (Note: Vermilion Energy reported 2017 revenues of CAN$1.024 billion. The yearly average exchange rate for Canadian dollars to U.S. dollars in 2017 was 0.7713, which equates to $0.7 billion in U.S. dollars.)	1.1 (Note: Vermilion Energy reported 2018 revenues of CAN$1.525 billion. The yearly average exchange rate for Canadian dollars to U.S. dollars in 2018 was 0.7717, which equates to $1.1 billion in U.S. dollars.)	1.3 (Note: Vermilion Energy reported 2019 revenues of CAN$1.747 billion. The yearly average exchange rate for Canadian dollars to U.S. dollars in 2019 was 0.7538, which equates to $1.3 billion in U.S. dollars.)	0.8 (Note: Vermilion Energy reported 2020 revenues of CAN$1.140 billion. The yearly average exchange rate for Canadian dollars to U.S. dollars in 2020 was 0.7462, which equates to $0.8 billion in U.S. dollars.)	1.6 (Note: Vermilion Energy reported 2021 revenues of CAN$2.040 billion. The yearly average exchange rate for Canadian dollars to U.S. dollars in 2021 was 0.7978, which equates to $1.6 billion in U.S. dollars.)	2.6 (Note: Vermilion Energy reported 2022 revenues of CAN$3.476 billion. The yearly average exchange rate for Canadian dollars to U.S. dollars in 2022 was 0.7688, which equates to $2.6 billion in U.S. dollars.)
Whitecap Resources	Canada	0.7 (Note: Whitecap Resources reported 2017 revenues of CAN$1.000 billion. The yearly average exchange rate for Canadian dollars to U.S. dollars in 2017 was 0.7713, which equates to $0.7 billion in U.S. dollars.)	1.1 (Note: Whitecap Resources reported 2018 revenues of CAN$1.525 billion. The yearly average exchange rate for Canadian dollars to U.S. dollars in 2018 was 0.7717, which equates to $1.1 billion in U.S. dollars.)	1.0 (Note: Whitecap Resources reported 2019 revenues of CAN$1.454 billion. The yearly average exchange rate for Canadian dollars to U.S. dollars in 2019 was 0.7538, which equates to $1.0 billion in U.S. dollars.)	0.6 (Note: Whitecap Resources reported 2020 revenues of CAN$0.931 billion. The yearly average exchange rate for Canadian dollars to U.S. dollars in 2020 was 0.7462, which equates to $0.6 billion in U.S. dollars.)	2.1 (Note: Whitecap Resources reported 2021 revenues of CAN$2.694 billion. The yearly average exchange rate for Canadian dollars to U.S. dollars in 2021 was 0.7978, which equates to $2.1 billion in U.S. dollars.)	3.6 (Note: Whitecap Resources reported 2022 revenues of CAN$4.780 billion. The yearly average exchange rate for Canadian dollars to U.S. dollars in 2022 was 0.7688, which equates to $3.6 billion in U.S. dollars.)
Empresas Copec	Chile	20.3	23.9	23.7	18.0	24.7	30.7
Empresa Nacional del Petróleo	Chile	6.4	8.3	7.6	4.8	7.6	12.3
China National Offshore Oil	China	27.5 (Note: China National Offshore Oil Company reported 2017 revenues of ¥186.390 billion. The yearly average exchange rate for Chinese renminbi to U.S. dollars in 2017 was 0.148, which equates to $27.5 billion in U.S. dollars.)	34.3 (Note: China National Offshore Oil Company reported 2018 revenues of ¥226.963 billion. The yearly average exchange rate for Chinese renminbi to U.S. dollars in 2018 was 0.1514, which equates to $34.3 billion in U.S. dollars.)	32.4 (Note: China National Offshore Oil Company reported 2019 revenues of ¥233.199 billion. The yearly average exchange rate for Chinese renminbi to U.S. dollars in 2019 was 0.1393, which equates to $32.4 billion in U.S. dollars.)	22.5 (Note: China National Offshore Oil Company reported 2020 revenues of ¥155.372 billion. The yearly average exchange rate for Chinese renminbi to U.S. dollars in 2020 was 0.145, which equates to $22.5 billion in U.S. dollars.)	38.1 (Note: China National Offshore Oil Company reported 2021 revenues of ¥246.111 billion. The yearly average exchange rate for Chinese renminbi to U.S. dollars in 2021 was 0.155, which equates to $38.1 billion in U.S. dollars.)	62.7 (Note: China National Offshore Oil Company reported 2022 revenues of ¥422.2 billion. The yearly average exchange rate for Chinese renminbi to U.S. dollars in 2022 was 0.1487, which equates to $62.7 billion in U.S. dollars.)
China Suntien Green Energy	China	1.0 (Note: China Suntien Green Energy reported 2017 revenues of ¥7.057 billion. The yearly average exchange rate for Chinese renminbi to U.S. dollars in 2017 was 0.148, which equates to $1.0 billion in U.S. dollars.)	1.5 (Note: China Suntien Green Energy reported 2018 revenues of ¥9.975 billion. The yearly average exchange rate for Chinese renminbi to U.S. dollars in 2018 was 0.1514, which equates to $1.5 billion in U.S. dollars.)	1.6 (Note: China Suntien Green Energy reported 2019 revenues of ¥11.943 billion. The yearly average exchange rate for Chinese renminbi to U.S. dollars in 2019 was 0.1393, which equates to $1.6 billion in U.S. dollars.)	1.8 (Note: China Suntien Green Energy reported 2020 revenues of ¥13.510 billion. The yearly average exchange rate for Chinese renminbi to U.S. dollars in 2020 was 0.145, which equates to $1.8 billion in U.S. dollars.)	2.4 (Note: China Suntien Green Energy reported 2021 revenues of ¥15.985 billion. The yearly average exchange rate for Chinese renminbi to U.S. dollars in 2021 was 0.155, which equates to $2.4 billion in U.S. dollars.)	2.7 (Note: China Suntien Green Energy reported 2022 revenues of ¥18.560 billion. The yearly average exchange rate for Chinese renminbi to U.S. dollars in 2022 was 0.1487, which equates to $2.7 billion in U.S. dollars.)
COSCO Shipping Energy	China	1.4 (Note: COSCO Shipping Energy initially reported 2017 revenues of ¥1.774 billion. It restated these results in its 2018 annual report, and reported 2017 revenues of ¥9.504 billion. The yearly average exchange rate for Chinese renminbi to U.S. dollars in 2017 was 0.148, which equates to $1.4 billion in U.S. dollars.)	1.8 (Note: COSCO Shipping Energy reported 2018 revenues of ¥12.099 billion. The yearly average exchange rate for Chinese renminbi to U.S. dollars in 2018 was 0.1514, which equates to $1.8 billion in U.S. dollars.)	1.9 (Note: COSCO Shipping Energy reported 2019 revenues of ¥11.943 billion. The yearly average exchange rate for Chinese renminbi to U.S. dollars in 2019 was 0.1393, which equates to $1.9 billion in U.S. dollars.)	2.3 (Note: COSCO Shipping Energy reported 2020 revenues of ¥16.268 billion. The yearly average exchange rate for Chinese renminbi to U.S. dollars in 2020 was 0.145, which equates to $2.3 billion in U.S. dollars.)	1.9 (Note: COSCO Shipping Energy reported 2021 revenues of ¥12.644 billion. The yearly average exchange rate for Chinese renminbi to U.S. dollars in 2021 was 0.155, which equates to $1.9 billion in U.S. dollars.)	2.71.9 (Note: COSCO Shipping Energy reported 2022 revenues of ¥18.566 billion. The yearly average exchange rate for Chinese renminbi to U.S. dollars in 2022 was 0.1487, which equates to $2.7 billion in U.S. dollars.)
China National Petroleum Corporation	China	346.3 (Note: China National Petroleum Corporation reported 2017 revenues of ¥2.340 trillion. The yearly average exchange rate for Chinese renminbi to U.S. dollars in 2017 was 0.148, which equates to $346.3 billion in U.S. dollars.)	414.6 (Note: China National Petroleum Corporation reported 2018 revenues of ¥2.739 trillion. The yearly average exchange rate for Chinese renminbi to U.S. dollars in 2018 was 0.1514, which equates to $414.6 billion in U.S. dollars.)	386.0 (Note: China National Petroleum Corporation reported 2019 revenues of ¥2.771 trillion. The yearly average exchange rate for Chinese renminbi to U.S. dollars in 2019 was 0.1393, which equates to $386.0 billion in U.S. dollars.)	302.6 (Note: China National Petroleum Corporation reported 2020 revenues of ¥2.087 trillion. The yearly average exchange rate for Chinese renminbi to U.S. dollars in 2020 was 0.145, which equates to $302.6 billion in U.S. dollars.)	435.1 (Note: China National Petroleum Corporation reported 2021 revenues of ¥2.807 trillion. The yearly average exchange rate for Chinese renminbi to U.S. dollars in 2021 was 0.155, which equates to $435.1 billion in U.S. dollars.)	
Sinopec	China	349.3 (Note: Sinopec reported 2017 revenues of ¥2.36 trillion. The yearly average exchange rate for Chinese renminbi to U.S. dollars in 2017 was 0.148, which equates to $349.3 billion in U.S. dollars.)	437.7 (Note: Sinopec reported 2018 revenues of ¥2.891 trillion. The yearly average exchange rate for Chinese renminbi to U.S. dollars in 2018 was 0.1514, which equates to $437.7 billion in U.S. dollars.)	429.5 (Note: Sinopec reported 2019 revenues of ¥2.966 trillion. The yearly average exchange rate for Chinese renminbi to U.S. dollars in 2019 was 0.1448, which equates to $429.5 billion in U.S. dollars.)	305.2 (Note: Sinopec reported 2020 revenues of ¥2.11 trillion. The yearly average exchange rate for Chinese renminbi to U.S. dollars in 2020 was 0.145, which equates to $305.2 billion in U.S. dollars.)	424.8 (Note: Sinopec reported 2021 revenues of ¥2.74 trillion. The yearly average exchange rate for Chinese renminbi to U.S. dollars in 2021 was 0.155, which equates to $424.8 billion in U.S. dollars.)	478.5 (Note: Sinopec reported 2022 revenues of ¥3.218 trillion. The yearly average exchange rate for Chinese renminbi to U.S. dollars in 2022 was 0.1487, which equates to $478.5 billion in U.S. dollars.)
Guanghui Energy	China	7.9	12.6	13.7	14.9	24.3	58.6
Ecopetrol	Colombia	16.7 (Note: Ecopetrol reported 2017 revenues of COP$55.954 trillion. The yearly average exchange rate for Colombian pesos to U.S. dollars in 2017 was 0.0003, which equates to $16.7 billion in U.S. dollars.)	20.5 (Note: Ecopetrol reported 2018 revenues of COP$68.603 trillion. The yearly average exchange rate for Colombian pesos to U.S. dollars in 2018 was 0.0003, which equates to $20.5 billion in U.S. dollars.)	21.4 (Note: Ecopetrol reported 2019 revenues of COP$71.488 trillion. The yearly average exchange rate for Colombian pesos to U.S. dollars in 2019 was 0.0003, which equates to $21.4 billion in U.S. dollars.)	15.0 (Note: Ecopetrol reported 2020 revenues of COP$50.223 trillion. The yearly average exchange rate for Colombian pesos to U.S. dollars in 2020 was 0.0003, which equates to $15.0 billion in U.S. dollars.)	27.5 (Note: Ecopetrol reported 2021 revenues of COP$91.881 trillion. The yearly average exchange rate for Colombian pesos to U.S. dollars in 2021 was 0.0003, which equates to $27.5 billion in U.S. dollars.)	47.8 (Note: Ecopetrol reported 2022 revenues of COP$159.611 trillion. The yearly average exchange rate for Colombian pesos to U.S. dollars in 2022 was 0.0003, which equates to $47.8 billion in U.S. dollars.)
INA d.d.	Croatia	2.8 (Note: INA reported 2017 revenues of kn19.083 billion. The yearly average exchange rate for Croatian kuna to U.S. dollars in 2017 was 0.1515, which equates to $2.8 billion in U.S. dollars.)	3.7 (Note: INA reported 2018 revenues of kn23.294 billion. The yearly average exchange rate for Croatian kuna to U.S. dollars in 2018 was 0.1592, which equates to $3.7 billion in U.S. dollars.)	3.5 (Note: INA reported 2019 revenues of kn23.297 billion. The yearly average exchange rate for Croatian kuna to U.S. dollars in 2019 was 0.1509, which equates to $3.5 billion in U.S. dollars.)	2.3 (Note: INA reported 2020 revenues of kn15.255 billion. The yearly average exchange rate for Croatian kuna to U.S. dollars in 2020 was 0.1515, which equates to $2.3 billion in U.S. dollars.)	3.5 (Note: INA reported 2021 revenues of kn22.719 billion. The yearly average exchange rate for Croatian kuna to U.S. dollars in 2021 was 0.1571, which equates to $3.5 billion in U.S. dollars.)	4.9 (Note: INA reported 2022 revenues of kn35.114 billion. The yearly average exchange rate for Croatian kuna to U.S. dollars in 2022 was 0.1399, which equates to $4.9 billion in U.S. dollars.)
Moravské naftové doly (MND)	Czech Republic		3.2 (Note: MND reported 2018 revenues of Kč69.912 billion. The yearly average exchange rate for Czech koruna to U.S. dollars in 2018 was 0.0461, which equates to $3.2 billion in U.S. dollars.)	3.0 (Note: MND reported 2019 revenues of Kč69.391 billion. The yearly average exchange rate for Czech koruna to U.S. dollars in 2019 was 0.0436, which equates to $3.0 billion in U.S. dollars.)	2.0 (Note: MND reported 2020 revenues of Kč46.331 billion. The yearly average exchange rate for Czech koruna to U.S. dollars in 2020 was 0.0432, which equates to $2.0 billion in U.S. dollars.)	5.4 (Note: MND reported 2021 revenues of Kč118.219 billion. The yearly average exchange rate for Czech koruna to U.S. dollars in 2021 was 0.0461, which equates to $5.4 billion in U.S. dollars.)	9.0 (Note: MND reported 2022 revenues of Kč210.262 billion. The yearly average exchange rate for Czech koruna to U.S. dollars in 2022 was 0.0429, which equates to $9.0 billion in U.S. dollars.)
Petroecuador	Ecuador	9.5	11.6	11.8	9.9 (Note: Petroamazonas (a state-owned corporation) conducted petroleum extraction and refining in Ecuador, while Petroecuador oversaw marketing and sales. The two firms merged in December 2020. Petroamazonas did not report revenues, and no data for its revenues is available. Data in this table for 2017, 2018, and 2019 are for Petroecuador only. For 2020 and going forward, data is for the merged company.)	12.1	
Neste	Finland	14.9 (Note: Neste reported 2017 revenues of €13.217 billion. The yearly average exchange rate for euros to U.S. dollars in 2017 was 1.1304, which equates to $14.9 billion in U.S. dollars.)	17.6 (Note: Neste reported 2018 revenues of €14.918 billion. The yearly average exchange rate for euros to U.S. dollars in 2018 was 1.1811, which equates to $17.6 billion in U.S. dollars.)	17.7 (Note: Neste reported 2019 revenues of €15.840 billion. The yearly average exchange rate for euros to U.S. dollars in 2019 was 1.1199, which equates to $17.7 billion in U.S. dollars.)	13.4 (Note: Neste reported 2020 revenues of €11.751 billion. The yearly average exchange rate for euros to U.S. dollars in 2020 was 1.142, which equates to $13.4 billion in U.S. dollars.)	17.9 (Note: Neste reported 2021 revenues of €15.148 billion. The yearly average exchange rate for euros to U.S. dollars in 2021 was 1.183, which equates to $17.9 billion in U.S. dollars.)	27.0 (Note: Neste reported 2022 revenues of €25.707 billion. The yearly average exchange rate for euros to U.S. dollars in 2022 was 1.0538, which equates to $27.0 billion in U.S. dollars.)
Engie	France	59.6	57.0	60.1	44.3 (Note: Engie originally reported $55.8 billion in revenues for 2020, but restated the results.)	57.9	98.9 (Note: Engie reported 2022 revenues of €93.865 billion. The yearly average exchange rate for euros to U.S. dollars in 2022 was 1.0538, which equates to $98.9 billion in U.S. dollars.)
Schlumberger	France	21.9	24.2	32.9	23.6	22.9	28.0
TechnipFMC	France	17.0 (Note: TechnipFMC reported 2017 revenues of $15.056 billion. The yearly average exchange rate for euros to U.S. dollars in 2017 was 1.1304, which equates to $17.0 billion in U.S. dollars.)	14.8 (Note: TechnipFMC reported 2018 revenues of $12.599 billion. The yearly average exchange rate for euros to U.S. dollars in 2018 was 1.1811, which equates to $14.8 billion in U.S. dollars.)	15.0 (Note: TechnipFMC reported 2019 revenues of $13.426 billion. The yearly average exchange rate for euros to U.S. dollars in 2019 was 1.1199, which equates to $15.0 billion in U.S. dollars.)	7.4 (Note: TechnipFMC reported 2020 revenues of $6.537 billion. It had originally reported 2020 income of $13.057 billion, but restated this income in 2021 due to discontinued operations. The yearly average exchange rate for euros to U.S. dollars in 2020 was 1.142, which equates to $7.4 billion in U.S. dollars.)	7.5 (Note: TechnipFMC reported 2021 revenues of $6.413 billion. The yearly average exchange rate for euros to U.S. dollars in 2021 was 1.183, which equates to $7.5 billion in U.S. dollars.)	6.7
TotalEnergies	France	171.4	209.3	200.3	140.6	205.8	285.8
Wintershall Dea	Germany			4.3 (Note: Wintershall Dea reported 2019 revenues of €3.873 billion. The yearly average exchange rate for euros to U.S. dollars in 2019 was 1.1199, which equates to $4.3 billion in U.S. dollars.) (Note: Wintershall Holding GmbH and DEA Deutsche Erdoel AG merged on May 1, 2019. Financial data for 2019 is for May 1, 2019 to December 31, 2019.)	4.4 (Note: Wintershall Dea reported 2020 revenues of €3.892 billion. The yearly average exchange rate for euros to U.S. dollars in 2020 was 1.142, which equates to $4.4 billion in U.S. dollars.)	9.6 (Note: Wintershall Dea reported 2021 revenues of €8.188 billion. The yearly average exchange rate for euros to U.S. dollars in 2021 was 1.183, which equates to $9.6 billion in U.S. dollars.)	19.8 (Note: Wintershall Dea reported 2022 revenues of €18.866 billion. The yearly average exchange rate for euros to U.S. dollars in 2022 was 1.0638, which equates to $19.8 billion in U.S. dollars.)
Hellenic Petroleum	Greece	9.0 (Note: Hellenic Petroleum reported 2017 revenues of €7.994 billion. The yearly average exchange rate for euros to U.S. dollars in 2017 was 1.1304, which equates to $9.0 billion in U.S. dollars.)	11.5 (Note: Hellenic Petroleum reported 2018 revenues of €9.769 billion. The yearly average exchange rate for euros to U.S. dollars in 2018 was 1.1811, which equates to $11.5 billion in U.S. dollars.)	9.9 (Note: Hellenic Petroleum reported 2019 revenues of €8.856 billion. The yearly average exchange rate for euros to U.S. dollars in 2019 was 1.1199, which equates to $9.9 billion in U.S. dollars.)	6.6 (Note: Hellenic Petroleum reported 2020 revenues of €5.781 billion. The yearly average exchange rate for euros to U.S. dollars in 2020 was 1.142, which equates to $6.6 billion in U.S. dollars.)	10.9 (Note: Hellenic Petroleum reported 2021 revenues of €9.222 billion. The yearly average exchange rate for euros to U.S. dollars in 2021 was 1.183, which equates to $10.9 billion in U.S. dollars.)	15.2 (Note: Hellenic Petroleum reported 2022 revenues of €14.508 billion. The yearly average exchange rate for euros to U.S. dollars in 2022 was 1.0538, which equates to $15.2 billion in U.S. dollars.)
Motor Oil Hellas	Greece	8.8 (Note: Motor Oil Hellas reported 2017 revenues of €7.843 billion. The yearly average exchange rate for euros to U.S. dollars in 2017 was 1.1304, which equates to $8.8 billion in U.S. dollars.)	11.2 (Note: Motor Oil Hellas reported 2018 revenues of €9.519 billion. The yearly average exchange rate for euros to U.S. dollars in 2018 was 1.1811, which equates to $11.2 billion in U.S. dollars.)	10.4 (Note: Motor Oil Hellas reported 2019 revenues of €9.372 billion. The yearly average exchange rate for euros to U.S. dollars in 2019 was 1.1199, which equates to $10.4 billion in U.S. dollars.)	6.9 (Note: Motor Oil Hellas reported 2020 revenues of €6.12 billion. The yearly average exchange rate for euros to U.S. dollars in 2020 was 1.142, which equates to $6.9 billion in U.S. dollars.)	12.1 (Note: Motor Oil Hellas reported 2021 revenues of €10.266 billion. The yearly average exchange rate for euros to U.S. dollars in 2021 was 1.183, which equates to $12.1 billion in U.S. dollars.)	17.5 (Note: Motor Oil Hellas reported 2022 revenues of €16.630 billion. The yearly average exchange rate for euros to U.S. dollars in 2022 was 1.0538, which equates to $17.5 billion in U.S. dollars.)
MOL	Hungary	15.3 (Note: MOL reported 2017 revenues of Ft4.155 trillion. The yearly average exchange rate for Hungarian forint to U.S. dollars in 2017 was 0.0037, which equates to $15.3 billion in U.S. dollars.)	19.2 (Note: MOL reported 2018 revenues of Ft5.21 trillion. The yearly average exchange rate for Hungarian forint to U.S. dollars in 2018 was 0.0037, which equates to $19.2 billion in U.S. dollars.)	18.0 (Note: MOL reported 2019 revenues of Ft5.297 trillion. The yearly average exchange rate for Hungarian forint to U.S. dollars in 2019 was 0.0034, which equates to $18.0 billion in U.S. dollars.)	13.4 (Note: MOL reported 2020 revenues of Ft4.066 trillion. The yearly average exchange rate for Hungarian forint to U.S. dollars in 2020 was 0.0033, which equates to $13.4 billion in U.S. dollars.)	19.7 (Note: MOL reported 2021 revenues of Ft5.992 trillion. The yearly average exchange rate for Hungarian forint to U.S. dollars in 2021 was 0.0033, which equates to $19.7 billion in U.S. dollars.)	26.7 (Note: MOL reported 2022 revenues of Ft9.911 trillion. The yearly average exchange rate for Hungarian forint to U.S. dollars in 2022 was 0.0027, which equates to $26.7 billion in U.S. dollars.)
Bharat Petroleum	India	37.8 (Note: Bharat Petroleum's fiscal year runs from 1 April to 31 March. The revenues for 2017 are therefore for the fiscal year which ran 1 April 2017 to 31 March 2018.) (Note: Bharat Petroleum reported 2017 revenues of ₹2.801 trillion. The yearly average exchange rate for Indian rupees to U.S. dollars in 2017 was 0.0154, which equates to $37.8 billion in U.S. dollars.)	45.9 (Note: Bharat Petroleum's fiscal year runs from 1 April to 31 March. The revenues for 2018 are therefore for the fiscal year which ran 1 April 2018 to 31 March 2019.) (Note: Bharat Petroleum reported 2018 revenues of ₹3.406 trillion. The yearly average exchange rate for Indian rupees to U.S. dollars in 2018 was 0.0146, which equates to $45.9 billion in U.S. dollars.)	44.2 (Note: Bharat Petroleum's fiscal year runs from 1 April to 31 March. The revenues for 2019 are therefore for the fiscal year which ran 1 April 2019 to 31 March 2020.) (Note: Bharat Petroleum reported 2019 revenues of ₹3.275 trillion. The yearly average exchange rate for Indian rupees to U.S. dollars in 2019 was 0.0142, which equates to $44.2 billion in U.S. dollars.)	41.3 (Note: Bharat Petroleum's fiscal year runs from 1 April to 31 March. The revenues for 2020 are therefore for the fiscal year which ran 1 April 2020 to 31 March 2021.) (Note: Bharat Petroleum reported 2020 revenues of ₹3.062 trillion. The yearly average exchange rate for Indian rupees to U.S. dollars in 2020 was 0.0135, which equates to $41.3 billion in U.S. dollars.)	58.8 (Note: Bharat Petroleum's fiscal year runs from 1 April to 31 March. The revenues for 2021 are therefore for the fiscal year which ran 1 April 2021 to 31 March 2022.) (Note: Bharat Petroleum reported 2021 revenues of ₹4.358 trillion. The yearly average exchange rate for Indian rupees to U.S. dollars in 2021 was 0.0135, which equates to $58.5 billion in U.S. dollars.)	68.0 (Note: Bharat Petroleum's fiscal year runs from 1 April to 31 March. The revenues for 2023 are therefore for the fiscal year which ran 1 April 2023 to 31 March 2023.) (Note: Bharat Petroleum reported 2022 revenues of ₹5.356 trillion. The yearly average exchange rate for Indian rupees to U.S. dollars in 2022 was 0.0127, which equates to $68.0 billion in U.S. dollars.)
Hindustan Petroleum	India	33.2 (Note: Hindustan Petroleum's fiscal year runs from 1 April to 31 March. The revenues for 2017 are therefore for the fiscal year which ran 1 April 2017 to 31 March 2018.) (Note: Hindustan Petroleum reported 2017 revenues of ₹2.459 trillion. The yearly average exchange rate for Indian rupees to U.S. dollars in 2017 was 0.0154, which equates to $33.2 billion in U.S. dollars.)	28.2 (Note: Hindustan Petroleum's fiscal year runs from 1 April to 31 March. The revenues for 2018 are therefore for the fiscal year which ran 1 April 2018 to 31 March 2019.) (Note: Hindustan Petroleum reported 2018 revenues of ₹2.096 trillion. The yearly average exchange rate for Indian rupees to U.S. dollars in 2018 was 0.0146, which equates to $28.2 billion in U.S. dollars.)	39.0 (Note: Hindustan Petroleum's fiscal year runs from 1 April to 31 March. The revenues for 2019 are therefore for the fiscal year which ran 1 April 2019 to 31 March 2020.) (Note: Hindustan Petroleum reported 2019 revenues of ₹2.892 trillion. The yearly average exchange rate for Indian rupees to U.S. dollars in 2019 was 0.0142, which equates to $39.0 billion in U.S. dollars.)	36.8 (Note: Hindustan Petroleum's fiscal year runs from 1 April to 31 March. The revenues for 2020 are therefore for the fiscal year which ran 1 April 2020 to 31 March 2021.) (Note: Hindustan Petroleum reported 2020 revenues of ₹2.731 trillion. The yearly average exchange rate for Indian rupees to U.S. dollars in 2020 was 0.0135, which equates to $36.8 billion in U.S. dollars.)	50.8 (Note: Hindustan Petroleum's fiscal year runs from 1 April to 31 March. The revenues for 2021 are therefore for the fiscal year which ran 1 April 2021 to 31 March 2022.) (Note: Hindustan Petroleum reported 2021 revenues of ₹3.768 trillion. The yearly average exchange rate for Indian rupees to U.S. dollars in 2021 was 0.0135, which equates to $50.8 billion in U.S. dollars.)	59.4 (Note: Hindustan Petroleum's fiscal year runs from 1 April to 31 March. The revenues for 2022 are therefore for the fiscal year which ran 1 April 2022 to 31 March 2023.) (Note: Hindustan Petroleum reported 2022 revenues of ₹4.682 trillion. The yearly average exchange rate for Indian rupees to U.S. dollars in 2022 was 0.0127, which equates to $59.4 billion in U.S. dollars.)
Indian Oil	India	61.7 (Note: The Indian Oil Corporation's fiscal year runs from 1 April to 31 March. The revenues for 2017 are therefore for the fiscal year which ran 1 April 2017 to 31 March 2018.) (Note: The Indian Oil Corporation reported 2017 revenues of ₹4.576 trillion. The yearly average exchange rate for Indian rupees to U.S. dollars in 2017 was 0.0154, which equates to $61.7 billion in U.S. dollars.)	69.5 (Note: The Indian Oil Corporation's fiscal year runs from 1 April to 31 March. The revenues for 2018 are therefore for the fiscal year which ran 1 April 2018 to 31 March 2019.) (Note: The Indian Oil Corporation reported 2018 revenues of ₹5.155 trillion. The yearly average exchange rate for Indian rupees to U.S. dollars in 2018 was 0.0146, which equates to $69.5 billion in U.S. dollars.)	76.9 (Note: The Indian Oil Corporation's fiscal year runs from 1 April to 31 March. The revenues for 2019 are therefore for the fiscal year which ran 1 April 2019 to 31 March 2020.) (Note: The Indian Oil Corporation reported 2019 revenues of ₹5.699 trillion. The yearly average exchange rate for Indian rupees to U.S. dollars in 2019 was 0.0142, which equates to $76.9 billion in U.S. dollars.)	70.1 (Note: The Indian Oil Corporation's fiscal year runs from 1 April to 31 March. The revenues for 2020 are therefore for the fiscal year which ran 1 April 2020 to 31 March 2021.) (Note: The Indian Oil Corporation reported 2020 revenues of ₹5.194 trillion. The yearly average exchange rate for Indian rupees to U.S. dollars in 2020 was 0.0135, which equates to $69.5 billion in U.S. dollars.)	99.8 (Note: The Indian Oil Corporation's fiscal year runs from 1 April to 31 March. The revenues for 2021 are therefore for the fiscal year which ran 1 April 2021 to 31 March 2022.) (Note: The Indian Oil Corporation reported 2021 revenues of ₹7.398 trillion. The yearly average exchange rate for Indian rupees to U.S. dollars in 2021 was 0.0135, which equates to $99.8 billion in U.S. dollars.)	119.5 (Note: The Indian Oil Corporation's fiscal year runs from 1 April to 31 March. The revenues for 2022 are therefore for the fiscal year which ran 1 April 2022 to 31 March 2023.) (Note: The Indian Oil Corporation reported 2022 revenues of ₹9.411 trillion. The yearly average exchange rate for Indian rupees to U.S. dollars in 2022 was 0.0127, which equates to $119.5 billion in U.S. dollars.)
ONGC	India	14.3 (Note: The Oil and Natural Gas Corporation's fiscal year runs from 1 April to 31 March. The revenues for 2017 are therefore for the fiscal year which ran 1 April 2017 to 31 March 2018.) (Note: The Oil and Natural Gas Corporation reported 2017 revenues of ₹928.876 billion. The yearly average exchange rate for Indian rupees to U.S. dollars in 2017 was 0.0154, which equates to $14.3 billion in U.S. dollars.)	17.1 (Note: The Oil and Natural Gas Corporation's fiscal year runs from 1 April to 31 March. The revenues for 2018 are therefore for the fiscal year which ran 1 April 2018 to 31 March 2019.) (Note: The Oil and Natural Gas Corporation reported 2018 revenues of ₹1.171 trillion. The yearly average exchange rate for Indian rupees to U.S. dollars in 2018 was 0.0146, which equates to $17.1 billion in U.S. dollars.)	14.6 (Note: The Oil and Natural Gas Corporation's fiscal year runs from 1 April to 31 March. The revenues for 2019 are therefore for the fiscal year which ran 1 April 2019 to 31 March 2020.) (Note: The Oil and Natural Gas Corporation reported 2019 revenues of ₹1.028 trillion. The yearly average exchange rate for Indian rupees to U.S. dollars in 2019 was 0.0142, which equates to $14.6 billion in U.S. dollars.)	10.1 (Note: The Oil and Natural Gas Corporation's fiscal year runs from 1 April to 31 March. The revenues for 2020 are therefore for the fiscal year which ran 1 April 2020 to 31 March 2021.) (Note: The Oil and Natural Gas Corporation reported 2020 revenues of ₹752.836 billion. The yearly average exchange rate for Indian rupees to U.S. dollars in 2020 was 0.0135, which equates to $10.1 billion in U.S. dollars.)	14.8 (Note: The Oil and Natural Gas Corporation's fiscal year runs from 1 April to 31 March. The revenues for 2021 are therefore for the fiscal year which ran 1 April 2021 to 31 March 2022.) (Note: The Oil and Natural Gas Corporation reported 2021 revenues of ₹1.193 trillion. The yearly average exchange rate for Indian rupees to U.S. dollars in 2021 was 0.0135, which equates to $14.8 billion in U.S. dollars.)	87 (Note: The Oil and Natural Gas Corporation's fiscal year runs from 1 April to 31 March. The revenues for 2022 are therefore for the fiscal year which ran 1 April 2022 to 31 March 2023.) (Note: The Oil and Natural Gas Corporation reported 2022 revenues of ₹1.631 trillion. The yearly average exchange rate for Indian rupees to U.S. dollars in 2022 was 0.0127, which equates to $20.7 billion in U.S. dollars.)
Reliance Industries	India	66.2 (Note: Reliance Petroleum's fiscal year runs from 1 April to 31 March. The revenues for 2017 are therefore for the fiscal year which ran 1 April 2017 to 31 March 2018.)	81.9 (Note: Reliance Petroleum's fiscal year runs from 1 April to 31 March. The revenues for 2018 are therefore for the fiscal year which ran 1 April 2018 to 31 March 2019.)	64.5 (Note: Reliance Petroleum's fiscal year runs from 1 April to 31 March. The revenues for 2019 are therefore for the fiscal year which ran 1 April 2019 to 31 March 2020.) (Note: Reliance Petroleum reported 2019 revenues of ₹4.513 trillion. The yearly average exchange rate for Indian rupees to U.S. dollars in 2019 was 0.0142, which equates to $64.5 billion in U.S. dollars.)	43.4 (Note: Reliance Petroleum's fiscal year runs from 1 April to 31 March. The revenues for 2020 are therefore for the fiscal year which ran 1 April 2020 to 31 March 2021.) (Note: Reliance Petroleum reported 2020 revenues of ₹3.221 trillion. The yearly average exchange rate for Indian rupees to U.S. dollars in 2020 was 0.0135, which equates to $43.4 billion in U.S. dollars.)	107.0 (Note: Reliance Petroleum's fiscal year runs from 1 April to 31 March. The revenues for 2021 are therefore for the fiscal year which ran 1 April 2021 to 31 March 2022.) (Note: Reliance Petroleum reported 2021 revenues of ₹7.927 trillion. The yearly average exchange rate for Indian rupees to U.S. dollars in 2021 was 0.0135, which equates to $107.0 billion in U.S. dollars.)	124.0 (Note: Reliance Petroleum's fiscal year runs from 1 April to 31 March. The revenues for 2022 are therefore for the fiscal year which ran 1 April 2022 to 31 March 2023.) (Note: Reliance Petroleum reported 2022 revenues of ₹9.765 trillion. The yearly average exchange rate for Indian rupees to U.S. dollars in 2022 was 0.0127, which equates to $124.0 billion in U.S. dollars.)
Pertamina	Indonesia	46.0	57.9	54.7	41.4	57.5	95.9
National Iranian Oil Company	Iran	110.0	(Note: The National Iranian Oil Company reports almost no information on production, revenues, transfers, or performance.)	(Note: The National Iranian Oil Company reports almost no information on production, revenues, transfers, or performance.)	(Note: The National Iranian Oil Company reports almost no information on production, revenues, transfers, or performance.)	(Note: The National Iranian Oil Company reports almost no information on production, revenues, transfers, or performance.)	(Note: The National Iranian Oil Company reports almost no information on production, revenues, transfers, or performance.)
Iraq National Oil Company	Iraq	59.4 (Note: These figures do not include petroleum revenues produced under the authority of the Kurdistan Regional Government (KRG).The government of Iraq has not been able to control exploration, production, and sales in the KRG since 1992.)	73.4 (Note: These figures do not include petroleum revenues produced under the authority of the Kurdistan Regional Government (KRG).The government of Iraq has not been able to control exploration, production, and sales in the KRG since 1992.)	78.5 (Note: These figures do not include petroleum revenues produced under the authority of the Kurdistan Regional Government (KRG).The government of Iraq has not been able to control exploration, production, and sales in the KRG since 1992.)	42.0	75.6	115.0
BAZAN Group	Israel	5.6	6.6	6.4	4.1	6.5	10.8
Delek	Israel	1.9 (Note: Delek reported 2017 revenues of ₪6.835 billion. The yearly average exchange rate for Israeli new shekels to U.S. dollars in 2017 was 0.2782, which equates to $1.9 billion in U.S. dollars.)	2.2 (Note: Delek reported 2018 revenues of ₪8.128 billion. The yearly average exchange rate for Israeli new shekels to U.S. dollars in 2018 was 0.2784, which equates to $2.2 billion in U.S. dollars.)	0.9 (Note: Delek reported 2019 revenues of ₪3.356 billion. The yearly average exchange rate for Israeli new shekels to U.S. dollars in 2019 was 0.2808, which equates to $0.9 billion in U.S. dollars.)	1.9 (Note: Delek reported 2020 revenues of ₪6.671 billion. The yearly average exchange rate for Israeli new shekels to U.S. dollars in 2020 was 0.2909, which equates to $1.9 billion in U.S. dollars.)	2.4 (Note: Delek reported 2021 revenues of ₪7.873 billion. The yearly average exchange rate for Israeli new shekels to U.S. dollars in 2021 was 0.3095, which equates to $2.4 billion in U.S. dollars.)	3.5 (Note: Delek reported 2022 revenues of ₪11.995 billion. The yearly average exchange rate for Israeli new shekels to U.S. dollars in 2022 was 0.2982, which equates to $3.5 billion in U.S. dollars.)
Paz Oil Company	Israel	3.1 (Note: Paz Oil Company reported 2017 revenues of ₪11.285 billion. The yearly average exchange rate for Israeli new shekels to U.S. dollars in 2017 was 0.2782, which equates to $3.1 billion in U.S. dollars.)	3.9 (Note: Paz Oil Company reported 2018 revenues of ₪14.119 billion. The yearly average exchange rate for Israeli new shekels to U.S. dollars in 2018 was 0.2784, which equates to $3.9 billion in U.S. dollars.)	3.5 (Note: Paz Oil Company reported 2019 revenues of ₪12.696 billion. The yearly average exchange rate for Israeli new shekels to U.S. dollars in 2019 was 0.2808, which equates to $3.5 billion in U.S. dollars.)	2.3 (Note: Paz Oil Company reported 2020 revenues of ₪7.939 billion. The yearly average exchange rate for Israeli new shekels to U.S. dollars in 2020 was 0.2909, which equates to $2.3 billion in U.S. dollars.)	3.5 (Note: Paz Oil Company reported 2021 revenues of ₪11,546 billion. The yearly average exchange rate for Israeli new shekels to U.S. dollars in 2021 was 0.3095, which equates to $3.5 billion in U.S. dollars.)	4.2 (Note: Paz Oil Company reported 2022 revenues of ₪14.154 billion. The yearly average exchange rate for Israeli new shekels to U.S. dollars in 2022 was 0.2982, which equates to $4.2 billion in U.S. dollars.)
Eni	Italy	75.6 (Note: Eni reported 2017 revenues of €66.919 billion. The yearly average exchange rate for euros to U.S. dollars in 2017 was 1.1304, which equates to $75.6 billion in U.S. dollars.)	89.5 (Note: Eni reported 2018 revenues of €75.810 billion. The yearly average exchange rate for euros to U.S. dollars in 2019 was 1.1811, which equates to $89.5 billion in U.S. dollars.)	78.2 (Note: Eni reported 2019 revenues of €69.881 billion. The yearly average exchange rate for euros to U.S. dollars in 2019 was 1.1199, which equates to $78.2 billion in U.S. dollars.)	50.2 (Note: Eni reported 2020 revenues of €43.987 billion. The yearly average exchange rate for euros to U.S. dollars in 2020 was 1.142, which equates to $52.0 billion in U.S. dollars.)	90.5 (Note: Eni reported 2021 revenues of €76.570 billion. The yearly average exchange rate for euros to U.S. dollars in 2021 was 1.183, which equates to $90.5 billion in U.S. dollars.)	139.3 (Note: Eni reported 2022 revenues of €132.236 billion. The yearly average exchange rate for euros to U.S. dollars in 2022 was 1.0538, which equates to $139.3 billion in U.S. dollars.)
Saras S.p.A.	Italy	8.6 (Note: Saras reported 2017 revenues of €7.631 billion. The yearly average exchange rate for euros to U.S. dollars in 2017 was 1.1304, which equates to $8.6 billion in U.S. dollars.)	12.1 (Note: Saras reported 2018 revenues of €10.268 billion. The yearly average exchange rate for euros to U.S. dollars in 2018 was 1.1811, which equates to $12.1 billion in U.S. dollars.)	10.5 (Note: Saras reported 2019 revenues of €9.369 billion. The yearly average exchange rate for euros to U.S. dollars in 2019 was 1.1199, which equates to $10.5 billion in U.S. dollars.)	5.9 (Note: Saras reported 2020 revenues of €5.185 billion. The yearly average exchange rate for euros to U.S. dollars in 2020 was 1.142, which equates to $5.9 billion in U.S. dollars.)	10.1 (Note: Saras reported 2021 revenues of €8.561 billion. The yearly average exchange rate for euros to U.S. dollars in 2021 was 1.183, which equates to $10.1 billion in U.S. dollars.)	16.6 (Note: Saras reported 2022 revenues of €15.836 billion. The yearly average exchange rate for euros to U.S. dollars in 2022 was 1.0538, which equates to $16.6 billion in U.S. dollars.)
Cosmo Oil Company	Japan	22.4 (Note: Cosmo Energy's fiscal year runs from 1 April to 31 March. The revenues for 2017 are therefore for the fiscal year which ran 1 April 2017 to 31 March 2018.) (Note: Cosmo Energy reported 2017 revenues of ¥2.523 trillion. The yearly average exchange rate for Japanese yen to U.S. dollars in 2017 was 0.0089, which equates to $22.4 billion in U.S. dollars.)	25.2 (Note: Cosmo Energy's fiscal year runs from 1 April to 31 March. The revenues for 2018 are therefore for the fiscal year which ran 1 April 2018 to 31 March 2019.) (Note: Cosmo Energy reported 2018 revenues of ¥2.77 trillion. The yearly average exchange rate for Japanese yen to U.S. dollars in 2018 was 0.0091, which equates to $25.2 billion in U.S. dollars.)	25.1 (Note: Cosmo Energy's fiscal year runs from 1 April to 31 March. The revenues for 2019 are therefore for the fiscal year which ran 1 April 2019 to 31 March 2020.) (Note: Cosmo Energy reported 2019 revenues of ¥2.738 trillion. The yearly average exchange rate for Japanese yen to U.S. dollars in 2019 was 0.0092, which equates to $25.1 billion in U.S. dollars.)	20.9 (Note: Cosmo Energy's fiscal year runs from 1 April to 31 March. The revenues for 2020 are therefore for the fiscal year which ran 1 April 2020 to 31 March 2021.) (Note: Cosmo Energy reported 2020 revenues of ¥2.233 trillion. The yearly average exchange rate for Japanese yen to U.S. dollars in 2020 was 0.0094, which equates to $20.9 billion in U.S. dollars.)	22.2 (Note: Cosmo Energy's fiscal year runs from 1 April to 31 March. The revenues for 2021 are therefore for the fiscal year which ran 1 April 2021 to 31 March 2022.) (Note: Cosmo Energy reported 2021 revenues of ¥2.440 trillion. The yearly average exchange rate for Japanese yen to U.S. dollars in 2021 was 0.0091, which equates to $22.2 billion in U.S. dollars.)	21.4 (Note: Cosmo Energy's fiscal year runs from 1 April to 31 March. The revenues for 2022 are therefore for the fiscal year which ran 1 April 2022 to 31 March 2023.) (Note: Cosmo Energy reported 2022 revenues of ¥2.791 trillion. The yearly average exchange rate for Japanese yen to U.S. dollars in 2022 was 0.0077, which equates to $21.4 billion in U.S. dollars.)
Eneos Holdings	Japan	91.6 (Note: Eneos Holdings' fiscal year runs from 1 April to 31 March. The revenues for 2017 are therefore for the fiscal year which ran 1 April 2017 to 31 March 2018.) (Note: Eneos Holdigns reported 2017 revenues of ¥10.301 trillion. The yearly average exchange rate for Japanese yen to U.S. dollars in 2017 was 0.0089, which equates to $91.6 billion in U.S. dollars.)	101.2 (Note: Eneos Holdings' fiscal year runs from 1 April to 31 March. The revenues for 2018 are therefore for the fiscal year which ran 1 April 2018 to 31 March 2019.) (Note: Eneos Holdings reported 2018 revenues of ¥11.129 trillion. The yearly average exchange rate for Japanese yen to U.S. dollars in 2018 was 0.0091, which equates to $101.2 billion in U.S. dollars.)	92.1 (Note: Eneos Holdings' fiscal year runs from 1 April to 31 March. The revenues for 2019 are therefore for the fiscal year which ran 1 April 2019 to 31 March 2020.) (Note: Eneos Holdings reported 2019 revenues of ¥10.011 trillion. The yearly average exchange rate for Japanese yen to U.S. dollars in 2019 was 0.0092, which equates to $92.1 billion in U.S. dollars.)	71.9 (Note: Eneos Holdings' fiscal year runs from 1 April to 31 March. The revenues for 2020 are therefore for the fiscal year which ran 1 April 2020 to 31 March 2021.) (Note: Eneos Holdings reported 2020 revenues of ¥7.658 trillion. The yearly average exchange rate for Japanese yen to U.S. dollars in 2020 was 0.0094, which equates to $71.9 billion in U.S. dollars.)	99.3 (Note: Eneos Holdings' fiscal year runs from 1 April to 31 March. The revenues for 2021 are therefore for the fiscal year which ran 1 April 2021 to 31 March 2022.) (Note: Eneos Holdings reported 2021 revenues of ¥10.921 trillion. The yearly average exchange rate for Japanese yen to U.S. dollars in 2021 was 0.0091, which equates to $99.3 billion in U.S. dollars.)	115.6 (Note: Eneos Holdings' fiscal year runs from 1 April to 31 March. The revenues for 2022 are therefore for the fiscal year which ran 1 April 2022 to 31 March 2023.) (Note: Eneos Holdings reported 2022 revenues of ¥15.016 trillion. The yearly average exchange rate for Japanese yen to U.S. dollars in 2022 was 0.0077, which equates to $115.6 billion in U.S. dollars.)
Idemitsu Kosan	Japan	33.9 (Note: Idemitsu Kosan's fiscal year runs from 1 April to 31 March. The revenues for 2017 are therefore for the fiscal year which ran 1 April 2017 to 31 March 2018.) (Note: Idemitsu Kosan reported 2018 revenues of ¥37.306 trillion. The yearly average exchange rate for Japanese yen to U.S. dollars in 2018 was 0.0091, which equates to $33.9 billion in U.S. dollars.)	40.7 (Note: Idemitsu Kosan's fiscal year runs from 1 April to 31 March. The revenues for 2018 are therefore for the fiscal year which ran 1 April 2018 to 31 March 2019.) (Note: Idemitsu Kosan reported 2019 revenues of ¥44.251 trillion. The yearly average exchange rate for Japanese yen to U.S. dollars in 2019 was 0.0092, which equates to $40.7 billion in U.S. dollars.)	56.8 (Note: Idemitsu Kosan's fiscal year runs from 1 April to 31 March. The revenues for 2019 are therefore for the fiscal year which ran 1 April 2019 to 31 March 2020.) (Note: Idemitsu Kosan reported 2020 revenues of ¥60.458 trillion. The yearly average exchange rate for Japanese yen to U.S. dollars in 2020 was 0.0094, which equates to $56.8 billion in U.S. dollars.)	41.4 (Note: Idemitsu Kosan's fiscal year runs from 1 April to 31 March. The revenues for 2020 are therefore for the fiscal year which ran 1 April 2020 to 31 March 2021.) (Note: Idemitsu Kosan reported 2021 revenues of ¥45.566 trillion. The yearly average exchange rate for Japanese yen to U.S. dollars in 2021 was 0.0091, which equates to $41.4 billion in U.S. dollars.)	60.8 (Note: Idemitsu Kosan's fiscal year runs from 1 April to 31 March. The revenues for 2021 are therefore for the fiscal year which ran 1 April 2021 to 31 March 2022.) (Note: Idemitsu Kosan reported 2021 revenues of ¥66.867 trillion. The yearly average exchange rate for Japanese yen to U.S. dollars in 2021 was 0.0091, which equates to $60.8 billion in U.S. dollars.)	72.8 (Note: Idemitsu Kosan's fiscal year runs from 1 April to 31 March. The revenues for 2022 are therefore for the fiscal year which ran 1 April 2022 to 31 March 2023.) (Note: Idemitsu Kosan reported 2022 revenues of ¥9.456 trillion. The yearly average exchange rate for Japanese yen to U.S. dollars in 2022 was 0.0077, which equates to $72.8 billion in U.S. dollars.)
Inpex	Japan	7.7 (Note: Inpex's fiscal year ran from 1 April to 31 March. The revenues for 2017 are therefore for the fiscal year which ran 1 April 2017 to 31 March 2018.) (Note: Inpex reported 2017 revenues of ¥874.423 billion. The yearly average exchange rate for Japanese yen to U.S. dollars in 2017 was 0.0089, which equates to $7.7 billion in U.S. dollars.)	8.4 (Note: Inpex's fiscal year ran from 1 April to 31 March. The revenues for 2018 are therefore for the fiscal year which ran 1 April 2018 to 31 March 2019.) (Note: Inpex reported 2018 revenues of ¥933.701 billion. The yearly average exchange rate for Japanese yen to U.S. dollars in 2018 was 0.0091, which equates to $8.4 billion in U.S. dollars.)	9.2 (Note: Inpex reported 2019 revenues of ¥1.0 trillion. The yearly average exchange rate for Japanese yen to U.S. dollars in 2019 was 0.0092, which equates to $9.2 billion in U.S. dollars.)	7.2 (Note: Inpex reported 2020 revenues of ¥771.046 billion. The yearly average exchange rate for Japanese yen to U.S. dollars in 2020 was 0.0094, which equates to $7.2 billion in U.S. dollars.)	11.3 (Note: Inpex reported 2021 revenues of ¥1.244 trillion. The yearly average exchange rate for Japanese yen to U.S. dollars in 2021 was 0.0091, which equates to $11.3 billion in U.S. dollars.)	17.8 (Note: Inpex reported 2022 revenues of ¥2.324 billion. The yearly average exchange rate for Japanese yen to U.S. dollars in 2022 was 0.0077, which equates to $11.3 billion in U.S. dollars.)
KazMunayGas	Kazakhstan	16.5 (Note: KazMunayGas reported 2017 revenues of ₸5.351 trillion. The yearly average exchange rate for Kazakhstani tenge to U.S. dollars in 2017 was 0.0031, which equates to $16.5 billion in U.S. dollars.)	22.8 (Note: KazMunayGas reported 2018 revenues of ₸7.888 trillion. The yearly average exchange rate for Kazakhstani tenge to U.S. dollars in 2018 was 0.0029, which equates to $22.8 billion in U.S. dollars.)	20.7 (Note: KazMunayGas reported 2019 revenues of ₸7.970 trillion. The yearly average exchange rate for Kazakhstani tenge to U.S. dollars in 2019 was 0.0026, which equates to $20.7 billion in U.S. dollars.)	9.6 (Note: KazMunayGas reported 2020 revenues of ₸4.012 trillion. The yearly average exchange rate for Kazakhstani tenge to U.S. dollars in 2020 was 0.0024, which equates to $9.6 billion in U.S. dollars.)	15.5 (Note: KazMunayGas reported 2021 revenues of ₸6.742 trillion. The yearly average exchange rate for Kazakhstani tenge to U.S. dollars in 2021 was 0.0023, which equates to $15.5 billion in U.S. dollars.)	19.1 (Note: KazMunayGas reported 2022 revenues of ₸8.686 trillion. The yearly average exchange rate for Kazakhstani tenge to U.S. dollars in 2022 was 0.0022, which equates to $19.1 billion in U.S. dollars.)
Kuwait Petroleum Corporation	Kuwait	81.7	78.0	69.0	39.3	52.7	
National Oil Corporation	Libya		24.4	20.3	5.9 (Note: Militias under the control of Khalifa Haftar blocked the export of nearly all Libyan crude oil and natural gas from January 2020 to the end of September 2020, drastically reducing revenues.)	21.5	22.0
Petronas	Malaysia	52.0 (Note: Petronas reported 2017 revenues of RM223.622 billion. The yearly average exchange rate for Malaysian ringgit to U.S. dollars in 2017 was 0.2328, which equates to $52.0 billion in U.S. dollars.)	62.2 (Note: Petronas reported 2018 revenues of RM250.976 billion. The yearly average exchange rate for Malaysian ringgit to U.S. dollars in 2018 was 0.2479, which equates to $62.2 billion in U.S. dollars.)	58.0 (Note: Petronas reported 2019 revenues of RM240.263 billion. The yearly average exchange rate for Malaysian ringgit to U.S. dollars in 2019 was 0.2415, which equates to $58.0 billion in U.S. dollars.)	42.5 (Note: Petronas reported 2020 revenues of RM178.741 billion. The yearly average exchange rate for Malaysian ringgit to U.S. dollars in 2020 was 0.2382, which equates to $42.5 billion in U.S. dollars.)	59.8 (Note: Petronas reported 2021 revenues of RM247.962 billion. The yearly average exchange rate for Malaysian ringgit to U.S. dollars in 2021 was 0.2413, which equates to $59.8 billion in U.S. dollars.)	85.4 (Note: Petronas reported 2022 revenues of RM375.3 billion. The yearly average exchange rate for Malaysian ringgit to U.S. dollars in 2022 was 0.2276, which equates to $85.4 billion in U.S. dollars.)
Pemex	Mexico	70.6	85.4	74.3	47.8	72.6	122.7
Myanma Oil and Gas Enterprise	Myanmar	3.1 (Note: Myanma Oil and Gas Enterprise's fiscal year runs from 1 April to 31 March. The revenues for 2017 are therefore for the fiscal year which ran 1 April 2017 to 31 March 2018.)			0.9 (Note: Myanma Oil and Gas Enterprise's fiscal year runs from 1 April to 31 March. The revenues for 2020 are therefore for the fiscal year which ran 1 April 2020 to 31 March 2021.)	1.7	
SBM Offshore	Netherlands	1.2	1.7	2.9	2.9	3.7	4.9
Royal Vopak	Netherlands	1.5 (Note: Vopak reported 2017 revenues of €1.329 billion. The yearly average exchange rate for euros to U.S. dollars in 2017 was 1.1204, which equates to $1.5 billion in U.S. dollars.)	1.5 (Note: Vopak reported 2018 revenues of €1.286 billion. The yearly average exchange rate for euros to U.S. dollars in 2018 was 1.1811, which equates to $1.5 billion in U.S. dollars.)	1.7 (Note: Vopak reported 2019 revenues of €1.529 billion. The yearly average exchange rate for euros to U.S. dollars in 2019 was 1.1199, which equates to $1.7 billion in U.S. dollars.)	1.3 (Note: Vopak reported 2020 revenues of €1.190 billion. The yearly average exchange rate for euros to U.S. dollars in 2020 was 1.142, which equates to $1.3 billion in U.S. dollars.)	1.4 (Note: Vopak reported 2021 revenues of €1.227 billion. The yearly average exchange rate for euros to U.S. dollars in 2021 was 1.183, which equates to $1.4 billion in U.S. dollars.)	1.5 (Note: Vopak reported 2022 revenues of €1.431 billion. The yearly average exchange rate for euros to U.S. dollars in 2022 was 1.0538, which equates to $1.5 billion in U.S. dollars.)
Nigerian National Petroleum Corporation	Nigeria	0.2 (Note: Nigerian National Petroleum Corporation reported revenues of ₦82.4 billion in 2017. The average exchange rate for Nigerian naira to U.S. dollars was 0.003 in 2017, which equates to $0.237 billion.)	5.3 (Note: Nigerian National Petroleum Corporation reported revenues of ₦1.38 trillion in 2018. The average exchange rate for Nigerian naira to U.S. dollars was 0.0028 in 2018, which equates to $5.36 billion.)	12.9 (Note: Nigerian National Petroleum Corporation reported revenues of ₦4.63 trillion in 2019. The average exchange rate for Nigerian naira to U.S. dollars was 0.0028 in 2019, which equates to $12.96 billion.)	9.6 (Note: Nigerian National Petroleum Corporation reported revenues of ₦3.72 trillion in 2020. The average exchange rate for Nigerian naira to U.S. dollars was 0.0026 in 2020, which equates to $9.67 billion.)	16.0 (Note: Nigerian National Petroleum Corporation reported revenues of ₦6.42 trillion in 2021. The average exchange rate for Nigerian naira to U.S. dollars was 0.0025 in 2021, which equates to $16.0 billion.)	
Aker BP	Norway	2.5	3.7	3.3	2.9	5.6	13.0 (Note: Aker BP acquired Swedish petroleum company Lundin Energy in July 2022, making Aker BP the largest independent oil producer in Norway, by volume.)
Equinor	Norway	60.9	78.5	62.9	45.7	88.7	150.8
OQ	Oman	(Note: The Oman Oil Company was founded in 1996. It merged with Orpic, the Omani government's downstream petroleum company, in November 2018. Data in this list is for the successor company, OQ.)	23.0	19.0	14.0 (Note: OQ reported 2020 revenues of OMR5.393 billion. The yearly average exchange rate for Omani rials to U.S. dollars in 2020 was 2.5975, which equates to $14.0 billion in U.S. dollars.)	22.7 (Note: OQ reported 2021 revenues of OMR8.768 billion. The yearly average exchange rate for Omani rials to U.S. dollars in 2021 was 2.5973, which equates to $22.7 billion in U.S. dollars.)	39.1
Petroleum Development Oman	Oman				13.9 (Note: Petroleum Development Oman reported 2020 revenues of OMR5.383 billion. The yearly average exchange rate for Omani rials to U.S. dollars in 2020 was 2.5975, which equates to $13.9 billion in U.S. dollars.)	21.2 (Note: Petroleum Development Oman reported 2021 revenues of OMR8.183 billion. The yearly average exchange rate for Omani rials to U.S. dollars in 2021 was 2.5973, which equates to $21.2 billion in U.S. dollars.)	28.6 (Note: Petroleum Development Oman reported 2022 revenues of OMR11.014 billion. The yearly average exchange rate for Omani rials to U.S. dollars in 2022 was 2.5974, which equates to $28.6 billion in U.S. dollars.)
Pakistan State Oil	Pakistan	10.4 (Note: Pakistan State Oil reported 2017 revenues of Rs1.096 trillion. The yearly average exchange rate for Pakistani rupees to U.S. dollars in 2017 was 0.0095, which equates to $10.4 billion in U.S. dollars.)	10.8 (Note: Pakistan State Oil reported 2018 revenues of Rs1.312 trillion. The yearly average exchange rate for Pakistani rupees to U.S. dollars in 2018 was 0.0083, which equates to $10.8 billion in U.S. dollars.)	8.9 (Note: Pakistan State Oil reported 2019 revenues of Rs1.340 trillion. The yearly average exchange rate for Pakistani rupees to U.S. dollars in 2019 was 0.0067, which equates to $8.9 billion in U.S. dollars.)	8.0 (Note: Pakistan State Oil reported 2020 revenues of Rs1.302 trillion. The yearly average exchange rate for Pakistani rupees to U.S. dollars in 2020 was 0.0062, which equates to $8.0 billion in U.S. dollars.)	8.6 (Note: Pakistan State Oil reported 2021 revenues of Rs1.424 trillion. The yearly average exchange rate for Pakistani rupees to U.S. dollars in 2021 was 0.0061, which equates to $8.6 billion in U.S. dollars.)	13.2 (Note: Pakistan State Oil reported 2022 revenues of Rs2.697 trillion. The yearly average exchange rate for Pakistani rupees to U.S. dollars in 2022 was 0.0049, which equates to $13.2 billion in U.S. dollars.)
Petroperú	Peru	4.0	4.9	4.6	3.1	4.2	5.5
Grupa Lotos	Poland	6.4 (Note: Grupa Lotos reported 2017 revenues of zł24.187 billion. The yearly average exchange rate for Polish złotys to U.S. dollars in 2017 was 0.2657, which equates to $6.4 billion in U.S. dollars.)	8.3 (Note: Grupa Lotos reported 2018 revenues of zł30.03 billion. The yearly average exchange rate for Polish złotys to U.S. dollars in 2018 was 0.2773, which equates to $8.3 billion in U.S. dollars.)	7.7 (Note: Grupa Lotos reported 2019 revenues of zł29.362 billion. The yearly average exchange rate for Polish złotys to U.S. dollars in 2019 was 0.2606, which equates to $7.7 billion in U.S. dollars.)	5.4 (Note: Grupa Lotos reported 2020 revenues of zł21.149 billion. The yearly average exchange rate for Polish złotys to U.S. dollars in 2020 was 0.257, which equates to $5.4 billion in U.S. dollars.)	8.6 (Note: Grupa Lotos reported 2021 revenues of zł33.158 billion. The yearly average exchange rate for Polish złotys to U.S. dollars in 2021 was 0.2592, which equates to $8.6 billion in U.S. dollars.)	(Note: Grupa Lotos merged with PKN Orlen in June 2022.)
PGNiG	Poland	9.5 (Note: PGNiG reported 2017 revenues of zł35.857 billion. The yearly average exchange rate for Polish złotys to U.S. dollars in 2017 was 0.2657, which equates to $9.5 billion in U.S. dollars.)	11.4 (Note: PNGiG reported 2018 revenues of zł41.234 billion. The yearly average exchange rate for Polish złotys to U.S. dollars in 2018 was 0.2773, which equates to $11.4 billion in U.S. dollars.)	10.9 (Note: PNGiG reported 2019 revenues of zł42.023 billion. The yearly average exchange rate for Polish złotys to U.S. dollars in 2019 was 0.2606, which equates to $10.9 billion in U.S. dollars.)	10.0 (Note: PGNiG reported 2020 revenues of zł39.197 billion. The yearly average exchange rate for Polish złotys to U.S. dollars in 2020 was 0.257, which equates to $10.0 billion in U.S. dollars.)	18.1 (Note: PGNiG reported 2021 revenues of zł69.964 billion. The yearly average exchange rate for Polish złotys to U.S. dollars in 2021 was 0.2592, which equates to $18.1 billion in U.S. dollars.)	(Note: PGNiG merged with PKN Orlen in October 2022.)
PKN Orlen	Poland	25.3 (Note: PKN Orlen reported 2017 revenues of zł95.364 billion. The yearly average exchange rate for Polish złotys to U.S. dollars in 2017 was 0.2657, which equates to $25.3 billion in U.S. dollars.)	30.4 (Note: PKN Orlen reported 2018 revenues of zł109.706 billion. The yearly average exchange rate for Polish złotys to U.S. dollars in 2018 was 0.2773, which equates to $30.4 billion in U.S. dollars.)	28.9 (Note: PKN Orlen reported 2019 revenues of zł109.706 billion. The yearly average exchange rate for Polish złotys to U.S. dollars in 2019 was 0.2606, which equates to $28.9 billion in U.S. dollars.)	22.1 (Note: PKN Orlen reported 2020 revenues of zł86.18 billion. The yearly average exchange rate for Polish złotys to U.S. dollars in 2020 was 0.257, which equates to $22.1 billion in U.S. dollars.)	32.3 (Note: PKN Orlen reported 2021 revenues of zł131.592 billion. The yearly average exchange rate for Polish złotys to U.S. dollars in 2021 was 0.2592, which equates to $32.3 billion in U.S. dollars.)	62.6 (Note: PKN Orlen reported 2022 revenues of zł278.509 billion. The yearly average exchange rate for Polish złotys to U.S. dollars in 2022 was 0.2251, which equates to $62.6 billion in U.S. dollars.)
Galp Energia	Portugal	17.3 (Note: Galp Energia reported 2017 revenues of €15.307 billion. The yearly average exchange rate for euros to U.S. dollars in 2017 was 1.1304, which equates to $17.3 billion in U.S. dollars.)	20.6 (Note: Galp Energia reported 2018 revenues of €17.470 billion. The yearly average exchange rate for euros to U.S. dollars in 2018 was 1.1811, which equates to $20.6 billion in U.S. dollars.)	19.2 (Note: Galp Energia reported 2019 revenues of €17.182 billion. The yearly average exchange rate for euros to U.S. dollars in 2019 was 1.1199, which equates to $19.2 billion in U.S. dollars.)	13.5 (Note: Galp Energia reported 2020 revenues of €11.840 billion. The yearly average exchange rate for euros to U.S. dollars in 2020 was 1.142, which equates to $13.5 billion in U.S. dollars.)	19.5 (Note: Galp Energia reported 2021 revenues of €16.552 billion. The yearly average exchange rate for euros to U.S. dollars in 2021 was 1.183, which equates to $19.5 billion in U.S. dollars.)	28.6 (Note: Galp Energia reported 2022 revenues of €27.160 billion. The yearly average exchange rate for euros to U.S. dollars in 2022 was 1.0538, which equates to $28.6 billion in U.S. dollars.)
Nakilat	Qatar	0.9 (Note: Nakilat reported 2017 revenues of QAR3.618 billion. The yearly average exchange rate for Qatari riyals to U.S. dollars in 2017 was 0.2721, which equates to $0.9 billion in U.S. dollars.)	0.9 (Note: Nakilat reported 2018 revenues of QAR3.635 billion. The yearly average exchange rate for Qatari riyals to U.S. dollars in 2018 was 0.2746, which equates to $0.9 billion in U.S. dollars.)	1.0 (Note: Nakilat reported 2019 revenues of QAR3.883 billion. The yearly average exchange rate for Qatari riyals to U.S. dollars in 2019 was 0.2747, which equates to $1.0 billion in U.S. dollars.)	1.1 (Note: Nakilat reported 2020 revenues of QAR4.016 billion. The yearly average exchange rate for Qatari riyals to U.S. dollars in 2020 was 0.2746, which equates to $1.1 billion in U.S. dollars.)	1.1 (Note: Nakilat reported 2021 revenues of QAR4.141 billion. The yearly average exchange rate for Qatari riyals to U.S. dollars in 2021 was 0.2744, which equates to $1.1 billion in U.S. dollars.)	1.2 (Note: Nakilat reported 2022 revenues of QAR4.401 billion. The yearly average exchange rate for Qatari riyals to U.S. dollars in 2022 was 0.2745, which equates to $1.2 billion in U.S. dollars.)
QatarEnergy	Qatar	25.9 (Note: Qatar Petroleum (renamed QatarEnergy in 2021) reported revenues of QAR95.2 billion. The yearly average exchange rate for Qatari riyals to U.S. dollars in 2017 was 0.2721, which equates to $25.9 billion in U.S. dollars.)	29.9 (Note: Qatar Petroleum (renamed QatarEnergy in 2021) reported 2018 revenues of QAR108.8 billion. The yearly average exchange rate for Qatari riyals to U.S. dollars in 2018 was 0.2746, which equates to $29.9 billion in U.S. dollars.)	29.8 (Note: Qatar Petroleum (renamed QatarEnergy in 2021) reported 2019 revenues of QAR108.3 billion. The yearly average exchange rate for Qatari riyals to U.S. dollars in 2019 was 0.2747, which equates to $29.8 billion in U.S. dollars.)	21.0 (Note: Qatar Petroleum (renamed QatarEnergy in 2021) reported 2020 revenues of QAR76.4 billion. The yearly average exchange rate for Qatari riyals to U.S. dollars in 2020 was 0.2746, which equates to $21.0 billion in U.S. dollars.)	34.9 (Note: QatarEnergy reported 2021 revenues of QAR127.35 billion. The yearly average exchange rate for Qatari riyals to U.S. dollars in 2021 was 0.2744, which equates to $34.9 billion in U.S. dollars.)	53.8 (Note: QatarEnergy reported 2022 revenues of QAR196.135 billion. The yearly average exchange rate for Qatari riyals to U.S. dollars in 2022 was 0.2745, which equates to $53.8 billion in U.S. dollars.)
OMV Petrom	Romania	4.7	5.7	6.0	4.6	6.2	13.1 (Note: OMV Petrom reported 2022 revenues of ROM61.344 billion. The yearly average exchange rate for Romanian leu to U.S. dollars in 2022 was 0.2137, which equates to $13.1 billion in U.S. dollars.)
Gazprom	Russia	112.5 (Note: Gazprom reported 2017 revenues of ₽6.546 trillion. The yearly average exchange rate for Russian rubles to U.S. dollars in 2017 was 0.0172, which equates to $112.5 billion in U.S. dollars.)	131.5 (Note: Gazprom reported 2018 revenues of ₽8.224 trillion. The yearly average exchange rate for Russian rubles to U.S. dollars in 2018 was 0.016, which equates to $131.5 billion in U.S. dollars.)	118.7 (Note: Gazprom reported 2019 revenues of ₽7.659 trillion. The yearly average exchange rate for Russian rubles to U.S. dollars in 2019 was 0.0155, which equates to $118.7 billion in U.S. dollars.)	87.8 (Note: Gazprom reported 2020 revenues of ₽6.321 trillion. The yearly average exchange rate for Russian rubles to U.S. dollars in 2020 was 0.0139, which equates to $87.8 billion in U.S. dollars.)	138.7 (Note: Gazprom reported 2021 revenues of ₽10.2 trillion. The yearly average exchange rate for Russian rubles to U.S. dollars in 2021 was 0.0136, which equates to $138.7 billion in U.S. dollars.)	80.0 (Note: Revenue estimates were made by the news agency Reuters, as Gazprom no longer provides complete data on revenues, earnings, and exports.)
Lukoil	Russia	102.1 (Note: Lukoil reported 2017 revenues of ₽5.936 trillion. The yearly average exchange rate for Russian rubles to U.S. dollars in 2017 was 0.0172, which equates to $102.1 billion in U.S. dollars.)	128.5 (Note: Lukoil reported 2018 revenues of ₽8.035 trillion. The yearly average exchange rate for Russian rubles to U.S. dollars in 2018 was 0.016, which equates to $128.5 billion in U.S. dollars.)	121.5 (Note: Lukoil reported 2019 revenues of ₽7.841 trillion. The yearly average exchange rate for Russian rubles to U.S. dollars in 2019 was 0.0155, which equates to $121.5 billion in U.S. dollars.)	78.3 (Note: Lukoil reported 2020 revenues of ₽5.639 trillion. The yearly average exchange rate for Russian rubles to U.S. dollars in 2020 was 0.0139, which equates to $78.3 billion in U.S. dollars.)	128.3 (Note: Lukoil reported 2021 revenues of ₽9.435 trillion. The yearly average exchange rate for Russian rubles to U.S. dollars in 2021 was 0.0136, which equates to $128.3 billion in U.S. dollars.)	
Novatek	Russia	9.9 (Note: Novatek reported 2017 revenues of ₽579.819 billion. The yearly average exchange rate for Russian rubles to U.S. dollars in 2017 was 0.0172, which equates to $9.9 billion in U.S. dollars.)	13.3 (Note: Novatek reported 2018 revenues of ₽831.758 billion. The yearly average exchange rate for Russian rubles to U.S. dollars in 2018 was 0.016, which equates to $13.3 billion in U.S. dollars.)	13.3 (Note: Novatek reported 2019 revenues of ₽862.803 billion. The yearly average exchange rate for Russian rubles to U.S. dollars in 2019 was 0.0155, which equates to $13.3 billion in U.S. dollars.)	9.8 (Note: Novatek reported 2020 revenues of ₽711.812 billion. The yearly average exchange rate for Russian rubles to U.S. dollars in 2020 was 0.0139, which equates to $9.8 billion in U.S. dollars.)	15.7 (Note: Novatek reported 2021 revenues of ₽1.156 trillion. The yearly average exchange rate for Russian rubles to U.S. dollars in 2021 was 0.0136, which equates to $15.7 billion in U.S. dollars.)	
Rosneft	Russia	84.1 (Note: Rosneft reported 2017 revenues of ₽4.892 trillion. The yearly average exchange rate for Russian rubles to U.S. dollars in 2017 was 0.0172, which equates to $84.1 billion in U.S. dollars.)	131.8 (Note: Novatek reported 2018 revenues of ₽8.238 billion. The yearly average exchange rate for Russian rubles to U.S. dollars in 2018 was 0.016, which equates to $131.8 billion in U.S. dollars.)	134.4 (Note: Rosneft reported 2019 revenues of ₽8.676 trillion. The yearly average exchange rate for Russian rubles to U.S. dollars in 2019 was 0.0155, which equates to $134.4 billion in U.S. dollars.)	83.1 (Note: Rosneft initially reported 2020 revenues of ₽4.835 trillion, but restated its results after settlement of actual prices and exchange rates and reported revenues of ₽5.757 trillion, or US$83.1 billion.)	121.1	124.9
Sovcomflot	Russia	1.4	1.5	1.6	1.5	1.6	
Surgutneftegas	Russia	20.2 (Note: Surgutneftegas reported 2017 revenues of ₽1.175 trillion. The yearly average exchange rate for Russian rubles to U.S. dollars in 2017 was 0.0172, which equates to $20.2 billion in U.S. dollars.)	24.8 (Note: Surgutneftegas reported 2018 revenues of ₽1.555 trillion. The yearly average exchange rate for Russian rubles to U.S. dollars in 2018 was 0.016, which equates to $24.8 billion in U.S. dollars.)	24.3 (Note: Surgutneftegas reported 2019 revenues of ₽1.57 trillion. The yearly average exchange rate for Russian rubles to U.S. dollars in 2019 was 0.0155, which equates to $24.3 billion in U.S. dollars.)	14.9 (Note: Surgutneftegas reported 2020 revenues of ₽1.075 trillion. The yearly average exchange rate for Russian rubles to U.S. dollars in 2020 was 0.0139, which equates to $14.9 billion in U.S. dollars.)	25.6 (Note: Surgutneftegas reported 2021 revenues of ₽1.888 trillion. The yearly average exchange rate for Russian rubles to U.S. dollars in 2021 was 0.0136, which equates to $25.6 billion in U.S. dollars.)	
Tatneft	Russia	11.7 (Note: Tatneft reported 2017 revenues of ₽681.195 billion. The yearly average exchange rate for Russian rubles to U.S. dollars in 2017 was 0.0172, which equates to $11.7 billion in U.S. dollars.)	14.5 (Note: Tatneft reported 2018 revenues of ₽910.534 billion. The yearly average exchange rate for Russian rubles to U.S. dollars in 2018 was 0.016, which equates to $14.5 billion in U.S. dollars.)	14.4 (Note: Tatneft reported 2019 revenues of ₽932.296 billion. The yearly average exchange rate for Russian rubles to U.S. dollars in 2019 was 0.0155, which equates to $14.4 billion in U.S. dollars.)	10.0 (Note: Tatneft reported 2020 revenues of ₽720.677 billion. The yearly average exchange rate for Russian rubles to U.S. dollars in 2020 was 0.0139, which equates to $10.0 billion in U.S. dollars.)	13.6	
Transneft	Russia	15.2 (Note: Transneft reported 2017 revenues of ₽884.337 billion. The yearly average exchange rate for Russian rubles to U.S. dollars in 2017 was 0.0172, which equates to $15.2 billion in U.S. dollars.)	15.6 (Note: Transneft reported 2018 revenues of ₽979.958 billion. The yearly average exchange rate for Russian rubles to U.S. dollars in 2018 was 0.016, which equates to $15.6 billion in U.S. dollars.)	16.4 (Note: Transneft reported 2019 revenues of ₽1.0 trillion. The yearly average exchange rate for Russian rubles to U.S. dollars in 2019 was 0.0155, which equates to $16.4 billion in U.S. dollars.)	13.3 (Note: Transneft reported 2020 revenues of ₽962.440 billion. The yearly average exchange rate for Russian rubles to U.S. dollars in 2020 was 0.0139, which equates to $13.3 billion in U.S. dollars.)	14.6 (Note: Transneft reported preliminary 2021 revenues of ₽1.077 billion. The yearly average exchange rate for Russian rubles to U.S. dollars in 2021 was 0.0136, which equates to $14.6 billion in U.S. dollars.)	
Bahri	Saudi Arabia	1.6 (Note: Bahri reported 2017 revenues of SAR6.045 billion. The yearly average exchange rate for Saudi riyal to U.S. dollars in 2017 was 0.2667, which equates to $1.6 billion in U.S. dollars.)	1.6 (Note: Bahri reported 2018 revenues of SAR6.129 billion. The yearly average exchange rate for Saudi riyal to U.S. dollars in 2018 was 0.2666, which equates to $1.6 billion in U.S. dollars.)	1.7 (Note: Bahri reported 2019 revenues of SAR6.567 billion. The yearly average exchange rate for Saudi riyal to U.S. dollars in 2019 was 0.2666, which equates to $1.7 billion in U.S. dollars.)	2.2 (Note: Bahri reported 2020 revenues of SAR8.393 billion. The yearly average exchange rate for Saudi riyal to U.S. dollars in 2020 was 0.2665, which equates to $2.2 billion in U.S. dollars.)	1.4 (Note: Bahri reported 2021 revenues of SAR5.351 billion. The yearly average exchange rate for Saudi riyal to U.S. dollars in 2021 was 0.2666, which equates to $1.4 billion in U.S. dollars.)	2.2 (Note: Bahri reported 2022 revenues of SAR8.582 billion. The yearly average exchange rate for Saudi riyal to U.S. dollars in 2022 was 0.2663, which equates to $2.2 billion in U.S. dollars.)
Saudi Aramco	Saudi Arabia	264.1	359.2	329.8	229.8	400.4	604.3
Sasol	South Africa	12.9 (Note: Sasol's fiscal year ran from 1 July to 30 June. The revenues for 2017 are therefore for the fiscal year which ran 1 July 2016 to 30 June 2017.) (Note: Sasol reported 2016-2017 revenues of R172.061 billion. The yearly average exchange rate for South African rand to U.S. dollars in 2017 was 0.0752, which equates to $12.9 billion in U.S. dollars.)	13.5 (Note: Sasol's fiscal year ran from 1 July to 30 June. The revenues for 2018 are therefore for the fiscal year which ran 1 July 2017 to 30 June 2018.) (Note: Sasol reported 2017-2018 revenues of R178.612 billion. The yearly average exchange rate for South African rand to U.S. dollars in 2018 was 0.076, which equates to $13.5 billion in U.S. dollars.)	14.1 (Note: Sasol's fiscal year ran from 1 July to 30 June. The revenues for 2019 are therefore for the fiscal year which ran 1 July 2018 to 30 June 2019.) (Note: Sasol reported 2018-2019 revenues of R203.613 billion. The yearly average exchange rate for South African rand to U.S. dollars in 2019 was 0.0693, which equates to $14.1 billion in U.S. dollars.)	12.0 (Note: Sasol's fiscal year ran from 1 July to 30 June. The revenues for 2020 are therefore for the fiscal year which ran 1 July 2019 to 30 June 2020.) (Note: Sasol reported 2019-2020 revenues of R196.798 billion. The yearly average exchange rate for South African rand to U.S. dollars in 2020 was 0.0611, which equates to $12.0 billion in U.S. dollars.)	13.1 (Note: Sasol's fiscal year ran from 1 July to 30 June. The revenues for 2021 are therefore for the fiscal year which ran 1 July 2020 to 30 June 2021.) (Note: Sasol reported 2020-2021 revenues of R194.712 billion. The yearly average exchange rate for South African rand to U.S. dollars in 2021 was 0.0677, which equates to $13.1 billion in U.S. dollars.)	15.3
GS Caltex	South Korea	27.2 (Note: GS Caltex reported 2017 revenues of ₩30.3 trillion. The yearly average exchange rate for South Korean won to U.S. dollars in 2017 was 0.0009, which equates to $27.2 billion in U.S. dollars.)	32.7 (Note: GS Caltex had 2018 revenues of ₩36.3 trillion. The yearly average exchange rate for South Korean won to U.S. dollars in 2018 was 0.0009, which equates to $32.7 billion in U.S. dollars.)	29.9 (Note: GS Caltex reported 2019 revenues of ₩33.2 trillion. The yearly average exchange rate for South Korean won to U.S. dollars in 2019 was 0.0009, which equates to $29.9 billion in U.S. dollars.)	17.8 (Note: GS Caltex reported 2020 revenues of ₩22.3 trillion. The yearly average exchange rate for South Korean won to U.S. dollars in 2020 was 0.0008, which equates to $17.8 billion in U.S. dollars.)	31.0 (Note: GS Caltex reported 2021 revenues of ₩34.5 trillion. The yearly average exchange rate for South Korean won to U.S. dollars in 2021 was 0.0009, which equates to $31.0 billion in U.S. dollars.)	46.8 (Note: GS Caltex reported 2022 revenues of ₩58.532 trillion. The yearly average exchange rate for South Korean won to U.S. dollars in 2022 was 0.0008, which equates to $46.8 billion in U.S. dollars.)
Korea National Oil Corporation	South Korea	2.9 (Note: Korea National Oil Corporation reported 2017 revenues of ₩2.312 trillion. The yearly average exchange rate for South Korean won to U.S. dollars in 2017 was 0.0009, which equates to $2.0 billion in U.S. dollars.)	2.8 (Note: Korea National Oil Corporation had 2018 revenues of ₩3.149 trillion. The yearly average exchange rate for South Korean won to U.S. dollars in 2018 was 0.0009, which equates to $2.8 billion in U.S. dollars.)	2.6 (Note: Korea National Oil Corporation reported 2019 revenues of ₩2.929 trillion. The yearly average exchange rate for South Korean won to U.S. dollars in 2019 was 0.0009, which equates to $2.6 billion in U.S. dollars.)	1.5 (Note: Korea National Oil Corporation reported 2020 revenues of ₩1.831 trillion. The yearly average exchange rate for South Korean won to U.S. dollars in 2020 was 0.0008, which equates to $1.5 billion in U.S. dollars.)	1.9 (Note: Korea National Oil Corporation reported 2021 revenues of ₩2.155 trillion. The yearly average exchange rate for South Korean won to U.S. dollars in 2021 was 0.0009, which equates to $1.9 billion in U.S. dollars.)	1.5
SK Innovation	South Korea	41.2	48.7	45.3	31.4	42.1 (Note: SK Innovation reported 2021 revenues of ₩46.842 trillion. The yearly average exchange rate for South Korean won to U.S. dollars in 2021 was 0.0009, which equates to $42.1 billion in U.S. dollars.)	64.4 (Note: SK Innovation reported 2022 revenues of ₩78.05 trillion. The yearly average exchange rate for South Korean won to U.S. dollars in 2022 was 0.0008, which equates to $64.4 billion in U.S. dollars.)
CEPSA	Spain	20.5 (Note: CEPSA reported 2017 revenues of €18.211 billion. The yearly average exchange rate for euros to U.S. dollars in 2017 was 1.1304, which equates to $20.5 billion in U.S. dollars.)	26.0 (Note: CEPSA reported 2018 revenues of €22.078 billion. The yearly average exchange rate for euros to U.S. dollars in 2018 was 1.1811, which equates to $26.0 billion in U.S. dollars.)	23.6 (Note: CEPSA reported 2019 revenues of €21.157 billion. The yearly average exchange rate for euros to U.S. dollars in 2019 was 1.1199, which equates to $23.6 billion in U.S. dollars.)	15.5 (Note: CEPSA reported 2020 revenues of €34.963 billion. The yearly average exchange rate for euros to U.S. dollars in 2020 was 1.142, which equates to $15.5 billion in U.S. dollars.)	26.4 (Note: CEPSA reported 2021 revenues of €22.335 billion. The yearly average exchange rate for euros to U.S. dollars in 2021 was 1.183, which equates to $26.4 billion in U.S. dollars.)	32.8 (Note: CEPSA reported 2022 revenues of €33.446 billion. The yearly average exchange rate for euros to U.S. dollars in 2022 was 1.0538, which equates to $32.8 billion in U.S. dollars.)
Repsol	Spain	49.1 (Note: Repsol reported 2017 revenues of €43.448 billion. The yearly average exchange rate for euros to U.S. dollars in 2017 was 1.1304, which equates to $49.1 billion in U.S. dollars.)	59.3 (Note: Repsol reported 2018 revenues of €50.211 billion. The yearly average exchange rate for euros to U.S. dollars in 2018 was 1.1811, which equates to $59.3 billion in U.S. dollars.)	57.2 (Note: Repsol reported 2019 revenues of €51.138 billion. The yearly average exchange rate for euros to U.S. dollars in 2019 was 1.1199, which equates to $57.2 billion in U.S. dollars.)	39.9 (Note: Repsol reported 2020 revenues of €34.963 billion. The yearly average exchange rate for euros to U.S. dollars in 2020 was 1.142, which equates to $39.9 billion in U.S. dollars.)	61.6 (Note: Repsol reported 2021 revenues of €52.130 billion. The yearly average exchange rate for euros to U.S. dollars in 2021 was 1.183, which equates to $61.6 billion in U.S. dollars.)	82.9 (Note: Repsol reported 2022 revenues of €78.724 billion. The yearly average exchange rate for euros to U.S. dollars in 2022 was 1.0538, which equates to $82.9 billion in U.S. dollars.)
Lundin Energy	Sweden	1.9	2.6	2.9	2.5	5.4	(Note: Lundin Energy was purchased by the Norwegian oil and gas company Aker BP in July 2022.)
Puma Energy	Switzerland	15.1	15.3	14.5	8.1	10.9	15.8
CPC Corporation	Taiwan	29.1 (Note: CPC Corporation reported 2017 revenues of NT$886.989 billion. The yearly average exchange rate for New Taiwan dollars to U.S. dollars in 2017 was 0.0329, which equates to $29.1 billion in U.S. dollars.)	33.9 (Note: CPC Corporation reported 2018 revenues of NT$1.022 trillion. The yearly average exchange rate for New Taiwan dollars to U.S. dollars in 2018 was 0.0332, which equates to $33.9 billion in U.S. dollars.)	32.5 (Note: CPC corporation reported 2019 revenues of NT$1.004 trillion. The yearly average exchange rate for New Taiwan dollars to U.S. dollars in 2019 was 0.0324, which equates to $32.5 billion in U.S. dollars.)	24.2 (Note: CPC Corporation reported 2020 revenues of NT$713.747 billion. The yearly average exchange rate for New Taiwan dollars to U.S. dollars in 2020 was 0.034, which equates to $24.2 billion in U.S. dollars.)	31.9 (Note: CPC Corporation reported 2021 revenues of NT$891.90 billion. The yearly average exchange rate for New Taiwan dollars to U.S. dollars in 2021 was 0.0358, which equates to $31.9 billion in U.S. dollars.)	41.0 (Note: CPC Corporation reported 2022 revenues of NT$1.221 trillion. The yearly average exchange rate for New Taiwan dollars to U.S. dollars in 2022 was 0.0336, which equates to $41.0 billion in U.S. dollars.)
Formosa Petrochemical	Taiwan	20.5 (Note: Formosa Petrochemical reported 2017 revenues of NT$624.108 billion. The yearly average exchange rate for New Taiwan dollars to U.S. dollars in 2017 was 0.0329, which equates to $20.5 billion in U.S. dollars.)	25.4 (Note: Formosa Petrochemical reported 2018 revenues of NT$767.550 billion. The yearly average exchange rate for New Taiwan dollars to U.S. dollars in 2018 was 0.0332, which equates to $25.4 billion in U.S. dollars.)	20.9 (Note: Formosa Petrochemical reported 2019 revenues of NT$646.023 billion. The yearly average exchange rate for New Taiwan dollars to U.S. dollars in 2019 was 0.0324, which equates to $20.9 billion in U.S. dollars.)	14.1 (Note: Formosa Petrochemical reported 2020 revenues of NT$415.282 billion. The yearly average exchange rate for New Taiwan dollars to U.S. dollars in 2020 was 0.034, which equates to $14.1 billion in U.S. dollars.)	22.1 (Note: Formosa Petrochemical reported 2021 revenues of NT$620.062 billion. The yearly average exchange rate for New Taiwan dollars to U.S. dollars in 2021 was 0.0358, which equates to $22.1 billion in U.S. dollars.)	28.4 (Note: Formosa Petrochemical reported 2022 revenues of NT$848.048 billion. The yearly average exchange rate for New Taiwan dollars to U.S. dollars in 2022 was 0.0336, which equates to $28.4 billion in U.S. dollars.)
PTT	Thailand	60.3 (Note: PTT reported an audited grand total of all revenue of ฿2.044 trillion in 2017. The average exchange rate for Thai baht to U.S. dollars was 0.0295 in 2017, which equates to $60.3 billion in U.S. dollars.)	73.4 (Note: PTT reported revenues of ฿2.367 trillion in 2018. The average exchange rate for Thai baht to U.S. dollars was 0.031 in 2018, which equates to $73.4 billion in U.S. dollars.)	72.8 (Note: PTT reported revenues of ฿2.261 trillion in 2019. The average exchange rate for Thai baht to U.S. dollars was 0.0322 in 2019, which equates to $72.8 billion in U.S. dollars.)	51.7 (Note: PTT reported revenues of ฿1.615 trillion in 2020. The average exchange rate for U.S. dollars to the Thai baht was 0.032 in 2020, which equates to $61.7 billion in U.S. dollars.)	70.7 (Note: PTT reported revenues of ฿2.258 trillion in 2021. The average exchange rate for Thai baht to U.S. dollars was 0.0313 in 2021, which equates to $70.7 billion in U.S. dollars.)	96.3 (Note: PTT reported revenus of ฿3.367 trillion in 2022. The average exchange rate for Thai baht to U.S. dollars was 0.0286 in 2022, which equates to $24.2 billion in U.S. dollars.)
Trinidad Petroleum Holdings	Trinidad and Tobago	2.9 (Note: Trinidad Petroleum Holdings' fiscal year runs from 1 October to 30 September. The revenues for 2017 are therefore for the fiscal year which ran 1 October 2016 to 30 September 2017.) (Note: Trinidad Petroleum Holdings reported revenues of TT$20.035 billion in 2017. The average exchange rate for Trinidad and Tobago dollars to U.S. dollars was 0.1486 in 2017, which equates to $2.9 billion in U.S. dollars.)	3.6 (Note: Trinidad Petroleum Holdings' fiscal year runs from 1 October to 30 September. The revenues for 2018 are therefore for the fiscal year which ran 1 October 2017 to 30 September 2018.) (Note: Trinidad Petroleum Holdings reported revenues of TT$24.542 billion in 2018. The average exchange rate for Trinidad and Tobago dollars to U.S. dollars was 0.1483 in 2018, which equates to $3.6 billion in U.S. dollars.)	0.7 (Note: Trinidad Petroleum Holdings' fiscal year runs from 1 October to 30 September. The revenues for 2019 are therefore for the fiscal year which ran 1 October 2018 to 30 September 2019.) (Note: Trinidad Petroleum Holdings reported revenues of TT$5.398 billion in 2019. The average exchange rate for Trinidad and Tobago dollars to U.S. dollars was 0.1476 in 2019, which equates to $0.7 billion in U.S. dollars.)	0.7 (Note: Trinidad Petroleum Holdings' fiscal year runs from 1 October to 30 September. The revenues for 2020 are therefore for the fiscal year which ran 1 October 2019 to 30 September 2020.) (Note: Trinidad Petroleum Holdings reported revenues of TT$4.739 billion in 2020. The average exchange rate for Trinidad and Tobago dollars to U.S. dollars was 0.1478 in 2020, which equates to $0.7 billion in U.S. dollars.)	1.0 (Note: Trinidad Petroleum Holdings' fiscal year runs from 1 October to 30 September. The revenues for 2021 are therefore for the fiscal year which ran 1 October 2020 to 30 September 2021.) (Note: Trinidad Petroleum Holdings reported revenues of TT$6.827 billion in 2021. The average exchange rate for Trinidad and Tobago dollars to U.S. dollars was 0.1473 in 2021, which equates to $1.0 billion in U.S. dollars.)	1.4 (Note: Trinidad Petroleum Holdings' fiscal year runs from 1 October to 30 September. The revenues for 2022 are therefore for the fiscal year which ran 1 October 2021 to 30 September 2022.) (Note: Trinidad Petroleum Holdings reported revenues of TT$6.827 billion in 2022. The average exchange rate for Trinidad and Tobago dollars to U.S. dollars was 0.1473 in 2022, which equates to $1.4 billion in U.S. dollars.)
TPAO	Turkey	1.6	2.0	1.0	0.7	0.7 (Note: TPAO reported revenues of ₺11.925 billion in 2022. The average exchange rate for Turkish lira to U.S. dollars was 0.0612 in 2022, which equates to $0.7 billion in U.S. dollars.)	
Naftogaz	Ukraine	8.5 (Note: Naftogaz reported revenues of грн227.478 billion in 2017. The average exchange rate for Ukrainian hryvnia to U.S. dollars was 0.0376 in 2017, which equates to $8.5 billion in U.S. dollars.)	9.4 (Note: Naftogaz reported revenues of грн256.312 billion in 2018. The average exchange rate for Ukrainian hryvnia to U.S. dollars was 0.0368 in 2018, which equates to $9.4 billion in U.S. dollars.)	5.8 (Note: Naftogaz reported revenues of грн149.781 billion in 2019. The average exchange rate for Ukrainian hryvnia to U.S. dollars was 0.0388 in 2019, which equates to $5.8 billion in U.S. dollars.)	5.9 (Note: Naftogaz reported revenues of грн159.234 billion in 2020. The average exchange rate for Ukrainian hryvnia to U.S. dollars was 0.0372 in 2020, which equates to $5.9 billion in U.S. dollars.)	8.0 (Note: Naftogaz reported revenues of грн218.979 billion in 2021. The average exchange rate for Ukrainian hryvnia to U.S. dollars was 0.0367 in 2021, which equates to $8.0 billion in U.S. dollars.)	
Abu Dhabi National Oil Company	United Arab Emirates	5.3	6.2	5.8	4.3	5.6	8.7
Emirates National Oil Company	United Arab Emirates	16.4	21.0				
BP	United Kingdom	244.5	303.7	282.6	105.9 (Note: BP initially reported its year-end revenues as $180.3 billion, but later restated the results at $105.9 billion.)	157.7	248.8
Centrica	United Kingdom	28.0	27.3	15.9	14.9	18.3	41.6 (Note: Centrica reported revenues of £33.637 billion in 2022. The average exchange rate for British pounds to U.S. dollars was 1.2369 in 2022, which equates to $41.6 billion in U.S. dollars.)
Harbour Energy	United Kingdom	(Note: Harbour Energy was formed in January 2021 from the merger of mid-tier hydrocarbon exploration and development companies Premier Oil and Chrysaor. No data for the company is therefore available for 2017, 2018, or 2019.)	(Note: Harbour Energy was formed in January 2021 from the merger of mid-tier hydrocarbon exploration and development companies Premier Oil and Chrysaor. No data for the company is therefore available for 2017, 2018, or 2019.)	(Note: Harbour Energy was formed in January 2021 from the merger of mid-tier hydrocarbon exploration and development companies Premier Oil and Chrysaor. No data for the company is therefore available for 2017, 2018, or 2019.)	2.4	3.4	5.4
Neptune Energy	United Kingdom		2.5	2.2	1.5	2.4	4.6
Shell	United Kingdom	211.8	396.5	352.1	183.1	272.6	386.2
Tullow Oil	United Kingdom	1.7	1.8	1.6	1.3	1.2	1.7
APA Corporation	United States	5.9	7.3	6.5	4.4	8.0	11.0
Cheniere Energy	United States	5.6	7.9	9.7	9.3	15.8	33.4
Chesapeake Energy	United States	10.0	10.0	8.5	5.2	5.8	11.7
Chevron Corporation	United States	141.7	166.3	139.9	94.4	162.4	246.2
Civitas Resources	United States				0.2	0.9	3.7
ConocoPhillips	United States	32.5	38.7	36.6	19.2	45.8	82.1
Coterra Energy	United States				1.4	3.4	9.0
Devon Energy	United States	6.5	8.9	6.2	4.8	12.2	19.1
Energy Transfer Partners	United States	40.5	54.0	54.2	38.9	67.4	89.8
Enterprise Products	United States	29.2	36.4	32.7	27.1	40.7	58.1
EOG Resources	United States	11.2	17.2	17.3	11.0	18.6	25.7
EQT Corporation	United States	2.6	4.6	3.7	2.6	6.8	12.1
Equitrans Midstream	United States	0.8	1.4	1.6	1.5	1.3	1.3
ExxonMobil	United States	244.3	290.2	264.9	181.5	285.6	413.6
HF Sinclair	United States	14.2	17.7	17.4	11.1	18.3 (Note: Data in this list is for the HollyFrontier Corporation. In August 2021, HollyFrontier purchased most of the assets of Sinclair Oil Corporation. The transaction closed on March 14, 2022, and a new company, HF Sinclair, replaced the two predecessors. Going forward, data in this list will be for HF Sinclair.)	38.2
Hess Corporation	United States	5.3	6.4	6.5	4.8	7.5	11.5
Kinder Morgan	United States	13.7	14.1	13.2	11.7	16.6	19.2
Magellan Midstream Partners	United States	2.5	2.8	2.6	2.3	2.7	3.2
Marathon Petroleum	United States	74.7	96.5	123.9	69.7	119.9	179.9
Northern Oil & Gas	United States				0.5	0.4	1.5
Occidental Petroleum	United States	13.2	18.9	21.7	16.2	26.3	37.0
Oneok	United States	9.8	11.3	8.9	7.2	15.1	22.3
Ovintiv	United States			6.7	6.1	8.7	12.4
PBF Energy	United States	21.8	27.2	24.5	15.1	27.3	46.8
PDC Energy	United States	0.9	1.5	1.1	1.3	1.8	3.8
Phillips 66	United States	104.6	111.4	109.5	65.4	114.8	175.7
Plains All American Pipeline	United States	20.1	26.2	33.6	23.2	42.0	57.3
Talos Energy	United States	0.3	0.7	0.8	0.5	1.0	1.6
Targa Resources	United States	8.8	10.4	8.1	8.2	16.9	20.9
Valero Energy	United States	93.0	117.0	108.3	64.9	113.9	176.3
Williams Companies	United States	8.0	8.6	8.2	7.7	10.6	10.9
Uzbekneftegaz	Uzbekistan		2.6 (Note: Uzbekneftegaz reported revenues of 21.493 trillion soum in 2018. The average exchange rate for Uzbekistani soum to the US dollar was 0.000124 in 2018, which equates to $2.6 billion in US dollars.)	2.7 (Note: Uzbekneftegaz reported revenues of 24.225 trillion soum in 2019. The average exchange rate for Uzbekistani soum to the US dollar was 0.000114 in 2019, which equates to $2.7 billion in US dollars.)	1.9 (Note: Uzbekneftegaz reported revenues of 19.354 trillion soum in 2020. The average exchange rate for Uzbekistani soum to the US dollar was 0.0001 in 2020, which equates to $1.9 billion in US dollars.)	4.1 (Note: Uzbekneftegaz reported revenues of 20.716 trillion soum in 2021. The average exchange rate for Uzbekistani soum to the US dollar was 0.0002 in 2021, which equates to $4.1 billion in US dollars.)	6.4 (Note: Uzbekneftegaz reported revenues of 28.215 trillion soum in 2022. The average exchange rate for Uzbekistani soum to the US dollar was 0.0002 in 2022, which equates to $6.4 billion in US dollars.)
PDVSA	Venezuela	(Note: PDVSA does not publish annual financial data.)	(Note: PDVSA does not publish annual financial data.)	(Note: PDVSA does not publish annual financial data.)	(Note: PDVSA does not publish annual financial data.)	11.0 (Note: PDVSA does not publish annual financial data. The 2021 figure is an estimate.)	
Petrovietnam	Vietnam	21.3	26.9	31.7	21.1	27.1	39.7 (Note: Petrovietnam reported revenues of ₫931.2 trillion in 2022. The average exchange rate for Vietnamese đồng to U.S. dollars was 0.00004274 in 2022, which equates to $39.7 billion in U.S. dollars.)

== See also ==
- List of largest manufacturing companies by revenue
- List of largest financial services companies by revenue
- List of largest companies by revenue
- List of petroleum industry occupations
- List of public corporations by market capitalization
- List of largest corporate profits and losses
- Fortune Global 500
- Forbes Global 2000
