= China Suntien Green Energy =

Chinese national oil company

China Suntien Green Energy Corporation, Ltd.
- Native name: 新天綠色能源股份有限公司
- Romanized name: Xīn Tiān Lǜsè Néngyuán Gǔfèn Yǒuxiàn Gōngsī
- Company type: State-owned enterprise
- Industry: Natural gas, Wind power
- Founded: 9 February 2010; 16 years ago
- Headquarters: Shijiazhuang, China
- Key people: Xin Cao (Chairman); Chun Xiao Mei (CEO)
- Operating income: ▲CN¥15,985 million (2021)
- Net income: ▲CN¥2,711 million (2021)
- Total assets: ▲CN¥16,005 million (2021)
- Total equity: ▲CN¥23,764 million (2021)
- Number of employees: 2,489 (2021)
- Parent: HECIC (Hebei Construction & Investment Group), HECIC Water Investment Co.
- Subsidiaries: Caofeidian Suntien Liquefied Natural Gas Co. Hebei Natural Gas Company; HECIC New Energy Co.
- Website: www.suntien.com
- Footnotes / references source

China Suntien Green Energy
- Simplified Chinese: 新日綠色能源公司
- Traditional Chinese: 新天綠色能源股份有限公司
Transcriptions
Standard Mandarin
- Hanyu Pinyin: Xīn Tiān Lǜsè Néngyuán Gǔfèn Yǒuxiàn Gōngsī

China Suntien Green Energy Corp. Ltd. (simplified Chinese: 新日綠色能源公司; traditional Chinese: 新天綠色能源股份有限公司; pinyin: Xīn Tiān Lǜsè Néngyuán Gǔfèn Yǒuxiàn Gōngsī) is a major natural gas and wind power corporation in China. Its headquarters are in Shijiazhuang in the province of Hebei.

== Corporate structure ==
China Suntien Green Energy is a joint stock company established on 9 February 2010 by HECIC (Hebei Construction & Investment Group) and its subsidiary, HECIC Water Investment Co. HECIC is owned by the provincial government of Hebei Province. China Suntien Green Energy is the clean energy arm of HECIC. The initial public offering was one of several Chinese renewable energy IPOs in 2010 and 2011, which included China Goldwind, Datang Renewables (a subsidiary of China Datang Corporation), Shanghai Taisheng Wind Power, and Trony Solar.

China Suntien Green Energy raised US$369 million in its initial public offering on the Hong Kong Stock Exchange. A major foreign investor was JPMorgan Chase, which purchased 13.87 percent of the company's stock within 12 days of its initial trading day.

China Suntien Green Energy engages in the acquisition, sale, and distribution of natural gas; constructs natural gas pipelines; sells natural gas appliances to gas companies and industrial clients; constructs and operates solar and wind power farms; and sells the electricity it generates to electrical utilities. At the time of its incorporation, China Suntien Green Energy owned a single wind farm.

In December 2021, China Suntien Green Energy signed an agreement to purchase one million metric tons of liquified natural gas a year from Qatar Liquefied Gas. The contract runs for 15 years.
