= List of NBA players (E–F) =

This is a list of National Basketball Association players whose last names begin with E or F.

The list also includes players from the American National Basketball League (NBL), the Basketball Association of America (BAA), and the original American Basketball Association (ABA). All of these leagues contributed to the formation of the present-day NBA.

Individuals who played in the NBL prior to its 1949 merger with the BAA are listed in italics, as they are not traditionally listed in the NBA's official player registers.

== E ==
- Ledell Eackles
- Jim Eakins
- Acie Earl
- Ed Earle
- Cleanthony Early
- Tari Eason
- Mark Eaton
- Jerry Eaves
- Devin Ebanks
- Floyd Ebaugh
- Bill Ebben
- Al Eberhard
- Ndudi Ebi
- Roy Ebron
- Jaime Echenique
- Jarell Eddie
- Patrick Eddie
- Dwight Eddleman
- Kenton Edelin
- Zach Edey
- Charles Edge
- V. J. Edgecombe
- Bobby Joe Edmonds
- Keith Edmonson
- Tyus Edney
- Anthony Edwards
- Bill Edwards
- Blue Edwards
- Carsen Edwards
- Corsley Edwards
- Doug Edwards
- Franklin Edwards
- Gran Edwards
- James Edwards
- Jay Edwards
- Jesse Edwards
- John Edwards
- Justin Edwards
- Kessler Edwards
- Kevin Edwards
- Leroy Edwards
- Rob Edwards
- Shane Edwards
- Tommy Edwards
- Vincent Edwards
- Johnny Egan
- Lonnie Eggleston
- Bulbs Ehlers
- Craig Ehlo
- Rich Eichhorst
- Howard Eisley
- Zuby Ejiofor
- Obinna Ekezie
- Khalid El-Amin
- Don Eliason
- Mario Elie
- C. J. Elleby
- Ray Ellefson
- Henry Ellenson
- Wayne Ellington
- Denny Elliot
- Bob Elliott
- Sean Elliott
- Bo Ellis
- Boo Ellis
- Dale Ellis
- Harold Ellis
- Joe Ellis
- Keon Ellis
- LaPhonso Ellis
- LeRon Ellis
- LeRoy Ellis
- Monta Ellis
- Pervis Ellison
- Len Elmore
- Don Elser
- Francisco Elson
- Darrell Elston
- Melvin Ely
- Joel Embiid
- Wayne Embry
- Andre Emmett
- Tristan Enaruna
- Ned Endress
- Warner Engdahl
- Wayne Engelstad
- Chris Engler
- A. J. English
- Alex English
- Claude English
- Jo Jo English
- Kim English
- Scott English
- Gene Englund
- James Ennis III
- Tyler Ennis
- Charlie Epperson
- Ray Epps
- Ed Erban
- Semih Erden
- Bo Erias
- Keith Erickson
- Mark Ertel
- Julius Erving
- Evan Eschmeyer
- Jack Eskridge
- Vincenzo Esposito
- Noa Essengue
- Drew Eubanks
- Billy Evans
- Bob Evans
- Brian Evans
- Dick Evans
- Earl Evans
- Hank Evans
- Isaiah Evans
- Jacob Evans
- Jawun Evans
- Jeremy Evans
- Maurice Evans
- Mike Evans
- Reggie Evans
- Tyreke Evans
- Byron Evard
- Tosan Evbuomwan
- Daniel Ewing
- Patrick Ewing
- Patrick Ewing Jr.
- Ken Exel
- Dante Exum
- Christian Eyenga
- Festus Ezeli
- Johnny Ezersky

== F ==
- Joe Fabel
- John Fairchild
- Teddy Falda
- Tacko Fall
- Phil Farbman
- Kenneth Faried
- Dick Farley
- Jordan Farmar
- Desmon Farmer
- Jim Farmer
- Mike Farmer
- Tony Farmer
- Bill Farrow
- Bob Faught
- Vítor Faverani
- Derrick Favors
- Nick Fazekas
- Jeremiah Fears
- Fred Fechtman
- Dave Fedor
- Bob Feerick
- Butch Feher
- Jamie Feick
- Ron Feiereisel
- George Feigenbaum
- Dave Feitl
- Cristiano Felício
- Kay Felder
- Carrick Felix
- Noel Felix
- Ray Felix
- Raymond Felton
- Jake Fendley
- Warren Fenley
- Desmond Ferguson
- Terrance Ferguson
- Rudy Fernandez
- Bruno Fernando
- Eric Fernsten
- Al Ferrari
- Rolando Ferreira
- Duane Ferrell
- Yogi Ferrell
- Arnie Ferrin
- Bob Ferry
- Danny Ferry
- Kyrylo Fesenko
- Bobby Fields
- Kenny Fields
- Landry Fields
- Adam Filipczak
- Ron Filipek
- Kyle Filipowski
- Greg Fillmore
- Larry Finch
- Hank Finkel
- Michael Finley
- Danny Finn
- Dorian Finney-Smith
- Matt Fish
- Derek Fisher
- Rick Fisher
- Gerald Fitch
- Malik Fitts
- Wilson Fitts
- Bob Fitzgerald
- Dick Fitzgerald
- Marcus Fizer
- Cooper Flagg
- Adam Flagler
- Jerry Fleishman
- Al Fleming
- Ed Fleming
- Rasheer Fleming
- Vern Fleming
- Kingston Flemings
- Gordon Flick
- Luis Flores
- Bruce Flowers
- Trentyn Flowers
- Sleepy Floyd
- Jonny Flynn
- Malachi Flynn
- Mike Flynn
- Larry Fogle
- Jack Foley
- Isaac Fontaine
- Levi Fontaine
- Simone Fontecchio
- Jeff Foote
- Bryn Forbes
- Gary Forbes
- Aleem Ford
- Alphonso Ford
- Alton Ford
- Bob Ford
- Chris Ford
- Don Ford
- Jake Ford
- Jordan Ford
- Len Ford
- Phil Ford
- Sharrod Ford
- Sherell Ford
- T. J. Ford
- Donnie Forman
- Bayard Forrest
- Trent Forrest
- Joseph Forte
- Ernie Fortney
- Courtney Fortson
- Danny Fortson
- Fred Foster
- Greg Foster
- Jeff Foster
- Jimmy Foster
- Michael Foster Jr.
- Rod Foster
- Antonis Fotsis
- Evan Fournier
- Larry Foust
- Steve Fowdy
- Calvin Fowler
- Jerry Fowler
- Tremaine Fowlkes
- De'Aaron Fox
- Harold Fox
- Jim Fox
- Rick Fox
- Wilbur Fox
- Randy Foye
- Adonal Foyle
- Richie Frahm
- Chet Francis
- Steve Francis
- Tellis Frank
- Nat Frankel
- Jamaal Franklin
- Will Franklin
- Robert Franks
- Ron Franz
- Nick Frascella
- Melvin Frazier
- Michael Frazier II
- Tim Frazier
- Walt Frazier
- Wilbert Frazier
- Anthony Frederick
- Jimmer Fredette
- World B. Free
- Joel Freeland
- Donnie Freeman
- Enrique Freeman
- Gary Freeman
- Rod Freeman
- Javon Freeman-Liberty
- Matt Freije
- Frido Frey
- Larry Friend
- Pat Frink
- Ted Fritsch
- Jim Fritsche
- Channing Frye
- Bernie Fryer
- Frank Fucarino
- Alex Fudge
- Herm Fuetsch
- Joe Fulks
- Carl Fuller
- Hiram Fuller
- Homer Fuller
- Todd Fuller
- Tony Fuller
- Markelle Fultz
- Lawrence Funderburke
- Andrew Funk
- Dick Furey
- Terry Furlow
- Johnny Furphy
