= 1946–47 Toronto Huskies season =

- Head coach: Ed Sadowski (3–9); Lew Hayman (0–1); Dick Fitzgerald (2–1); Red Rolfe (17–27)
- Arena: Maple Leaf Gardens

Results
- Record: 22–38 (.367)
- Place: Division: 6th (Eastern)
- Playoff finish: Did not qualify
- Radio: CFRB

The 1946–47 BAA season was the Toronto Huskies' sole season of existence. The Huskies played in the Basketball Association of America, the forerunner to the National Basketball Association (NBA), and hosted what is now considered the NBA's first game at Maple Leaf Gardens in Toronto on November 1, 1946, losing to the New York Knickerbockers 68–66. They would also be the only Canadian team to enter this newly-created professional basketball league that was created in part by most of the Original Six owners of the National Hockey League (NHL) due to Montreal declining to have a team enter into this new league when Toronto decided to join in alongside the rest of the NHL's team owners and owners from the American Hockey League (AHL) at the time. The Huskies finished last in their division and folded after one season.

Throughout the season, the Huskies had four head coaches: player-coach Ed Sadowski with 3 wins and 9 losses, interim Lew Hayman at 0–1, interim Dick Fitzgerald at 2–1, and player-coach Red Rolfe at 17–27. After the BAA's inaugural season concluded, the Huskies were initially undecided on their long-term plans due to a combination of the team's poor record and the status of the Maple Leaf Gardens being more focused at that time on its namesake tenants, the Toronto Maple Leafs of the National Hockey League.

While they participated in the 1947 BAA draft, the Huskies ultimately joined the Pittsburgh Ironmen, Detroit Falcons, and Cleveland Rebels as the four inaugural BAA teams (as well as the only Eastern Division team) to exit the league before the following season. Toronto later gained an NBA team for the 1995–96 NBA season with the debut of the Toronto Raptors.

== Roster ==
Due to this being the first and only season in the franchise's history, the BAA didn't utilize a draft system like they would in future seasons of the BAA/NBA and instead relied upon the head coach and general manager of the team finding and signing players. For the Huskies, business director Lew Hayman was happy to take on the bidding of player-coach Ed Sadowski from Seton Hall College (who would already take on one of the open player spots for the team by default for the start of the season). As a result of that, Sadowski would pick up fellow Seton Hall alumni Mike McCarron and Bob Fitzgerald as well as his brother Dick Fitzgerald from Fordham University, Charlie Hoefer from Queens College, George Nostrand from the University of Wyoming, Harry Miller from the University of North Carolina at Chapel Hill, Frank Fucarino from Long Island University, Ray Wertis from St. John's University, Roy Hurley from Arsenal Technical High School and Murray State University, and a couple of Canadian players to satisfy the local fans for the opening roster to start the season. Six Canadians players were brought in to tryout for the roster (with the names of most of those players in question being lost to time), with only two players actually making the team to start the season; those players were Gino Sovran and Hank Biasatti, who had both attended Assumpion College of the University of Western Ontario (with Biasatti being an Italian-Canadian and Sovran also attending the University of Detroit as well), though Sadowski boldly stated that neither Sovran nor Biasatti would actually play for the Huskies at the time with regards to his American players at hand.

1946–47 Toronto Huskies roster
Players

Pos.	No.	Player	Height	Weight	DOB	From
F	10	Dick Fitzgerald	6 ft 2 in (1.88 m)	175 lb (79 kg)	1920-11-18	Fordham
F	12	Frank Fucarino	6 ft 2 in (1.88 m)	175 lb (79 kg)	1920-07-24	LIU Brooklyn
F/C	16	Kleggie Hermsen	6 ft 9 in (2.06 m)	225 lb (102 kg)	1923-03-12	Minnesota
G/F	21	Roy Hurley	6 ft 2 in (1.88 m)	170 lb (77 kg)	1922-08-12	Murray State
G	19	Ed Kasid	5 ft 11 in (1.80 m)	185 lb (84 kg)	1923-08-13	Minneapolis Vocational HS (MN)
G	14	Mike McCarron	5 ft 11 in (1.80 m)	180 lb (82 kg)	1922-03-02	Seton Hall
F	16	Nat Militzok	6 ft 3 in (1.91 m)	195 lb (88 kg)	1923-05-03	Cornell
F/C	15	Harry Miller	6 ft 4 in (1.93 m)	230 lb (104 kg)	1923-07-28	North Carolina
F/C	22	Leo Mogus	6 ft 4 in (1.93 m)	190 lb (86 kg)	1921-04-13	Youngstown State
G	11	Bob Mullens	6 ft 1 in (1.85 m)	175 lb (79 kg)	1922-11-01	Fordham
G/F	18	Dick Schulz	6 ft 2 in (1.88 m)	192 lb (87 kg)	1917-01-03	Wisconsin
C	20	Ralph Siewert	7 ft 1 in (2.16 m)	230 lb (104 kg)	1923-12-31	Dakota Wesleyan
G	23	Red Wallace	6 ft 1 in (1.85 m)	185 lb (84 kg)	1918-07-12	Scranton

Coaches
Head coach
- Red Rolfe

Legend
- (DP) Unsigned draft pick
- (FA) Free agent
- (S) Suspended
- Injured

Roster

=== Season standings ===
#	Eastern Division				
#	Team	W	L	PCT	GB
1	x-Washington Capitols	49	11	.817	–
2	x-Philadelphia Warriors	35	25	.583	14
3	x-New York Knicks	33	27	.550	16
4	Providence Steamrollers	28	32	.467	21
5	Boston Celtics	22	38	.367	27
6	Toronto Huskies	22	38	.367	27

== Regular season ==
The attendance for the inaugural match was 7,090 with ticket prices ranging from 75 cents to two dollars and fifty cents. On that night, anyone taller than George Nostrand, the tallest Husky at 6'8", was given free admission.

Attendance quickly dwindled and the Toronto Star published an estimate that team owners Eric Cradock (co-owner of the Montreal Alouettes football team) and Harold Shannon lost $100,000 in one season of operations. The managing director of the Huskies was Lew Hayman, who was also the coach and general manager of the Alouettes. Previously, he had been a star basketball player at Syracuse University. Other key figures included team president Charles Watson, co-founders Ben Newman and Salter Hayden, and Annis Stukus.

=== Game log ===
#	Date	Visitor	Score	Home	High points	Record
1	November 1, 1946	New York Knickerbockers	68–66	Toronto Huskies	Ed Sadowski (18)	0–1
2	November 3, 1946	Toronto Huskies	60–71	Cleveland Rebels	George Nostrand (17)	0–2
3	November 8, 1946	Detroit Falcons	71–73	Toronto Huskies	Fitzgerald, Sadowski (16)	1–2
4	November 9, 1946	Toronto Huskies	54–64	Chicago Stags	Ed Sadowski (15)	1–3
5	November 15, 1946	Providence Steamrollers	68–85	Toronto Huskies	Ed Sadowski (30)	2–3
6	November 16, 1946	Toronto Huskies	49–53	Boston Celtics	Ed Sadowski (14)	2–4
7	November 18, 1946	Toronto Huskies	48–54	Pittsburgh Ironmen	Ed Sadowski (21)	2–5
8	November 19, 1946	Cleveland Rebels	74–72	Toronto Huskies	Ed Sadowski (25)	2–6
9	November 22, 1946	Boston Celtics	82–83	Toronto Huskies	Dick Fitzgerald (15)	3–6
10	November 23, 1946	Toronto Huskies	50–74	Washington Capitols	Mike McCarron (14)	3–7
11	November 26, 1946	Washington Capitols	78–68	Toronto Huskies	Ed Sadowski (23)	3–8
12	November 29, 1946	Cleveland Rebels	87–72	Toronto Huskies	Ed Sadowski (20)	3–9
13	November 30, 1946	Toronto Huskies	65–79	Providence Steamrollers	Mike McCarron (20)	3–10
14	December 5, 1946	Toronto Huskies	65–61	Chicago Stags	Charlie Hoefer (14)	4–10
15	December 7, 1946	Toronto Huskies	68–59	Providence Steamrollers	Ray Wertis (13)	5–10
16	December 10, 1946	Philadelphia Warriors	85–73	Toronto Huskies	Mike McCarron (24)	5–11
17	December 13, 1946	Pittsburgh Ironmen	62–52	Toronto Huskies	Mike McCarron (13)	5–12
18	December 15, 1946	Toronto Huskies	50–46	St. Louis Bombers	Mike McCarron (14)	6–12
19	December 17, 1946	Toronto Huskies	62–78	Cleveland Rebels	Kleggie Hermsen (13)	6–13
20	December 20, 1946	New York Knickerbockers	70–74	Toronto Huskies	Kleggie Hermsen (24)	7–13
21	December 27, 1946	Chicago Stags	88–80	Toronto Huskies	Leo Mogus (21)	7–14
22	December 29, 1946	Toronto Huskies	52–48	Detroit Falcons	Mike McCarron (13)	8–14
23	December 31, 1946	Chicago Stags	76–87	Toronto Huskies	Kleggie Hermsen (20)	9–14
24	January 3, 1947	Boston Celtics	58–53	Toronto Huskies	Leo Mogus (15)	9–15
25	January 6, 1947	Detroit Falcons	61–76	Toronto Huskies	Kleggie Hermsen (23)	10–15
26	January 8, 1947	Toronto Huskies	76–63	New York Knickerbockers	Dick Schulz (20)	11–15
27	January 9, 1947	Toronto Huskies	55–74	Philadelphia Warriors	Kleggie Hermsen (11)	11–16
28	January 11, 1947	Toronto Huskies	66–81	Washington Capitols	Hurley, Nostrand (16)	11–17
29	January 14, 1947	Philadelphia Warriors	104–74	Toronto Huskies	Leo Mogus (13)	11–18
30	January 17, 1947	Detroit Falcons	74–64	Toronto Huskies	Kleggie Hermsen (14)	11–19
31	January 21, 1947	St. Louis Bombers	71–72	Toronto Huskies	Leo Mogus (26)	12–19
32	January 24, 1947	Providence Steamrollers	96–93	Toronto Huskies	Red Wallace (23)	12–20
33	January 27, 1947	Cleveland Rebels	88–82	Toronto Huskies	Red Wallace (16)	12–21
34	January 28, 1947	Toronto Huskies	70–80	Cleveland Rebels	Red Wallace (20)	12–22
35	January 31, 1947	Washington Capitols	74–83	Toronto Huskies	Red Wallace (38)	13–22
36	February 2, 1947	Toronto Huskies	75–90	Chicago Stags	Mike McCarron (27)	13–23
37	February 5, 1947	Toronto Huskies	58–55	Pittsburgh Ironmen	Red Wallace (16)	14–23
38	February 6, 1947	Toronto Huskies	61–79	Philadelphia Warriors	Leo Mogus (16)	14–24
39	February 8, 1947	Toronto Huskies	46–69	New York Knickerbockers	Leo Mogus (13)	14–25
40	February 14, 1947	Pittsburgh Ironmen	73–84	Toronto Huskies	Leo Mogus (27)	15–25
41	February 16, 1947	Toronto Huskies	64–80	St. Louis Bombers	Leo Mogus (16)	15–26
42	February 18, 1947	St. Louis Bombers	57–65	Toronto Huskies	Red Wallace (16)	16–26
43	February 19, 1947	Toronto Huskies	59–69	Washington Capitols	Mike McCarron (13)	16–27
44	February 21, 1947	Boston Celtics	61–67	Toronto Huskies	Leo Mogus (21)	17–27
45	February 23, 1947	Toronto Huskies	52–61	Detroit Falcons	Red Wallace (15)	17–28
46	February 25, 1947	Providence Steamrollers	60–83	Toronto Huskies	Nat Militzok (16)	18–28
47	February 28, 1947	Philadelphia Warriors	69–77	Toronto Huskies	Mike McCarron (20)	19–28
48	March 1, 1947	Toronto Huskies	48–63	New York Knickerbockers	Leo Mogus (12)	19–29
49	March 3, 1947	Toronto Huskies	66–76	Philadelphia Warriors	Red Wallace (21)	19–30
50	March 5, 1947	Toronto Huskies	63–60	Pittsburgh Ironmen	Leo Mogus (22)	20–30
51	March 7, 1947	Washington Capitols	86–70	Toronto Huskies	Leo Mogus (18)	20–31
52	March 8, 1947	Toronto Huskies	65–67	Boston Celtics	Leo Mogus (22)	20–32
53	March 11, 1947	St. Louis Bombers	71–79	Toronto Huskies	Leo Mogus (21)	21–32
54	March 12, 1947	Toronto Huskies	57–69	Boston Celtics	Leo Mogus (21)	21–33
55	March 13, 1947	Toronto Huskies	64–71	Providence Steamrollers	Nat Militzok (16)	21–34
56	March 18, 1947	Pittsburgh Ironmen	70–64	Toronto Huskies	Nat Militzok (14)	21–35
57	March 21, 1947	Chicago Stags	99–83	Toronto Huskies	Mike McCarron (29)	21–36
58	March 23, 1947	Toronto Huskies	40–60	St. Louis Bombers	Mike McCarron (14)	21–37
59	March 28, 1947	New York Knickerbockers	61–71	Toronto Huskies	Mike McCarron (22)	22–37
60	March 29, 1947	Toronto Huskies	63–66	Detroit Falcons	Mike McCarron (18)	22–38

== Player stats ==
Note: GP= Games played; FG= Field Goals; FT= Free Throws; FTA = Free Throws Attempted; AST = Assists; PTS = Points

Player	GP	FG	FT	FTA	AST	PTS
Mike McCarron	60	236	177	288	59	649
Leo Mogus	41	186	172	237	56	544
Red Wallace	37	170	85	148	38	425
Dick Fitzgerald	60	118	41	60	40	277
Kleggie Hermsen	21	95	64	97	15	254
Dick Schulz	41	87	74	107	39	248
Roy Hurley	46	100	39	64	34	239
Bob Mullens	28	98	42	68	36	238
Ed Sadowski	10	73	45	66	8	191
Harry Miller	53	58	36	82	42	152
Charlie Hoefer	23	54	32	46	9	140
Frank Fucarino	28	53	34	60	7	140
Bob Fitzgerald	31	47	45	70	26	139
George Nostrand	13	46	24	61	10	116
Nat Militzok	21	38	24	39	14	100
Ray Wertis	18	38	23	37	18	99
Ralph Siewert	14	5	6	10	4	16
Ed Kasid	8	6	0	6	6	12
Gino Sovran	6	5	1	2	1	11
Hank Biasatti	6	2	2	4	0	6

== Playoffs ==
The Huskies did not qualify for the postseason in their only season of play.

== Transactions ==
=== Trades ===
December 4, 1946	To Toronto Huskies Kleggie Hermsen	To Cleveland Rebels George Nostrand
December 16, 1946	To Toronto Huskies Leo Mogus; Dick Schulz; Cash	To Cleveland Rebels Ed Sadowski; Ray Wertis
January 2, 1947	To Toronto Huskies Red Wallace	To Boston Celtics Charlie Hoefer
January 21, 1947	To Toronto Huskies Bob Mullens	To New York Knicks Bob Fitzgerald

=== Purchases ===
Player	Date bought	Previous team
Nat Militzok	February 5, 1947	New York Knicks

== Season losses ==
Throughout the season, the Toronto Huskies had an average total of only 2,103 paid attendees per game, with net receipts totaling $43,590 American dollars and estimated losses totaling around $215,000 American dollars for this season (which was the highest amount of (American) dollars lost by a BAA team this season). Due to the uncertain future of the BAA with a large number of teams with lost revenue, the lower average Canadian salary allowing the average citizen to afford a family to attend professional basketball matches (the average annual salary in Toronto from November 1946 was $33.47 in Canadian dollars, with ticket prices ranging from seventy-five cents to $2.50, with a family cost for parking and a soft drink totaling around $5 Canadian, which would be a high percentage for that period of time), and the status of the Maple Leaf Gardens being more focused at that time on its namesake tenants, the Toronto Maple Leafs of the National Hockey League (NHL), the Huskies were one of two teams, along with the Chicago Stags, which were undecided on whether they would play another season or not. While the Stags ultimately continued to play in the BAA/NBA until 1950 when they ceased operations, the Huskies decided to fold alongside the Pittsburgh Ironmen following their entries in the inaugural 1947 BAA draft, with Toronto finding it not economically worthwhile to continue operating the franchise.

Greater details on their first and only season would be explored in Charley Rosen's book called "The First Tip-Off: The Incredible Story of the Birth of the NBA", with an entire chapter dedicated to the Huskies' woes and troubles in their only season of play within the BAA that ultimately lead them to their quick downfall following their only season, including how Ed Sadowski (alongside the Canadian economy of the time) helped lead the team to their demise early on due to the coaching part of the player-coach side being something he was woefully inexperienced with.

== Dispersal draft ==
During the first end of season meeting for the Basketball Association of America's board of governors on May 21, 1947, the Huskies joined the Chicago Stags as one of two teams who were unsure on whether or not they would continue to play for another season. Despite this uncertainty, both the Huskies and Stags participated in the inaugural 1947 BAA draft. The Huskies selected Glen Selbo from the University of Wisconsin, Red Rocha from Oregon State University, Frank Broyles from the Georgia School of Technology (now Georgia Tech), Wimpy Quinn from the University of Oregon, and Paul Hoffman from Purdue University. During the same draft, former Huskies player Hank Biasatti (from Assumption College in Windsor, Ontario) was drafted by the Boston Celtics in the second round, although he never played professional basketball again, instead opting to play baseball professionally.

While the Stags ultimately decided to continue for another season, later playing up until 1950, the Huskies and Pittsburgh Ironmen folded operations entirely on July 27, 1947. The remaining eight teams (the surviving seven teams plus the original Baltimore Bullets franchise that came from the original American Basketball League) entered into a dispersal draft on August 2 that year, with each team taking players from the previously disbanded Cleveland Rebels and Detroit Falcons franchises alongside the Huskies and Ironmen. The following teams acquired these players from the Ironmen during the dispersal draft period:

- Baltimore Bullets: Leo Mogus & Dick Schulz
- Boston Celtics: Harry Miller
- New York Knicks: Mike McCarron
- Providence Steamrollers: Dick Fitzgerald
- Washington Capitols: Roy Hurley, Bob Mullens, & Red Wallace
