= Fordham Rams men's basketball =

Men's college basketball team

2026–27 Fordham Rams men's basketball team
- University: Fordham University
- Head coach: Mike Magpayo (2nd season)
- Location: Bronx, New York
- Arena: Rose Hill Gymnasium (capacity: 3,200)
- Conference: Atlantic 10
- Nickname: Rams
- Colors: Maroon and white

NCAA Division I tournament Sweet Sixteen
- 1971

NCAA Division I tournament appearances
- 1953, 1954, 1971, 1992

Conference tournament champions
- Patriot League: 1991, 1992; MAAC: 1983

Conference regular-season champions
- Patriot League: 1991, 1992, 1994; Metro NY: 1963

Uniforms
Home	Away

The Fordham Rams men's basketball team represents Fordham University, located in the Bronx, New York, in NCAA Division I basketball competition. They compete in the Atlantic 10 Conference. The Rams play their home games at the Rose Hill Gymnasium (3,200), the nation's oldest on-campus collegiate basketball arena still in use. On February 28, 1940, Fordham University played in the nation's first televised college basketball game, when the Rams fell to Pitt at Madison Square Garden. Fordham hired former UC Riverside head coach Mike Magpayo on March 29, 2025.

== Postseason ==
=== NCAA tournament results ===
The Rams have appeared in four NCAA Tournaments. Their record is 2–4. Fordham also participated in a play-in game prior to the 1991 NCAA Tournament before the tournament field was announced, featuring the champions of the six conferences with the lowest computer ratings the previous season; the Rams played St. Francis, losing 70–64.

Year	Round	Opponent	Result
1953	First Round	Lebanon Valley	L 67–80
1954	First Round	La Salle	L 74–76
1971	First Round; Sweet 16; Regional 3rd Place Game	Furman; Villanova; South Carolina	W 105–74; L 75–85; W 100–90
1992	First Round	Massachusetts	L 58–85

=== NIT results ===
The Rams have appeared in 16 National Invitation Tournaments (NIT). Their combined record is 5–17.

Year	Round	Opponent	Result
1943	Quarterfinals; Semifinals; 3rd Place Game	Western Kentucky; St. John's; Washington & Jefferson	W 60–58; L 43–69; L 34–39
1958	First Round; Quarterfinals	St. Francis (NY); Dayton	W 83–59; L 70–74
1959	First Round	Butler	L 80–94
1963	First Round	Memphis	L 49–70
1965	First Round	Western Kentucky	L 53–57
1968	First Round	Duquesne; Dayton	W 69–60; L 60–61
1969	First Round	Louisville	L 70–73
1972	First Round	Jacksonville	L 75–94
1981	First Round	Dayton	L 65–66
1982	First Round	Virginia Tech	L 57–59
1983	First Round	South Florida	L 69–81
1984	First Round	Weber State	L 63–75
1985	First Round	Richmond	L 57–59
1988	First Round	Houston	L 61–69
1990	First Round; Second Round	Southern; Rutgers	W 106–80; L 74–81
1991	First Round; Second Round	South Florida; Massachusetts	W 76–66; L 74–78

=== CIT results ===
The Rams have appeared in one CollegeInsider.com Postseason Tournament (CIT). Their record is 0–1.

Year	Round	Opponent	Result
2016	First Round	Boston University	L 66–69

== Coaching history ==
No.	Tenure	Coach	Years	Record	Pct.
1	1902–1903	S.J. Mellyn	1	15–6	.714
2	1903–1904	John McLaughlin	1	19–5	.792
3	1904–1905	Harry Fisher	1	18–6	.750
4	1905–1906	Loren Black	1	14–2	.875
5	1906–1907	Frank O'Donnell	1	16–9	.640
6	1907–1909	Chris Mahoney	2	31–24	.564
7	1909–1910; 1918–1919	Edward Siskind	2	40–7	.851
8	1910–1911	unknown	1	–	–
9	1911–1914	Clement Risacher	3	55–34	.618
10	1914–1915	Alcott Neary	1	17–15	.531
11	1915–1918	unknown	3	–	–
12	1919–1920	Arthur Devlin	1	12–9	.571
13	1920–1921	Orson Kinney	1	15–9	.625
14	1921–1922	Eli Butler	1	13–7	.650
15	1923–1934; 1938–1943	Edward Kelleher	16	218–93	.701
16	1934–1938	Vincent Cavanaugh	4	40–27	.597
17	1944–1949	Frank Adams	5	54–59	.478
18	1949–1968	Johnny Bach*	19	277–205	.575
19	1968–1970	Ed Conlin*^	2	27–24	.529
20	1970–1971	Digger Phelps	1	26–3	.897
21	1971–1976	Hal Wissel	5	57–74	.435
22	1976–1978	Dick Stewart	2	13–39	.250
23	1978–1986	Tom Penders	8	125–114	.523
24	1986–1987	Bob Quinn	1	14–16	.467
25	1987–2003	Nick Macarchuk	12	161–192	.456
26	1999–2003	Bob Hill	4	36–78	.316
27	2003–2009	Dereck Whittenburg	7	69–112	.381
28	2009–2010	Jared Grasso^	1	1–22	.043
29	2010–2015	Tom Pecora	5	44–106	.293
30	2015–2021	Jeff Neubauer	6	61–104	.370
31	2021–2021	Mike DePaoli^	1	1–5	.167
32	2021–2022	Kyle Neptune	1	16–16	.500
33	2022–2025	Keith Urgo^	3	50–49	.505
34	2025–present	Mike Magpayo	1	17–15	.531
Totals		34 coaches	122 seasons	1,612–1,500	.518
Records updated through end of 2025–26 season Source; *Alum^Promoted from assistant to head coach

== Notable Rams basketball players ==
=== Retired numbers ===
Fordham Rams retired numbers
No.	Player	Tenure	No. ret.	Ref.
7	Bob Mullens	1941–44	2019	
11	Ed Conlin	1951–55	2004	
34	Charlie Yelverton	1968–71	2023	
44	Ken Charles	1970–73	2019	

=== All-American Rams ===
Player	Year	Team
Bob Hassmiller	1939	2nd Team

=== Rams in the NBA ===
- Johnny Bach
- Ken Charles
- Fred Christ
- Ed Conlin
- Bob Fitzgerald
- Dick Fitzgerald
- Dan O'Sullivan
- Smush Parker
- Eric Paschall
- Charlie Yelverton

=== Rams in other pro leagues ===
- Jermaine Anderson
- Joseph Chartouny
- Bryant Dunston
- Branden Frazier
- Javontae Hawkins
- Damon Lopez
- Tom Sullivan
- Drew Williamson

=== Rams to coach in NCAA or NBA ===
- P. J. Carlesimo
- Jean Prioleau
