= Hank Biasatti =

Italian-Canadian baseball & basketball player (1922-1996)

- First baseman
- Born: January 14, 1922; Beano, Italy
- Died: April 20, 1996 (aged 74); Dearborn, Michigan, U.S.
- Batted: Left Threw: Left

MLB debut
- April 23, 1949, for the Philadelphia Athletics

Last MLB appearance
- October 2, 1949, for the Philadelphia Athletics

MLB statistics
- Batting average: .083
- Home runs: 0
- Runs batted in: 2
- Stats at Baseball Reference

Teams
- Philadelphia Athletics (1949)
Basketball career
Personal information
Listed height	5 ft 11 in (1.80 m)
Listed weight	175 lb (79 kg)
Career information
College	Assumption
BAA draft	1947: 2nd round, 13th overall pick
Drafted by	Boston Celtics
Position	Guard
Number	3
Coaching career	1956–1962
Career history
Playing
1946	Toronto Huskies
Coaching
1956–1962	Assumption
Stats at NBA.com
Stats at Basketball Reference

Henry Arcado Biasatti (January 14, 1922 – April 20, 1996) was an Italian-Canadian National Basketball Association (NBA) player and a Major League Baseball first baseman. He is the only Canadian to play at the top professional level in both sports. He was also the first international player to appear in a game in NBA history, doing so with the Toronto Huskies on November 1, 1946, against the New York Knicks; he shares this distinction with German teammate Charlie Hoefer, who played for the Huskies in the same game.

== Early career ==
Born in Beano, Italy, Biasatti grew up in Windsor, Ontario, where he was a star basketball player at Gordon McGregor Continuation School and Assumption College High School and played baseball for the East Windsor Cubs. He then played basketball at Windsor's Assumption College, federated with the University of Windsor, and served in the Canadian Army in World War II. Biasatti was a farmhand of the Toronto Maple Leafs baseball team, playing for the 1943 London Army Team and the 1944 and 1945 London Majors during the war.

The 1943 London Army Team won the Intercounty Baseball League (IBL) Championship, the Ontario Baseball Association Senior 'A' Championship and the Canadian Baseball Congress Championship. The next season, playing for the IBL Champion 1944 London Majors, Biasatti was ruled ineligible to play by the OBA because he would also play Sunday games in Detroit. The OBA ordered London to replay its semi-final series against Windsor because Biasatti had played for the Majors, a series London won again. In 1944, the London Majors also went on to win the Canadian Baseball Congress Championship.

Biasatti and the Majors also won the IBL and OBA senior title in 1945. Biasatti played basketball for Assumption between the 1945 and 1946 baseball seasons.

== Professional career ==
=== Early baseball career ===
In 1946, Biasatti began the baseball season as the starting first baseman for the Maple Leafs in the International League. He was a good fielder but a poor hitter, and lost the starting job. He was assigned to the Savannah Indians of the South Atlantic League at the end of May but returned to the Leafs a few weeks later. He asked to be farmed out in July and was sent to the Sunbury Yankees of the Class B Interstate League.

=== Basketball career ===
Following the 1946 baseball season, Biasatti was invited to the inaugural training camp of the Toronto Huskies in preparation for the first season of the Basketball Association of America, which evolved into the National Basketball Association. He was one of six Canadians invited to camp, and the only one who made the team. Former Assumption teammate Gino Sovran would join the Huskies a few weeks into the season, and the two were the only Canadians to ever play for the team. Biasatti played six games for the Huskies, including the BAA's first game, in which the Huskies played the New York Knicks, on November 1, 1946. The NBA cites Biasatti as the first international player in league history; his German teammate Charlie Hoefer also appeared in the November 1 game. He was given an outright release by the Huskies in December after telling the team that baseball was his top priority and that he would be attending training camp for the Philadelphia Athletics. He was selected by the Boston Celtics in the 1947 BAA draft, but never played for the team.

=== Return to baseball ===
In baseball, Biasatti played in Savannah in 1947, hitting .299 and finishing second in the league in home runs. He rejoined the Leafs in 1948, on loan from the Athletics, and led the team with 21 home runs. Biasatti made it to the major leagues in 1949, appearing in 21 games for the Athletics. He got some playing time in August, after an injury to starting first baseman Ferris Fain, but over 24 at-bats that season, Biasatti's batting average was a very low .083. With eight walks, his on-base percentage was .312. He had just two hits in the major leagues, both of them doubles. After the season, he was purchased by the Buffalo Bisons of the International League and played there in 1950 and 1951.

== Coaching and management career ==
In 1953, Biasatti was player-manager of the Waterloo Tigers of the Intercounty Baseball League, playing first base and pitching. He managed the Drummondville A's of Quebec's Provincial League in 1954 and the following season managed the Lancaster Red Roses in the Class B Piedmont League. Both of those teams were in the Philadelphia Athletics/Kansas City Athletics farm system.

Biasatti became head basketball coach at the newly renamed Assumption University in 1956, and in his first season, guided the team to the Ontario-Quebec Senior Intercollegiate Basketball League championship (shared with Queen's). Biasatti held the head coaching job for six seasons and again guided the team to the OQAA championship in the 1958–1959 season.

In 1996, Biasatti died at the age of 74 in Dearborn, Michigan. He was inducted into the Windsor/Essex County Sports Hall of Fame in 1982, the University of Windsor Alumni Sports Hall of Fame in 1986, and the Canadian Basketball Hall of Fame in 2001.

== BAA career statistics ==
Legend
GP	Games played
FG%	Field-goal percentage
FT%	Free-throw percentage
APG	Assists per game
PPG	Points per game

=== Regular season ===
Year	Team	GP	FG%	FT%	APG	PPG
1946–47	Toronto	6	.400	.500	0.0	1.0
Career		6	.400	.500	0.0	1.0
