= Red Wallace =

American basketball player (1918–1977)

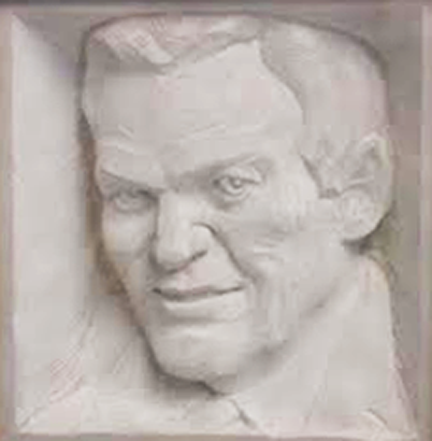
- Bas-relief sculpture of Red Wallace at the Elk Lake (Pa.) High School gym which bears his name

Personal information
- Born: July 12, 1918 Simpson, Pennsylvania, U.S.
- Died: July 7, 1977 (aged 58)
- Listed height: 6 ft 1 in (1.85 m)
- Listed weight: 185 lb (84 kg)

Career information
- High school: Fell Township (Fell Township, Pennsylvania)
- College: Keystone JC (1937–1939); Scranton (1939–1941)
- Playing career: 1944–1957
- Position: Guard
- Number: 13, 23, 17
- Coaching career: 1957–1965

Career history

Playing
- 1944–1945: New York Gothams
- 1946–1947: Boston Celtics
- 1947: Toronto Huskies
- 1947–1948: Sunbury Mercuries
- 1947–1949: Scranton Miners
- 1949–1951: Paterson Crescents
- 1951–1952: Allentown Aces
- 1954–1957: Wilkes-Barre Barons

Coaching
- 1957–1977: Elk Lake HS
- 1958–1960: Wilkes-Barre Barons
- 1964–1965: Scranton Miners

Career highlights
- As player: 2× EPBL champion (1955, 1956); As head coach: EPBL champion (1959); 2× PIAA state champion (1969, 1977)
- Stats at NBA.com
- Stats at Basketball Reference

Michael John "Red" Wallace (July 12, 1918 – July 7, 1977) was an American professional basketball player and coach. He played for the Boston Celtics during the 1946–47 Basketball Association of America season, the first in the league's existence, before he was traded to the Toronto Huskies for Charlie Hoefer. He also played for various teams in the American Basketball League prior to his stint in the BAA. Wallace played in the Eastern Professional Basketball League (EPBL) for the Sunbury Mercuries during the 1947–48 season and Wilkes-Barre Barons from 1954 to 1957. He won EPBL championship with the Barons in 1955 and 1956.

In college, Wallace played for two seasons at Keystone College, which at the time was a junior college, before finishing his career at the University of Scranton. In his post-playing career, Wallace coached teams in the EPBL, winning the league championship in 1958–59 with the Wilkes-Barre Barons. He was head coach of the Scranton Miners of the EPBL during the 1964–65 season. Wallace also coached the Elk Lake (Pa.) High School boys' basketball team and won two state championships.

== BAA career statistics ==
Legend
GP	Games played	FG%	Field-goal percentage
FT%	Free-throw percentage	APG	Assists per game
PPG	Points per game	**Bold**	Career high

=== Regular season ===
Year	Team	GP	FG%	FT%	APG	PPG
1946–47	Boston	24	.246	.438	.8	5.5
1946–47	Toronto	**37**	**.291**	**.574**	**1.0**	**11.5**
Career		61	.278	.541	1.0	9.1
