= Toronto Huskies =

- Division: Eastern
- Founded: 1946
- Folded: 1947
- History: Toronto Huskies; 1946–1947
- Arena: Maple Leaf Gardens
- Location: Toronto, Ontario
- Team colours: Blue, white
- Team manager: Lew Hayman
- Ownership: Ben Newman, Eric Cradock and Harold Shannon

The Toronto Huskies were a team in the Basketball Association of America (BAA), which was a forerunner of the National Basketball Association (NBA), during the 1946–47 season. They were based in Toronto, Canada. The team compiled a 22–38 win–loss record in its only season before disbanding in the summer of 1947.

== Franchise history ==
In 1946, a group of owners and operators of some of the larger arenas in America held a meeting in New York, to establish the Basketball Association of America (now the NBA). The majority of the would-be basketball owners were involved with the National Hockey League and wanted to fill empty dates. The only Canadian delegation invited was from Maple Leaf Gardens: Frank Selke Sr., who was in charge of the Gardens while Conn Smythe was overseas, got in touch with Ben Newman (who had coached two Canadian national championship teams and had staged a game in the Gardens previously.) The franchise cost approximately $150,000 which was funded mostly from Bay Street backers in Toronto. The major partners in the ownership group were Eric Cradock (co-owner of the Montreal Alouettes football team), Harold Shannon and Newman.

"I honestly thought we could have made a go of the team," Newman once said, "but we were given the worst possible home dates." The hardships started almost immediately when Newman's father took ill soon after the first game, forcing Newman to leave the Huskies to take over the family scrap and steel metal business in St. Catharines, Ontario. Lack of co-operation from the local media and lack of talent on the court kept crowds low, despite the use of such gimmicks that included free stockings to all women in attendance.

On November 1, 1946, they hosted the first game in BAA history, losing 68–66 to the New York Knickerbockers before an opening night crowd of 7,090. Ossie Schectman scored the opening basket for the New York Knickerbockers against the Toronto Huskies.

On that night, anyone taller than George Nostrand, the tallest Husky at 6 ft 8 in (203 cm), was given free admission. Attendance quickly dwindled and the Toronto Star published an estimate that team owners lost $100,000 in one season of operations.

Managing director of the Huskies was Lew Hayman, coach and general manager of the Alouettes and future president of the Toronto Argonauts and the Canadian Football League, who had been a star basketball player at Syracuse University. Charles Watson was team president. Ben Newman and Salter Hayden were the other co-founders. Annis Stukus was also a member of the front office.

Future all-star Ed Sadowski began the season as player-coach and was initially the team's top player. Three weeks into the season, with the team off to a poor start, the Star reported that the players had divided into two or three cliques that rarely spoke to each other. Sadowski's coaching was openly questioned and, just a month after the first game, he quit the team. After four games with interim coaches (Hayman coached one game, and Huskies player Dick Fitzgerald ruled the bench for three games), Hayman hired former Major League Baseball player Red Rolfe, who had also been the coach of Yale University's basketball team.

Hayman traded the playing rights to Sadowski to the Cleveland Rebels for Leo Mogus, at the time one of the league's top scorers. Hayman had previously traded Nostrand to the Rebels for another 6 ft 9 in (206 cm) giant, Kleggie Hermsen. In February 1947 the Huskies acquired the tallest player in the league, 7 ft 1 in (216 cm) Ralph Siewert, from the St. Louis Bombers. Despite his height, Siewert averaged just 1.1 points per game with the Huskies and had the lowest field goal percentage on the team.

The team's leading scorer was Mike McCarron, with 649 points in 60 games. He and Fitzgerald were the only players to appear in every game. Sadowski had the most points per game, averaging 19.1 points over his 10 games with the Huskies. Hank Biasatti and Gino Sovran were the only Canadians on the Huskies, each playing just six games.

Neither of the Huskies' head coaches (or their interim coaches) would coach another game in the BAA/NBA after their time in Toronto. Of the 20 players to make it to the floor for the Huskies, only five would go on to play 10 or more games in the BAA/NBA following the 1946–47 season: Sadowski, Mogus, Hermsen, Nostrand, and Dick Schulz. Hermsen was the last active NBA player from the Huskies roster, retiring in 1953 as a member of the Indianapolis Olympians.

During the BAA's first ever postseason meeting between teams since completing their first ever season, the Huskies joined the Chicago Stags (who had reached as far as the 1947 BAA Finals that season) as one of two teams to remain undecided on whether they would continue onward with playing in the BAA for another season or not. The franchise, which had losses thought to total $60,000 in its first season, would continue to operate long enough to participate in the inaugural 1947 BAA draft at The Leland Hotel, selecting guard/forward Glen Selbo from the University of Wisconsin with the second pick alongside multiple other players like forward/center Red Rocha from Oregon State University (who would be traded to the St. Louis Bombers), Frank Broyles from the Georgia School of Technology (who later became a college football coach and athletic director), former MLB player Wimpy Quinn from the University of Oregon, and Paul Hoffman from Purdue University. However, they would later join the Pittsburgh Ironmen in folding their teams simultaneously on July 27, 1947, joining the Detroit Falcons from July 9 and Cleveland Rebels from June 9 as the first four BAA (now NBA) teams to ever fold in the league's existence.

=== Bring back the Huskies ===
Reviving the Huskies name was originally considered at the time of selecting a name for Toronto's new NBA team in 1995 (marking a return of professional basketball to the city after a 48-year absence). However, management ruled that option out when it became apparent there was no way to design a suitable logo that didn't resemble that of the Minnesota Timberwolves, so they became the Toronto Raptors instead. Nevertheless, a group of fans have created a 'Bring back the Huskies' campaign, complete with a website, TorontoHuskies.org, with the intent of having the franchise revert to the historical 'Huskies' name.

On December 8, 2009, the Raptors introduced a throwback jersey to commemorate the Huskies. The uniforms were the same, except for the different team name and the shorts were longer than the originals. These uniforms were worn in six games in the 2009–10 season and have since been used as "retro" jerseys. On August 23, 2016, the Raptors unveiled the Huskies throwbacks as new alternates, along with their Chinese New Year jerseys. An alternate Air Canada Centre floor with the Huskies dog logo at centre court and the Huskies logomark text at each end was also utilized by the Raptors on these retro nights.

== Season ==
The Huskies played only a single season and never appeared in the playoffs.

Note: W = wins, L = losses, % = win–loss %

Season	W	L	%	Playoffs	Results
Toronto Huskies (BAA)
1946–47	22	38	.367	Did not qualify	
Totals	22	38	.367		
Playoffs	0	0	–		

== Roster ==
- (United States) Mike McCarron G
- (United States) Leo Mogus F/C
- (United States) Red Wallace G
- (United States) Dick Fitzgerald F
- (United States) Kleggie Hermsen F/C
- (United States) Dick Schulz F/G
- (United States) Roy Hurley F/G
- (United States) Bob Mullens G
- (United States) Ed Sadowski C
- (United States) Harry Miller F/C
- (Weimar Republic) / (United States) Charlie Hoefer G
- (United States) Frank Fucarino F
- (United States) Bob Fitzgerald F/C
- (United States) George Nostrand F/C
- (United States) Nat Militzok F
- (United States) Ray Wertis G
- (United States) Ralph Siewert C
- (United States) Ed Kasid G
- (Canada) Gino Sovran F/G
- (Kingdom of Italy) / (Canada) Hank Biasatti G

== Head coaches ==
- Ed Sadowski
- Lew Hayman (interim)
- Dick Fitzgerald
- Robert Rolfe

== See also ==
- Toronto Raptors
- Canada Basketball
