= XEC =

XEC may refer to:

- the NYSE symbol for Cimarex Energy, a defunct US company (acquired by Coterra)
- the IBM 709x and GE-600 execute instruction
- a recombinant COVID virus, a subvariant of the Omicron BA.2.86 lineage, which emerged in 2024
