= Coterra =

Defunct US energy company

Coterra Energy Inc.
- Traded as: NYSE: CTRA
- Industry: Petroleum industry
- Predecessors: Cabot Oil & Gas Corporation; Cimarex Energy
- Founded: 1989; 37 years ago
- Defunct: May 7, 2026; 3 months ago
- Fate: Acquired by Devon Energy
- Headquarters: Houston, Texas, U.S.
- Key people: Thomas E. Jorden (chairman, president & CEO)
- Products: Petroleum; Natural gas; Natural gas liquids
- Revenue: ▲US$7.65 billion (2025)
- Operating income: ▲US$2.45 billion (2025)
- Net income: ▲US$1.72 billion (2025)
- Total assets: ▲US$24.2 billion (2025)
- Total equity: ▲US$14.8 billion (2025)
- Number of employees: 1,075 (2025)

Coterra Energy Inc. was an American company engaged in hydrocarbon exploration. The company had operations in the Permian Basin, Marcellus Shale, and the Anadarko Basin. In May 2026, while ranked 496th in the Fortune 500, the company merged with Devon Energy, and the Coterra name was retired.

As of December 31, 2024, the company had 2,271 million barrels of oil equivalent (1.389×10^{10} GJ) of estimated proved reserves, of which 85% was natural gas, 7% was petroleum, and 8% was natural gas liquids.

== History ==
The company was formed as Cabot Oil & Gas Corporation, a subsidiary of Cabot Corporation. It became a public company via an initial public offering in February 1990. In March 1991, the company became 100% publicly owned.

In 1994, the company acquired Washington Energy Resources for $180 million in stock.

In May 1995, the company ousted John Lollar, its chairman and CEO, in part due to the ill-timing of the acquisition of Washington Energy Resources.

In 1997, the company sold oil reserves and land in northwest Pennsylvania for $92.5 million.

In 2001, the company acquired Cody Energy for $230 million.

In 2013, the company sold its assets in the Marmaton play of Oklahoma and West Texas for $160 million.

In March 2018, the company sold its assets in the Eagle Ford Group to KKR and Venado Oil & Gas for $765 million.

In October 2021, the company acquired Cimarex Energy and was renamed Coterra Energy.

In January 2025, the company acquired Franklin Mountain Energy and Avant Natural Resources for a combined $3.9 billion.

In May 2026, the company was acquired by Devon Energy.

== Environmental issues ==
=== Water contamination in Dimock ===
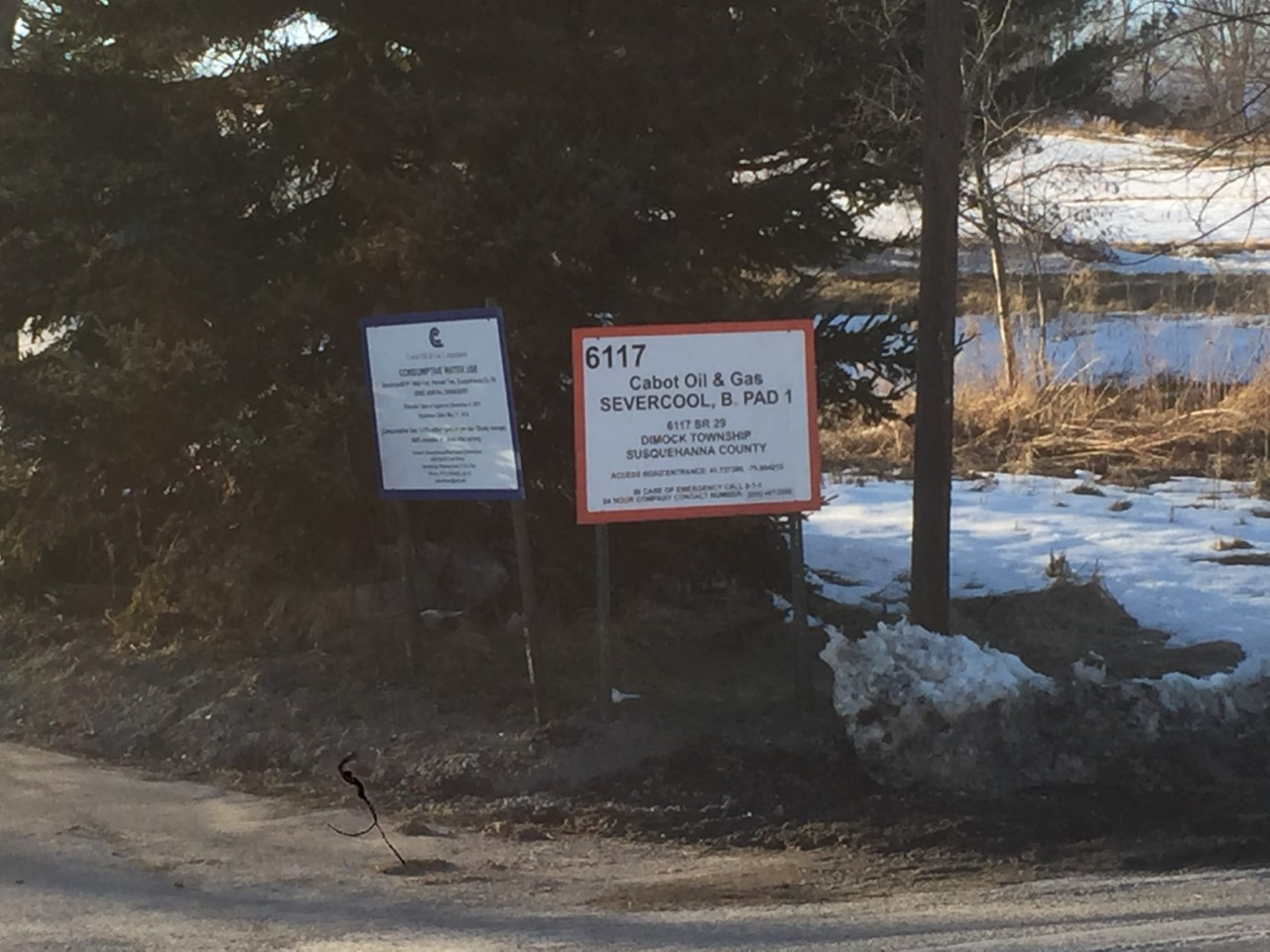
Fracking in Dimock

Carter Road and State Route 3023 in Dimock Township, Susquehanna County, Pennsylvania, which sits above the Marcellus Shale, was the site of water contamination from hydraulic fracturing by the company, and the subject of the documentary Gasland (2010). In 2009, 13 water wells were contaminated with methane, and one exploded. Arsenic, barium, DEHP, glycol compounds, manganese, phenol, and sodium were found in unacceptable levels in the wells.

The company was required to financially compensate residents and provide alternative sources of water until mitigation systems were installed in affected wells. The company denied that hydraulic fracturing was involved.

In May 2012, after the installation of water treatment systems in affected homes, the United States Environmental Protection Agency reported that methane and arsenic were found only in one well. The company said that that the methane was preexisting.

In June 2020, the company was sued by Pennsylvania Attorney General Josh Shapiro.

In 2022, the company pleaded no contest for contaminating well water and agreed to pay $16.29 million to American Water Works to construct a new means of water supply to its residents and agreed to make 75 years of water bills payments for the impacted residents. As part of the settlement, the 12-year moratorium against fracking by the company was removed effective in October 2024 as politicians wanted to appeal to voters who are pro-fracking.

=== Well contamination in Lenox Township ===
In July 2025, the company was fined $299,000 for contaminating 13 wells in Lenox Township, Susquehanna County, Pennsylvania.
