= Devon Energy =

American energy company

Devon Energy Corporation
- Type: Public
- Traded as: NYSE: DVN; S&P 500 component
- Industry: Petroleum industry
- Founded: 1971; 55 years ago
- Founders: John Nichols; J. Larry Nichols
- Headquarters: Houston, Texas, U.S.
- Key people: Clay Gaspar (CEO & president); Jeffrey L. Ritenour (CFO)
- Products: Petroleum; Natural gas Natural gas liquids
- Production output: 840 thousand barrels of oil equivalent (5,100,000 GJ) per day (2025)
- Revenue: ▲US$17.188 billion (2025)
- Net income: ▼US$2.642 billion (2025)
- Total assets: ▲US$31.599 billion (2025)
- Total equity: ▲US$15.528 billion (2025)
- Number of employees: 2,200 (2025)
- Website: devonenergy.com

Devon Energy Corporation is an American company engaged in hydrocarbon exploration. It is organized in Delaware with headquarters in Houston, Texas. Its operations are in the Delaware Basin, Eagle Ford Group, and the Rocky Mountains (Williston Basin and Powder River Basin).

The company was ranked 259th on the Fortune 500 in 2026, while Coterra Energy, newly acquired that May, was ranked 496th. It is also ranked 607th on the Forbes Global 2000.

As of December 31, 2025, the company had proved reserves of 2,428 million barrels of oil equivalent (1.485×10^{10} GJ), of which 40% was petroleum, 30% was natural gas liquids, and 30% was natural gas.

== History ==
Devon was founded in 1971 by John Nichols (1914-2008) and his son, J. Larry Nichols. In 1988, the company became a public company via an initial public offering.

In October 2012, the company completed construction of its current headquarters, the 50-story Devon Energy Center in Oklahoma City, Oklahoma and closed its office in the Allen Center in Downtown Houston.

In February 2016, Devon announced plans to lay off 1,000 employees, including 700 in Oklahoma City, and cut its quarterly dividend to $0.06 per share due to low prices of its products. In 2021, it instituted a fixed plus variable dividend structure that resulted in a record high dividend.

In November 2019, a blowout at a Devon natural gas well prompted authorities to seal off thousands of acres of land near the Eagle Ford Shale towns of Yorktown, Texas and Nordheim, Texas until the well was capped. It took 35 hours to get the issue under control. The company paid $48,750 in fines for the incident.

In September 2021, the company agreed to pay $6.15 million to resolve allegations that it violated the False Claims Act of 1863 by underpaying and underreporting royalties for natural gas from federal lands in Wyoming and New Mexico.

Met with pressure to enhance performance and consider asset sales by Kimmeridge Energy Management, which had gained a stake in late 2025; in 2026, a second activist investor, Toms Capital Investment ‌Management, acquired a significant stake in the company, while advocating for faster asset sales.

=== Acquisitions ===
#	Year	Company	Price	Description of Assets	Ref(s).
1	February 1992	Hondo Oil and Gas	$122 million	Oil and gas reserves and seven natural gas processing plants	
2	January 1996	Kerr-McGee	$250 million	North American onshore oil and gas properties; 370,000 net acres of undeveloped drilling rights	
3	July 1998	Northstar Energy	$750 million	Oil and gas properties in Canada	
4	August 1999	PennzEnergy	$2.2 billion	Oil and gas properties in the Gulf of Mexico	
5	May 2000	Santa Fe Snyder	$3.35 billion	Oil and gas properties in the Permian Basin, Rocky Mountains, and the Gulf of Mexico	
6	September 2001	Anderson Exploration	$4.6 billion	Oil and gas properties in Canada	
7	August 2002	Mitchell Energy	$3.1 billion	Oil and gas properties in the Barnett Shale of Texas	
8	April 2003	Ocean Energy	$5.3 billion	Deepwater sites in the Gulf of Mexico	
9	May 2006	Chief Oil & Gas	$2.2 billion	Barnett Shale leaseholds	
10	February 2014	GeoSouthern Energy	$6.1 billion	Eagle Ford assets	
11	March 2014	Crosstex Energy		Merger of midstream assets to form EnLink Midstream, LLC	
12	December 2015	Felix Energy	$2.5 billion	Oil and gas properties in the Powder River Basin and Anadarko Basin	
13	January 2021	WPX Energy	$2.56 billion	Oil and gas properties in the Williston Basin and the Permian Basin	
14	July 2022	RimRock Oil and Gas	$865 million	Williston Basin assets	
15	September 2022	Validus Energy	$1.8 billion	Eagle Ford assets	
16	October 2024	Grayson Mill Energy	$5 billion	Williston Basin assets	
17	May 2026	Coterra	$26 billion in stock	Assets in the Permian Basin, Marcellus Shale, and the Anadarko Basin	

=== Divestitures ===
#	Year	Buyer	Price	Description of Assets	Ref(s).
1	March 2010	BP	$7 billion	Assets in Brazil, Azerbaijan, and the Gulf of Mexico	
2	April 2014	Canadian Natural Resources	C$3.125 billion	Conventional assets in Canada	
3	June 2014	Linn Energy	$2.3 billion	900,000 net acres in the Rockies, Mid-Continent, east Texas, north Louisiana, and south Texas	
4	July 2017	Penn Virginia	$340 million	Lavaca County assets in the Eagle Ford	
5	June 2019	Canadian Natural Resources	C$3.8 billion	Assets in Canada	
6	October 2020	Banpu Kalnin Ventures (BKV)	$770 million	Assets in the Barnett Shale	

=== CEOs ===
- J. Larry Nichols (1980-2010)
- John Richels (2010-2015)
- Dave Hager (2015-2021)
- Rick Muncrief (2021-2025)
- Clay Gaspar (2025-)

== Political activity ==
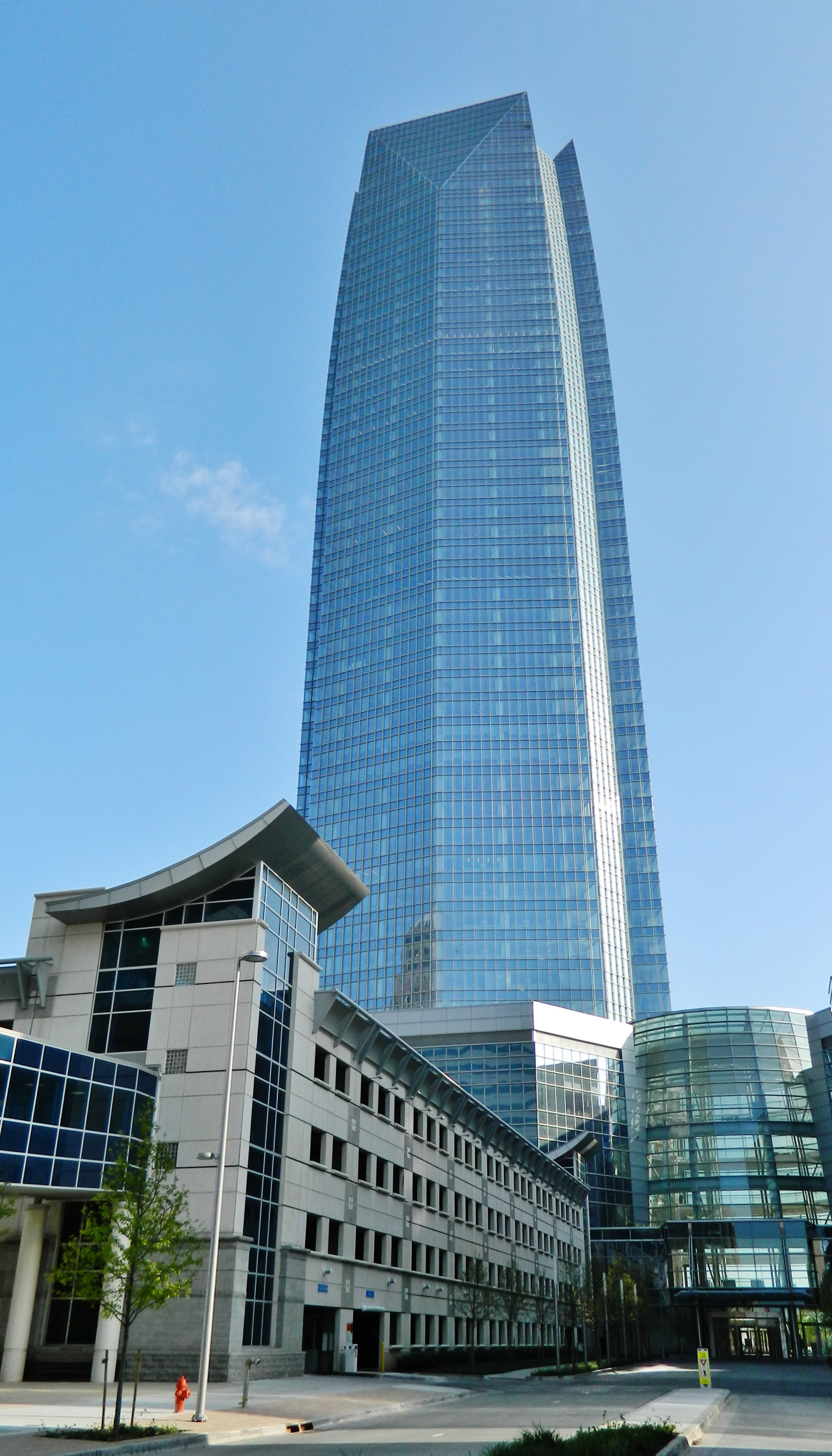
The Devon Energy Center in Oklahoma City, Oklahoma, the headquarters of Devon Energy.

Devon has contributed millions of dollars to politicians and political organizations, almost entirely to organizations and individuals affiliated with the Republican Party.

After agreeing with the Obama administration to install systems to control the illegal emission of hazardous chemicals, Devon backed out of such agreements during the first presidency of Donald Trump due to rollbacks of environmental regulations.

In 2014, an investigation by The New York Times uncovered that a three-page letter signed by Scott Pruitt, then the Attorney General of Oklahoma, to the United States Environmental Protection Agency advocating for a relaxing of laws related to hydraulic fracturing was actually written by lobbyists for Devon Energy and not by Pruitt.
