= Bob Mullens =

American basketball player (born 1922)

Personal information
- Born: November 1, 1922 Brooklyn, New York, U.S.
- Died: July 22, 1989 (aged 66) Staten Island, New York, U.S.
- Listed height: 6 ft 1 in (1.85 m)
- Listed weight: 175 lb (79 kg)

Career information
- High school: Brooklyn Prep (Brooklyn, New York)
- College: Fordham (1941–1944)
- Position: Guard
- Number: 10, 11, 17

Career history
- 1946–1947: New York Knicks
- 1947: Toronto Huskies

Career highlights
- Second-team All-American – Helms, SN (1943); No. 7 retired by Fordham Rams
- Stats at NBA.com
- Stats at Basketball Reference

Robert Joseph Mullens (November 1, 1922 – July 22, 1989) was an American professional basketball player. An All-American at Fordham University, Mullens played one full season in the Basketball Association of America (which merged with the National Basketball League in 1949 to create the National Basketball Association), splitting the 1946–47 season between the New York Knicks and the Toronto Huskies.

== High school and college ==
Mullens played high school basketball at Brooklyn Prep, where he was a prodigious scorer, setting the New York City Catholic League scoring mark. Upon graduation, Mullens chose hometown Fordham. At Fordham, Mullens led the Rams to the 1943 National Invitation Tournament semifinals and at the close of the season was named an All-American by Sporting News magazine and the Helms Athletic Foundation.

== Professional career ==
Mullens later was a player in the inaugural season of the BAA. He started the season with the New York Knicks, averaging 2.9 points in 26 games. He was traded to the Toronto Huskies for fellow Fordham alumnus Bob Fitzgerald on January 21, 1947. With the Huskies, he averaged 8.5 points per game in 28 contests.

Mullens was the first player in NBA/BAA history to play a game on his birthday; on November 1, 1946 (Mullens' 24th birthday), the New York Knicks, whom Mullens played for, defeated the Toronto Huskies 68–66 in the inaugural BAA game for both franchises. Mullens scored 0 points, went 0–1 from the free throw line, and recorded one personal foul.

Following the close of his professional basketball career, Mullens became a bond specialist in New York City. He died on July 22, 1989, in Staten Island, New York.

== BAA career statistics ==
Legend
GP	Games played	FG%	Field-goal percentage
FT%	Free-throw percentage	APG	Assists per game
PPG	Points per game	**Bold**	Career high

=== Regular season ===
Year	Team	GP	FG%	FT%	APG	PPG
1946–47	New York	26	.260	**.647**	.7	2.9
1946–47	Toronto	**28**	**.287**	.618	**1.3**	**8.5**
Career		54	.281	.627	1.0	5.8
