= Roy Hurley =

American basketball player (1922–1993)

Personal information
- Born: August 12, 1922 Arcadia, California
- Died: October 14, 1993 (aged 71) Indianapolis, Indiana
- Listed height: 6 ft 2 in (1.88 m)
- Listed weight: 170 lb (77 kg)

Career information
- High school: Arsenal Technical (Indianapolis, Indiana)
- Playing career: 1945–1948
- Position: Forward / guard
- Number: 21

Career history
- 1945–1946: Indianapolis Kautskys
- 1946–1947: Toronto Huskies
- 1947–1948: Tri-Cities Blackhawks
- 1948: Syracuse Nationals
- Stats at NBA.com
- Stats at Basketball Reference

Roy Leonard Hurley (August 12, 1922 – October 14, 1993) was an American professional basketball player. He spent two seasons in the National Basketball League (NBL) and one season in the Basketball Association of America (BAA). He played for the Indianapolis Kautskys (NBL, 1945–46), the Toronto Huskies (BAA, 1946–47), the Tri-Cities Blackhawks (NBL, 1947–48), and the Syracuse Nationals (NBL, 1947–48).

Hurley died on October 14, 1993.

== BAA career statistics ==
Legend
GP	Games played
FG%	Field-goal percentage
FT%	Free-throw percentage
APG	Assists per game
PPG	Points per game

=== Regular season ===
Year	Team	GP	FG%	FT%	APG	PPG
1946–47	Toronto	46	.224	.609	.7	5.2
Career		46	.224	.609	.7	5.2
