= Ralph Siewert =

American basketball player (1923–1990)

Personal information
- Born: December 31, 1923 Bloomfield Hills, Michigan, U.S.
- Died: November 21, 1990 (aged 66) Mount Clemens, Michigan, U.S.
- Listed height: 7 ft 1 in (2.16 m)
- Listed weight: 230 lb (104 kg)

Career information
- High school: Mount Clemens (Mount Clemens, Michigan)
- College: Dakota Wesleyan (1945–1946)
- Playing career: 1946–1947
- Position: Center
- Number: 14, 20

Career history
- 1947: St. Louis Bombers
- 1947: Toronto Huskies
- Stats at NBA.com
- Stats at Basketball Reference

Ralph Paul Siewert (December 31, 1923 – November 21, 1990) was an American professional basketball player. He played for the St. Louis Bombers and Toronto Huskies during the inaugural 1946–47 season of the Basketball Association of America. At 7 feet 1 inch (2.16 m) tall, he was the first seven-footer to play professional basketball.

== Career ==
At high school in Mount Clemens, Michigan, Siewart was both a center in basketball and a first baseman in baseball.

In 1944, he was a batting practice pitcher for the Detroit Tigers. Ideally, the team would have sent him to the minor leagues for experience, but the team could not imagine him folding his long legs on bus rides. He also played for the New York Yankees as well as other farm teams. His baseball career ended after suffering an elbow injury when he was hit by a drive from Rudy York.

Siewert then went to college at Dakota Wesleyan University, where Siewert earned the nickname "Sky", and later "Timber." His college career ended prematurely when it was discovered that he had pitched professionally. Afterwards, he signed to play American football with the Chicago Rockets of the All-America Football Conference.

Siewert started his professional basketball career with the St. Louis Bombers. Fans started calling Siewert "Timber" because he kept falling like a tree when knocked down by stronger players. In February 1947, the Toronto Huskies acquired Siewert. Siewert averaged just 1.1 points per game with the Huskies and had the lowest field goal percentage on the team.

Siewert scored a total of 20 points in his 21-game career.

== BAA career statistics ==
Legend
GP	Games played	FG%	Field-goal percentage
FT%	Free-throw percentage	APG	Assists per game
PPG	Points per game	**Bold**	Career high

=== Regular season ===
Year	Team	GP	FG%	FT%	APG	PPG
1946–47	St. Louis	7	.077	.400	.0	.6
1946–47	Toronto	**14**	**.161**	**.600**	**.3**	**1.1**
Career		21	.136	.533	.2	1.0
