= Red Rolfe =

American baseball player and manager (1908-1969)

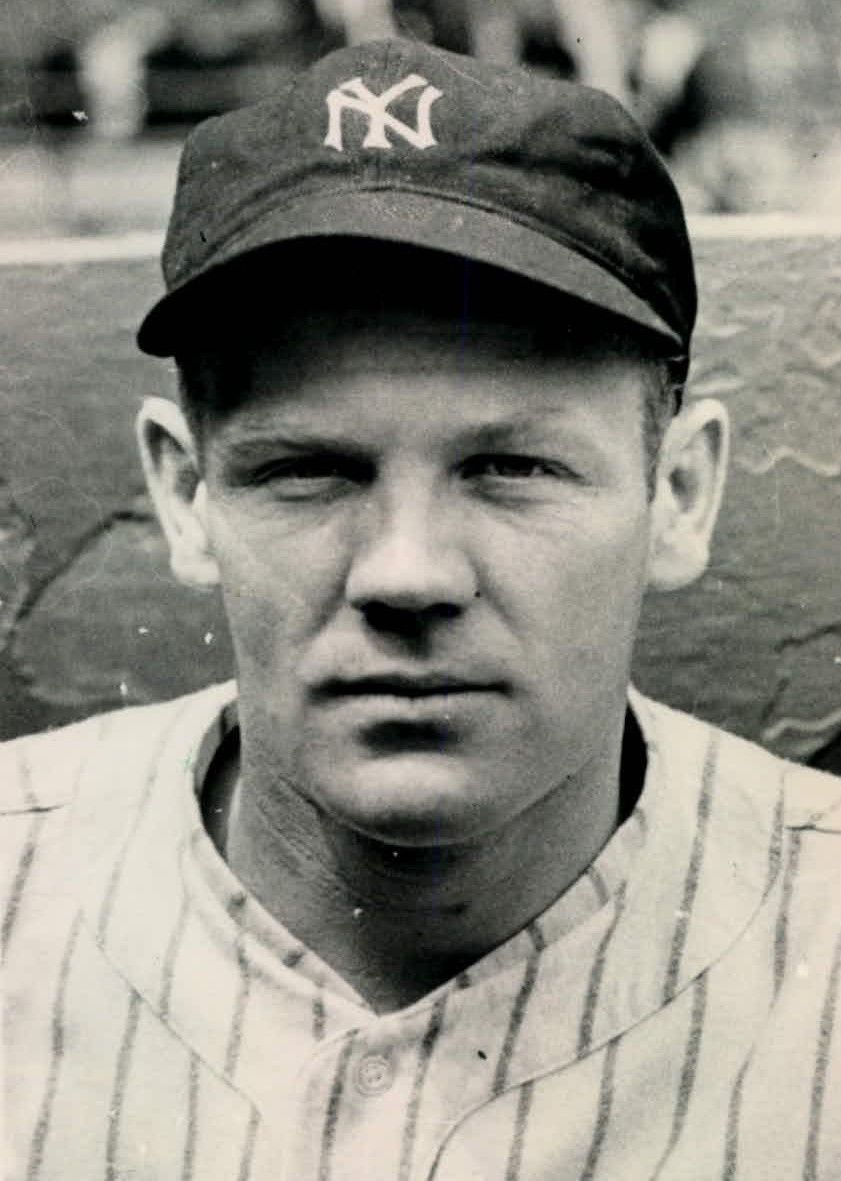
- Third baseman / Manager
- Born: October 17, 1908; Penacook, New Hampshire, U.S.
- Died: July 8, 1969 (aged 60); Gilford, New Hampshire, U.S.
- Batted: Left Threw: Right

MLB debut
- June 29, 1931, for the New York Yankees

Last MLB appearance
- September 27, 1942, for the New York Yankees

MLB statistics
- Batting average: .289
- Home runs: 69
- Runs batted in: 497
- Managerial record: 278–256
- Winning %: .521
- Stats at Baseball Reference

Teams
- As player: New York Yankees (1931, 1934–1942); As manager: Detroit Tigers (1949–1952)

Career highlights and awards
- 4× All-Star (1937–1940); 5× World Series champion (1936–1939, 1941)

Robert Abial "Red" Rolfe (October 17, 1908 – July 8, 1969) was an American baseball third baseman, manager and front-office executive in Major League Baseball (MLB). He played in MLB for the New York Yankees from 1931 to 1942 and managed the Detroit Tigers from 1949 to 1952.

Rolfe was a native of Penacook, New Hampshire. He graduated from Phillips Exeter Academy and Dartmouth College and signed with the Yankees. Rolfe played in four MLB All-Star Games and won five World Series championships before he retired after the 1942 season. He coached in college baseball for Yale University from 1943 to 1946 and served as athletic director for Dartmouth from 1954 to 1967, while coaching baseball during the 1954 and 1955 seasons.

== Early life and amateur career ==
Rolfe was born on October 17, 1908, in Penacook, New Hampshire. His father, Herbert, earned a living in the lumber business. Rolfe was the fifth of seven children; he had four older sisters and one younger sister. A younger brother died in infancy in 1910.

While he was in the seventh grade, Rolfe started to play for Penacook High School's baseball team, as the school did not have enough players. Playing for Penacook's team again in the eighth grade, the school won the league championship. He played for Penacook's baseball team in all four years that he was a student at the school, before he graduated in 1926. Rolfe then attended Phillips Exeter Academy for one year and played as a shortstop on their baseball team, which was managed by Simmy Murch. At Phillips Exeter, he began to be known as "Red" due to the color of his hair.

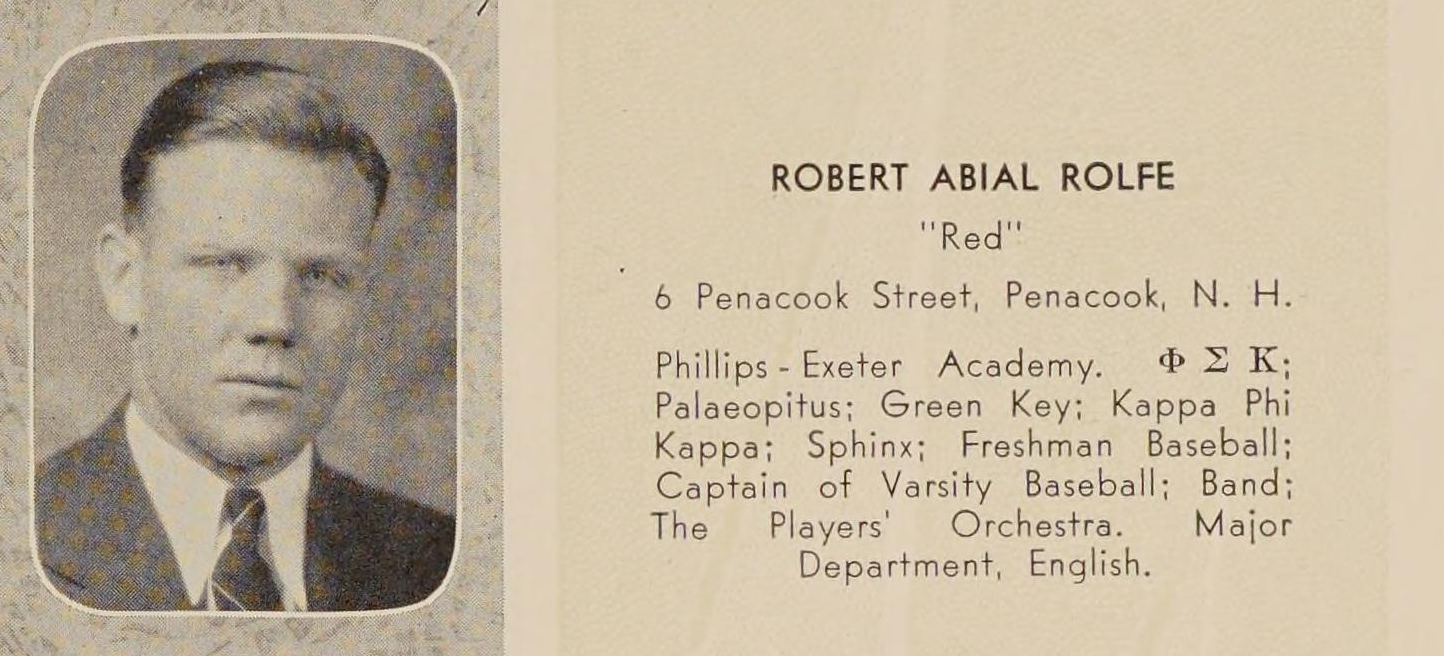
Rolfe in the Dartmouth College yearbook, 1931

Rolfe enrolled at Dartmouth College and played college baseball for the Dartmouth Indians. He played on the freshman team as their shortstop in his first year and was team captain. He also played for the football and basketball teams. Rolfe then played for three years on the varsity team for the next three years, under head coach Jeff Tesreau as a shortstop. Tesreau made Rolfe his cleanup hitter. While a student at Dartmouth, Rolfe spent the summer of 1930 playing for the Orleans town team in the Cape Cod Baseball League, where he was managed by longtime major league player and manager Patsy Donovan. Rolfe graduated from Dartmouth in 1931.

== Professional career ==
During the 1931 collegiate season, Rolfe met with Connie Mack, the manager of the Philadelphia Athletics, while Dartmouth was playing the Penn Quakers. Rather than sign with the Athletics, scout Gene McCann signed Rolfe to the New York Yankees days after his graduation from Dartmouth for $600 per month and a $5,000 signing bonus.

Rolfe reported directly to the Yankees and made his professional debut with the Yankees on June 29 as a defensive replacement. It was customary at the time for the Yankees to introduce a prospect to the major leagues briefly before sending him to the minor leagues. In July, the Yankees optioned Rolfe to the Albany Senators of the Eastern League. He batted .333 in 58 games for Albany. Assigned to the Newark Bears of the International League in 1932, Rolfe took the starting shortstop job from Bobby Stevens. Rolfe batted .330 in 147 games for Newark in 1932, as Newark won the International League pennant. Returning to Newark for the 1933 season, Rolfe batted .326 and won the International League Most Valuable Player Award as Newark again won the pennant.

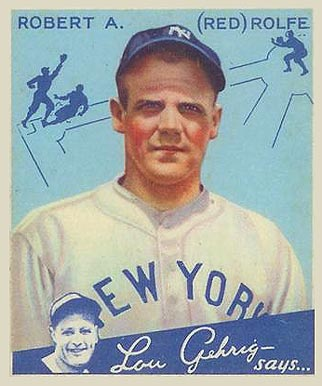
Rolfe's 1934 Goudey baseball card

Rolfe became the Yankees starting shortstop in 1934, with Don Heffner, who played second base alongside Rolfe with Newark, becoming the Yankees' starting second baseman, and second baseman Tony Lazzeri and shortstop Frankie Crosetti playing as third basemen. However, Heffner struggled and manager Joe McCarthy decided that Rolfe's throwing arm made him a better third baseman, as Lazzeri moved back to second base and Crosetti returned to shortstop. He batted .287 in 89 games, as a knee injury experienced when he collided with Max Bishop of the Boston Red Sox limited his playing time. Rolfe became their starting third baseman in 1935.

During his major league playing career, Rolfe was the starting third baseman on the New York Yankees of the late 1930s. The "Bronx Bombers" of Lou Gehrig, Joe DiMaggio, Bill Dickey, Lefty Gomez and Red Ruffing won American League pennants from 1936–39 and took all four World Series in which they appeared, winning 16 games and losing only three in Fall Classic play over that span. After finishing third in 1940, the Yankees rebounded to win league titles in 1941–42, and the World Series in the former year, before finally bowing in 1942.

Rolfe played ten major league seasons, all with New York, batting .289 with 1,394 hits, 69 home runs and 497 runs batted in (RBIs) in 1,175 games. His finest season came in 1939, when he led the American League with 213 hits, 139 runs scored, and 46 doubles while hitting .329 with 14 home runs and 80 RBIs. In six World Series, Rolfe appeared in 28 games, all as the Yankees' starting third-sacker; he collected 33 hits and batted .284, with a fielding percentage of .944 in 71 chances. He was the Junior Circuit's starting third baseman in the 1937 and 1939 Major League Baseball All-Star Games — both American League victories — and went three-for-eight (.375) at the plate, with a triple. Rolfe started in the 1939 All-Star Game alongside teammates Joe DiMaggio, Bill Dickey, Joe Gordon, and George Selkirk.

During the 1940-1941 offseason, Rolfe developed colitis. He batted .300 in the 1941 World Series, as Rolfe won his fifth World Series title. In 1942, the colitis reduced Rolfe to a part-time player. His weight dropped from 172 pounds (78 kg) to 138 pounds (63 kg). He batted .219 in 69 games and retired at the end of the season.

== College and MLB coach ==
During Rolfe's final season with the Yankees, on September 10, 1942, Rolfe accepted the positions of head baseball and basketball coach for Yale University, beginning after the season, on November 1. With Rolfe as their coach, the Yale Bulldogs baseball team had a 56–17 (.767) record and the Yale Bulldogs men's basketball team had a 34–10 (.773) record.

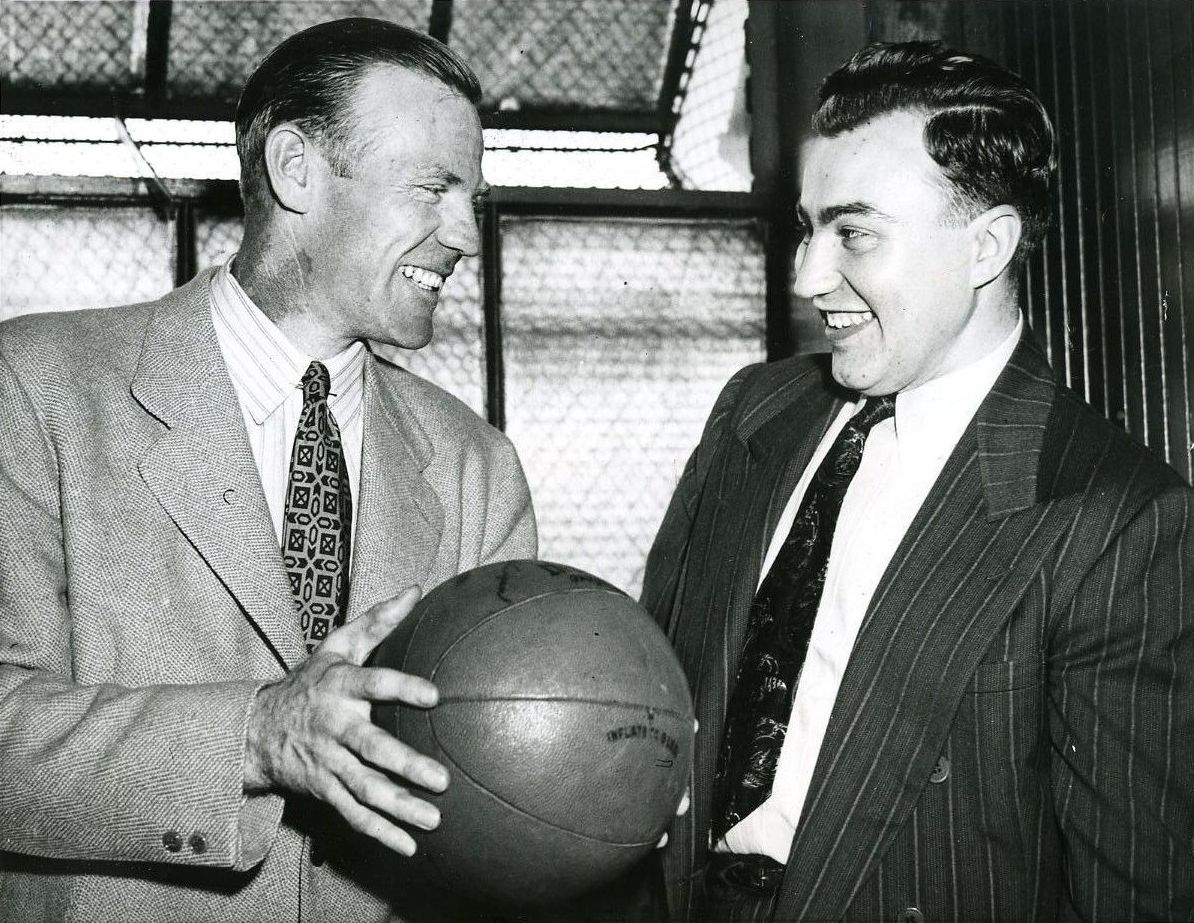
Rolfe (left) and Ray Meyer in 1942

After his four-year coaching stint at Yale, Rolfe accepted a position as a coach on McCarthy's staff for the Yankees for the 1946 season. In December 1946, the Toronto Huskies of the Basketball Association of America (BAA) hired Rolfe to replace Ed Sadowski as their coach in the midst of the 1946–47 BAA season. Rolfe led the Huskies to a 17–27 (.386) record as their coach as the Huskies finished the season tied for last place with a .367 winning percentage. Due to poor attendance and an estimated loss of $40,000 to $50,000, the Huskies folded after the season.

The Detroit Tigers hired Rolfe in August 1947 as the director of their scouting department. In November, the Tigers named Rolfe the director of their farm system. Under Rolfe's direction, the Seattle Indians of the Pacific Coast League joined the Tigers' farm system in December.

== Detroit Tigers manager (1949-1952) ==
After the 1948 season, the Tigers hired Rolfe as manager, succeededing Steve O'Neill. Rolfe instituted rules that his players did not agree with, such as no shaving or beer in the clubhouse and no meals between doubleheaders.

In 1949, Rolfe's first season as manager, the Tigers improved by nine games and returned to the first division. Then, in 1950, the Tigers maintained a close race with the Yankees, winning 95 games and finishing in second place, three games behind. A fluke botched double play proved the team's undoing. Late in September at Cleveland, the Indians had the bases loaded in the tenth inning with one out and the score tied. Visibility was poor because smoke from Canadian forest fires was blowing across Lake Erie. On an apparent 3-2-3 double-play grounder to first base, Detroit catcher Aaron Robinson thought he simply needed to touch home plate for a force play to retire the Indians' baserunner, Bob Lemon, charging in from third. But in the smoky conditions Robinson had not seen that a putout had already been made at first base, necessitating that the catcher tag the runner, not the plate, to record an out. Robinson mistakenly tagged the plate, Lemon's run counted and Cleveland won the game. The Sporting News named Rolfe their Manager of the Year, while he finished in third place in balloting for the Associated Press' Manager of the Year Award, behind Eddie Sawyer of the Philadelphia Phillies and Casey Stengel of the Yankees.

Beset by an aging starting rotation, the Tigers slipped in 1951, finishing in fifth place with a .474 mark, 25 games behind the first-place Yankees. During the season, Tigers owner Walter Briggs replaced Billy Evans as general manager with Charlie Gehringer, and after the season, he replaced Ray Kennedy as the director of the farm system with Muddy Ruel. The Tigers retained Rolfe as their manager, however.

The Tigers began the 1952 season by losing their first eight games. Sportswriter Gordon Cobbledick reported in April that the players' antipathy towards Rolfe was the cause of their struggles. Though Gehringer and the players, led by pitcher Fred Hutchinson, publicly refuted Cobbledick's story. Hal Newhouser later acknowledged that Rolfe's strict policies had alienated the players, but also said that the trade of George Kell, Dizzy Trout, Johnny Lipon, and Hoot Evers to the Boston Red Sox also hurt team morale. With the Tigers in last place in May, Gehringer publicly affirmed that Rolfe would remain the manager of the Tigers. The Tigers won only 23 of 72 games (.319) before the Tigers fired Rolfe on July 5 and replaced him as manager with Hutchinson. The 1952 club won only 50 games, losing 104 – the first time ever that the Tigers lost 100 or more games.

== Dartmouth athletic director ==
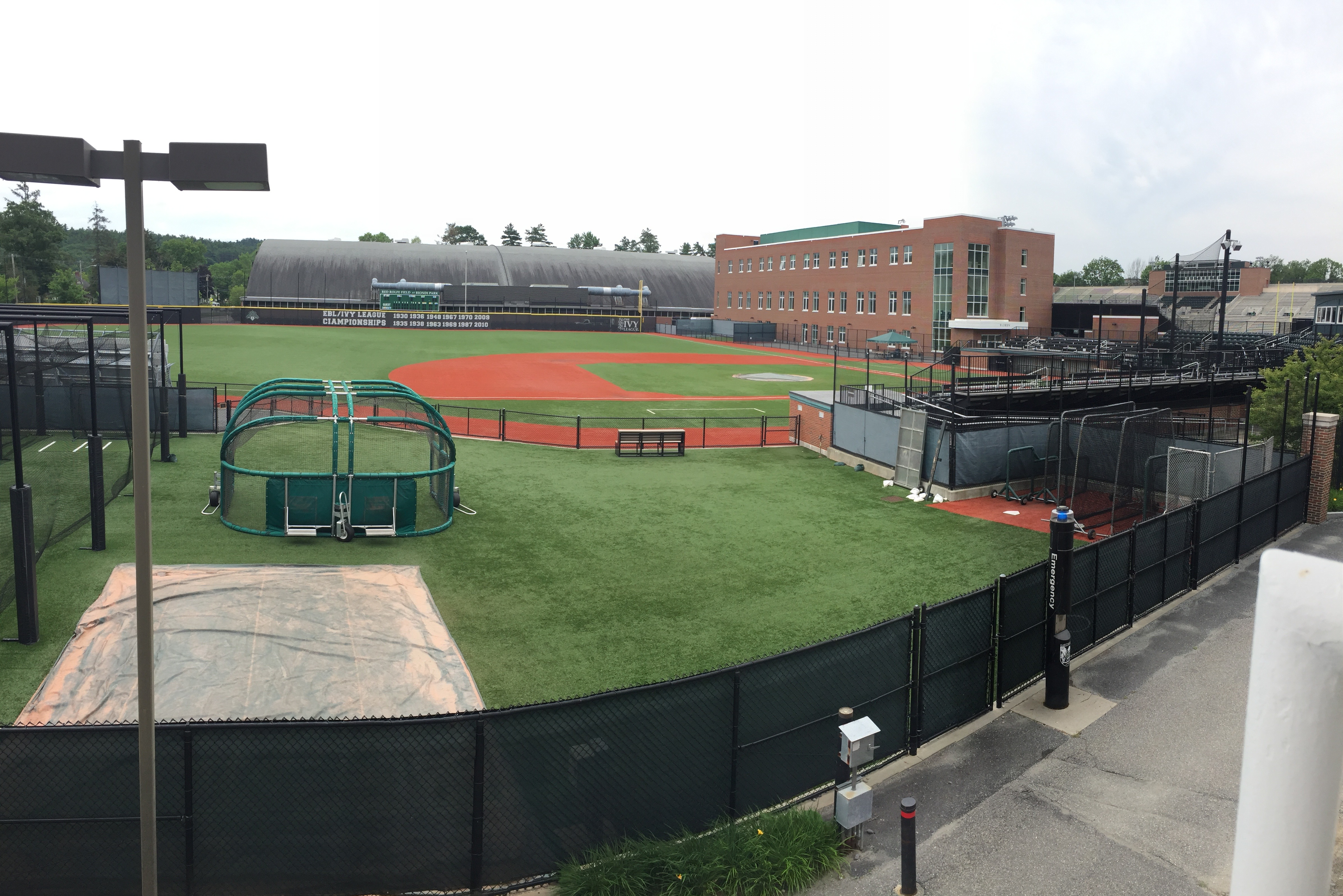
Red Rolfe Field at Biondi Park in 2017

Rolfe then returned to Dartmouth on July 1, 1954, as the new athletic director, succeeding William H. McCarter. In 1956, he hired Tony Lupien as Dartmouth's new baseball coach. He also hired Bob Blackman to coach the Dartmouth Big Green football team, Abner Oakes to coach the Dartmouth Big Green men's ice hockey team, and Dave Gavitt to coach the Dartmouth Big Green men's basketball team. Dartmouth built the Leverone Field House while Rolfe was athletic director. Dartmouth's football team won the Lambert-Meadowlands Trophy in 1965. Rolfe stepped down from the position in 1967 and followed by Seaver Peters.

The Boston Baseball Writers Association gave Rolfe their Old-Timers Award in 1966. In 1969, Dartmouth renamed their college baseball diamond, previously known as Memorial Field, naming it Red Rolfe Field in his honor. In the 1970s, Dartmouth created the Red Rolfe Award, presented to a non-student for their contributions to Dartmouth's athletics department.

== Personal life ==
Rolfe married Isabel (née Africa) on October 12, 1934. His older sister, Florence, introduced the two to each other in 1928. After he retired from Dartmouth, the couple lived on Governors Island on Lake Winnipesaukee, which is part of the town of Gilford, New Hampshire.

Rolfe had a colostomy in February 1967, and was hospitalized for three weeks. He died in Gilford, on July 8, 1969, at age 60 of chronic kidney disease. He was buried in his birthplace of Penacook after a private ceremony.

With the dissolution of the Eastern Intercollegiate Baseball League in 1992, the Ivy League reformed into two divisions for baseball in 1993: the Red Rolfe Division and the Lou Gehrig Division.

== Head coaching record ==
Legend
| Regular season | G | Games coached | W | Games won | L | Games lost | W–L % | Win–loss % |
| Playoffs | PG | Playoff games | PW | Playoff wins | PL | Playoff losses | PW–L % | Playoff win–loss % |

| Team | Year | G | W | L | W–L% | Finish | PG | PW | PL | PW–L% | Result |
|---|---|---|---|---|---|---|---|---|---|---|---|
| Toronto | 1946–47 | 44 | 17 | 27 | .386 | 6th in Eastern | — | — | — | — | Missed playoffs |

== See also ==
- List of Major League Baseball annual runs scored leaders
- List of Major League Baseball annual doubles leaders
- List of Major League Baseball annual triples leaders
- List of Major League Baseball players who spent their entire career with one franchise
