= J. Larry Nichols =

American lawyer and business executive (born 1942)

John Larry Nichols
- Born: July 6, 1942 (age 84); Oklahoma City, Oklahoma, U.S.
- Education: Princeton University (BA); University of Michigan (JD)
- Known for: Co-founder of Devon Energy
- Spouse: Polly (married 1972)
- Children: 2

John Larry Nichols (born July 6, 1942) is the co-founder and former chairman, president, and chief executive officer of Devon Energy. He is a member of the board of directors of Baker Hughes and Sonic Drive-In.

== Early life and education ==
In 1960, Nichols graduated from Casady School in Oklahoma City. In 1964, he received a B.A. in Geology from Princeton University. In 1967, he received a J.D. from the University of Michigan Law School.

== Career ==
After graduating, he w as a law clerk to both Associate Justice Tom C. Clark and Chief Justice Earl Warren of the Supreme Court of the United States. He also worked for William Rehnquist when Rehnquist was the United States Assistant Attorney General.

In 1971, along with his father, John Nichols, an oilman, J. Larry Nichols co-founded Devon Energy. He was chief executive officer of the company from 1980 to 2010, was president from 1976 until 2003, was chairman from 2000 to 2012, and was executive chairman from 2013 to 2016.

In 2001, he was inducted into the Oklahoma Hall of Fame.

== Personal life ==
In 1972, Nichols married Polly. They have two children: a daughter, Sally, and a son, Tyler.

=== Politics ===
Nichols is a Republican.

In the third quarter of 2014, just before the midterm elections, Nichols made a $136,000 contribution to the Republican "Targeted State Victory" committee.

In 2015, Nichols agreed to lead the energy steering committee of Florida Senator Marco Rubio and made a $50,000 contribution to the political action committee supporting Rubio. Nichols stated that "excessive regulation squashes" energy innovation.

Nichols has contributed to Oklahoma Strong, the political action committee supporting Scott Pruitt.

=== Philanthropy ===
Nichols is the namesake of the J. Larry Nichols Community Foundation Scholar Award by the Oklahoma City Community Foundation.

== See also ==
- List of law clerks for the chief justice of the United States
- List of law clerks for the tenth seat of the Supreme Court of the United States
