= Ed Kasid =

Polish American basketball player

Personal information
- Born: August 13, 1923 Minneapolis, Minnesota, U.S.
- Died: November 3, 1989 (aged 66)
- Listed height: 5 ft 11 in (1.80 m)
- Listed weight: 185 lb (84 kg)

Career information
- High school: Minneapolis Vocational (Minneapolis, Minnesota)
- Playing career: 1946–1947
- Position: Guard
- Number: 19

Career history
- 1946–1947: Toronto Huskies
- Stats at NBA.com
- Stats at Basketball Reference

Edward John Kasid (August 13, 1923 – November 3, 1989) was a Polish American professional basketball player. He spent one season in the Basketball Association of America (BAA) as a member of the Toronto Huskies during the 1946–47 season. He was born in Minnesota to Joseph and Josephine Kasid. Kasid attended Minneapolis Vocational High School.

== BAA career statistics ==
Legend
GP	Games played
FG%	Field-goal percentage
FT%	Free-throw percentage
APG	Assists per game
PPG	Points per game

=== Regular season ===
Year	Team	GP	FG%	FT%	APG	PPG
1946–47	Toronto	8	.286	.000	.8	1.5
Career		8	.286	.000	.8	1.5
