= Harry Miller (basketball, born 1923) =

American basketball player and coach

Personal information
- Born: July 28, 1923 Brooklyn, New York, U.S.
- Died: April 18, 2007 (aged 83) Latrobe, Pennsylvania, U.S.
- Listed height: 6 ft 4 in (1.93 m)
- Listed weight: 230 lb (104 kg)

Career information
- High school: Seton Hall Prep (West Orange, New Jersey)
- Position: Center / power forward
- Number: 15

Career history
- 1946–1947: Toronto Huskies
- Stats at NBA.com
- Stats at Basketball Reference

Harry David "Moose" Miller (July 28, 1923 – April 18, 2007) was an American professional basketball player. He played one season for the Toronto Huskies of the Basketball Association of America (BAA).

Miller, a 6'4" center and power forward, attended Seton Hall University and later the University of North Carolina at Chapel Hill while in the U. S. Marine Corps. He then played one season in the BAA for the Toronto Huskies in the 1946–47 season and has the distinction of playing in the first game of what would become the National Basketball Association (NBA). Miller averaged 2.9 points per game in 55 appearances in his sole season in the league. He played the next season with the Atlanta Crackers of the upstart Professional Basketball League of America, averaging 4.0 points per game in four contests.

After his playing career, Miller coached at the high school (Derry Area High School), junior college (Westmoreland County Community College) and college (Saint Vincent College) levels in Western Pennsylvania. He died on April 18, 2007.

Miller's son Mark Miller is a mixed martial arts competitor.

== BAA career statistics ==
Legend
GP	Games played
FG%	Field-goal percentage
FT%	Free-throw percentage
APG	Assists per game
PPG	Points per game

=== Regular season ===
Year	Team	GP	FG%	FT%	APG	PPG
1946–47	Toronto	53	.223	.439	.8	2.9
Career		53	.223	.439	.8	2.9
