= Mike McCarron =

American basketball player

Personal information
- Born: March 2, 1922 New York City, New York, U.S.
- Died: October 2, 1991 (aged 69)
- Listed height: 5 ft 11 in (1.80 m)
- Listed weight: 180 lb (82 kg)

Career information
- High school: Newtown (Queens, New York)
- College: Seton Hall (1942–1943)
- Playing career: 1944–1951
- Position: Guard
- Number: 14, 17

Career history
- 1944–1945: New York Gothams
- 1945–1946: Trenton Tigers
- 1946–1947: Toronto Huskies
- 1947: Atlanta Crackers
- 1947–1949: Trenton Tigers
- 1949: Baltimore Bullets
- 1949: St. Louis Bombers
- 1949–1950: Schenectady Packers
- 1950–1951: Bridgeport Roesslers
- 1951: Elmira Colonels
- Stats at NBA.com
- Stats at Basketball Reference

Michael Thomas McCarron (March 2, 1922 – October 2, 1991) was an American professional basketball player. Among other leagues and franchises, McCarron played for the Toronto Huskies, Baltimore Bullets, and St. Louis Bombers in the Basketball Association of America (BAA) and National Basketball Association (NBA) in the late 1940s.

== BAA/NBA career statistics ==
Legend
GP	Games played	FG%	Field-goal percentage
FT%	Free-throw percentage	APG	Assists per game
PPG	Points per game	**Bold**	Career high

=== Regular season ===
Year	Team	GP	FG%	FT%	APG	PPG
1946–47	Toronto	**60**	**.282**	.615	**1.0**	**10.8**
1949–50	Baltimore	3	.200	**.667**	.3	1.3
1949–50	St. Louis	5	.200	.500	.4	1.0
Career		68	.280	.614	.9	9.7
