= Gino Sovran =

Canadian basketball player (1924–2016)

Personal information
- Born: December 17, 1924 Windsor, Ontario, Canada
- Died: June 26, 2016 (aged 91) Royal Oak, Michigan, U.S.
- Listed height: 6 ft 2 in (1.88 m)
- Listed weight: 175 lb (79 kg)

Career information
- College: Assumption (1942–1945, 1946); Detroit Mercy (1945–1946)
- Playing career: 1946–1947
- Position: Forward / guard

Career history
- 1946: Toronto Huskies

Career NBA statistics
- Points: 11 (1.8 ppg)
- Assists: 1 (0.2 apg)
- Stats at NBA.com
- Stats at Basketball Reference

Gino Sovran (December 17, 1924 – June 26, 2016) was a Canadian professional basketball player.

Born in Windsor, Ontario, Sovran attended Kennedy Collegiate Institute and was a top basketball player at Assumption College, scoring more than 1,000 points over three seasons, and playing as team captain in the 1943–44 and 1944–45 seasons. He played for University of Detroit in 1945–46 where he was the team's leading scorer. Sovran then returned to the Assumption team to help it win the Ontario and Eastern Canada senior basketball championships in 1946 before losing to the Victoria Dominoes for the national title.

From there, Sovran joined the newly formed Toronto Huskies professional team that competed in the Basketball Association of America (which later evolved into the National Basketball Association). Along with former Assumption teammate Hank Biasatti, he was one of two Canadians to play for the Huskies in their first and only season in 1946–47. Sovran was signed by the Huskies about two weeks into the season, making his professional debut on November 22, 1946, against the Boston Celtics. He appeared in six games, before being waived by the team on December 29, 1946.

Sovran was also a competitive track and field athlete, setting regional records in the high jump and triple jump while a student.

He has been inducted into the University of Windsor Alumni Sports Hall of Fame in 1997 and the Canadian Basketball Hall of Fame 2002.

Away from sports, Sovran earned a doctoral degree from the University of Minnesota and worked as a research engineer for General Motors.

== BAA career statistics ==
Legend
GP	Games played
FG%	Field-goal percentage
FT%	Free-throw percentage
APG	Assists per game
PPG	Points per game

=== Regular season ===
Year	Team	GP	FG%	FT%	APG	PPG
1946–47	Toronto	6	.333	.500	.2	1.8
Career		6	.333	.500	.2	1.8
