= Dimock Township, Susquehanna County, Pennsylvania =

Township in Pennsylvania, United States

Dimock Township, Pennsylvania
- Township
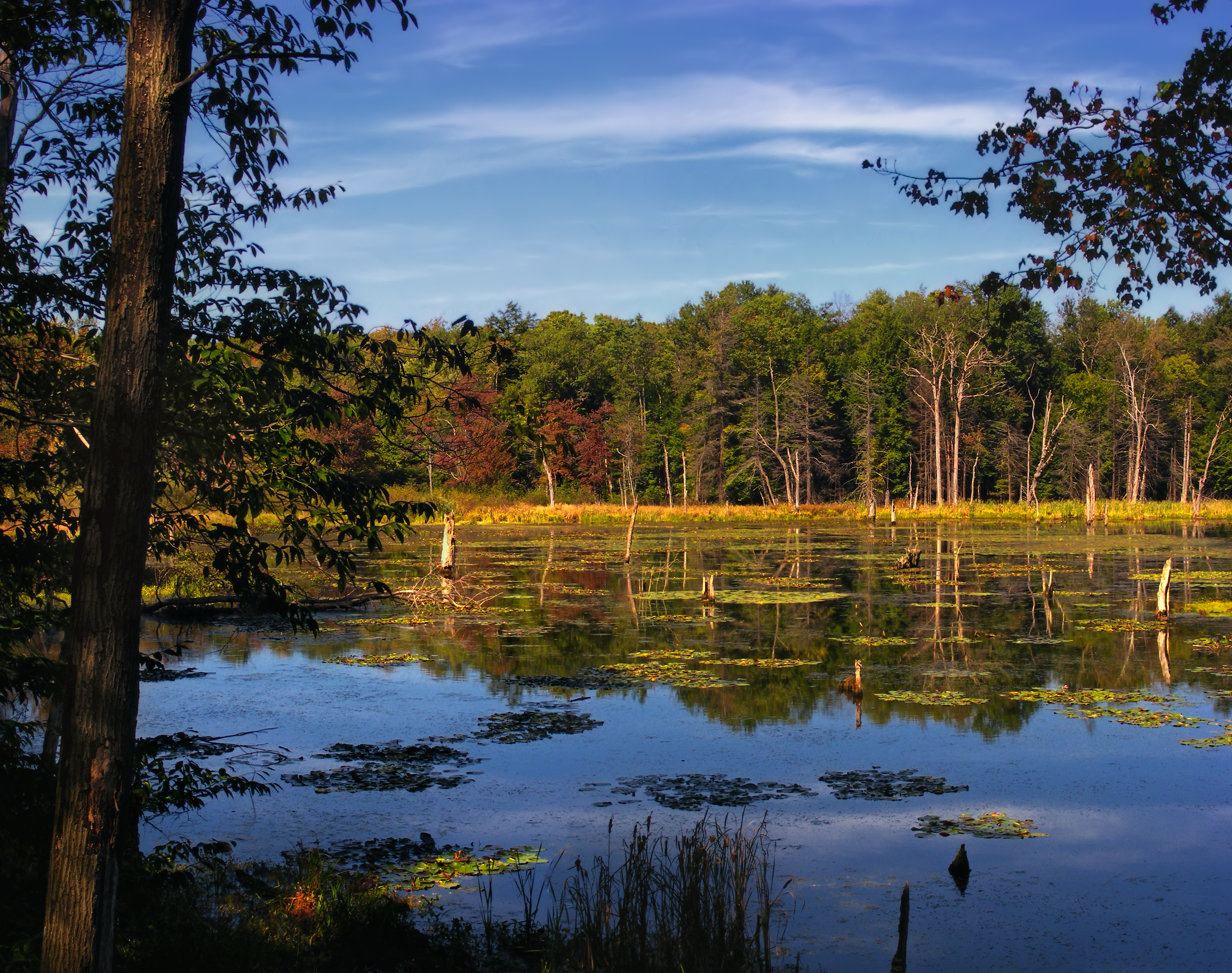
- Woodbourne Forest and Wildlife Preserve

- Location of Pennsylvania in the United States
- Coordinates: 41°44′00″N 75°54′59″W
- Country: United States
- State: Pennsylvania
- County: Susquehanna
- Settled: 1796
- Incorporated: 1832

Area
  - Total: 29.48 sq mi (76.36 km^{2})
  - Land: 29.03 sq mi (75.19 km^{2})
  - Water: 0.45 sq mi (1.16 km^{2})

Population (2020)
  - Total: 1,232 ▼
  - Estimate (2021): 1,230
  - Density: 48.8/sq mi (18.86/km^{2})
- Time zone: UTC-5 (EST)
  - Summer (DST): UTC-4 (EDT)
- ZIP Code: 18816
- Area code: 570
- FIPS code: 42-115-19264

Dimock Township is a township in Susquehanna County, Pennsylvania, United States. The population was 1,232 at the 2020 census. It is the home of former U.S. Congressman Chris Carney, a Democrat who represented Pennsylvania's 10th congressional district from 2007 to 2011. The school building for the Elk Lake School District is located near the village of Elk Lake in Dimock township.

Carter Road and State Route 3023 in Dimock Township, which sits above the Marcellus Shale, was the site of water contamination from hydraulic fracturing by Cabot Oil & Gas (later Coterra), and the subject of the documentary Gasland (2010).

== History ==
Named after Elder Davis Dimock, Dimock Township was formed from parts of Springville and Bridgewater Townships in December 1832.

== Geography ==
According to the United States Census Bureau, the township has a total area of 29.45 square miles (76.3 km^{2}), of which 29 square miles (75 km^{2}) is land and 0.45 square miles (1.2 km^{2}) (1.53%) is water.

== Demographics ==
Historical population
| Census | Pop. | Note | %± |
|---|---|---|---|
| 2010 | 1,497 | | — |
| 2020 | 1,232 | | −17.7% |
| 2021 (est.) | 1,230 | | −0.2% |
U.S. Decennial Census

As of the census of 2000, there were 1,497 people, 570 households, and 425 families residing in the township. The population density was 51.6 people per square mile (19.9 people/km^{2}). There were 723 housing units at an average density of 24.9 per square mile (9.6/km^{2}). The racial makeup of the township was 97.3% White, 0.1% African American, 0.05% American Indian, 0.05% Asian, 0.1% Pacific Islander, 1.3% from other races, and 1% from two or more races. Hispanic or Latino of any race were 2% of the population.

There were 570 households, out of which 33.9% had children under the age of 18 living with them, 60.2% were married couples living together, 8.4% had a female householder with no husband present, and 25.4% were non-families. 20.7% of all households were made up of individuals, and 9.2% had someone living alone who was 65 years of age or older. The average household size was 2.63 and the average family size was 3.00.

In the township the population was spread out, with 24.9% under the age of 18, 60.9% from 18 to 64, and 14.2% who were 65 years of age or older. The median age was 42.5 years.

The median income for a household in the township was $47,159, and the median income for a family was $55,139. Males had a median income of $40,924 versus $23,958 for females. The per capita income for the township was $22,648. About 7.3% of families and 8.7% of the population were below the poverty line, including 5.9% of those under age 18 and 12.2% of those age 65 or over.

== Water contamination incident ==
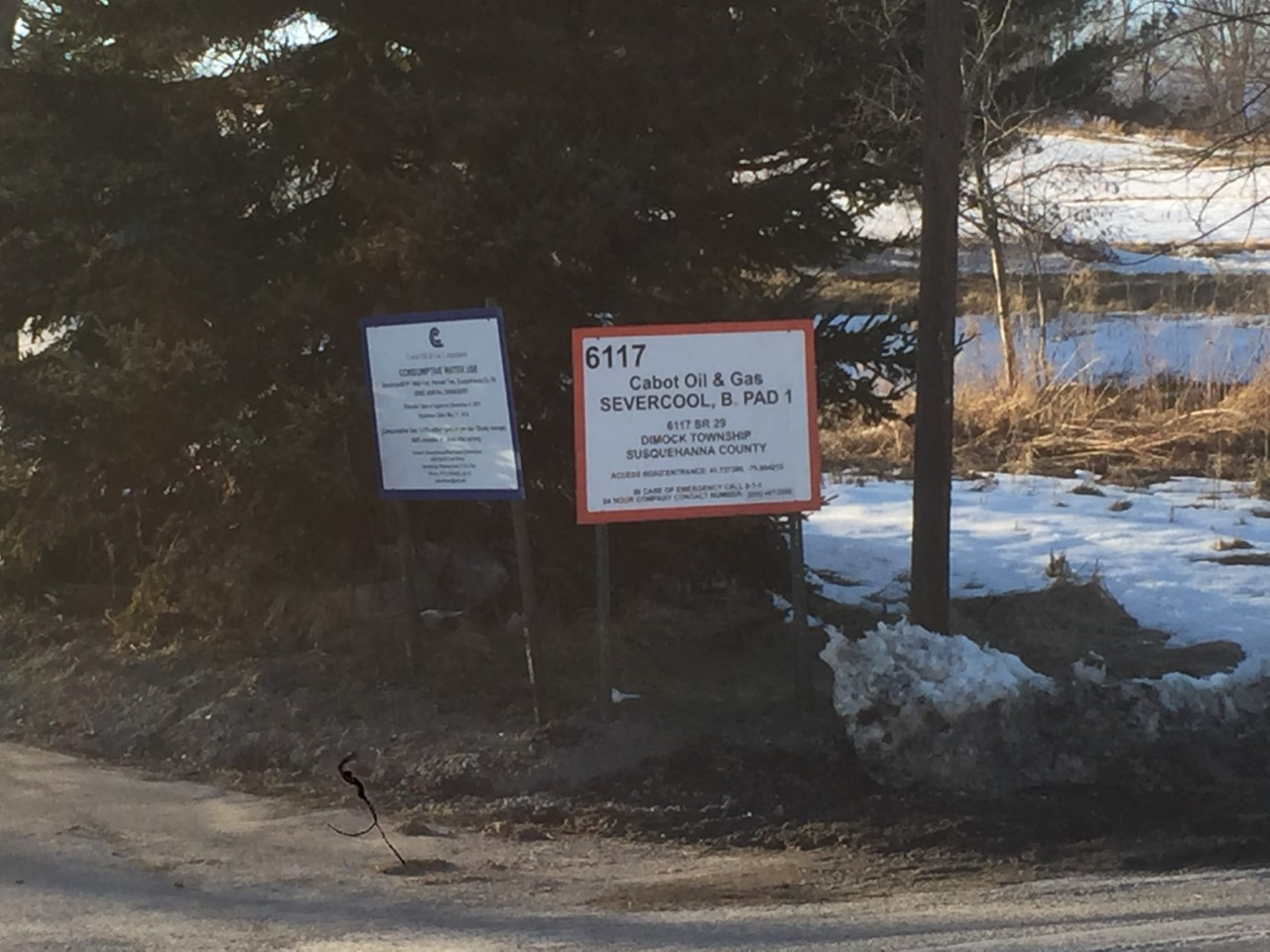
Fracking in Dimock

Carter Road and State Route 3023 in Dimock Township, which sits above the Marcellus Shale, was the site of water contamination from hydraulic fracturing by Cabot Oil & Gas (later Coterra), and the subject of the documentary Gasland (2010). In 2009, 13 water wells were contaminated with methane, and one exploded. Arsenic, barium, DEHP, glycol compounds, manganese, phenol, and sodium were found in unacceptable levels in the wells.

The company was required to financially compensate residents and provide alternative sources of water until mitigation systems were installed in affected wells. The company denied that hydraulic fracturing was involved.

In May 2012, after the installation of water treatment systems in affected homes, the United States Environmental Protection Agency reported that methane and arsenic were found only in one well. The company said that that the methane was preexisting.

In June 2020, the company was sued by Pennsylvania Attorney General Josh Shapiro.

In 2022, the company pleaded no contest for contaminating well water and agreed to pay $16.29 million to American Water Works to construct a new means of water supply to its residents and agreed to make 75 years of water bills payments for the impacted residents. As part of the settlement, the 12-year moratorium against fracking by the company was removed effective in October 2024 as politicians wanted to appeal to voters who are pro-fracking.
