= Eric Cradock =

Canadian businessman

Eric Cradock (died October 5, 1985) was a Canadian stockbroker and sports entrepreneur who played a key role in Canadian football development in the 1940s and 1950s. Toronto-born Cradock worked in mining and stocks, and was reputed to have become a millionaire in his early 20s.

Along with Lew Hayman and Léo Dandurand, Cradock co-founded the original Montreal Alouettes in 1946. The team quickly gained respectability, winning the Grey Cup in 1949. Cradock had a flair for showmanship and was successful in attracting paying customers.

Cradock sold his shares in the Alouettes for profit in 1952 and returned to Toronto. In the mid-1950s he angled to take control of Toronto Argonauts from the Argonaut Rowing Club. In 1956 he joined another ownership trio, this time with John Bassett and Charlie Burns, and became co-owner of the club. Cradock brought back old friend Hayman to run the club. He had sold out by 1960, apparently over differences with Bassett.

Football was not his only avenue of sports entrepreneurship. In 1946, while also founding the Alouettes, he was co-owner of the short-lived Toronto Huskies of the Basketball Association of America. The team folded after just one year.
