= Frank Fucarino =

American basketball player (1920–2012)

Personal information
- Born: July 24, 1920 Astoria, New York, U.S.
- Died: April 3, 2012 (aged 91)
- Listed height: 6 ft 2 in (1.88 m)
- Listed weight: 175 lb (79 kg)

Career information
- High school: Bryant (Astoria, New York)
- College: LIU Brooklyn (1940–1943)
- Playing career: 1946–1947
- Position: Forward
- Number: 12

Career history
- 1946–1947: Toronto Huskies
- Stats at NBA.com
- Stats at Basketball Reference

Frank A. Fucarino (July 24, 1920 – April 3, 2012) was an American professional basketball player for the Toronto Huskies. He played in the first ever NBA game.

== BAA career statistics ==
Legend
GP	Games played
FG%	Field-goal percentage
FT%	Free-throw percentage
APG	Assists per game
PPG	Points per game

=== Regular season ===
Year	Team	GP	FG%	FT%	APG	PPG
1946–47	Toronto	28	.268	.567	.3	5.0
Career		28	.268	.567	.3	5.0
