= Cimarex Energy =

American energy company

Cimarex Energy Co.
- Traded as: NYSE: XEC
- Industry: Petroleum industry
- Founded: 2002; 24 years ago
- Defunct: October 1, 2021; 4 years ago
- Fate: Acquired by Coterra
- Headquarters: Denver, Colorado, U.S.
- Key people: Thomas E. Jorden, Chairman & CEO; G. Mark Burford, CFO
- Production output: 252.5 thousand barrels of oil equivalent (1,545,000 GJ) per day
- Revenue: ▼US$1.558 billion (2020)
- Net income: ▼ -US$1.967 billion (2020)
- Total assets: ▼US$4.621 billion (2020)
- Total equity: ▼US$1.553 billion (2020)
- Number of employees: 747 (2020)

Cimarex Energy Co. was a company engaged in hydrocarbon exploration, particularly shale oil and gas drilling. It was organized in Delaware and headquartered in Denver, Colorado, with operations primarily in Texas, Oklahoma, and New Mexico.

As of December 31, 2020, the company had 531 million barrels of oil equivalent (3.25×10^{9} GJ) of estimated proved reserves, of which 43% was natural gas, 27% was petroleum, and 30% was natural gas liquids.

In 2020, production averaged 252.5 thousand barrels of oil equivalent (1,545,000 GJ) per day, 69% of which came from the Permian Basin and 31% of which came from the Mid-Continent oil province, particularly the Cana–Woodford in western Oklahoma.

== History ==
Cimarex was founded in 2002. The company was a corporate spin-off of Helmerich & Payne, which sought to separate its exploration and production business from its drilling business. In September 2002, shareholders of Helmerich & Payne received shares in Cimarex.

In 2005, the company acquired Magnum Hunter Resources in a $2.1 billion transaction.

In 2008, the company bought 38,000 acres in Oklahoma from Chesapeake Energy for $180 million.

In 2012, the company sold assets in Texas for $294 million.

In 2014, Cimarex acquired assets in the Cana-Woodford, including 140 billion cubic feet equivalent of proved reserves and 50,000 net acres, in a $249 million transaction.

In 2018, the company sold assets in Ward County, Texas for $570 million.

In March 2019, the company acquired Resolute Energy for $1.6 billion.

In October 2021, the company was acquired by Cabot Oil & Gas, forming Coterra.
