= Dick Fitzgerald (basketball) =

American basketball player

Personal information
- Born: November 18, 1920 Queens, New York, U.S.
- Died: March 13, 1968 (aged 47)
- Listed height: 6 ft 2 in (1.88 m)
- Listed weight: 175 lb (79 kg)

Career information
- High school: Newtown (Queens, New York)
- College: Fordham (1940–1942)
- Playing career: 1946–1947
- Position: Forward
- Number: 10, 16

Career history
- 1946–1947: Toronto Huskies
- 1947: Providence Steamrollers
- Stats at NBA.com
- Stats at Basketball Reference

Richard Fitzgerald (November 18, 1920 – April 13, 1968) was an American professional basketball player.

A 6'2" forward from Fordham University, Fitzgerald played parts of two seasons (1946–47; 1947–48) in the Basketball Association of America as a member of the Toronto Huskies and Providence Steamrollers. He averaged 4.5 points in 61 games. He also served as interim player-coach of the Huskies for three games in his first season, after the team's previous player-coach, Ed Sadowski, expressed dissatisfaction with his role on the team. Fitzgerald posted a 2–1 record. After the Huskies dispersed at the end of the 1946–47 season, Fitzgerald was selected by the Providence Steamrollers in the dispersal draft, but only played one game with the team.

Fitzgerald's brother, Bob, also played in the BAA, and the two were teammates on the Huskies, before Bob was traded to the New York Knicks midseason.

== BAA career statistics ==
Legend
GP	Games played	FG%	Field-goal percentage
FT%	Free-throw percentage	APG	Assists per game
PPG	Points per game	**Bold**	Career high

=== Regular season ===
Year	Team	GP	FG%	FT%	APG	PPG
1946–47	Toronto	**60**	**.238**	**.683**	**.7**	**4.6**
1947–48	Providence	1	.000	.000	.0	.0
Career		61	.237	.683	.7	4.5

== Head coaching record ==
Legend
Regular season	G	Games coached	W	Games won	L	Games lost	W–L %	Win–loss %
Playoffs	PG	Playoff games	PW	Playoff wins	PL	Playoff losses	PW–L %	Playoff win–loss %

Team	Year	G	W	L	W–L%	Finish	PG	PW	PL	PW–L%	Result
Toronto	1946–47	3	2	1	.667	(interim)	—	—	—	—	—
