= Charlie Hoefer =

Professional basketball player (1921–1983)

Personal information
- Born: September 16, 1921 Frankfurt, Weimar Republic (now Germany)
- Died: June 12, 1983 (aged 61) Sioux Falls, South Dakota, U.S.
- Listed height: 5 ft 9 in (1.75 m)
- Listed weight: 185 lb (84 kg)

Career information
- High school: Newtown (Queens, New York)
- College: Queens (1939–1941)
- Playing career: 1941–1950
- Position: Point guard
- Number: 13, 3

Career history
- 1941–1942: Wilmington Bombers
- 1942–1943: Camden / Brooklyn Indians
- 1943–1944: Wilmington Bombers
- 1945–1946: Wilmington Bombers
- 1946–1947: Toronto Huskies
- 1947: Boston Celtics
- 1947–1948: Saratoga Indians
- 1948–1949: Trenton Tigers
- Stats at NBA.com
- Stats at Basketball Reference

Adolph Charles "Dutch" Hoefer (September 16, 1921 – June 12, 1983) was a professional basketball player. He was a point guard, and spent two seasons in the Basketball Association of America (BAA), starting as a member of the Toronto Huskies in 1946 before being traded to the Boston Celtics on January 2, 1947, for Red Wallace. He attended Queens College and spent most of his professional career in the American Basketball League, mainly with the Wilmington Bombers.

Hoefer was born in Germany but moved to the United States with his family in 1926. He became a naturalized citizen and served in the United States Coast Guard during World War II. He died in June 1983 at the age of 61.

== BAA career statistics ==
Legend
GP	Games played	FG%	Field-goal percentage
FT%	Free-throw percentage	APG	Assists per game
PPG	Points per game	**Bold**	Career high

=== Regular season ===
Year	Team	GP	FG%	FT%	APG	PPG
1946–47	Toronto	23	**.273**	**.696**	.4	**6.1**
1946–47	Boston	**35**	.241	.634	**.7**	6.0
1947–48	Boston	7	.158	.500	.4	1.4
Career		65	.250	.646	.6	5.6
