= Elk Lake School District =

School district in Pennsylvania

Coordinates: 41.73442°N 76.03775°W

Address
- 2380 Elk Lake School Road, Springville Dimock Township, Pennsylvania Susquehanna County, Wyoming County, Pennsylvania, 18844; United States

District information
- Type: Public school district
- Established: 1957

Other information
- Website: elklakeschool.org

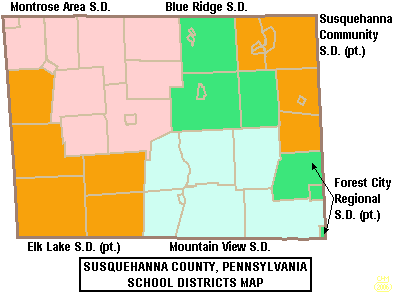
Map of Susquehanna County, Pennsylvania School Districts

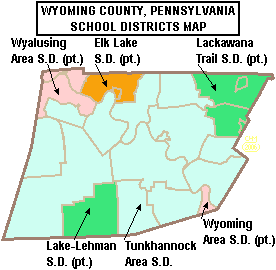
Map of Wyoming County, Pennsylvania School Districts

Elk Lake School District is a small, rural, K-12 public school district with its only building located on State Route 3019 in Dimock, Susquehanna County, Pennsylvania. (Since the end of rural delivery from the Dimock post office, the school district has had a mailing address of nearby Springville.) It covers Auburn Township, Middletown Township, Rush Township, Dimock Township, and Springville Township in Susquehanna County, along with Meshoppen Borough and Meshoppen Township in Wyoming County. The Elk Lake School District encompasses approximately 197 square miles (510 km^{2}). According to 2000 federal census data, Elk Lake School District serves a resident population of 7,735 people. In 2009, the district residents’ per capita income was $15,355, while the median family income was $38,385. In the Commonwealth, the median family income was $49,501 and the United States median family income was $49,445, in 2010. In 2006, the district students are 97% white, less than 1% Asian, less than 1% black and 2% Hispanic.

Elk Lake School District operates two schools: an elementary school and a junior senior high school. They are both in one building, connected by an aquatic center used by both. The district also offers a taxpayer funded Head Start program for preschoolers.

== History ==
The Elk Lake School District was founded in 1957 as a joint school district, replacing the six main districts and "one room schoolhouses" in the district's seven civil subdivisions (six townships and one borough) in Susquehanna and Wyoming County. The schools had been located in Auburn Township, Dimock Township, Middletown Township, Rush Township, Springville Township and Meshoppen (one school served Meshoppen Borough and Meshoppen Township). The school was legally reorganized on July 1, 1966, as a single fourth-class school district.

== Activities ==
The Elk Lake School District offers a variety of clubs, activities and an extensive sports program. Activities at the school include: Ski Club, Key Club, Future Business Leaders of America, Jazz Band, Concert Band, Chorus, Aevidum, Starry Knights, Scholastic Bowl, DARE, and Theater and Drama.

=== Sports ===
The district funds:

Boys

- Baseball - AA Varsity and JV
- Basketball- AA Varsity and JV
- Cross Country - A Varsity and JV
- Golf - AA
- Soccer - A Varsity and JV
- Swimming and Diving - AA Varsity and JV
- Track and Field - AA Varsity and JV
- Volleyball - AA Varsity and JV
- Wrestling - AA Varsity and JV

Girls

- Basketball - AA Varsity and JV
- Cheerleading - Basketball Varsity and JV
- Cross Country - A Varsity and JV
- Soccer (Fall) - A Varsity and JV
- Softball - AA Varsity and JV
- Swimming and Diving - AA Varsity and JV
- Girls' Tennis - AA
- Track and Field - AA Varsity and JV
- Volleyball - Varsity and JV

Junior High School Sports

Boys

- Baseball
- Basketball
- Cross Country
- Soccer
- Swimming and Diving
- Track and Field
- Wrestling

Girls

- Basketball
- Cross Country
- Softball
- Swimming and Diving
- Track and Field

According to PIAA directory July 2012

The varsity boys' basketball team won two PIAA State Championships, in 1969 and 1977, the latter team going undefeated with a state record of 36 wins.

In 2008, the varsity boys Cross Country team won the PIAA AA State Championship. In 2010, both the boys and girls varsity cross country teams placed second (both to Holy Redeemer) at the PIAA District II meet. One of the top runners on the boys team was injured prior to the district meet. Just two weeks after the District II meet, both teams placed first in the state meet, a feat which has only been accomplished by one other team.

In 2009, Elk lake also sent their wrestling team led by Anthony Juser, Derek Green, Brent Salsman, Josh Ralston, Keaton Bennet and Devon Maye to states after they upset Lake-Lehman 35-33.

Community swimming - Elk Lake High School also offers open swim on Tuesday and Wednesday nights from 6:30 P.M. until 8:30 P.M.
