= Bob Fitzgerald (basketball) =

American basketball player

Personal information
- Born: March 14, 1923 Queens, New York, U.S.
- Died: July 23, 1983 (aged 60)
- Listed height: 6 ft 5 in (1.96 m)
- Listed weight: 190 lb (86 kg)

Career information
- High school: Newtown (Elmhurst, New York)
- College: Seton Hall (1941–1943)
- Playing career: 1945–1949
- Position: Forward / center
- Number: 10, 11, 12

Career history
- 1945–1946: Rochester Royals
- 1946–1947: Toronto Huskies
- 1947: New York Knicks
- 1947–1948: Syracuse Nationals
- 1948–1949: Rochester Royals

Career highlights
- NBL champion (1946)
- Stats at NBA.com
- Stats at Basketball Reference

Robert Fitzgerald (March 14, 1923 – July 23, 1983) was an American professional basketball player.

A 6 feet 5 inches (1.96 m) center/forward from Seton Hall University, Fitzgerald played two seasons in the Basketball Association of America as a member of the Toronto Huskies, New York Knicks, and Rochester Royals. He was traded on January 21, 1947, by the Toronto Huskies to the New York Knicks for Bob Mullens. He averaged 3.1 points per game in his BAA career.

Fitzgerald also played in the National Basketball League with the Rochester Royals and Syracuse Nationals.

Fitzgerald served in the military during World War II. His brother, Dick Fitzgerald, also played in the BAA, and the two were teammates while on the Toronto Huskies.

== BAA career statistics ==
Legend
GP	Games played	FG%	Field-goal percentage
FT%	Free-throw percentage	APG	Assists per game
PPG	Points per game	**Bold**	Career high

=== Regular season ===
Year	Team	GP	FG%	FT%	APG	PPG
1946–47	Toronto	**31**	.195	.643	**.8**	**4.5**
1946–47	New York	29	.190	.600	.3	2.8
1948–49	Rochester	18	**.207**	**.700**	.7	1.1
Career		78	.194	.629	.6	3.1

=== Playoffs ===
Year	Team	GP	FG%	FT%	APG	PPG
1946–47	New York	**5**	**.111**	**.750**	**.2**	**1.0**
1948–49	Rochester	1	.000	.000	.0	.0
Career		6	.100	.750	.2	.8
