= Wimpy Quinn =

American baseball player (1918–1954)

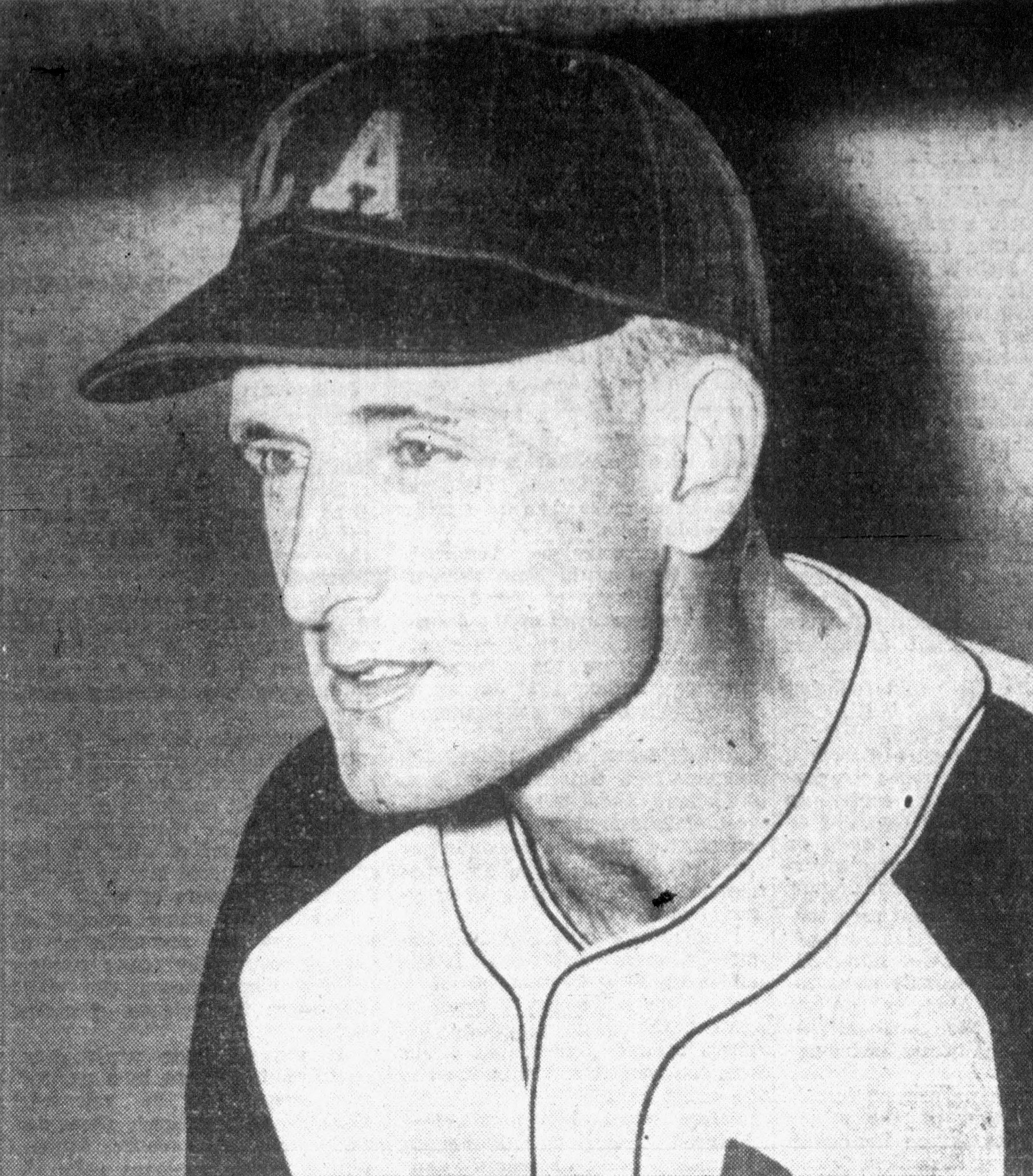
- Quinn, circa 1943
- Pitcher
- Born: May 14, 1918; Birmingham, Alabama, U.S.
- Died: September 1, 1954 (aged 36); Santa Monica, California, U.S.
- Batted: Right Threw: Right

MLB debut
- June 8, 1941, for the Chicago Cubs

Last MLB appearance
- September 25, 1941, for the Chicago Cubs

MLB statistics
- Win–loss record: 0–0
- Earned run average: 7.20
- Strikeouts: 2
- Stats at Baseball Reference

Teams
- Chicago Cubs (1941)

Wellington Hunt "Wimpy" Quinn (May 14, 1918 – September 1, 1954) was an American Major League Baseball pitcher who pitched in three games for the Chicago Cubs in 1941. He threw five innings, all in relief.

Quinn played thirteen seasons in the minor leagues, mainly playing first base, but never played that position in the majors. In 1951, his final professional season, he served as player-manager of the Bakersfield Indians.

Quinn died on September 1, 1954. He was interred at Woodlawn Memorial Cemetery in Santa Monica.
