= List of S&P 600 companies =

The S&P SmallCap 600 (S&P 600) stock market index, maintained by S&P Dow Jones Indices, comprises the common stocks of 600 small-cap, mostly American, companies. Although called the "S&P 600", the index contains 603 stocks because it includes two share classes of stock from three of its component companies (Central Garden & Pet Company, Clearway Energy and Under Armour).

Stocks here are cross referenced with the following index funds to compose the list:

- Vanguard S&P Small-Cap 600 ETF (NYSE Arca: VIOO)
- SPDR Portfolio S&P 600 Small Cap ETF (NYSE Arca: SPSM)
- iShares Core S&P Small-Cap ETF (NYSE Arca: IJR)

These index funds may be reconstituted at different intervals resulting in a small difference in holdings.

== S&P 600 component stocks ==
The companies listed here are sorted alphabetically by ticker symbol by default.

Symbol	Security	GICS Sector	GICS Sub-Industry	Headquarters Location	SEC filings	CIK
AAMI	Acadian Asset Management Inc.	Financials	Asset Management & Custody Banks	Boston, Massachusetts	view	0001748824
AAP	Advance Auto Parts, Inc.	Consumer Discretionary	Automotive Retail	Raleigh, North Carolina	view	0001158449
AAT	American Assets Trust	Real Estate	Diversified REITs	San Diego, California	view	0001500217
ABCB	Ameris Bancorp	Financials	Regional Banks	Atlanta, Georgia	view	0000351569
ABG	Asbury Automotive Group	Consumer Discretionary	Automotive Retail	Duluth, Georgia	view	0001144980
ABM	ABM Industries, Inc.	Industrials	Environmental & Facilities Services	New York City, New York	view	0000771497
ABR	Arbor Realty Trust	Financials	Mortgage REITs	Uniondale, New York	view	0001253986
ACA	Arcosa, Inc.	Industrials	Construction & Engineering	Dallas, Texas	view	0001739445
ACAD	Acadia Pharmaceuticals	Health Care	Pharmaceuticals	San Diego, California	view	0001070494
ACHC	Acadia Healthcare	Health Care	Health Care Facilities	Franklin, Tennessee	view	0001520697
ACIW	ACI Worldwide	Information Technology	Application Software	Miami, Florida	view	0000935036
ACLS	Axcelis Technologies, Inc.	Information Technology	Semiconductor Materials & Equipment	Beverly, Massachusetts	view	0001113232
ACMR	ACM Research, Inc.	Information Technology	Semiconductor Materials & Equipment	Fremont, California	view	0001680062
ACT	Enact Holdings, Inc.	Financials	Commercial & Residential Mortgage Finance	Raleigh, North Carolina	view	0001823529
ADAM	Adamas Trust, Inc.	Real Estate	Mortgage REITs	New York City, New York	view	0001273685
ADEA	Adeia, Inc.	Information Technology	IT Consulting & Other Services	San Jose, California	view	0001803696
ADIG	ADI Global Distribution	Information Technology	Electronic Equipment & Instruments	Melville, New York	view	0002105139
ADMA	ADMA Biologics, Inc.	Health Care	Biotechnology	Ramsey, New Jersey	view	0001368514
ADNT	Adient	Consumer Discretionary	Automotive Parts & Equipment	Plymouth, Michigan	view	0001670541
ADT	ADT Inc.	Consumer Discretionary	Specialized Consumer Services	Boca Raton, Florida	view	0001703056
ADUS	Addus HomeCare Corp.	Health Care	Health Care Services	Frisco, Texas	view	0001468328
AEO	American Eagle Outfitters	Consumer Discretionary	Apparel Retail	Pittsburgh, Pennsylvania	view	0000919012
AESI	Atlas Energy Solutions, Inc.	Energy	Oil & Gas Equipment & Services	Austin, Texas	view	0001984060
AGNT	eXp World Holdings, Inc.	Real Estate	Real Estate Services	Bellingham, Washington	view	0001495932
AGO	Assured Guaranty Ltd.	Financials	Property & Casualty Insurance	Hamilton, Bermuda	view	0001273813
AGX	Argan, Inc.	Industrials	Construction & Engineering	Arlington County, Virginia	view	0000100591
AGYS	Agilysys, Inc.	Information Technology	Application Software	Alpharetta, Georgia	view	0000078749
AHCO	AdaptHealth Corp.	Health Care	Health Care Equipment	Plymouth Meeting, Pennsylvania	view	0001725255
AIN	Albany International Corp.	Industrials	Industrial Machinery & Supplies & Components	Rochester, New Hampshire	view	0000819793
AIR	AAR Corp.	Industrials	Aerospace & Defense	Wood Dale, Illinois	view	0000001750
AKR	Acadia Realty Trust	Real Estate	Retail REITs	Rye, New York	view	0000899629
ALG	Alamo Group	Industrials	Construction Machinery & Heavy Transportation Equipment	Seguin, Texas	view	0000897077
ALGT	Allegiant Travel Company	Industrials	Passenger Airlines	Summerlin, Nevada	view	0001362468
ALHC	Alignment Healthcare, Inc.	Health Care	Health Care Services	Orange, California	view	0001832466
ALKS	Alkermes plc	Health Care	Pharmaceuticals	Dublin, Ireland	view	0001520262
ALRM	Alarm.Com, Inc.	Financials	Application Software	Tysons, Virginia	view	0001459200
AMN	Amn Healthcare Services, Inc.	Health Care	Health Care Services	Dallas, Texas	view	0001142750
AMPH	Amphstar Pharmaceuticals, Inc.	Health Care	Pharmaceuticals	Rancho Cucamonga, California	view	0001297184
AMR	Alpha Metallurgical Resources, Inc.	Materials	Steel	Bristol, Tennessee	view	0001704715
AMRX	Amneal Pharmaceuticals	Health Care	Pharmaceuticals	Bridgewater Township, New Jersey	view	0001723128
AMSF	Amerisafe, Inc.	Financials	Property & Casualty Insurance	DeRidder, Louisiana	view	0001018979
AMTM	Amentum	Industrials	Diversified Support Services	Chantilly, Virginia	view	0002011286
ANDE	The Andersons, Inc.	Consumer Staples	Food Distributors	Maumee, Ohio	view	0000821026
ANIP	ANI Pharmaceuticals, Inc.	Health Care	Pharmaceuticals	Baudette, Minnesota	view	0001023024
AORT	Artivion	Health Care	Health Care Equipment	Kennesaw, Georgia	view	0000784199
AOSL	Alpha and Omega Semiconductor, Ltd.	Information Technology	Semiconductors	Sunnyvale, California	view	0001387467
APAM	Artisan Partners Asset Management, Inc.	Financials	Asset Management & Custody Banks	Milwaukee, Wisconsin	view	0001517302
APLE	Apple Hospitality REIT, Inc.	Real Estate	Hotel & Resort REITs	Richmond, Virginia	view	0001418121
APOG	Apogee Enterprises, Inc.	Industrials	Building Products	Minneapolis, Minnesota	view	0000006845
ARCB	ArcBest Corp.	Industrials	Cargo Ground Transportation	Fort Smith, Arkansas	view	0000894405
ARLO	Arlo Technologies	Information Technology	Communications Equipment	San Jose, California	view	0001736946
AROC	Archrock, Inc.	Energy	Oil & Gas Equipment & Services	Houston, Texas	view	0001389050
ARR	Armour Residential REIT	Real Estate	Mortgage REITs	Vero Beach, Florida	view	0001428205
ASO	Academy Sports + Outdoors	Consumer Discretionary	Other Specialty Retail	Harris County, Texas	view	0001817358
ASTE	Astec Industries, Inc.	Industrials	Construction Machinery & Heavy Transportation Equipment	Chattanooga, Tennessee	view	0000792987
ASTH	Astrana Health, Inc.	Health Care	Health Care Facilities	Alhambra, California	view	0001083446
ATEN	A10 Networks, Inc.	Information Technology	Systems Software	San Jose, California	view	0001580808
ATMU	Atmus Filtration Technologies Inc.	Industrials	Industrial Machinery & Supplies & Components	Nashville, Tennessee	view	0001921963
AUB	Atlantic Union Bankshares, Corp.	Financials	Regional Banks	Richmond, Virginia	view	0000883948
AVA	Avista Corporation	Utilities	Multi-Utilities	Spokane, Washington	view	0000104918
AWI	Armstrong World Industries, Inc.	Industrials	Building Products	Lancaster, Pennsylvania	view	0000007431
AWR	American States Water Company	Utilities	Water Utilities	San Dimas, California	view	0001056903
AX	Axos Financial, Inc.	Financials	Regional Banks	Las Vegas, Nevada	view	0001299709
AZTA	Azenta, Inc.	Health Care	Life Sciences Tools & Services	Chelmsford, Massachusetts	view	0000933974
AZZ	AZZ, Inc.	Industrials	Heavy Electrical Equipment	Fort Worth, Texas	view	0000008947
BANC	Banc Of California, Inc.	Financials	Regional Banks	Santa Ana, California	view	0001169770
BANF	Bancfirst Corp	Financials	Regional Banks	Oklahoma City, Oklahoma	view	0000760498
BANR	Banner Corporation	Financials	Regional Banks	Walla Walla, Washington	view	0000946673
BBT	Beacon Financial Corp.	Financials	Regional Banks	Boston, Massachusetts	view	0001108134
BCC	Boise Cascade	Industrials	Building Products	Boise, Idaho	view	0001328581
BCPC	Balchem Corporation	Materials	Specialty Chemicals	Montvale, New Jersey	view	0000009326
BFAM	Bright Horizons Family Solutions Inc.	Consumer Discretionary	Specialized Consumer Services	Newton, Massachusetts	view	0001437578
BFH	Bread Financial Holdings, Inc.	Financials	Consumer Finance	Columbus, Ohio	view	0001101215
BFS	Saul Centers, Inc.	Real Estate	Retail REITs	Bethesda, Maryland	view	0000907254
BGC	BGC Group, Inc.	Financials	Investment Banking & Brokerage	New York City, New York	view	0001094831
BHE	Benchmark Electronics, Inc.	Information Technology	Electronic Manufacturing Services	Tempe, Arizona	view	0000863436
BJRI	BJ's Restaurants, Inc.	Consumer Discretionary	Restaurants	Huntington Beach, California	view	0001013488
BKE	The Buckle, Inc.	Consumer Discretionary	Apparel Retail	Kearney, Nebraska	view	0000885245
BKU	BankUnited, Inc.	Financials	Regional Banks	Miami Lakes, Florida	view	0001504008
BL	BlackLine Systems, Inc.	Information Technology	Application Software	Los Angeles, California	view	0001666134
BLFS	BioLife Solutions, Inc.	Health Care	Health Care Supplies	Bothell, Washington	view	0000834365
BLKB	Blackbaud	Information Technology	Application Software	Charleston, South Carolina	view	0001280058
BMI	Badger Meter, Inc.	Information Technology	Electronic Equipment & Instruments	Milwaukee, Wisconsin	view	0000009092
BNL	Broadstone Net Lease, Inc.	Real Estate	Industrial REITs	Victor, New York	view	0001424182
BOH	Bank of Hawaii	Financials	Regional Banks	Honolulu, Hawaii	view	0000046195
BOOT	Boot Barn Holdings, Inc.	Consumer Discretionary	Apparel Retail	Irvine, California	view	0001610250
BOX	Box, Inc.	Information Technology	Application Software	Redwood City, California	view	0001372612
BRC	Brady Corporation	Industrials	Commercial Printing	Milwaukee, Wisconsin	view	0000746598
BTU	Peabody Energy, Inc.	Energy	Coal & Consumable Fuels	St. Louis, Missouri	view	0001064728
BXMT	Blackstone Mortgage Trust, Inc.	Financials	Mortgage REITs	New York City, New York	view	0001061630
CACC	Credit Acceptance	Financials	Specialized Finance	Southfield, Michigan	view	0000885550
CAG	Conagra Brands	Consumer Staples	Packaged Foods & Meats	Chicago, Illinois	view	0000023217
CAKE	The Cheesecake Factory, Inc.	Consumer Discretionary	Restaurants	Calabasas, California	view	0000887596
CALM	Cal-Maine Foods, Inc.	Consumer Staples	Packaged Foods & Meats	Jackson, Mississippi	view	0000016160
CALX	Calix	Information Technology	Application Software	San Jose, California	view	0001406666
CALY	Callaway Golf Company	Consumer Discretionary	Leisure Products	Carlsbad, California	view	0000837465
CARG	CarGurus	Communication Services	Interactive Media & Services	Cambridge, Massachusetts	view	0001494259
CASH	Pathward Financial, Inc.	Financials	Regional Banks	Sioux Falls, South Dakota	view	0000907471
CATY	Cathay General Bancorp	Financials	Regional Banks	Los Angeles, California	view	0000861842
CBRL	Cracker Barrel	Consumer Discretionary	Restaurants	Lebanon, Tennessee	view	0001067294
CBU	Community Bank System, Inc.	Financials	Regional Banks	DeWitt, New York	view	0000723188
CC	Chemours	Materials	Diversified Chemicals	Wilmington, Delaware	view	0001627223
CCOI	Cogent Communications Holdings, Inc.	Communication Services	Alternative Carriers	Washington, D.C.	view	0001158324
CCS	Century Communities, Inc.	Consumer Discretionary	Homebuilding	Greenwood Village, Colorado	view	0001576940
CE	Celanese	Materials	Specialty Chemicals	Irving, Texas	view	0001306830
CENT	Central Garden & Pet Company	Consumer Staples	Household Products	Walnut Creek, California	view	0000887733
CENTA	Central Garden & Pet Company (Class A)	Consumer Staples	Household Products	Walnut Creek, California	view	0000887733
CENX	Century Aluminum Company	Materials	Aluminum	Chicago, Illinois	view	0000949157
CERT	Certara, Inc.	Health Care	Health Care Technology	Princeton, New Jersey	view	0001827090
CFFN	Capitol Federal Savings Bank	Financials	Regional Banks	Topeka, Kansas	view	0001490906
CHCO	City Holding Company	Financials	Regional Banks	Charleston, West Virginia	view	0000726854
CHEF	Chefs' Warehouse, Inc.	Consumer Staples	Food Distributors	Ridgefield, Connecticut	view	0001517175
CLSK	CleanSpark, Inc.	Information Technology	Internet Services & Infrastructure	Henderson, Nevada	view	0000827876
CNK	Cinemark Holdings, Inc.	Communication Services	Movies & Entertainment	Plano, Texas	view	0001385280
CNMD	CONMED Corporation	Health Care	Health Care Equipment	Largo, Florida	view	0000816956
CNR	Core Natural Resources, Inc.	Energy	Coal & Consumable Fuels	Cecil Township, Pennsylvania	view	0001710366
CNS	Cohen & Steers, Inc.	Financials	Asset Management & Custody Banks	New York City, New York	view	0001284812
CNXC	Concentrix	Industrials	Data Processing & Outsourced Services	Newark, California	view	0001803599
CNXN	PC Connection, Inc.	Information Technology	Technology Distributors	Merrimack, New Hampshire	view	0001050377
COCO	The Vita Coco Company	Consumer Staples	Soft Drinks & Non-alcoholic Beverages	New York City, New York	view	0001482981
COHU	Cohu, Inc.	Information Technology	Semiconductor Materials & Equipment	Poway, California	view	0000021535
COLL	Collegium Pharmaceutical, Inc.	Health Care	Pharmaceuticals	Stoughton, Massachusetts	view	0001267565
CON	Concentra Group Holdings Parent, Inc.	Health Care	Health Care Services	Mechanicsburg, Pennsylvania	view	0002014596
CORT	Corcept Therapeutics Incorporated	Health Care	Pharmaceuticals	Menlo Park, California	view	0001088856
COTY	Coty	Consumer Staples	Personal Care Products	New York City, New York	view	0001024305
CPB	The Campbell's Company	Consumer Staples	Packaged Foods & Meats	Camden, New Jersey	view	0000016732
CPF	Central Pacific Financial Corp.	Financials	Regional Banks	Honolulu, Hawaii	view	0000701347
CPK	Chesapeake Utilities Corp.	Utilities	Gas Utilities	Dover, Delaware	view	0000019745
CRC	California Resources Corporation	Energy	Oil & Gas Exploration & Production	Los Angeles, California	view	0001609253
CRGY	Crescent Energy Company	Energy	Oil & Gas Exploration & Production	Houston, Texas	view	0001866175
CRI	Carter's, Inc.	Consumer Discretionary	Apparel, Accessories & Luxury Goods	Atlanta, Georgia	view	0001060822
CRK	Comstock Resources, Inc.	Energy	Oil & Gas Exploration & Production	Frisco, Texas	view	0000023194
CRSR	Corsair Gaming	Information Technology	Technology Hardware, Storage & Peripherals	Milpitas, California	view	0001743759
CRVL	CorVel Corporation	Health Care	Health Care Services	Irvine, California	view	0000874866
CSR	Centerspace Trust	Real Estate	Multi-Family Residential REITs	Minot, North Dakota	view	0000798359
CSW	CSW Industrials, Inc.	Industrials	Industrial Conglomerates	Dallas, Texas	view	0001624794
CTS	CTS Corporation	Information Technology	Electronic Manufacturing Services	Lisle, Illinois	view	0000026058
CUBI	Customers Bancorp, Inc.	Financials	Regional Banks	Reading, Pennsylvania	view	0001488813
CURB	Curbline Properties Corp.	Real Estate	Retail REITs	New York City, New York	view	0002027317
CVBF	CVB Financial Corp.	Financials	Regional Banks	Ontario, California	view	0000354647
CVCO	Cavco Industries, Inc.	Consumer Discretionary	Homebuilding	Phoenix, Arizona	view	0000278166
CVI	CVR Energy, Inc.	Energy	Oil & Gas Refining & Marketing	Sugar Land, Texas	view	0001376139
CVSA	Covista Inc.	Consumer Discretionary	Education Services	Chicago, Illinois	view	0000730464
CWEN	Clearway Energy, Inc. (Class C)	Utilities	Renewable Electricity	Princeton, New Jersey	view	0001567683
CWEN.A	Clearway Energy, Inc. (Class A)	Utilities	Renewable Electricity	Princeton, New Jersey	view	0001567683
CWK	Cushman & Wakefield plc	Real Estate	Real Estate Services	Chicago, Illinois	view	0001628369
CWST	Casella Waste Systems, Inc.	Industrials	Environmental & Facilities Services	Rutland, Vermont	view	0000911177
CWT	California Water Service Group	Utilities	Water Utilities	San Jose, California	view	0001035201
CXM	Sprinklr, Inc.	Information Technology	Application Software	New York City, New York	view	0001569345
CXW	CoreCivic	Industrials	Diversified Support Services	Brentwood, Tennessee	view	0001070985
CZR	Caesars Entertainment	Consumer Discretionary	Casinos & Gaming	Reno, Nevada	view	0001590895
DAN	Dana Incorporated	Consumer Discretionary	Automotive Parts & Equipment	Maumee, Ohio	view	0000026780
DAVE	Dave, Inc.	Financials	Consumer Finance	Los Angeles, California	view	0001841408
DBD	Diebold Nixdorf	Information Technology	Electronic Equipment & Instruments	North Canton, Ohio	view	0000028823
DCH	Dauch Corporation	Consumer Discretionary	Automotive Parts & Equipment	Detroit, Michigan	view	0001062231
DCOM	Dime Community Bancshares, Inc.	Financials	Regional Banks	Hauppauge, New York	view	0000846617
DEA	Easterly Government Properties, Inc.	Real Estate	Office REITs	Washington, D.C.	view	0001622194
DEI	Douglas Emmett	Real Estate	Office REITs	Santa Monica, California	view	0001364250
DFH	Dream Finders Homes, Inc.	Consumer Discretionary	Homebuilding	Jacksonville, Florida	view	0001825088
DFIN	Donnelley Financial Solutions, Inc.	Financials	Financial Exchanges & Data	Chicago, Illinois	view	0001669811
DGII	Digi International Inc.	Information Technology	Communications Equipment	Hopkins, Minnesota	view	0000854775
DIOD	Diodes Incorporated	Information Technology	Semiconductors	Plano, Texas	view	0000029002
DLX	Deluxe Corporation	Industrials	Commercial Printing	Minneapolis, Minnesota	view	0000027996
DMC	Del Monte Corporation	Consumer Staples	Packaged Foods & Meats	Coral Gables, Florida	view	0001047340
DNOW	NOW Inc	Industrials	Trading Companies & Distributors	Houston, Texas	view	0001599617
DORM	Dorman Products, Inc.	Consumer Discretionary	Automotive Parts & Equipment	Colmar, Pennsylvania	view	0000868780
DRH	DiamondRock Hospitality Company	Real Estate	Hotel & Resort REITs	Bethesda, Maryland	view	0001298946
DV	DoubleVerify Holdings Inc.	Communication Services	Advertising	New York City, New York	view	0001819928
DXC	DXC Technology	Information Technology	IT Consulting & Other Services	Ashburn, Virginia	view	0001688568
DXPE	DXP Enterprises, Inc.	Industrials	Trading Companies & Distributors	Houston, Texas	view	0001020710
EAT	Brinker International, Inc.	Consumer Discretionary	Restaurants	Dallas, Texas	view	0000703351
EBC	Eastern Bankshares, Inc.	Financials	Regional Banks	Boston, Massachusetts	view	0001810546
ECG	Everus Construction Group, Inc.	Industrials	Construction & Engineering	Bismarck, North Dakota	view	0002015845
ECPG	Encore Capital Group, Inc.	Financials	Consumer Finance	San Diego, California	view	0001084961
EFC	Ellington Financial, Inc.	Financials	Specialized Finance	Greenwich, Connecticut	view	0001411342
EFOR	Everforth Inc.	Information Technology	IT Consulting & Other Services	Glen Allen, Virginia	view	0000890564
EGBN	Eagle Bancorp Inc	Financials	Regional Banks	Bethesda, Maryland	view	0001050441
EIG	Employers Holdings, Inc.	Financials	Property & Casualty Insurance	Henderson, Nevada	view	0001379041
EMN	Eastman Chemical Company	Materials	Specialty Chemicals	Kingsport, Tennessee	view	0000915389
ENOV	Enovis	Health Care	Health Care Equipment	Wilmington, Delaware	view	0001420800
ENPH	Enphase Energy	Information Technology	Semiconductor Materials & Equipment	Fremont, California	view	0001463101
ENR	Energizer	Consumer Staples	Household Products	St. Louis, Missouri	view	0001632790
ENVA	Enova International, Inc.	Financials	Consumer Finance	Chicago, Illinois	view	0001529864
EPAC	Enerpac Tool Group	Industrials	Industrial Machinery & Supplies & Components	Menomonee Falls, Wisconsin	view	0000006955
EPAM	EPAM Systems	Information Technology	IT Consulting & Other Services	Newtown, Pennsylvania	view	0001352010
EPC	Edgewell Personal Care	Consumer Staples	Household Products	Shelton, Connecticut	view	0001096752
EPRT	Essential Properties Realty Trust, Inc.	Real Estate	Diversified REITs	Princeton, New Jersey	view	0001728951
ESE	ESCO Technologies Inc.	Industrials	Industrial Machinery & Supplies & Components	St. Louis, Missouri	view	0000866706
ESI	Element Solutions	Materials	Specialty Chemicals	Fort Lauderdale, Florida	view	0001590714
ETSY	Etsy	Consumer Discretionary	Broadline Retail	New York City, New York	view	0001370637
EVTC	EVERTEC, Inc.	Financials	Transaction & Payment Processing Services	San Juan, Puerto Rico	view	0001559865
EXTR	Extreme Networks, Inc.	Information Technology	Communications Equipment	Morrisville, North Carolina	view	0001078271
EYE	National Vision Holdings	Consumer Discretionary	Other Specialty Retail	Duluth, Georgia	view	0001710155
EZPW	EZCORP, Inc.	Financials	Consumer Finance	Austin, Texas	view	0000876523
FA	First Advantage Corporation	Industrials	Human Resource & Employment Services	Atlanta, Georgia	view	0001210677
FBK	FB Financial Corp.	Financials	Regional Banks	Nashville, Tennessee	view	0001649749
FBNC	First Bancorp (Southern Pines NC)	Financials	Regional Banks	Southern Pines, North Carolina	view	0000811589
FBP	First BanCorp (Puerto Rico)	Financials	Regional Banks	San Juan, Puerto Rico	view	0001057706
FBRT	Franklin BSP Realty Trust, Inc.	Real Estate	Mortgage REITs	New York City, New York	view	0001562528
FCF	First Commonwealth Financial, Corp.	Financials	Regional Banks	Indiana, Pennsylvania	view	0000712537
FCPT	Four Corners Property Trust, Inc.	Real Estate	Other Specialized REITs	Mill Valley, California	view	0001650132
FELE	Franklin Electric	Industrials	Industrial Machinery & Supplies & Components	Fort Wayne, Indiana	view	0000038725
FFBC	First Financial Bancorp	Financials	Regional Banks	Cincinnati, Ohio	view	0000708955
FG	F&G Annuities & Life, Inc.	Financials	Life & Health Insurance	Des Moines, Iowa	view	0001934850
FHB	First Hawaiian, Inc.	Financials	Regional Banks	Honolulu, Hawaii	view	0000036377
FIBK	First Interstate BancSystem, Inc.	Financials	Regional Banks	Billings, Montana	view	0000860413
FIVN	Five9, Inc.	Information Technology	Application Software	San Ramon, California	view	0001288847
FIZZ	National Beverage Corp.	Consumer Staples	Soft Drinks & Non-alcoholic Beverages	Fort Lauderdale, Florida	view	0000069891
FLO	Flowers Foods	Consumer Staples	Packaged Foods & Meats	Thomasville, Georgia	view	0001128928
FMC	FMC Corporation	Materials	Fertilizers & Agricultural Chemicals	Philadelphia, Pennsylvania	view	0000037785
FORM	FormFactor, Inc.	Information Technology	Semiconductor Materials & Equipment	Livermore, California	view	0001039399
FOXF	Fox Factory	Consumer Discretionary	Automotive Parts & Equipment	Duluth, Georgia	view	0001424929
FRPT	Freshpet	Consumer Staples	Packaged Foods & Meats	Bedminster, New Jersey	view	0001611647
FSS	Federal Signal Corporation	Industrials	Construction Machinery & Heavy Transportation Equipment	Oak Brook, Illinois	view	0000277509
FTDR	Frontdoor, Inc.	Consumer Discretionary	Specialized Consumer Services	Memphis, Tennessee	view	0001727263
FTRE	Fortrea	Health Care	Biotechnology	Durham, North Carolina	view	0001965040
FUL	H.B. Fuller Company	Materials	Specialty Chemicals	Vadnais Heights, Minnesota	view	0000039368
FULT	Fulton Financial Corporation	Financials	Regional Banks	Lancaster, Pennsylvania	view	0000700564
FUN	Six Flags	Consumer Discretionary	Leisure Facilities	Charlotte, North Carolina	view	0001999001
GBX	The Greenbrier Companies, Inc.	Industrials	Construction Machinery & Heavy Transportation Equipment	Lake Oswego, Oregon	view	0000923120
GEO	GEO Group, Inc.	Industrials	Environmental & Facilities Services	Boca Raton, Florida	view	0000923796
GFF	Griffon Corporation	Industrials	Building Products	New York City, New York	view	0000050725
GIII	G-III Apparel Group, Ltd.	Consumer Discretionary	Apparel, Accessories & Luxury Goods	New York City, New York	view	0000821002
GKOS	Glaukos Corp.	Health Care	Health Care Equipment	San Clemente, California	view	0001192448
GNL	Global Net Lease, Inc.	Real Estate	Diversified REITs	New York City, New York	view	0001526113
GNW	Genworth Financial, Inc.	Financials	Multi-line Insurance	Henrico County, Virginia	view	0001276520
GO	Grocery Outlet	Consumer Staples	Food Retail	Emeryville, California	view	0001771515
GOLF	Acushnet Company	Consumer Discretionary	Leisure Products	Fairhaven, Massachusetts	view	0001672013
GPI	Group 1 Automotive, Inc.	Consumer Discretionary	Automotive Retail	Houston, Texas	view	0001031203
GPOR	Gulfport Energy Corporation	Energy	Oil & Gas Exploration & Production	Oklahoma City, Oklahoma	view	0000874499
GRBK	Green Brick Partners, Inc.	Consumer Discretionary	Homebuilding	Plano, Texas	view	0001373670
GSHD	Goosehead Insurance, Inc.	Financials	Insurance Brokers	Westlake, Texas	view	0001726978
GT	Goodyear Tire and Rubber Company	Consumer Discretionary	Tires & Rubber	Akron, Ohio	view	0000042582
GTES	Gates Corporation	Industrials	Industrial Machinery & Supplies & Components	Denver, Colorado	view	0001718512
GTM	ZoomInfo	Communication Services	Interactive Media & Services	Vancouver, Washington	view	0001794515
GTY	Getty Realty Corp.	Real Estate	Retail REITs	New York City, New York	view	0001052752
GVA	Granite Construction, Inc.	Industrials	Construction & Engineering	Watsonville, California	view	0000861459
HAFC	Hanmi Financial Corporation	Financials	Regional Banks	Los Angeles, California	view	0001109242
HASI	Hannon Armstrong Sustainable Infrastructure Capital, Inc.	Financials	Specialized Finance	Annapolis, Maryland	view	0001561894
HAYW	Hayward Holdings, Inc.	Industrials	Electrical Components & Equipment	Charlotte, North Carolina	view	0001834622
HCC	Warrior Met Coal, Inc.	Materials	Steel	Brookwood, Alabama	view	0001691303
HCI	HCI Group, Inc.	Financials	Property & Casualty Insurance	Tampa, Florida	view	0001400810
HCSG	Healthcare Services Group, Inc.	Industrials	Environmental & Facilities Services	Bensalem Township, Pennsylvania	view	0000731012
HE	Hawaiian Electric Industries, Inc.	Utilities	Electric Utilities	Honolulu, Hawaii	view	0000354707
HFWA	Heritage Financial Corporation	Financials	Regional Banks	Olympia, Washington	view	0001046025
HIW	Highwoods Properties	Real Estate	Office REITs	Raleigh, North Carolina	view	0000921082
HLIT	Harmonic Inc.	Information Technology	Communications Equipment	San Jose, California	view	0000851310
HLX	Helix Energy Solutions Group, Inc.	Energy	Oil & Gas Equipment & Services	Houston, Texas	view	0000866829
HMN	Horace Mann Educators Corporation	Financials	Multi-line Insurance	Springfield, Illinois	view	0000850141
HNI	HNI Corporation	Industrials	Office Services & Supplies	Muscatine, Iowa	view	0000048287
HOPE	Hope Bancorp, Inc.	Financials	Regional Banks	Los Angeles, California	view	0001128361
HP	Helmerich & Payne, Inc.	Energy	Oil & Gas Drilling	Tulsa, Oklahoma	view	0000046765
HRMY	Harmony Biosciences Holdings, Inc.	Health Care	Biotechnology	Plymouth Meeting, Pennsylvania	view	0001802665
HSTM	HealthStream, Inc.	Health Care	Health Care Technology	Nashville, Tennessee	view	0001095565
HTH	Hilltop Holdings Inc.	Financials	Regional Banks	Dallas, Texas	view	0001265131
HTLD	Heartland Express, Inc.	Industrials	Cargo Ground Transportation	North Liberty, Iowa	view	0000799233
HTO	H2O America	Utilities	Water Utilities	San Jose, California	view	0000766829
HUBG	Hub Group, Inc.	Industrials	Air Freight & Logistics	Oak Brook, Illinois	view	0000940942
HWKN	Hawkins, Inc.	Materials	Commodity Chemicals	Roseville, Minnesota	view	0000046250
HZO	MarineMax, Inc.	Consumer Discretionary	Other Specialty Retail	Clearwater, Florida	view	0001057060
IART	Integra Lifesciences Holdings	Health Care	Health Care Equipment	Princeton, New Jersey	view	0000917520
IBP	Installed Building Products, Inc.	Consumer Discretionary	Homebuilding	Columbus, Ohio	view	0001580905
ICHR	Ichor Holdings, Ltd.	Information Technology	Semiconductor Materials & Equipment	Fremont, California	view	0001652535
ICUI	ICU Medical	Health Care	Health Care Supplies	San Clemente, California	view	0000883984
IIPR	Innovative Industrial Properties, Inc.	Real Estate	Industrial REITs	Park City, Utah	view	0001677576
INDB	Independent Bank Corp.	Financials	Regional Banks	Rockland, Massachusetts	view	0000776901
INDV	Indivior	Health Care	Pharmaceuticals	Chesterfield County, Virginia	view	0001625297
INSP	Inspire Medical Systems, Inc.	Health Care	Health Care Equipment	Golden Valley, Minnesota	view	0001609550
INSW	International Seaways, Inc.	Energy	Oil & Gas Storage & Transportation	New York City, New York	view	0001679049
INVA	Innoviva, Inc.	Health Care	Pharmaceuticals	Burlingame, California	view	0001080014
INVX	Innovex International, Inc.	Energy	Oil & Gas Equipment & Services	Houston, Texas	view	0001042893
IOSP	Innospec, Inc.	Materials	Specialty Chemicals	Englewood, Colorado	view	0001054905
IPAR	Inter Parfums, Inc.	Consumer Staples	Household Products	New York City, New York	view	0000822663
IRDM	Iridium Communications	Communication Services	Alternative Carriers	McLean, Virginia	view	0001418819
ITGR	Integer Holdings Corporation	Health Care	Health Care Equipment	Plano, Texas	view	0001114483
ITRI	Itron, Inc.	Information Technology	Electronic Equipment & Instruments	Liberty Lake, Washington	view	0000780571
IVT	InvenTrust Properties	Real Estate	Retail REITs	Downers Grove, Illinois	view	0001307748
JBGS	JBG Smith	Real Estate	Office REITs	Bethesda, Maryland	view	0001689796
JBLU	JetBlue	Industrials	Passenger Airlines	Long Island City, New York	view	0001158463
JBSS	John B. Sanfilippo & Son, Inc.	Consumer Staples	Packaged Foods & Meats	Elgin, Illinois	view	0000880117
JBTM	JBT Marel Corporation	Industrials	Industrial Machinery & Supplies & Components	Chicago, Illinois	view	0001433660
JJSF	J&J Snack Foods Corp.	Consumer Staples	Packaged Foods & Meats	Pennsauken Township, New Jersey	view	0000785956
JOE	St. Joe Company	Real Estate	Real Estate Development	Panama City Beach, Florida	view	0000745308
JXN	Jackson Financial, Inc.	Financials	Life & Health Insurance	Lansing, Michigan	view	0001822993
KAI	Kadant Inc.	Industrials	Industrial Machinery & Supplies & Components	Westford, Massachusetts	view	0000886346
KALU	Kaiser Aluminum Corporation	Materials	Aluminum	Franklin, Tennessee	view	0000811596
KFY	Korn/Ferry International	Industrials	Human Resource & Employment Services	Los Angeles, California	view	0000056679
KGS	Kodiak Gas Services, Inc.	Energy	Oil & Gas Equipment & Services	The Woodlands, Texas	view	0001767042
KLIC	Kulicke and Soffa Industries, Inc.	Information Technology	Semiconductor Materials & Equipment	Serangoon, North-East Region, Singapore	view	0000056978
KMPR	Kemper Corporation	Financials	Multi-line Insurance	Chicago, Illinois	view	0000860748
KMT	Kennametal	Industrials	Industrial Machinery & Supplies & Components	Pittsburgh, Pennsylvania	view	0000055242
KMX	CarMax, Inc.	Consumer Discretionary	Automotive Retail	Richmond, Virginia	view	0001170010
KN	Knowles Corporation	Information Technology	Electronic Components	Itasca, Illinois	view	0001587523
KNTK	Kinetik Holdings, Inc.	Energy	Oil & Gas Storage & Transportation	Midland, Texas	view	0001692787
KOP	Koppers Holdings, Inc.	Materials	Commodity Chemicals	Pittsburgh, Pennsylvania	view	0001315257
KRMN	Karman Holdings	Industrials	Aerospace & Defense	Huntington Beach, California	view	0002040127
KSS	Kohl's Corp.	Consumer Discretionary	Broadline Retail	Menomonee Falls, Wisconsin	view	0000885639
KTB	Kontoor Brands	Consumer Discretionary	Apparel, Accessories & Luxury Goods	Greensboro, North Carolina	view	0001760965
KWR	Quaker Chemical Corporation	Materials	Specialty Chemicals	Conshohocken, Pennsylvania	view	0000081362
LAUR	Laureate Education, Inc.	Consumer Discretionary	Education Services	Miami, Florida	view	0000912766
LAZ	Lazard	Financials	Diversified Capital Markets	New York City, New York	view	0001311370
LBRT	Liberty Energy, Inc.	Energy	Oil & Gas Equipment & Services	Denver, Colorado	view	0001694028
LCII	LCI Industries	Consumer Discretionary	Automotive Parts & Equipment	Elkhart, Indiana	view	0000763744
LEG	Leggett & Platt	Consumer Discretionary	Home Furnishings	Carthage, Missouri	view	0000058492
LEU	Centrus Energy Corp.	Energy	Coal & Consumable Fuels	Bethesda, Maryland	view	0001065059
LFST	Lifestance Health	Health Care	Health Care Services	Scottsdale, Arizona	view	0001845257
LGIH	LGI Homes	Consumer Discretionary	Homebuilding	The Woodlands, Texas	view	0001580670
LIF	Life360	Information Technology	Application Software	San Mateo, California	view	0001581760
LGND	Ligand Pharmaceuticals, Inc.	Health Care	Biotechnology	San Diego, California	view	0000886163
LKFN	Lakeland Financial	Financials	Regional Banks	Warsaw, Indiana	view	0000721994
LKQ	LKQ Corporation	Consumer Discretionary	Distributors	Nashville, Tennessee	view	0001065696
LMAT	LeMaitre Vascular	Health Care	Health Care Equipment	Burlington, Massachusetts	view	0001158895
LNC	Lincoln Financial	Financials	Multi-line Insurance	Radnor, Pennsylvania	view	0000059558
LNN	Lindsay Corporation	Materials	Agricultural & Farm Machinery	Omaha, Nebraska	view	0000836157
LPG	Dorian LPG Ltd.	Energy	Oil & Gas Storage & Transportation	Stamford, Connecticut	view	0001596993
LQDA	Liquidia Corporation	Health Care	Pharmaceuticals	Morrisville, North Carolina	view	0001819576
LQDT	Liquidity Services, Inc.	Industrials	Diversified Support Services	Bethesda, Maryland	view	0001235468
LRN	Stride, Inc.	Consumer Discretionary	Education Services	Herndon, Virginia	view	0001157408
LTC	LTC Properties, Inc.	Real Estate	Health Care REITs	Westlake Village, California	view	0000887905
LTH	Life Time Group Holdings, Inc.	Consumer Discretionary	Leisure Facilities	Chanhassen, Minnesota	view	0001869198
LUMN	Lumen Technologies	Communication Services	Alternative Carriers	Monroe, Louisiana	view	0000018926
LW	Lamb Weston	Consumer Staples	Packaged Foods & Meats	Eagle, Idaho	view	0001679273
LXP	Lexington Realty Trust	Real Estate	Diversified REITs	New York City, New York	view	0000910108
LYFT	Lyft, Inc.	Industrials	Passenger Ground Transportation	San Francisco, California	view	0001759509
LZ	LegalZoom.com, Inc.	Industrials	Research & Consulting Services	Mountain View, California	view	0001286139
LZB	La-Z-Boy, Inc.	Consumer Discretionary	Home Furnishings	Monroe, Michigan	view	0000057131
MAC	Macerich	Real Estate	Retail REITs	Santa Monica, California	view	0000912242
MAN	ManpowerGroup	Industrials	Human Resource & Employment Services	Milwaukee, Wisconsin	view	0000871763
MARA	MARA Holdings, Inc.	Information Technology	Internet Services & Infrastructure	Fort Lauderdale, Florida	view	0001507605
MATW	Matthews International Corporation	Consumer Discretionary	Specialized Consumer Services	Pittsburgh, Pennsylvania	view	0000063296
MATX	Matson, Inc.	Industrials	Marine Transportation	Honolulu, Hawaii	view	0000003453
MBC	MasterBrand, Inc.	Industrials	Building Products	Jasper, Indiana	view	0001941365
MBGL	Mobility Global, Inc.	Industrials	Data Processing & Outsourced Services	New York City, New York	view	0002090312
MBIN	Merchants Bancorp	Financials	Regional Banks	Carmel, Indiana	view	0001629019
MC	Moelis & Company	Financials	Investment Banking & Brokerage	New York City, New York	view	0001596967
MCRI	Monarch Casino & Resort, Inc.	Consumer Discretionary	Casinos & Gaming	Reno, Nevada	view	0000907242
MCY	Mercury General	Financials	Property & Casualty Insurance	Los Angeles, California	view	0000064996
MD	Pediatrix Medical Group	Health Care	Health Care Services	Sunrise, Florida	view	0000893949
MDU	MDU Resources Group, Inc.	Utilities	Multi-Utilities	Bismarck, North Dakota	view	0000067716
MFP	Midera Food Processing, Inc.	Industrials	Industrial Machinery & Supplies & Components	Elgin, Illinois	view	0002088281
MGEE	MGE Energy, Inc.	Utilities	Electric Utilities	Madison, Wisconsin	view	0001161728
MGY	Magnolia Oil & Gas, Corp.	Energy	Oil & Gas Exploration & Production	Houston, Texas	view	0001698990
MHK	Mohawk Industries	Consumer Discretionary	Home Furnishings	Calhoun, Georgia	view	0000851968
MHO	M/I Homes, Inc.	Consumer Discretionary	Homebuilding	Columbus, Ohio	view	0000799292
MIR	Mirion Technologies, Inc.	Information Technology	Electronic Equipment & Instruments	Atlanta, Georgia	view	0001809987
MKTX	MarketAxess	Financials	Financial Exchanges & Data	New York City, New York	view	0001278021
MLKN	MillerKnoll, Inc.	Industrials	Office Services & Supplies	Zeeland, Michigan	view	0000066382
MMI	Marcus & Millichap, Inc.	Real Estate	Real Estate Services	Calabasas, California	view	0001578732
MMSI	Merit Medical Systems, Inc.	Health Care	Health Care Supplies	South Jordan, Utah	view	0000856982
MPT	Medical Properties Trust	Real Estate	Health Care REITs	Birmingham, Alabama	view	0001287865
MRCY	Mercury Systems	Industrials	Electrical Components & Equipment	Andover, Massachusetts	view	0001049521
MRP	Millrose Properties, Inc.	Real Estate	Single-Family Residential REITs	Chevy Chase, Maryland	view	0002017206
MRTN	Marten Transport, Ltd.	Industrials	Cargo Ground Transportation	Mondovi, Wisconsin	view	0000799167
MSEX	Middlesex Water Company	Utilities	Water Utilities	Iselin, New Jersey	view	0000066004
MSGK	MSG Knickerbockers Corp.	Communication Services	Movies & Entertainment	New York City, New York	view	0001636519
MTCH	Match Group	Communication Services	Interactive Media & Services	Dallas, Texas	view	0000891103
MTH	Meritage Homes Corporation	Consumer Discretionary	Homebuilding	Scottsdale, Arizona	view	0000833079
MTRN	Materion Corp.	Materials	Diversified Metals & Mining	Mayfield Heights, Ohio	view	0001104657
MTUS	Metallus Inc	Materials	Steel	Canton, Ohio	view	0001598428
MTX	Minerals Technologies	Materials	Specialty Chemicals	New York City, New York	view	0000891014
MWA	Mueller Water Products	Industrials	Industrial Machinery & Supplies & Components	Atlanta, Georgia	view	0001350593
MXL	MaxLinear, Inc.	Information Technology	Semiconductors	Carlsbad, California	view	0001288469
MYRG	MYR Group, Inc.	Industrials	Construction & Engineering	Thornton, Colorado	view	0000700923
NABL	N-able, Inc.	Information Technology	Systems Software	Wilmington, Delaware	view	0001834488
NATL	NCR Atleos	Financials	Transaction & Payment Processing Services	Atlanta, Georgia	view	0001974138
NAVI	Navient	Financials	Consumer Finance	Wilmington, Delaware	view	0001593538
NBHC	National Bank Holdings Corporation	Financials	Regional Banks	Greenwood Village, Colorado	view	0001475841
NBTB	NBT Bancorp, Inc.	Financials	Regional Banks	Norwich, New York	view	0000790359
NE	Noble Corporation	Energy	Oil & Gas Drilling	Houston, Texas	view	0001895262
NEO	NeoGenomics Laboratories, Inc.	Health Care	Health Care Services	Fort Myers, Florida	view	0001077183
NEOG	Neogen	Health Care	Health Care Supplies	Lansing, Michigan	view	0000711377
NGVT	Ingevity, Corp.	Materials	Specialty Chemicals	North Charleston, South Carolina	view	0001653477
NHC	National Healthcare, Corp.	Health Care	Health Care Facilities	Murfreesboro, Tennessee	view	0001047335
NHI	National Health Investors, Inc.	Real Estate	Health Care REITs	Murfreesboro, Tennessee	view	0000877860
NIC	Nicolet Bankshares	Financials	Regional Banks	Murfreesboro, Tennessee	view	0001174850
NMIH	NMI Holdings, Inc.	Financials	Commercial & Residential Mortgage Finance	Emeryville, California	view	0001547903
NOG	Northern Oil and Gas, Inc.	Energy	Oil & Gas Exploration & Production	Minnetonka, Minnesota	view	0001104485
NPK	National Presto Industries, Inc.	Industrials	Aerospace & Defense	Eau Claire, Wisconsin	view	0000080172
NPO	EnPro Industries, Inc.	Industrials	Industrial Machinery & Supplies & Components	Charlotte, North Carolina	view	0001164863
NSIT	Insight Enterprises, Inc.	Industrials	Technology Distributors	Tempe, Arizona	view	0000932696
NSP	Insperity	Industrials	Human Resource & Employment Services	Houston, Texas	view	0001000753
NSSC	Napco Security Technologies	Information Technology	Electronic Equipment & Instruments	Amityville, New York	view	0000069633
NTCT	NETSCOUT Systems, Inc.	Information Technology	Communications Equipment	Westford, Massachusetts	view	0001078075
NTST	NETSTREIT Corp.	Real Estate	Retail REITs	Dallas, Texas	view	0001798100
NWBI	Northwest Bancshares, Inc.	Financials	Regional Banks	Warren, Pennsylvania	view	0001471265
NWL	Newell Brands	Consumer Discretionary	Housewares & Specialties	Atlanta, Georgia	view	0000814453
NWN	NW Natural	Utilities	Gas Utilities	Portland, Oregon	view	0001733998
NX	Quanex Building Products Corporation	Industrials	Building Products	Houston, Texas	view	0001423221
NXRT	NexPoint Residential Trust, Inc.	Real Estate	Multi-Family Residential REITs	Dallas, Texas	view	0001620393
OFG	OFG Bancorp	Financials	Regional Banks	San Juan, Puerto Rico	view	0001030469
OGN	Organon & Co.	Health Care	Pharmaceuticals	Jersey City, New Jersey	view	0001821825
OI	O-I Glass, Inc.	Materials	Metal, Glass & Plastic Containers	Perrysburg, Ohio	view	0000812074
OII	Oceaneering International, Inc.	Energy	Oil & Gas Equipment & Services	Houston, Texas	view	0000073756
OMCL	Omnicell	Health Care	Health Care Technology	Fort Worth, Texas	view	0000926326
OPLN	OPENLANE, Inc.	Industrials	Diversified Support Services	Carmel, Indiana	view	0001395942
OSIS	OSI Systems, Inc.	Information Technology	Electronic Equipment & Instruments	Hawthorne, California	view	0001039065
OSW	OneSpaWorld Holdings Limited	Consumer Discretionary	Leisure Facilities	Nassau, Bahamas	view	0001758488
OTTR	Otter Tail Corporation	Utilities	Electric Utilities	Fergus Falls, Minnesota	view	0001466593
OUT	Outfront Media	Real Estate	Other Specialized REITs	New York City, New York	view	0001579877
PAHC	Phibro Animal Health	Health Care	Pharmaceuticals	Teaneck, New Jersey	view	0001069899
PARR	Par Pacific Holdings, Inc.	Energy	Oil & Gas Refining & Marketing	Houston, Texas	view	0000821483
PAYC	Paycom	Industrials	Human Resource & Employment Services	Oklahoma City, Oklahoma	view	0001590955
PAYO	Payoneer Global Inc.	Financials	Transaction & Payment Processing Services	New York City, New York	view	0001845815
PATK	Patrick Industries, Inc.	Consumer Discretionary	Automotive Parts & Equipment	Elkhart, Indiana	view	0000076605
PBH	Prestige Consumer Healthcare	Health Care	Pharmaceuticals	Tarrytown, New York	view	0001295947
PBI	Pitney Bowes, Inc.	Industrials	Office Services & Supplies	Stamford, Connecticut	view	0000078814
PCRX	Pacira BioSciences, Inc.	Health Care	Pharmaceuticals	Tampa, Florida	view	0001396814
PDFS	PDF Solutions, Inc.	Information Technology	Semiconductor Materials & Equipment	Santa Clara, California	view	0001120914
PEB	Pebblebrook Hotel Trust	Real Estate	Hotel & Resort REITs	Bethesda, Maryland	view	0001474098
PECO	Phillips Edison & Company	Real Estate	Retail REITs	Cincinnati, Ohio	view	0001476204
PENG	Penguin Solutions, Inc.	Information Technology	Semiconductors	Milpitas, California	view	0001616533
PENN	Penn Entertainment	Consumer Discretionary	Casinos & Gaming	Wyomissing, Pennsylvania	view	0000921738
PFBC	Preferred Bank	Financials	Regional Banks	Los Angeles, California	view	0001492165
PFS	Provident Financial Services, Inc.	Financials	Regional Banks	Jersey City, New Jersey	view	0001178970
PGNY	Progyny, Inc.	Health Care	Health Care Services	New York City, New York	view	0001551306
PHIN	PHINIA, Inc.	Consumer Discretionary	Automotive Retail	Auburn Hills, Michigan	view	0001968915
PI	Impinj, Inc.	Information Technology	Electronic Equipment & Instruments	Seattle, Washington	view	0001114995
PIPR	Piper Sandler Companies	Financials	Investment Banking & Brokerage	Minneapolis, Minnesota	view	0001230245
PJT	PJT Partners, Inc.	Financials	Investment Banking & Brokerage	New York City, New York	view	0001626115
PLAB	Photronics, Inc.	Information Technology	Semiconductor Materials & Equipment	Brookfield, Connecticut	view	0000810136
PLMR	Palomar Holdings, Inc.	Financials	Property & Casualty Insurance	La Jolla, California	view	0001761312
PLUS	ePlus, Inc.	Information Technology	Technology Distributors	Herndon, Virginia	view	0001022408
PLXS	Plexus Corp.	Information Technology	Electronic Manufacturing Services	Neenah, Wisconsin	view	0000785786
PMT	PennyMac Mortgage Investment Trust	Real Estate	Mortgage REITs	Westlake Village, California	view	0001464423
POOL	Pool Corporation	Consumer Discretionary	Distributors	Covington, Louisiana	view	0000945841
POWI	Power Integrations	Information Technology	Semiconductors	San Jose, California	view	0000833640
POWL	Powell Industries, Inc.	Industrials	Electrical Components & Equipment	Houston, Texas	view	0000080420
PPLI	People Inc.	Communication Services	Interactive Media & Services	New York City, New York	view	0001800227
PRDO	Perdoceo Education Corp.	Consumer Discretionary	Education Services	Schaumburg, Illinois	view	0001046568
PRG	PROG Holdings, Inc.	Financials	Consumer Finance	Draper, Utah	view	0001808834
PRGO	Perrigo	Health Care	Pharmaceuticals	Grand Rapids, Michigan	view	0001585364
PRGS	Progress Software Corporation	Information Technology	Systems Software	Burlington, Massachusetts	view	0000876167
PRIM	Primoris Services Corporation	Industrials	Construction & Engineering	Dallas, Texas	view	0001361538
PRK	Park National Corp.	Financials	Regional Banks	Newark, Ohio	view	0000805676
PRKS	United Parks & Resorts	Consumer Discretionary	Leisure Facilities	Orlando, Florida	view	0001564902
PRLB	Protolabs	Industrials	Industrial Machinery & Supplies & Components	Maple Plain, Minnesota	view	0001443669
PRSU	Pursuit Attractions & Hospitality, Inc.	Consumer Discretionary	Hotels, Resorts & Cruise Lines	Scottsdale, Arizona	view	0000884219
PRVA	Privia Health Group, Inc.	Health Care	Health Care Services	Arlington County, Virginia	view	0001759655
PSMT	PriceSmart	Consumer Staples	Consumer Staples Merchandise Retail	San Diego, California	view	0001041803
PTCT	PTC Therapeutics, Inc.	Health Care	Pharmaceuticals	Warren Township, New Jersey	view	0001070081
PTEN	Patterson-UTI Energy, Inc.	Energy	Oil & Gas Drilling	Houston, Texas	view	0000889900
PTGX	Protagonist Therapeutics, Inc.	Health Care	Biotechnology	Newark, California	view	0001377121
PTON	Peloton Interactive, Inc.	Consumer Discretionary	Leisure Products	New York City, New York	view	0001639825
PZZA	Papa John's Pizza	Consumer Discretionary	Restaurants	Jeffersontown, Kentucky	view	0000901491
QDEL	QuidelOrtho	Health Care	Health Care Supplies	San Diego, California	view	0001906324
QNST	QuinStreet, Inc.	Communication Services	Interactive Media & Services	Foster City, California	view	0001117297
QRVO	Qorvo	Information Technology	Semiconductors	Greensboro, North Carolina	view	0001604778
QTWO	Q2 Holdings, Inc.	Information Technology	Application Software	Austin, Texas	view	0001410384
RAMP	LiveRamp Holdings, Inc.	Information Technology	Application Software	San Francisco, California	view	0000733269
RAL	Ralliant Corp	Information Technology	Electronic Equipment & Instruments	New York City, New York	view	0002041385
RCUS	Arcus Biosciences, Inc.	Health Care	Biotechnology	Hayward, California	view	0001724521
RDN	Radian Group, Inc.	Financials	Property & Casualty Insurance	Philadelphia, Pennsylvania	view	0000890926
RDNT	RadNet, Inc.	Health Care	Health Care Services	Los Angeles, California	view	0000790526
RELY	Remitly	Financials	Transaction & Payment Processing Services	Seattle, Washington	view	0001782170
RES	RPC, Inc.	Energy	Oil & Gas Equipment & Services	Atlanta, Georgia	view	0000742278
REYN	Reynolds Consumer Products	Consumer Staples	Household Products	Lake Forest, Illinois	view	0001786431
REX	REX American Resources Corporation	Energy	Oil & Gas Refining & Marketing	Dayton, Ohio	view	0000744187
REZI	Resideo Technologies, Inc.	Industrials	Trading Companies & Distributors	Scottsdale, Arizona	view	0001740332
RHI	Robert Half	Industrials	Human Resource & Employment Services	Menlo Park, California	view	0000315213
RHP	Ryman Hospitality Properties	Real Estate	Hotel & Resort REITs	Nashville, Tennessee	view	0001040829
RITM	Rithm Capital	Financials	Mortgage REITs	New York City, New York	view	0001556593
RNG	RingCentral, Inc.	Information Technology	Application Software	Belmont, California	view	0001384905
RNST	Renasant Corp.	Financials	Regional Banks	Tupelo, Mississippi	view	0000715072
ROAD	Construction Partners, Inc.	Industrials	Construction & Engineering	Dothan, Alabama	view	0001718227
ROCK	Gibraltar Industries, Inc.	Industrials	Building Products	Buffalo, New York	view	0000912562
ROG	Rogers Corporation	Information Technology	Electronic Components	Chandler, Arizona	view	0000084748
RRR	Red Rock Resorts, Inc.	Consumer Discretionary	Casinos & Gaming	Las Vegas, Nevada	view	0001653653
RSI	Rush Street Interactive, Inc.	Consumer Discretionary	Casinos & Gaming	Chicago, Illinois	view	0001793659
RUN	Sunrun	Industrials	Building Products	San Francisco, California	view	0001469367
RUSHA	Rush Enterprises	Industrials	Construction Machinery & Heavy Transportation Equipment	New Braunfels, Texas	view	0001012019
RXO	RXO, Inc.	Industrials	Cargo Ground Transportation	Charlotte, North Carolina	view	0001929561
SAFE	Safehold, Inc.	Real Estate	Other Specialized REITs	New York City, New York	view	0001095651
SABR	Sabre	Consumer Discretionary	Hotels, Resorts & Cruise Lines	Southlake, Texas	view	0001597033
SAFT	Safety Insurance Group, Inc.	Financials	Property & Casualty Insurance	Boston, Massachusetts	view	0001172052
SAH	Sonic Automotive, Inc.	Consumer Discretionary	Automotive Retail	Charlotte, North Carolina	view	0001043509
SBCF	Seacoast Banking Corporation of Florida	Financials	Regional Banks	Stuart, Florida	view	0000730708
SBH	Sally Beauty Holdings, Inc.	Consumer Discretionary	Other Specialty Retail	Denton, Texas	view	0001368458
SBSI	Southside Bancshares, Inc.	Financials	Regional Banks	Tyler, Texas	view	0000705432
SCHL	Scholastic Corporation	Consumer Discretionary	Publishing	New York City, New York	view	0000866729
SCL	Stepan Company	Materials	Specialty Chemicals	Northfield, Illinois	view	0000094049
SCSC	ScanSource, Inc.	Information Technology	Technology Distributors	Greenville, South Carolina	view	0000918965
SDGR	Schrödinger, Inc.	Health Care	Health Care Services	New York City, New York	view	0001490978
SEDG	SolarEdge	Information Technology	Semiconductor Materials & Equipment	Herzliya, Israel	view	0001419612
SEI	Solaris Energy Infrastructure, Inc.	Energy	Oil & Gas Equipment & Services	Houston, Texas	view	0001697500
SEZL	Sezzle	Financials	Transaction & Payment Processing Services	Minneapolis, Minnesota	view	0001662991
SFBS	ServisFirst Bancshares, Inc.	Financials	Regional Banks	Birmingham, Alabama	view	0001430723
SFNC	Simmons First National Corporation	Financials	Regional Banks	Little Rock, Arkansas	view	0000090498
SHAK	Shake Shack, Inc.	Consumer Discretionary	Restaurants	New York City, New York	view	0001620533
SHEN	Shenandoah Telecommunications Co	Communication Services	Wireless Telecommunication Services	Edinburg, Virginia	view	0000354963
SHO	Sunstone Hotel Investors, Inc.	Real Estate	Hotel & Resort REITs	Aliso Viejo, California	view	0001295810
SHOO	Steven Madden, Ltd.	Consumer Discretionary	Footwear	Long Island City, New York	view	0000913241
SIG	Signet Jewelers	Consumer Discretionary	Other Specialty Retail	Akron, Ohio	view	0000832988
SKT	Tanger Factory Outlet Centers, Inc.	Real Estate	Retail REITs	Greensboro, North Carolina	view	0000899715
SKY	Champion Homes, Inc.	Consumer Discretionary	Homebuilding	Troy, Michigan	view	0000090896
SKYW	SkyWest, Inc.	Industrials	Passenger Airlines	St. George, Utah	view	0000793733
SLG	SL Green Realty	Real Estate	Office REITs	New York City, New York	view	0001040971
SLVM	Sylvamo Corp.	Materials	Paper Products	Memphis, Tennessee	view	0001856485
SM	SM Energy Company	Energy	Oil & Gas Exploration & Production	Denver, Colorado	view	0000893538
SMP	Standard Motor Products, Inc.	Consumer Discretionary	Automotive Parts & Equipment	Long Island City, New York	view	0000093389
SMPL	Simply Good Foods Company	Consumer Staples	Packaged Foods & Meats	Denver, Colorado	view	0001702744
SNDR	Schneider National	Industrials	Cargo Ground Transportation	Green Bay, Wisconsin	view	0001692063
SNEX	StoneX Group Inc.	Financials	Investment Banking & Brokerage	New York City, New York	view	0000913760
SONO	Sonos, Inc.	Consumer Discretionary	Consumer Electronics	Santa Barbara, California	view	0001314727
SPHR	Sphere Entertainment	Communication Services	Movies & Entertainment	New York City, New York	view	0001795250
SPNT	SiriusPoint Ltd.	Financials	Reinsurance	New York City, New York	view	0001576018
SPSC	SPS Commerce, Inc.	Information Technology	Application Software	Minneapolis, Minnesota	view	0001092699
SRPT	Sarepta Therapeutics	Health Care	Biotechnology	Cambridge, Massachusetts	view	0000873303
STAA	STAAR Surgical Company	Health Care	Health Care Equipment	Monrovia, California	view	0000718937
STBA	S&T Bancorp, Inc.	Financials	Regional Banks	Indiana, Pennsylvania	view	0000719220
STC	Stewart Information Services Corporation	Financials	Property & Casualty Insurance	Houston, Texas	view	0000094344
STEP	StepStone Group	Financials	Asset Management & Custody Banks	New York City, New York	view	0001796022
STRA	Strategic Education, Inc.	Consumer Discretionary	Education Services	Herndon, Virginia	view	0001013934
SUPN	Supernus, Inc.	Health Care	Pharmaceuticals	Rockville, Maryland	view	0001625297
SXI	Standex International Corporation	Industrials	Industrial Machinery & Supplies & Components	Salem, New Hampshire	view	0000310354
SXT	Sensient Technologies	Materials	Specialty Chemicals	Milwaukee, Wisconsin	view	0000310142
TALO	Talos Energy, Inc.	Energy	Oil & Gas Exploration & Production	Houston, Texas	view	0001724965
TBBK	The Bancorp, Inc.	Financials	Regional Banks	Wilmington, Delaware	view	0001295401
TDC	Teradata	Information Technology	IT Consulting & Other Services	San Diego, California	view	0000816761
TDS	Telephone and Data Systems, Inc.	Communication Services	Integrated Telecommunication Services	Chicago, Illinois	view	0001051512
TDW	Tidewater, Inc.	Energy	Oil & Gas Equipment & Services	Houston, Texas	view	0000098222
TFIN	Triumph Bancorp, Inc.	Financials	Regional Banks	Dallas, Texas	view	0001539638
TFX	Teleflex	Health Care	Health Care Equipment	Wayne, Pennsylvania	view	0000096943
TGTX	TG Therapeutics, Inc.	Health Care	Biotechnology	Morrisville, North Carolina	view	0001001316
THRM	Gentherm Incorporated	Consumer Discretionary	Automotive Parts & Equipment	Farmington Hills, Michigan	view	0000903129
TILE	Interface, Inc.	Industrials	Office Services & Supplies	Atlanta, Georgia	view	0000715787
TMDX	TransMedics Group, Inc.	Health Care	Health Care Equipment	Andover, Massachusetts	view	0001756262
TMP	Tompkins Financial Corporation	Financials	Regional Banks	Ithaca, New York	view	0001005817
TNC	Tennant Company	Industrials	Industrial Machinery & Supplies & Components	Eden Prairie, Minnesota	view	0000097134
TNDM	Tandem Diabetes Care	Health Care	Health Care Equipment	San Diego, California	view	0001438133
TPC	Tutor Perini Corporation	Industrials	Construction & Engineering	Los Angeles, California	view	0000077543
TR	Tootsie Roll Industries, Inc.	Consumer Staples	Packaged Foods & Meats	Chicago, Illinois	view	0000098677
TRIP	TripAdvisor	Communication Services	Interactive Media & Services	Needham, Massachusetts	view	0001526520
TRMK	Trustmark Corp.	Financials	Regional Banks	Jackson, Mississippi	view	0000036146
TRN	Trinity Industries, Inc.	Industrials	Construction Machinery & Heavy Transportation Equipment	Dallas, Texas	view	0000099780
TRNO	Terreno Realty Corporation	Real Estate	Industrial REITs	San Francisco, California	view	0001476150
TRST	TrustCo Bank Corp NY	Financials	Regional Banks	Glenville, New York	view	0000357301
TRUP	Trupanion	Financials	Life & Health Insurance	Seattle, Washington	view	0001371285
UA	Under Armour (Class C)	Consumer Discretionary	Apparel, Accessories & Luxury Goods	Baltimore, Maryland	view	0001336917
UAA	Under Armour (Class A)	Consumer Discretionary	Apparel, Accessories & Luxury Goods	Baltimore, Maryland	view	0001336917
UCB	United Community Banks, Inc.	Financials	Regional Banks	Greenville, South Carolina	view	0000857855
UCTT	Ultra Clean Holdings, Inc.	Information Technology	Semiconductor Materials & Equipment	Hayward, California	view	0001275014
UE	Urban Edge Properties	Real Estate	Retail REITs	Paramus, New Jersey	view	0001611547
UFCS	United Fire Group, Inc.	Financials	Property & Casualty Insurance	Cedar Rapids, Iowa	view	0000101199
UFPT	UFP Technologies, Inc.	Health Care	Health Care Equipment	Newburyport, Massachusetts	view	0000914156
UNF	UniFirst Corporation	Industrials	Diversified Support Services	Wilmington, Massachusetts	view	0000717954
UNFI	United Natural Foods Inc	Consumer Staples	Food Retail	Providence, Rhode Island	view	0001020859
UNIT	Uniti Group	Communication Services	Alternative Carriers	Little Rock, Arkansas	view	0002020795
UPBD	Upbound Group, Inc.	Consumer Discretionary	Computer & Electronics Retail	Plano, Texas	view	0000933036
UPWK	Upwork, Inc.	Industrials	Human Resource & Employment Services	Palo Alto, California	view	0001627475
URBN	Urban Outfitters, Inc.	Consumer Discretionary	Apparel Retail	Philadelphia, Pennsylvania	view	0000912615
USLM	United States Lime & Minerals, Inc.	Materials	Construction Materials	Dallas, Texas	view	0000082020
USPH	U.S. Physical Therapy, Inc.	Health Care	Health Care Facilities	Houston, Texas	view	0000885978
UTI	Universal Technical Institute	Consumer Discretionary	Education Services	Phoenix, Arizona	view	0001261654
UTL	Unitil Corporation	Utilities	Electric Utilities	Hampton, New Hampshire	view	0000755001
UVV	Universal Corporation	Consumer Staples	Tobacco	Richmond, Virginia	view	0000102037
VAC	Marriott Vacations Worldwide	Consumer Discretionary	Hotels, Resorts & Cruise Lines	Orlando, Florida	view	0001524358
VCEL	Vericel	Health Care	Biotechnology	Cambridge, Massachusetts	view	0000887359
VCTR	Victory Capital Holdings, Inc.	Financials	Asset Management & Custody Banks	San Antonio, Texas	view	0001570827
VCYT	Veracyte, Inc.	Health Care	Health Care Services	San Francisco, California	view	0001384101
VECO	Veeco Instruments Inc.	Information Technology	Semiconductor Materials & Equipment	Plainview, New York	view	0000103145
VGNT	Versigent PLC	Consumer Discretionary	Other Specialty Retail	Schaffhausen, Switzerland	view	0002078008
VIR	Vir Biotechnology, Inc.	Health Care	Biotechnology	San Francisco, California	view	0001706431
VIRT	Virtu Financial, Inc.	Financials	Financial Exchanges & Data	New York City, New York	view	0001592386
VRRM	Verra Mobility Corporation	Industrials	Data Processing & Outsourced Services	Mesa, Arizona	view	0001682745
VRTS	Virtus Investment Partners, Inc.	Financials	Asset Management & Custody Banks	Hartford, Connecticut	view	0000883237
VSAT	Viasat, Inc.	Information Technology	Communications Equipment	Carlsbad, California	view	0000797721
VSEC	VSE Corporation	Industrials	Aerospace & Defense	Miramar, Florida	view	0000102752
VSH	Vishay Intertechnology	Information Technology	Electronic Components	Malvern, Pennsylvania	view	0000103730
VSNT	Versant Media Group, Inc.	Communication Services	Cable & Satellite	Englewood Cliffs, New Jersey	view	0002067876
VSTS	Vestis	Industrials	Diversified Support Services	Roswell, Georgia	view	0001967649
VSXY	Victoria's Secret	Consumer Discretionary	Apparel Retail	Reynoldsburg, Ohio	view	0001856437
VTOL	Bristow Group Inc.	Energy	Oil & Gas Equipment & Services	Houston, Texas	view	0001525221
VVX	V2X, Inc.	Industrials	Aerospace & Defense	Reston, Virginia	view	0001601548
VYX	NCR Voyix	Information Technology	IT Consulting & Other Services	Atlanta, Georgia	view	0000070866
WABC	Westamerica Bank	Financials	Regional Banks	San Rafael, California	view	0000311094
WAFD	WaFd, Inc.	Financials	Regional Banks	Seattle, Washington	view	0000936528
WAY	Waystar Holding Corp	Health Care	Health Care Technology	Lehi, Utah	view	0001990354
WD	Walker & Dunlop, Inc.	Financials	Commercial & Residential Mortgage Finance	Bethesda, Maryland	view	0001497770
WDFC	WD-40 Company	Consumer Staples	Household Products	San Diego, California	view	0000105132
WEN	The Wendy's Company	Consumer Discretionary	Restaurants	Dublin, Ohio	view	0000030697
WERN	Werner Enterprises	Industrials	Cargo Ground Transportation	Omaha, Nebraska	view	0000793074
WGO	Winnebago Industries, Inc.	Consumer Discretionary	Automobile Manufacturers	Eden Prairie, Minnesota	view	0000107687
WHD	Cactus, Inc.	Energy	Oil & Gas Equipment & Services	Houston, Texas	view	0001699136
WINA	Winmark	Consumer Discretionary	Other Specialty Retail	Minneapolis, Minnesota	view	0000908315
WKC	World Kinect Corporation	Energy	Oil & Gas Refining & Marketing	Doral, Florida	view	0000789460
WLY	John Wiley & Sons	Communication Services	Publishing	Hoboken, New Jersey	view	0000107140
WOR	Worthington Enterprises	Industrials	Building Products	Columbus, Ohio	view	0000108516
WRBY	Warby Parker	Consumer Discretionary	Apparel, Accessories & Luxury Goods	New York City, New York	view	0001504776
WRLD	World Acceptance Corporation	Financials	Consumer Finance	Greenville, South Carolina	view	0000108385
WS	Worthington Steel	Materials	Steel	Columbus, Ohio	view	0001968487
WSBC	WesBanco	Financials	Regional Banks	Wheeling, West Virginia	view	0000203596
WSC	WillScot Holdings Corp.	Industrials	Office Services & Supplies	Phoenix, Arizona	view	0001647088
WSFS	WSFS Financial Corporation	Financials	Regional Banks	Wilmington, Delaware	view	0000828944
WT	WisdomTree Investments, Inc.	Financials	Asset Management & Custody Banks	New York City, New York	view	0000880631
WU	Western Union	Financials	Transaction & Payment Processing Services	Denver, Colorado	view	0001365135
WWW	Wolverine World Wide, Inc.	Consumer Discretionary	Footwear	Rockford, Michigan	view	0000110471
XHR	Xenia Hotels & Resorts, Inc.	Real Estate	Hotel & Resort REITs	Orlando, Florida	view	0001616000
XNCR	Xencor Inc	Health Care	Biotechnology	Pasadena, California	view	0001326732
XPEL	XPEL, Inc.	Consumer Discretionary	Automotive Parts & Equipment	San Antonio, Texas	view	0001767258
YELP	Yelp, Inc.	Communication Services	Interactive Media & Services	San Francisco, California	view	0001345016
YOU	Clear Secure, Inc.	Information Technology	Application Software	New York City, New York	view	0001856314
ZD	Ziff Davis	Communication Services	Advertising	New York City, New York	view	0001084048
ZWS	Zurn Elkay Water Solutions Corp.	Industrials	Industrial Machinery & Supplies & Components	Milwaukee, Wisconsin	view	0001439288

== Recent and announced changes to the list of S&P 600 components ==
Periodically, S&P Dow Jones Indices reflects the changes of the index in response to company takeover, or updates the index based on company market capitalization. Changes to index composition are made on an as needed basis. There is no scheduled reconstitution. Rather, changes in response to corporate actions and market developments can be made at any time.

Date	Added		Removed		Reason
Date	Ticker	Security	Ticker	Security	Reason
August 4, 2026	ADIG	ADI Global Distribution	HTZ	Hertz Global Holdings	ADIG was spun off from Resideo and replaced HTZ which was no longer representative of the small-cap market space.
August 3, 2026	FIVN	Five9	TWO	Two Harbors Investment	FIVN replaced TWO after it was acquired by CrossCountry Mortgage.
July 27, 2026	VVX	V2X, Inc.	AVNS	Avanos Medical	V2X replaced AVNS after it was acquired by American Industrial Partners.
July 24, 2026	TPC	Tutor Perini	KRYS	Krystal Biotech	TPC replaced KRYS, which replaced Taylor Morrison Home Corporation in the S&P 400 after it was acquired by Berkshire Hathaway.
July 22, 2026	ROAD	Construction Partners	MOH	Molina Healthcare	ROAD replaced MOH, which replaced National Storage Affiliates Trust in the S&P 400 after it was acquired by Public Storage.
July 17, 2026	KRMN	Karman Holdings	BTSG	BrightSpring Health Services	KRMN replaced BTSG, which replaced Chart Industries in the S&P 400 after it was acquired by Baker Hughes.
July 15, 2026	SEI	Solaris Energy Infrastructure	CPRX	Catalyst Pharmaceuticals	SEI replaced CPRX after it was acquired by Angelini Pharma.
July 8, 2026	LEU	Centrus Energy	WSR	Whitestone REIT	LEU replaced WSR after it was acquired by Ares Management.
July 8, 2026	MFP	Midera Food Processing	RWT	Redwood Trust	MFP was spun off from Middleby Corp. and replaced RWT which was no longer representative of the small-cap market space.
July 6, 2026	GT	Goodyear Tire and Rubber Company	STEL	Stellar Bancorp	STEL was acquired by Prosperity Bancshares. GT was moved from the S&P 400 to replace it as it was more representative of the small cap market space.
July 1, 2026	MBGL	Mobility Global	CLB	Core Laboratories	MBGL was spun off from S&P Global and replaced CLB which was no longer representative of the small-cap market space.
July 1, 2026	GPOR	Gulfport Energy	SEM	Select Medical	GPOR replaced SEM after it was acquired by a consortium consisting of several executives of SEM and the private equity firm WCAS.
July 1, 2026	CAG	Conagra Brands	GDYN	Grid Dynamics Holdings	CAG was moved from the S&P 500 as it was more representative of the small cap market space. GDYN was removed from the S&P 600 as it was no longer representative of the small-cap market space.
July 1, 2026	NHI	National Health Investors	ARI	Apollo Commercial Real Estate Finance	NHI replaced ARI after it announced ongoing liquidation activities and was no longer appropriate for the S&P 600.
June 29, 2026	NTST	NETSTREIT	PRA	ProAssurance	NTST replaced PRA after it was acquired by The Doctors Company.
June 22, 2026	POOL	Pool Corporation	EMBC	Embecta	POOL was moved from the S&P 500 as it was more representative of the small cap market space. EMBC was removed from the S&P 600 as it was no longer representative of the small-cap market space.
June 22, 2026	CPB	Campbell's	UHT	Universal Health Realty Income Trust	CPB was moved from the S&P 500 as it was more representative of the small cap market space. UHT was removed from the S&P 600 as it was no longer representative of the small-cap market space.
June 22, 2026	COTY	Coty	SMTC	Semtech	COTY was moved from the S&P 400 as it was more representative of the small cap market space. SMTC was moved to the S&P 400 as it was more representative of the mid-cap market space.
June 22, 2026	CNXC	Concentrix	SANM	Sanmina Corporation	CNXC was moved from the S&P 400 as it was more representative of the small cap market space. SANM was moved to the S&P 400 as it was more representative of the mid-cap market space.
June 22, 2026	BLKB	Blackbaud	VIAV	Viavi Solutions	BLKB was moved from the S&P 400 as it was more representative of the small cap market space. VIAV was moved to the S&P 400 as it was more representative of the mid-cap market space.
June 22, 2026	CACC	Credit Acceptance	OXM	Oxford Industries	CACC replaced OXM as it was no longer representative of the small-cap market space.
June 22, 2026	LAZ	Lazard	GOGO	Gogo Inflight Internet	LAZ replaced GOGO as it was no longer representative of the small-cap market space.
June 22, 2026	EBC	Eastern Bankshares	PRAA	PRA Group	EBC replaced PRAA as it was no longer representative of the small-cap market space.
June 22, 2026	WSBC	WesBanco	IIIN	Insteel Industries	WSBC replaced IIIN as it was no longer representative of the small-cap market space.
June 22, 2026	WRBY	Warby Parker	ETD	Ethan Allen Interiors	WRBY replaced ETD as it was no longer representative of the small-cap market space.
June 22, 2026	NIC	Nicolet Bankshares	CTKB	Cytek Biosciences	NIC replaced CTKB as it was no longer representative of the small-cap market space.
June 22, 2026	LQDA	Liquidia	MNRO	Monro Muffler Brake	LQDA replaced MNRO as it was no longer representative of the small-cap market space.
June 22, 2026	RSI	Rush Street Interactive	VITL	Vital Farms	RSI replaced VITL as it was no longer representative of the small-cap market space.
June 22, 2026	USLM	United States Lime & Minerals	CABO	Cable One	USLM replaced CABO as it was no longer representative of the small-cap market space.
June 22, 2026	IVT	InvenTrust Properties	FWRD	Forward Air	IVT replaced FWRD as it was no longer representative of the small-cap market space.
June 16, 2026	FA	First Advantage	KW	Kennedy Wilson	FA replaced KW after it was acquired by consortium led by KW's CEO, William J. McMorrow, with Fairfax Financial.
June 9, 2026	DMC	Del Monte Corporation	FDP	Fresh Del Monte Produce Inc.	DMC replaced FDP reflecting Fresh Del Monte Produce Inc. being renamed to Del Monte Corporation
June 2, 2026	EPAM	EPAM Systems	SSTK	Shutterstock	EPAM was moved from the S&P 500 as it was more representative of the small cap market space. SSTK was removed from the S&P 600 as it was merged with Getty Images.
June 1, 2026	DAVE	Dave	AMWD	American Woodmark	DAVE replaced AMWD after it was acquired by MasterBrand Inc.
May 27, 2026	UTI	Universal Technical Institute	VRE	Veris Residential	UTI replaced VRE after it was acquired by Affinius Capital and Vista Hill Partners.
May 18, 2026	PTON	Peloton Interactive	NVRI	Enviri	PTON replaced NVRI after it spun off assets into a new publicly traded company. The new publicly traded company was not representative of the small-cap market space.
May 19, 2026	FG	F&G	MCW	Mister Car Wash	FG replaced MCW after it was acquired by Leonard Green & Partners.
May 18, 2026	FLO	Flowers Foods	CSGS	CSG Systems	FLO replaced CSGS after it was acquired by NEC.
May 14, 2026	ALHC	Alignment Healthcare	SNCY	Sun Country Airlines	ALHC replaced SNCY after it was acquired by Allegiant Travel Company.
May 14, 2026	BFAM	Bright Horizons	TPH	Tri Pointe Homes	BFAM replaced TPH after it was acquired by Sumitomo Forestry.
May 14, 2026	RELY	Remitly	APLS	Apellis Pharmaceuticals	RELY replaced APLS after it was acquired by Biogen.
May 8, 2026	AGNT	eXp World Holdings, Inc.	EXPI	eXp World Holdings, Inc.	EXPI now trages under symbol AGNT after coprorate rebrand.
May 1, 2026	LFST	Lifestance Health	GDEN	Golden Entertainment	LFST replaced GDEN after it was acquired by Vici Properties and Blake L. Sartini.
April 24, 2026	EFOR	Everforth Inc.	ASGN	ASGN Inc.	ASGN now trades under symbol EFOR after corporate rebrand.
April 10, 2026	DBD	Diebold Nixdorf	SEE	Sealed Air	DBD replaced SEE after it was acquired by Clayton, Dubilier & Rice.
April 9, 2026	BNL	Broadstone Net Lease	DOCN	DigitalOcean	BNL replaced DOCN, which replaced Casey's in the S&P 400 after it was moved to the S&P 500.
April 9, 2026	ATMU	Atmus Filtration Technologies	AL	Air Lease Corporation	ATMU replaced AL after it was acquired by Sumitomo Corporation.
April 2, 2026	VGNT	Versigent	TWI	Titan International, Inc.	VGNT was spun off from Aptiv and replaced TWI which was no longer representative of the small-cap market space.
March 25, 2026	COCO	Vita Coco	TGNA	Tegna Inc.	COCO replaced TGNA after it was acquired by Nexstar Media Group.
March 23, 2026	MTCH	Match Group	SOLS	Solstice Advanced Materials	MTCH was moved from the S&P 500 as it was more representative of the small cap market space. SOLS was moved to the S&P 400 as it was more representative of the mid-cap market space.
March 23, 2026	MOH	Molina Healthcare	SITM	SiTime	MOH was moved from the S&P 500 as it was more representative of the small cap market space. SITM was moved to the S&P 400 as it was more representative of the mid-cap market space.
March 23, 2026	LW	Lamb Weston	MOG.A	Moog Inc.	LW was moved from the S&P 500 as it was more representative of the small cap market space. MOG.A was moved to the S&P 400 as it was more representative of the mid-cap market space.
March 23, 2026	PAYC	Paycom	IDCC	InterDigital	PAYC was moved from the S&P 500 as it was more representative of the small cap market space. IDCC was moved to the S&P 400 as it was more representative of the mid-cap market space.
March 23, 2026	VSEC	VSE Corporation	VICR	Vicor Corporation	VSEC replaced VICR after it was moved to the S&P 400.
March 23, 2026	AGX	Argan	CTRE	CareTrust REIT	AGX replaced CTRE after it was moved to the S&P 400.
March 23, 2026	RITM	Rithm Capital	PLAY	Dave & Buster's	RITM replaced PLAY as it was no longer representative of the small-cap market space.
March 23, 2026	LYFT	Lyft	SXC	SunCoke Energy	LYFT replaced SXC as it was no longer representative of the small-cap market space.
March 23, 2026	LAUR	Laureate Education	AHRT	AH Realty Trust	LAUR replaced AHRT as it was no longer representative of the small-cap market space.
March 23, 2026	LTH	Life Time Group Holdings	INN	Summit Hotel Properties	LTH replaced INN as it was no longer representative of the small-cap market space.
March 23, 2026	LIF	Life360	KREF	KKR Real Estate Finance Trust	LIF replaced KREF as it was no longer representative of the small-cap market space.
March 23, 2026	SPHR	Sphere Entertainment	BLMN	Bloomin' Brands	SPHR replaced BLMN as it was no longer representative of the small-cap market space.
March 23, 2026	GTM	ZoomInfo	MYGN	Myriad Genetics	GTM was moved from the S&P 400 as it was more representative of the small cap market space. MYGN was no longer representative of the small-cap market space.
March 23, 2026	ASGN	ASGN	CARS	Cars.com	ASGN was moved from the S&P 400 as it was more representative of the small cap market space. CARS was no longer representative of the small-cap market space.
March 23, 2026	KMPR	Kemper Corporation	ANGI	Angi Inc.	KMPR was moved from the S&P 400 as it was more representative of the small cap market space. ANGI was no longer representative of the small-cap market space.
March 13, 2026	NSSC	Napco Security Technologies	ALEX	Alexander & Baldwin	NSSC replaced ALEX after it was acquired by an investor group comprising MW Group and funds affiliated with DivcoWest and Blackstone Real Estate.
February 12, 2026	RNG	RingCentral	HI	Hillenbrand	RNG replaced HI after it was acquired by Lone Star Funds.
February 11, 2026	MBIN	Merchants Bancorp	THS	TreeHouse Foods	MBIN replaced THS after it was acquired by Investindustrial S.A.
February 10, 2026	OSW	OneSpaWorld Holdings	DVAX	Dynavax Technologies	OSW replaced DVAX after it was acquired by Sanofi.
February 9, 2026	ADT	ADT Inc.	ARWR	Arrowhead Pharmaceuticals	ADT replaced ARWR, which replaced Ciena in the S&P 400 after it was moved to the S&P 500.
February 2, 2026	LZ	LegalZoom	ELME	Elme Communities	LZ replaced ELME after ELME announced ongoing liquidation activities and was no longer appropriate for the S&P 600.
February 2, 2026	APLS	Apellis Pharmaceuticals	AEIS	Advanced Energy	APLS replaced AEIS, which replaced Comerica in the S&P 400 after it was acquired by Fifth Third Bank.
January 30, 2026	AMRX	Amneal Pharmaceuticals	TTMI	TTM Technologies	AMRX replaced TTMI, which replaced Civitas Resources in the S&P 400 after it was acquired by SM Energy.
January 26, 2026	WINA	Winmark	GES	Guess, Inc.	WINA replaced GES after it was acquired by Authentic Brands Group and the Rolling Stockholders.
January 7, 2026	VSNT	Versant Media Group	BDN	Brandywine Realty Trust	VSNT was spun off from Comcast and replaced BDN which was no longer representative of the small-cap market space.
December 26, 2025	OPLN	OPENLANE, Inc.	KAR	OPENLANE, Inc.	Ticker symbol for OPENLANE, Inc. changed from KAR to OPLN.
December 22, 2025	PRIM	Primoris Services Corporation	SPXC	SPX Corporation	PRIM replaced SPXC, which replaced Comfort Systems USA in the S&P 400 after it was moved to the S&P 500.
December 22, 2025	UA/UAA	Under Armour (Class A & C)	DY	Dycom Industries	UA/UAA were moved from the S&P 400 as they were more representative of the small cap market space. DY was moved to the S&P 400 as it was more representative of the mid-cap market space.
December 22, 2025	POWI	Power Integrations	HL	Hecla Mining	POWI was moved from the S&P 400 as it was more representative of the small cap market space. HL was moved to the S&P 400 as it was more representative of the mid-cap market space.
December 22, 2025	PRGO	Perrigo	RC	Ready Capital Corp	PRGO was moved from the S&P 400 as it was more representative of the small cap market space. RC was moved from the S&P 600 as it was no longer representative of the small cap market space.
December 22, 2025	IRDM	Iridium Communications	SITC	SITE Centers	IRDM was moved from the S&P 400 as it was more representative of the small cap market space. SITC was moved from the S&P 600 as it was no longer representative of the small cap market space.
December 22, 2025	VAC	Marriott Vacations Worldwide	THRY	Thryv	VAC was moved from the S&P 400 as it was more representative of the small cap market space. THRY was moved from the S&P 600 as it was no longer representative of the small cap market space.
December 22, 2025	NSP	Insperity	HELE	Helen of Troy Limited	NSP was moved from the S&P 400 as it was more representative of the small cap market space. HELE was moved from the S&P 600 as it was no longer representative of the small cap market space.
December 22, 2025	CWST	Casella Waste Systems	ASIX	AdvanSix	CWST replaced ASIX as it was no longer representative of the small-cap market space.
December 22, 2025	INDV	Indivior	RGR	Sturm, Ruger & Co.	INDV replaced RGR as it was no longer representative of the small-cap market space.
December 22, 2025	HE	Hawaiian Electric Industries	MGPI	MGP Ingredients	HE replaced MGPI as it was no longer representative of the small-cap market space.
December 22, 2025	LKQ	LKQ Corporation	BWA	BorgWarner	LKQ was moved from the S&P 500 as it was more representative of the small cap market space. BWA was moved to the S&P 400 as it was more representative of the mid-cap market space.
December 22, 2025	SOLS	Solstice Advanced Materials	CEVA	CEVA, Inc.	SOLS was moved from the S&P 500 as it was more representative of the small cap market space. CEVA was moved from the S&P 600 as it was no longer representative of the small cap market space.
December 22, 2025	MHK	Mohawk Industries	SCVL	Shoe Carnival	MHK was moved from the S&P 500 as it was more representative of the small cap market space. SCVL was moved from the S&P 600 as it was no longer representative of the small cap market space.
December 15, 2025	SEZL	Sezzle	VTLE	Vital Energy	SEZL replaced VTLE after it was acquired by Crescent Energy.
December 11, 2025	VITL	Vital Farms	HSII	Heidrick & Struggles International	VITL replaced HSII after it was acquired by Advent International and Corvex Private Equity.
December 2, 2025	FIBK	First Interstate BancSystem	HBI	Hanesbrands	FIBK replaced HBI after it was acquired by Gildan.
November 28, 2025	PTCT	PTC Therapeutics	SNDK	SanDisk	PTCT replaced SNDK, which replaced The Interpublic Group of Companies in the S&P 500 after it was acquired by Omnicom Group.
November 28, 2025	UPWK	Upwork	PINC	Premier	UPWK replaced PINC after it was acquired by Patient Square Capital.
November 13, 2025	RRR	Red Rock Resorts, Inc.	STRL	Sterling Infrastructure	RRR replaced STRL, which replaced Light & Wonder in the S&P 400 after it planned to delist from the Nasdaq Stock Market.
November 4, 2025	EMN	Eastman Chemical Company	CAL	Caleres	EMN was moved from the S&P 500 as it was more representative of the small cap market space. CAL was removed from the S&P 600 as it was no longer representative of the small-cap market space.
October 31, 2025	KMX	CarMax	USNA	USANA Health Sciences	KMX was moved from the S&P 500 as it was more representative of the small cap market space. USNA was removed from the S&P 600 as it was no longer representative of the small-cap market space.
October 20, 2025	BTSG	BrightSpring Health Services	VBTX	Veritex Holdings	BTSG replaced VBTX after it was acquired by Huntington Bancshares.
October 6, 2025	WU	Western Union	COOP	Mr. Cooper	COOP was acquired by Rocket Companies. WU was moved from the S&P 400 to replace it as it was more representative of the small cap market space.
September 26, 2025	ACMR	ACM Research	KLG	WK Kellogg Co	ACMR replaced KLG after it was acquired by Ferrero.
September 24, 2025	REYN	Reynolds Consumer Products	SPTN	SpartanNash	REYN replaced SPTN after it was acquired by C&S Wholesale Grocers.
September 22, 2025	HL	Hecla Mining	SLP	Simulations Plus	HL replaced SLP as it was no longer representative of the small-cap market space.
September 22, 2025	WAY	Waystar Holding	JACK	Jack in the Box	WAY replaced JACK as it was no longer representative of the small-cap market space.
September 22, 2025	QTWO	Q2 Holdings	BGS	B&G Foods	QTWO replaced BGS as it was no longer representative of the small-cap market space.
September 22, 2025	NE	Noble Corporation	OMI	Owens & Minor	NE replaced OMI as it was no longer representative of the small-cap market space.
September 22, 2025	MAN	ManpowerGroup	MLAB	Mesa Laboratories	MAN was moved from the S&P 400 as it was more representative of the small cap market space. MLAB was removed from the S&P 600 as it was no longer representative of the small-cap market space.
September 22, 2025	ACHC	Acadia Healthcare	TTGT	Techtarget	ACHC was moved from the S&P 400 as it was more representative of the small cap market space. TTGT was removed from the S&P 600 as it was no longer representative of the small-cap market space.
September 22, 2025	WEN	The Wendy's Company	XRX	Xerox	WEN was moved from the S&P 400 as it was more representative of the small cap market space. XRX was removed from the S&P 600 as it was no longer representative of the small-cap market space.
September 22, 2025	ENPH	Enphase Energy	PUMP	ProPetro Holding	ENPH was moved from the S&P 500 as it was more representative of the small cap market space. PUMP was removed from the S&P 600 as it was no longer representative of the small-cap market space.
September 22, 2025	CZR	Caesars Entertainment	KTOS	Kratos Defense & Security Solutions	CZR was moved from the S&P 500 as it was more representative of the small cap market space. KTOS was moved to the S&P 400 as it was more representative of the mid-cap market space.
September 22, 2025	MKTX	MarketAxess	MP	MP Materials	MKTX was moved from the S&P 500 as it was more representative of the small cap market space. MP was moved to the S&P 400 as it was more representative of the mid-cap market space.
September 9, 2025	MIR	Mirion Technologies	GMS	GMS, Inc.	MIR replaced GMS after it was acquired by Home Depot.
September 8, 2025	PRKS	United Parks & Resorts	FL	Foot Locker	PRKS replaced FL after it was acquired by Dick's Sporting Goods.
September 2, 2025	ADAM	Adamas Trust, Inc.	NYMT	New York Mortgage Trust, Inc.	NYMT now trades under symbol ADAM after corporate rebrand.
September 2, 2025	BHLB	Berkshire Hills Bancorp	BBT	Beacon Financial Corp.	BHLB acquired Brookline Bancorp. Post merger, BHLB remained in the S&P 600 with a name change to Beacon Financial Corp and ticker change to BBT.
September 2, 2025	SRPT	Sarepta Therapeutics	BRKL	Brookline Bancorp	BRKL was acquired by Berkshire Hills Bancorp. SRPT was moved from the S&P 400 to replace it as it was more representative of the small cap market space.
September 2, 2025	KNTK	Kinetik Holdings	PPBI	Pacific Premier Bancorp	KNTK replaced PPBI after it was acquired by Columbia Banking System, Inc.
August 6, 2025	KGS	Kodiak Gas Services	NVEE	NV5 Global	KGS replaced NVEE after it was acquired by Acuren Corporation.
July 29, 2025	VCYT	Veracyte	TGI	Triumph Group	VCYT replaced TGI after it was acquired by Warburg Pincus and Berkshire Partners.
July 18, 2025	VCTR	Victory Capital	AVAV	AeroVironment	VCTR replaced AVAV, which replaced ChampionX in the S&P 400 after it was acquired by Schlumberger.
July 1, 2025	RAL	Ralliant Corp	WOLF	Wolfspeed	RAL replaced WOLF after it announced its intention to file for bankruptcy and was therefore no longer eligible for continued inclusion in the S&P 600. RAL was spun off from Fortive Corp. which will remain in the S&P 500.
June 6, 2025	HTO	H2O America	SJW	San Jose Water Group	San Jose Water Group (SJW) rebranded as H2O America (HTO).
April 17, 2025	STRL	Sterling Infrastructure	PDCO	Patterson Companies	STRL replaced PDCO after it was acquired by Patient Square Capital.
April 16, 2025	ACT	Enact Holdings	SWI	SolarWinds	ACT replaced SWI after it was acquired by Turn/River Capital.
April 2, 2025	ANGI	Angi Inc.	ODP	The ODP Corporation	ANGI was spun off from IAC Inc. and replaced ODP which was no longer representative of the small-cap market space.
March 24, 2025	TFX	Teleflex	VFC	VF Corporation	TFX was moved from the S&P 500 as it was more representative of the small cap market space. VFC was moved to the S&P 400 as it was more representative of the mid-cap market space.
March 24, 2025	CE	Celanese	ALK	Alaska Air Group	CE was moved from the S&P 500 as it was more representative of the small cap market space. ALK was moved to the S&P 400 as it was more representative of the mid-cap market space.
March 24, 2025	FMC	FMC Corporation	HIMS	Hims & Hers Health	FMC was moved from the S&P 500 as it was more representative of the small cap market space. HIMS was moved to the S&P 400 as it was more representative of the mid-cap market space.
March 24, 2025	BWA	BorgWarner	AMBC	Ambac Financial Group	BWA was moved from the S&P 500 as it was more representative of the small cap market space. AMBC was removed from the S&P 600 as it was no longer representative of the small-cap market space.
March 24, 2025	CC	Chemours	BBWI	Bath & Body Works, Inc.	CC was moved from the S&P 400 as it was more representative of the small cap market space. BBWI was moved to the S&P 400 as it was more representative of the mid-cap market space.
March 24, 2025	TDC	Teradata	ATI	ATI Inc.	TDC was moved from the S&P 400 as it was more representative of the small cap market space. ATI was moved to the S&P 400 as it was more representative of the mid-cap market space.
March 24, 2025	NEOG	Neogen	SATS	EchoStar	NEOG was moved from the S&P 400 as it was more representative of the small cap market space. SATS was moved to the S&P 400 as it was more representative of the mid-cap market space.
March 24, 2025	RHP	Ryman Hospitality Properties	WNC	Wabash National	RHP replaced WNC as it was no longer representative of the small-cap market space.
March 24, 2025	ESI	Element Solutions	GDOT	Green Dot Corporation	ESI replaced GDOT as it was no longer representative of the small-cap market space.
March 24, 2025	FRPT	Freshpet	FLGT	Fulgent Genetics	FRPT replaced FLGT as it was no longer representative of the small-cap market space.
March 24, 2025	WSC	WillScot Holdings Corp.	NBR	Nabors Industries	WSC replaced NBR as it was no longer representative of the small-cap market space.
March 24, 2025	MWA	Mueller Water Products	GPRE	Green Plains Inc.	MWA replaced GPRE as it was no longer representative of the small-cap market space.
March 24, 2025	KTOS	Kratos Defense & Security Solutions	MATV	Mativ Holdings	KTOS replaced MATV as it was no longer representative of the small-cap market space.
March 24, 2025	CLSK	CleanSpark	HAIN	Hain Celestial Group	CLSK replaced HAIN as it was no longer representative of the small-cap market space.
February 25, 2025	SNDK	SanDisk	LESL	Leslie's	SNDK was spun off from Western Digital and replaced LESL which was no longer representative of the small-cap market space.
February 19, 2025	KAI	Kadant	NARI	Inari Medical	KAI replaced NARI after it was acquired by Stryker Corporation.
February 13, 2025	GOLF	Acushnet Company	ROIC	Retail Opportunity Investments	GOLF replaced ROIC after it was acquired by Blackstone Inc.
February 10, 2025	MRP	Millrose Properties	IRWD	Ironwood Pharmaceuticals	MRP was spun off from Lennar and replaced IRWD which was no longer representative of the small-cap market space.
January 27, 2025	ARWR	Arrowhead Pharmaceuticals	B	Barnes Group	B was acquired by Apollo Global Management. ARWR was moved from the S&P 400 to replace it as it was more representative of the small cap market space.
January 14, 2025	ENOV	Enovis	ARCH	Arch Resources	ARCH was acquired by Consol Energy. Following completion of the merger, Consol Energy will be renamed Core Natural Resources Inc., and its ticker will change to CNR. ENOV was moved from the S&P 400 to replace it as it was more representative of the small cap market space.
January 3, 2025	JBTM	JBT Marel Corporation	JBT	John Bean Technologies Corporation	John Bean Technologies (JBT) acquired Marel and began trading under new symbol JBTM.
January 3, 2025	ACAD	Acadia Pharmaceuticals	IBTX	Independent Bank Group	ACAD replaced IBTX after it was acquired by SouthState Bank.
January 2, 2025	GDYN	Grid Dynamics Holdings	GEAR	Revelyst	GDYN replaced GEAR after it was acquired by Strategic Value Partners.
December 30, 2024	INSW	International Seaways	CNSL	Consolidated Communications	INSW replaced CNSL after it was acquired by British Columbia Investment Management Corporation and Searchlight Capital.
December 23, 2024	QRVO	Qorvo	KELYA	Kelly Services	QRVO was moved from the S&P 500 as it was more representative of the small cap market space. KELYA was removed from the S&P 600 as it was no longer representative of the small-cap market space.
December 23, 2024	AMTM	Amentum	SVC	Service Properties Trust	AMTM was moved from the S&P 500 as it was more representative of the small cap market space. SVC was removed from the S&P 600 as it was no longer representative of the small-cap market space.
December 23, 2024	VSH	Vishay Intertechnology	CMA	Comerica	VSH was moved from the S&P 400 as it was more representative of the small cap market space. CMA was moved to the S&P 400 as it was more representative of the mid-cap market space.
December 23, 2024	CRI	Carter's	CRS	Carpenter Technology	CRI was moved from the S&P 400 as it was more representative of the small cap market space. CRS was moved to the S&P 400 as it was more representative of the mid-cap market space.
December 23, 2024	TRNO	Terreno Realty	HPP	Hudson Pacific Properties	TRNO replaced HPP as it was no longer representative of the small-cap market space.
December 23, 2024	SKY	Champion Homes	RGNX	REGENXBIO	SKY replaced RGNX as it was no longer representative of the small-cap market space.
November 27, 2024	CON	Concentra Group Holdings	MYE	Myers Industries	CON replaced MYE as it was no longer representative of the small-cap market space.
November 26, 2024	AESI	Atlas Energy Solutions	MLI	Mueller Industries	AESI replaced MLI, which replaced Texas Pacific Land Corporation in the S&P 400 after it was moved to the S&P 500.
November 25, 2024	DFH	Dream Finders Homes	HAYN	Haynes International	DFH replaced HAYN after it was acquired by Acerinox.
November 25, 2024	AZTA	Azenta	ENV	Envestnet	ENV was acquired by Bain Capital. AZTA was moved from the S&P 400 to replace it as it was more representative of the small cap market space.
November 4, 2024	ECG	Everus Construction Group	CLW	Clearwater Paper Corporation	ECG was spun off from MDU Resources and replaced CLW which was no longer representative of the small-cap market space.
October 15, 2024	PENG	Penguin Solutions, Inc.	SGH	Smart Global Holdings, Inc.	Smart Global Holdings (SGH) rebranded as Penguin Solutions (PENG).
October 11, 2024	MDU	MDU Resources	CHUY	Chuy's	CHUY was acquired by Darden Restaurants. MDU was moved from the S&P 400 to replace it as it announced its intention to spin-off a company at a later date.
October 9, 2024	HIMS	Hims & Hers Health	VGR	Vector Group	HIMS replaced VGR after it was acquired by JT Group.
October 4, 2024	CRGY	Crescent Energy Company	PRFT	Perficient	CRGY replaced PRFT after it was acquired by EQT AB.
October 1, 2024	CURB	Curbline Properties	CCRN	Cross Country Healthcare	CURB was spun off from SITE Centers and replaced CCRN which was no longer representative of the small-cap market space.
October 1, 2024	TMDX	TransMedics Group	ENSG	Ensign Group	TMDX replaced ENSG, which replaced Southwestern Energy in the S&P 400 after it was acquired by Chesapeake Energy.
October 1, 2024	BBWI	Bath & Body Works, Inc.	MOV	Movado	BBWI was moved from the S&P 500 as it was more representative of the small cap market space. MOV was removed from the S&P 600 as it was no longer representative of the small-cap market space.
September 23, 2024	ETSY	Etsy	HVT	Havertys	ETSY was moved from the S&P 500 as it was more representative of the small cap market space. HVT was removed from the S&P 600 as it was no longer representative of the small-cap market space.
September 23, 2024	TGNA	Tegna Inc.	DBI	Designer Brands	TGNA was moved from the S&P 400 as it was more representative of the small cap market space. DBI was removed from the S&P 600 as it was no longer representative of the small-cap market space.
September 23, 2024	ZD	Ziff Davis	FN	Fabrinet	ZD was moved from the S&P 400 as it was more representative of the small cap market space. FN was moved to the S&P 400 as it was more representative of the mid-cap market space.
September 23, 2024	MP	MP Materials	CVGW	Calavo Growers, Inc.	MP was moved from the S&P 400 as it was more representative of the small cap market space. CVGW was removed from the S&P 600 as it was no longer representative of the small-cap market space.
September 23, 2024	PGNY	Progyny	EHAB	Enhabit	PGNY was moved from the S&P 400 as it was more representative of the small cap market space. EHAB was removed from the S&P 600 as it was no longer representative of the small-cap market space.
September 23, 2024	ADNT	Adient	MERC	Mercer International	ADNT was moved from the S&P 400 as it was more representative of the small cap market space. MERC was removed from the S&P 600 as it was no longer representative of the small-cap market space.
September 23, 2024	WOLF	Wolfspeed	CMP	Compass Minerals	WOLF was moved from the S&P 400 as it was more representative of the small cap market space. CMP was removed from the S&P 600 as it was no longer representative of the small-cap market space.
September 23, 2024	HELE	Helen of Troy Limited	DDD	3D Systems Corporation	HELE was moved from the S&P 400 as it was more representative of the small cap market space. DDD was removed from the S&P 600 as it was no longer representative of the small-cap market space.
September 23, 2024	ZWS	Zurn Elkay Water Solutions	CHCT	Community Healthcare Trust	ZWS replaced CHCT as it was no longer representative of the small-cap market space.
September 23, 2024	YOU	Clear Secure	VREX	Varex Imaging	YOU replaced VREX as it was no longer representative of the small-cap market space.
September 23, 2024	TGTX	TG Therapeutics	DIN	Dine Brands Global	TGTX replaced DIN as it was no longer representative of the small-cap market space.
September 23, 2024	INSP	Inspire Medical Systems	NUS	Nu Skin Enterprises	INSP replaced NUS as it was no longer representative of the small-cap market space.
September 23, 2024	CSW	CSW Industrials	AMCX	AMC Networks	CSW replaced AMCX as it was no longer representative of the small-cap market space.
September 23, 2024	ADMA	ADMA Biologics	ZEUS	Olympic Steel	ADMA replaced ZEUS as it was no longer representative of the small-cap market space.
September 23, 2024	PI	Impinj	RILY	B. Riley Financial	PI replaced RILY as it was no longer representative of the small-cap market space.
September 6, 2024	INVX	Innovex International, Inc.	DRQ	Dril-Quip, Inc.	Dril-Quip (DRQ) merged with Innovex and began trading under symbol INVX.
August 9, 2024	SWI	SolarWinds	SPWR	SunPower	SWI replaced SPWR after it filed for Chapter 11 bankruptcy and is no longer eligible for continued inclusion in the S&P 600.
July 31, 2024	SNDR	Schneider National	SLCA	U.S. Silica Holdings	SNDR replaced SLCA after it was acquired by Apollo Global Management.
July 26, 2024	QDEL	QuidelOrtho	HIBB	Hibbett Sports	HIBB was acquired by JD Sports. QDEL was moved from the S&P 400 to replace it as it was more representative of the small cap market space.
July 22, 2024	GTES	Gates Corporation	ANF	Abercrombie & Fitch Company	GTES replaced ANF, which replaced Equitrans Midstream in the S&P 400 after it was acquired by EQT Corporation.
July 3, 2024	PTGX	Protagonist Therapeutics	WIRE	Encore Wire Corporation	PTGX replaced WIRE after it was acquired by Prysmian Group.
June 24, 2024	CMA	Comerica	ADTN	ADTRAN	CMA was moved from the S&P 500 as it was more representative of the small cap market space. ADTN was removed from the S&P 600 as it was no longer representative of the small-cap market space.
June 24, 2024	RHI	Robert Half	HOUS	Anywhere Real Estate	RHI was moved from the S&P 500 as it was more representative of the small cap market space. HOUS was removed from the S&P 600 as it was no longer representative of the small-cap market space.
June 24, 2024	LEG	Leggett & Platt	MEI	Methode Electronics	LEG was moved from the S&P 400 as it was more representative of the small cap market space. MEI was removed from the S&P 600 as it was no longer representative of the small-cap market space.
June 24, 2024	HTZ	Hertz	CLDT	Chatham Lodging Trust	HTZ was moved from the S&P 400 as it was more representative of the small cap market space. CLDT was removed from the S&P 600 as it was no longer representative of the small-cap market space.
June 24, 2024	GO	Grocery Outlet	NFBK	Northfield Bancorp,	GO was moved from the S&P 400 as it was more representative of the small cap market space. NFBK was removed from the S&P 600 as it was no longer representative of the small-cap market space.
June 24, 2024	PENN	Penn Entertainment	XPER	Xperi	PENN was moved from the S&P 400 as it was more representative of the small cap market space. XPER was removed from the S&P 600 as it was no longer representative of the small-cap market space.
June 24, 2024	IART	Integra Lifesciences	RGP	Resources Connection	IART was moved from the S&P 400 as it was more representative of the small cap market space. RGP was removed from the S&P 600 as it was no longer representative of the small-cap market space.
June 24, 2024	WERN	Werner Enterprises	ATNI	ATN International	WERN was moved from the S&P 400 as it was more representative of the small cap market space. ATNI was removed from the S&P 600 as it was no longer representative of the small-cap market space.
June 24, 2024	KRYS	Krystal Biotech	OSUR	OraSure Technologies	KRYS replaced OSUR as it was no longer representative of the small-cap market space.
June 24, 2024	VIRT	Virtu Financial	MCS	Marcus Corporation	VIRT replaced MCS as it was no longer representative of the small-cap market space.
June 24, 2024	STEP	StepStone Group	TTEC	TTEC Holdings	STEP replaced TTEC as it was no longer representative of the small-cap market space.
June 24, 2024	WHD	Cactus	MED	Medifast	WHD replaced MED as it was no longer representative of the small-cap market space.
June 24, 2024	TDW	Tidewate	CRNC	Cerence	TDW replaced CRNC as it was no longer representative of the small-cap market space.
May 8, 2024	MARA	Marathon Digital	AAON	AAON	MARA replaced AAON, which replaced Vistra Corp in the S&P 400 after it was moved to the S&P 500.
May 7, 2024	DOCN	DigitalOcean	AGTI	Agiliti	DOCN replaced AGTI after it was acquired by Thomas H. Lee Partners.
May 6, 2024	IAC	IAC Inc.	AEL	American Equity Investment Life Holding Co.	IAC replaced AEL after it was acquired by Brookfield Reinsurance.
April 23, 2024	CNS	Cohen & Steers	KAMN	Kaman Corporation	CNS replaced KAMN after it was acquired by Arcline Investment Management.
April 22, 2024	CABO	Cable One	MDC	MDC Holdings	MDC was acquired by Sekisui House. CABO was moved from the S&P 400 to replace it as it was more representative of the small cap market space.
April 3, 2024	VFC	VF Corporation	MODV	ModivCare	VFC was moved from the S&P 500 as it was more representative of the small cap market space. MODV was removed from the S&P 600 as it was no longer representative of the small-cap market space.
April 3, 2024	FOXF	Fox Factory	SSP	E. W. Scripps Company	FOXF was moved from the S&P 400 as it was more representative of the small cap market space. SSP was removed from the S&P 600 as it was no longer representative of the small-cap market space.
April 1, 2024	RUN	Sunrun	PGTI	PGT Innovations	PGTI was acquired by MITER Brands. RUN was moved from the S&P 400 to replace it as it was more representative of the small cap market space.
April 1, 2024	NARI	Inari Medical	CPE	Callon Petroleum	CPE was acquired by APA Corporation. NARI was moved from the S&P 400 to replace it as it was more representative of the small cap market space.
March 18, 2024	CALX	Calix, Inc.	CYTK	Cytokinetics	CALX was moved from the S&P 400 as it was more representative of the small cap market space. CYTK was moved to the S&P 400 as it was more representative of the mid-cap market space.
March 18, 2024	MPW	Medical Properties Trust	AIT	Applied Industrial Technologies	MPW was moved from the S&P 400 as it was more representative of the small cap market space. AIT was moved to the S&P 400 as it was more representative of the mid-cap market space.
March 18, 2024	MGY	Magnolia Oil & Gas	CRMT	Americas Carmart	MGY replaced CRMT as it was no longer representative of the small-cap market space.
March 18, 2024	AL	Air Lease Corporation	TBI	TrueBlue	AL replaced TBI as it was no longer representative of the small-cap market space.
March 18, 2024	BOX	Box, Inc.	FORR	Forrester Research	BOX replaced FORR as it was no longer representative of the small-cap market space.
March 18, 2024	BGC	BGC Group	OIS	Oil States International	BGC replaced OIS as it was no longer representative of the small-cap market space.
March 18, 2024	BL	BlackLine Systems	APPS	Digital Turbine	BL replaced APPS as it was no longer representative of the small-cap market space.
March 18, 2024	ARCH	Arch Resources	CCSI	Consensus Cloud Solutions	ARCH replaced CCSI as it was no longer representative of the small-cap market space.
March 18, 2024	MGEE	MGE Energy	IRBT	iRobot	MGEE replaced IRBT as it was no longer representative of the small-cap market space.
March 4, 2024	CXM	Sprinklr	MDRX	Veradigm	CXM replaced MDRX after it was suspended from the Nasdaq Stock Market due to non-compliance with listing rules and is no longer eligible for continued inclusion in the S&P 600.
January 23, 2024	BTU	Peabody Energy	ELF	e.l.f. Beauty, Inc.	BTU replaced ELF, which replaced Spirit Realty Capital in the S&P 400 after it was acquired by Realty Income.
January 5, 2024	PDCO	Patterson Companies	CHS	Chico's FAS	CHS was acquired by Sycamore Partners. PDCO was moved from the S&P 400 to replace it as it was more representative of the small cap market space.
January 2, 2024	SATS	EchoStar	DISH	Dish Network	SATS replaced DISH after it acquired the company.
January 2, 2024	VYX	NCR Voyix	LTHM	Livent Corp.	LTHM was merged with Allkem. The combined company, renamed Arcadium Lithium, will have a projected total market capitalization that is more representative of the mid-cap market space. VYX was moved from the S&P 400 to replace it as it was more representative of the small cap market space.
January 2, 2024	RUSHA	Rush Enterprises	RPT	RPT Realty	RUSHA replaced RPT after it was acquired by Kimco Realty.
December 18, 2023	SEE	Sealed Air	OFIX	Orthofix Medical	SEE was moved from the S&P 500 as it was more representative of the small cap market space. OFIX was moved to the S&P 400 as it was more representative of the mid-cap market space.
December 18, 2023	ALSK	Alaska Air Group	RMBS	Rambus	ALSK was moved from the S&P 500 as it was more representative of the small cap market space. RMBS was moved to the S&P 400 as it was more representative of the mid-cap market space.
December 18, 2023	SEDG	SolarEdge	FIX	Comfort Systems USA	SEDG was moved from the S&P 500 as it was more representative of the small cap market space. FIX was removed from the S&P 600 as it was no longer representative of the small-cap market space.
December 18, 2023	MODG	Topgolf Callaway Brands	CLFD	Clearfield	MODG was moved from the S&P 400 as it was more representative of the small cap market space. CLFD was removed from the S&P 600 as it was no longer representative of the small-cap market space.
December 18, 2023	VSTS	Vestis	OSPN	OneSpan	VSTS was moved from the S&P 400 as it was more representative of the small cap market space. OSPN was removed from the S&P 600 as it was no longer representative of the small-cap market space.
December 18, 2023	ALKS	Alkermes	CYH	Community Health Systems, Inc.	ALKS replaced CYH as it was no longer representative of the small-cap market space.
December 18, 2023	AWI	Armstrong World Industries	IVR	Invesco Mortgage Capital	AWI replaced IVR as it was no longer representative of the small-cap market space.
December 18, 2023	NHC	National Healthcare	CDMO	Avid Bioservices	NHC replaced CDMO as it was no longer representative of the small-cap market space.
December 18, 2023	PJT	PJT Partners	JRVR	James River Group Holdings	PJT replaced JRVR as it was no longer representative of the small-cap market space.
December 4, 2023	WS	Worthington Steel	SNBR	Sleep Number	WS was spun off from Worthington Industries, and replaced SNBR which was no longer representative of the small-cap market space. Post spin-off Worthington Industries was renamed Worthington Enterprises.
November 30, 2023	CWEN, CWEN.A	Clearway, Inc.	VRTV	Veritiv	CWEN replaced VRTV after it was acquired by Clayton, Dubilier & Rice.
November 30, 2023	WOR	Worthington Industries	AVTA	Avantax	AVTA was acquired by Aretec Group, Inc. WOR was moved from the S&P 400 to replace it as it was more representative of the small cap market space.
November 30, 2023	ICUI	ICU Medical	PACW	PacWest Bancorp	PACW was acquired by Banc of California. ICUI was moved from the S&P 400 to replace it as it was more representative of the small cap market space.
November 13, 2023	ACIW	ACI Worldwide	NXGN	NextGen Healthcare	NXGN was acquired by Thoma Bravo. ACIW was moved from the S&P 400 to replace it as it was more representative of the small cap market space.
November 10, 2023	AMR	Alpha Metallurgical Resources	AVID	Avid Technology	AMR replaced AVID after it was acquired by Symphony Technology Group.
November 7, 2023	ENV	Envestnet	TWNK	Hostess Brands	TWNK was acquired by The J.M. Smucker Company. ENV was moved from the S&P 400 to replace it as it was more representative of the small cap market space.
October 20, 2023	VICR	Vicor Corporation	CIR	CIRCOR International	CIR was acquired by KKR & Co. Inc. VICR was moved from the S&P 400 to replace it as it was more representative of the small cap market space.
October 18, 2023	OGN	Organon & Co.	ONTO	Onto Innovation	OGN was moved from the S&P 500 as it was more representative of the small cap market space. ONTO was moved to the S&P 400 as it was more representative of the mid-cap market space.
October 18, 2023	NATL	NCR Atleos	ITOS	iTeos Therapeutics	NATL was spun off from S&P 400 constituent NCR Corporation, renamed NCR Atleos, and replaced iTeos which was no longer representative of the small-cap market space.
October 3, 2023	KLG	WK Kellogg Co	AVD	American Vanguard Corporation	KLG was spun off from S&P 500 constituent Kellogg's, renamed WK Kellogg, and replaced AVD which was no longer representative of the small-cap market space.
October 3, 2023	KSS	Kohl's	HA	Hawaiian Holdings	KSS was moved from the S&P 400 as it was more representative of the small cap market space. HA was removed from the S&P 600 as it was no longer representative of the small-cap market space.
October 3, 2023	DXC	DXC Technology	EBIX	Ebix	DXC was moved from the S&P 500 as it was more representative of the small cap market space. EBIX was removed from the S&P 600 as it was no longer representative of the small-cap market space.
September 29, 2023	HAYW	Hayward Holdings	CIVI	Civitas Resources	HAYW replaced CIVI which replaced Syneos Health in the S&P 400.
September 18, 2023	APLE	Apple Hospitality REIT	CPSI	Computer Programs and Systems	Market capitalization change.
September 18, 2023	LBRT	Liberty Energy	ZYXI	Zynex	Market capitalization change.
September 18, 2023	BXMT	Blackstone Mortgage Trust	RMAX	RE/MAX	Market capitalization change.
September 18, 2023	HASI	Hannon Armstrong	FF	FutureFuel	Market capitalization change.
September 18, 2023	JBLU	JetBlue	ONL	Orion Office REIT	Market capitalization change.
September 18, 2023	TRIP	TripAdvisor	VNDA	Vanda Pharmaceuticals	Market capitalization change.
September 18, 2023	HIW	Highwoods Properties	ANGO	AngioDynamics	Market capitalization change.
September 18, 2023	XRX	Xerox	OPI	Office Properties Income Trust	Market capitalization change.
September 18, 2023	ENR	Energizer	EGHT	8x8	Market capitalization change.
September 18, 2023	CATY	Cathay Bank	CHRS	Coherus Biosciences	Market capitalization change.
September 18, 2023	SXT	Sensient Technologies	NTGR	Netgear	Market capitalization change.
September 18, 2023	PZZA	Papa John's	AAN	Aaron's, Inc.	Market capitalization change.
September 18, 2023	OMCL	Omnicell	TSE	Trinseo	Market capitalization change.
September 18, 2023	NWL	Newell Brands	UVE	Universal Insurance Holdings	Market capitalization change.
September 18, 2023	LNC	Lincoln National	QURE	UniQure	Market capitalization change.
September 1, 2023	JXN	Jackson Financial	NEX	NexTier Oilfield Solutions	JXN replaced NEX after it was acquired by Patterson-UTI.
September 1, 2023	GSHD	Goosehead Insurance	NUVA	NuVasive	GSHD replaced NUVA after it was acquired by Globus Medical.
August 25, 2023	AAP	Advance Auto Parts	EBS	Emergent BioSolutions	AAP was moved from the S&P 500 as it was more representative of the small cap market space. EBS was removed from the S&P 600 as it was no longer representative of the small-cap market space.
August 22, 2023	STAA	Staar Surgical	UBA	Urstadt Biddle Properties	UBA was acquired by Regency Centers. STAA was moved from the S&P 400 to replace it as it was more representative of the small cap market space.
August 21, 2023	MRCY	Mercury Systems	ARNC	Arconic	ARNC was acquired by Apollo Global Management. MRCY was moved from the S&P 400 to replace it as it was more representative of the small cap market space.
August 1, 2023	MSGS	Madison Square Garden Sports	AJRD	Aerojet Rocketdyne	MSGS replaced AJRD after it was acquired by L3Harris.
July 3, 2023	FTRE	Fortrea	SENEA	Seneca Foods	FTRE was spun off from Labcorp and replaced SENEA which was no longer representative of the small-cap market space.
July 3, 2023	PHIN	PHINIA	LOCO	El Pollo Loco	PHIN was spun off from BorgWarner and replaced LOCO which was no longer representative of the small-cap market space.
June 23, 2023	ABR	Arbor Realty Trust	ROCC	Ranger Oil	ABR replaced ROCC after it was acquired by Baytex Energy.
June 19, 2023	DISH	Dish Network	CUTR	Cutera, Inc.	DISH was moved from the S&P 500 as it was more representative of the small cap market space. CUTR was removed from the S&P 600 as it was no longer representative of the small-cap market space.
June 19, 2023	NAVI	Navient	ZUMZ	Zumiez	NAVI was moved from the S&P 400 as it was more representative of the small cap market space. ZUMZ was removed from the S&P 600 as it was no longer representative of the small-cap market space.
June 19, 2023	SITM	SiTime	GCO	Genesco	SITM was moved from the S&P 400 as it was more representative of the small cap market space. GCO was removed from the S&P 600 as it was no longer representative of the small-cap market space.
June 19, 2023	MAC	Macerich	BOOM	Dynamic Materials Corporation	MAC was moved from the S&P 400 as it was more representative of the small cap market space. BOOM was removed from the S&P 600 as it was no longer representative of the small-cap market space.
June 19, 2023	VSXY	Victoria's Secret	GCI	Gannett	VSCO (now VSXY) moved from the S&P 400 as more representative of the small cap market space. GCI was removed from the S&P 600 as it was no longer representative of the small-cap market space.
June 19, 2023	DEI	Douglas Emmett	LPSN	LivePerson	DEI was moved from the S&P 400 as it was more representative of the small cap market space. LPSN was removed from the S&P 600 as it was no longer representative of the small-cap market space.
June 19, 2023	FULT	Fulton Financial Corporation	RYAM	Rayonier Advanced Materials	FULT was moved from the S&P 400 as it was more representative of the small cap market space. RYAM was removed from the S&P 600 as it was no longer representative of the small-cap market space.
June 19, 2023	NGVT	Ingevity Corp.	PLCE	The Children's Place	NGVT was moved from the S&P 400 as it was more representative of the small cap market space. PLCE was removed from the S&P 600 as it was no longer representative of the small-cap market space.
June 19, 2023	SPWR	SunPower	EGRX	Eagle Pharmaceuticals, Inc.	SPWR was moved from the S&P 400 as it was more representative of the small cap market space. EGRX was removed from the S&P 600 as it was no longer representative of the small-cap market space.
June 19, 2023	WLY	John Wiley & Sons	CMTL	Comtech Telecommunications Corp.	WLY was moved from the S&P 400 as it was more representative of the small cap market space. CMTL was removed from the S&P 600 as it was no longer representative of the small-cap market space.
June 19, 2023	DAN	Dana Incorporated	PETS	PetMed Express	DAN was moved from the S&P 400 as it was more representative of the small cap market space. PETS was removed from the S&P 600 as it was no longer representative of the small-cap market space.
June 19, 2023	UFPT	UFP Technologies	BIG	Big Lots	BIG was removed from the S&P 600 and replaced with UFPT as it was no longer representative of the small-cap market space.
June 19, 2023	SDGR	Schrödinger, Inc.	CARA	Cara Therapeutics	CARA was removed from the S&P 600 and replaced with SDGR as it was no longer representative of the small-cap market space.
June 19, 2023	PECO	Phillips Edison & Company	FARO	FARO Technologies	FARO was removed from the S&P 600 and replaced with PECO as it was no longer representative of the small-cap market space.
June 19, 2023	MC	Moelis & Company	DOUG	Douglas Elliman	DOUG was removed from the S&P 600 and replaced with MC as it was no longer representative of the small-cap market space.
June 19, 2023	CARG	CarGurus	INGN	Inogen	INGN was removed from the S&P 600 and replaced with CARG as it was no longer representative of the small-cap market space.
June 19, 2023	CRC	California Resources Corporation	TG	Tredegar Corporation	TG was removed from the S&P 600 and replaced with CRC as it was no longer representative of the small-cap market space.
June 19, 2023	APAM	Artisan Partners Asset Management	TREE	LendingTree	TREE was removed from the S&P 600 and replaced with APAM as it was no longer representative of the small-cap market space.
June 14, 2023	EXPI	eXp World Holdings	HSKA	Heska Corporation	EXPI replaced HSKA after it was acquired by Mars, Incorporated.
June 14, 2023	PRVA	Privia Health Group	RUTH	Ruth's Hospitality Group	PRVA replaced RUTH after it was acquired by Darden Restaurants.
June 1, 2023	BOH	Bank of Hawaii	HMST	HomeStreet Bank	BOH was moved from the S&P 400 as it was more representative of the small cap market space. HMST was removed from the S&P 600 as it was no longer representative of the small-cap market space.
May 1, 2023	CTKB	Cytek Biosciences	CSII	Cardiovascular Systems	CTKB replaced CSII after it was acquired by Abbott Laboratories.
April 5, 2023	PACW	PacWest Bancorp	NKTR	Nektar Therapeutics	PACW was moved from the S&P 400 as it was more representative of the small cap market space. NKTR was removed from the S&P 600 as it was no longer representative of the small-cap market space.
April 3, 2023	NABL	N-able	STAR	iStar	NABL replaced STAR after it was acquired by Safehold, Inc.
March 22, 2023	CERT	Certara	EXPO	Exponent	CERT replaced EXPO which replaced IAA, Inc. in the S&P 400 after it was acquired by Ritchie Bros. Auctioneers.
March 21, 2023	CVI	CVR Energy	AAWW	Atlas Air Worldwide Holdings	CVI replaced AAWW after it was acquired by Apollo Global Management.
March 20, 2023	LUMN	Lumen Technologies	BBBY	Bed Bath & Beyond	LUMN was moved from the S&P 500 as it was more representative of the small cap market space. BBBY was removed from the S&P 600 as it was no longer representative of the small-cap market space.
March 20, 2023	TNDM	Tandem Diabetes Care	ZIMV	ZimVie	TNDM was moved from the S&P 400 as it was more representative of the small cap market space. ZIMV was removed from the S&P 600 as it was no longer representative of the small-cap market space.
March 20, 2023	HBI	Hanesbrands	OPRX	OptimizeRx	HBI was moved from the S&P 400 as it was more representative of the small cap market space. OPRX was removed from the S&P 600 as it was no longer representative of the small-cap market space.
March 20, 2023	PEB	Pebblebrook Hotel Trust	ILPT	Industrial Logistics Properties Trust	PEB was moved from the S&P 400 as it was more representative of the small cap market space. ILPT was removed from the S&P 600 as it was no longer representative of the small-cap market space.
March 20, 2023	JBGS	JBG Smith	GPMT	Granite Point Mortgage Trust	JBGS was moved from the S&P 400 as it was more representative of the small cap market space. GPMT was removed from the S&P 600 as it was no longer representative of the small-cap market space.
March 20, 2023	KMT	Kennametal	PKE	Park Aerospace Corp	KMT was moved from the S&P 400 as it was more representative of the small cap market space. PKE was removed from the S&P 600 as it was no longer representative of the small-cap market space.
March 20, 2023	DY	Dycom Industries	HT	Hersha Hospitality Trust	DY was moved from the S&P 400 as it was more representative of the small cap market space. HT was removed from the S&P 600 as it was no longer representative of the small-cap market space.
March 20, 2023	WAFD	WaFd, Inc.	SRDX	Surmodics	WAFD was moved from the S&P 400 as it was more representative of the small cap market space. SRDX was removed from the S&P 600 as it was no longer representative of the small-cap market space.
March 20, 2023	VSAT	Viasat	ORGO	Organogenesis	VSAT was moved from the S&P 400 as it was more representative of the small cap market space. ORGO was removed from the S&P 600 as it was no longer representative of the small-cap market space.
March 20, 2023	CBRL	Cracker Barrel	UIS	Unisys	CBRL was moved from the S&P 400 as it was more representative of the small cap market space. UIS was removed from the S&P 600 as it was no longer representative of the small-cap market space.
March 20, 2023	SLG	SL Green Realty	PNTG	Pennant Group	SLG was moved from the S&P 400 as it was more representative of the small cap market space. PNTG was removed from the S&P 600 as it was no longer representative of the small-cap market space.
March 20, 2023	RDN	Radian Group	UEIC	Universal Electronics Inc	RDN replaced UEIC which was no longer representative of the small-cap market space.
March 20, 2023	NEX	NexTier Oilfield Solutions	MPAA	Motorcar Parts of America	NEX replaced MPAA which was no longer representative of the small-cap market space.
March 20, 2023	AUB	Atlantic Union Bank	FSP	Franklin Street Properties Corp.	AUB replaced FSB which was no longer representative of the small-cap market space.
March 20, 2023	KW	Kennedy Wilson	WW	WW International	KW replaced WW which was no longer representative of the small-cap market space.
March 1, 2023	VRRM	Verra Mobility	COLB	Columbia Banking System	VRRM replaced COLB which replaced Umpqua Holdings Corporation in the S&P 400. COLB acquired Umpqua Holdings and post-merger, COLB market cap was more representative of the mid-cap market space.
February 23, 2023	OTTR	Otter Tail Corporation	UFPI	UFP Industries	OTTR replaced UFP which replaced LHC Group, Inc. in the S&P 400 after it was acquired by UnitedHealth Group.
February 6, 2023	CRK	Comstock Resources	ADC	Agree Realty Corp.	CRK replaced ADC which replaced Store Capital in the S&P 400 after it was acquired by GIC and Oak Street.
February 2, 2023	NOG	Northern Oil and Gas	SJI	South Jersey Industries	NOG replaced SJI after it was acquired by Infrastructure Investments Fund.
January 31, 2023	DV	DoubleVerify	VIVO	Meridian Bioscience	DV replaced VIVO after it was acquired by SD Biosensor.
January 5, 2023	RXO	RXO	JYNT	The Joint Corp.	RXO was moved from the S&P 400 as it was more representative of the small cap market space. JYNT was removed from the S&P 600 as it was no longer representative of the small-cap market space.
December 19, 2022	MBC	MasterBrand	CONN	Conn's	MBC was spun off from Fortune Brands Innovations and replaced CONN which was no longer representative of the small-cap market space.
December 19, 2022	NUVA	NuVasive	TUP	Tupperware Brands	NUVA was moved from the S&P 400 as it was more representative of the small cap market space. TUP was removed from the S&P 600 as it was no longer representative of the small-cap market space.
December 19, 2022	SMTC	Semtech	DHC	Diversified Healthcare Trust	SMTC was moved from the S&P 400 as it was more representative of the small cap market space. DHC was removed from the S&P 600 as it was no longer representative of the small-cap market space.
December 19, 2022	CWK	Cushman & Wakefield	DBD	Diebold Nixdorf	CWK was moved from the S&P 400 as it was more representative of the small cap market space. DBD was removed from the S&P 600 as it was no longer representative of the small-cap market space.
December 19, 2022	SJW	SJW Group	CATO	Cato Corporation	SJW was moved from the S&P 400 as it was more representative of the small cap market space. CATO was removed from the S&P 600 as it was no longer representative of the small-cap market space.
December 19, 2022	AGTI	Agiliti	LL	LL Flooring	AGTI was moved from the S&P 400 as it was more representative of the small cap market space. LL was removed from the S&P 600 as it was no longer representative of the small-cap market space.
December 1, 2022	SABR	Sabre Corporation	FBC	Flagstar Bancorp	FBC was acquired by New York Community Bancorp. SABR was moved from the S&P 400 to replace it as it was more representative of the small cap market space.
December 1, 2022	NUS	Nu Skin Enterprises	PBF	PBF Energy	NUS was moved from the S&P 400 as it was more representative of the small cap market space. PBF was removed from the S&P 600 as it was no longer representative of the small-cap market space.
November 2, 2022	BFH	Bread Financial	UFI	Unifi	BFH was moved from the S&P 400 as it was more representative of the small cap market space. UFI was removed from the S&P 600 as it was no longer representative of the small-cap market space.
October 18, 2022	MLKN	MillerKnoll	CVET	Covetrus	CVET was acquired by Clayton, Dubilier & Rice. MLKN was moved from the S&P 400 to replace it as it was more representative of the small cap market space.
October 12, 2022	PAYO	Payoneer	LNTH	Lantheus Holdings	PAYO replaced LNTH which replaced Targa Resources in the S&P 400 after it was moved to the S&P 500.
October 3, 2022	HAIN	Hain Celestial Group	HNGR	Hanger, Inc.	HNGR was acquired by Patient Square Capital, LP. HAIN was moved from the S&P 400 to replace it as it was more representative of the small cap market space.
October 3, 2022	MCW	Mister Car Wash	EXLS	EXL Service Holdings	MCW replaced EXLS which replaced EQT Corp. in the S&P 400 after it was moved to the S&P 500.
October 3, 2022	XPER	Xperi, Inc.	SLQT	SelectQuote	Xperi Holding Corporation spun off Xperi Incorporated. Post spin off both companies remained in the S&P 600 but Xperi Holding Corporation was renamed to Adeia Incorporated (Nasdaq: ADEA). SLQT was removed from the S&P 600 as it was no longer representative of the small-cap market space.
October 3, 2022	STEL	Stellar Bancorp	ABTX	Allegiance Bancshares	ABTX was acquired by CBTX, Inc. and post merger the combined company changed its name and ticker symbol to Stellar Bancorp (Nasdaq: STEL).
September 28, 2022	LESL	Leslie's	GCP	GCP Applied Technologies	LESL replaced GCP after it was acquired by Compagnie de Saint-Gobain S.A.
September 19, 2022	HPP	Hudson Pacific Properties	APEI	American Public Education	HPP was moved from the S&P 400 as it was more representative of the small cap market space. APEI was removed from the S&P 600 as it was no longer representative of the small-cap market space.
September 19, 2022	MCY	Mercury General	EHTH	eHealth	MCY was moved from the S&P 400 as it was more representative of the small cap market space. EHTH was removed from the S&P 600 as it was no longer representative of the small-cap market space.
September 19, 2022	AEO	American Eagle Outfitters	CAMP	CalAmp	AEO was moved from the S&P 400 as it was more representative of the small cap market space. CAMP was removed from the S&P 600 as it was no longer representative of the small-cap market space.
September 19, 2022	MTX	Minerals Technology	GLT	Glatfelter	MTX was moved from the S&P 400 as it was more representative of the small cap market space. GLT was removed from the S&P 600 as it was no longer representative of the small-cap market space.
September 19, 2022	OUT	Outfront Media	FOSL	Fossil Group	OUT was moved from the S&P 400 as it was more representative of the small cap market space. FOSL was removed from the S&P 600 as it was no longer representative of the small-cap market space.
September 15, 2022	CPRX	Catalyst Pharmaceuticals	MANT	ManTech International	CPRX replaced MANT after it was acquired by The Carlyle Group.
September 1, 2022	AVID	Avid Technology	POLY	Plantronics	AVID replaced POLY after it was acquired by HP Inc.
August 10, 2022	CLFD	Clearfield	CELH	Celsius Holdings	CLFD replaced CELH which replaced American Campus Communities in the S&P 400 after it was acquired by Blackstone Inc.
August 4, 2022	AHCO	AdaptHealth	MTOR	Meritor	AHCO replaced MTOR after it was acquired by Cummins.
July 26, 2022	SIX	Six Flags	NTUS	Natus Medical	NTUS was acquired by Archimed. SIX was moved from the S&P 400 to replace it as it was more representative of the small cap market space.
July 21, 2022	SHO	Sunstone Hotel Investors	VG	Vonage	SHO replaced VG after it was acquired by Ericsson.
July 20, 2022	GRBK	Green Brick Partners	COKE	Coca-Cola Bottling Co. Consolidated	GRBK replaced COKE which replaced PS Business Parks in the S&P 400 after it was acquired by Blackstone Inc.
July 6, 2022	FTDR	Frontdoor, Inc.	SWN	Southwestern Energy	FTDR replaced SWN which replaced CDK Global in the S&P 400 after it was acquired by Brookfield Business Partners.
July 5, 2022	LRN	Stride, Inc.	OMCL	Omnicell	LRN replaced OMCL which replaced Coherent, Inc. in the S&P 400 after it was acquired by II-VI Incorporated.
July 5, 2022	EHAB	Enhabit, Inc.	LYLT	Loyalty Ventures	EHAB was spun off from S&P 400 constituent Encompass Health and replaced LYLT which was no longer representative of the small-cap market space.
July 5, 2022	SNCY	Sun Country Airlines	NP	Neenah, Inc.	SNCY replaced NP after it was acquired by Schweitzer- Mauduit International, Inc.
June 29, 2022	APPS	Digital Turbine	TVTY	Tivity Health	TVTY was acquired by Stone Point Capital LLC. APPS was moved from the S&P 400 to replace it as it was more representative of the small cap market space.
June 21, 2022	TRN	Trinity Industries	ENDP	Endo International	TRN was moved from the S&P 400 as it was more representative of the small cap market space. ENDP was removed from the S&P 600 as it was no longer representative of the small-cap market space.
June 21, 2022	YELP	Yelp	RRGB	Red Robin	YELP was moved from the S&P 400 as it was more representative of the small cap market space. RRGB was removed from the S&P 600 as it was no longer representative of the small-cap market space.
June 21, 2022	URBN	Urban Outfitters	TCMD	Tactile Systems Technology	URBN was moved from the S&P 400 as it was more representative of the small cap market space. TCMD was removed from the S&P 600 as it was no longer representative of the small-cap market space.
June 21, 2022	RAMP	LiveRamp	VRA	Vera Bradley	RAMP was moved from the S&P 400 as it was more representative of the small cap market space. VRA was removed from the S&P 600 as it was no longer representative of the small-cap market space.
June 21, 2022	IRWD	Ironwood Pharmaceuticals	GHL	Greenhill & Co.	IRWD replaced GHL which was no longer representative of the small-cap market space.
June 16, 2022	EYE	National Vision Holdings	REGI	Renewable Energy Group	EYE replaced REGI after it was acquired by Chevron Corporation.
May 19, 2022	AOSL	Alpha and Omega Semiconductor	IRT	Independence Realty Trust	AOSL replaced IRT which replaced Mimecast in the S&P 400 after it was acquired by Permira Holdings, Inc.
May 17, 2022	DVAX	Dynavax Technologies	EPAY	Bottomline Technologies	DVAX replaced EPAY after it was acquired by Thoma Bravo.
May 3, 2022	TPH	Tri Pointe Homes	ECOL	US Ecology	ECOL was acquired by Republic Services. TPH was moved from the S&P 400 to replace it as it was more representative of the small cap market space.
April 26, 2022	ATEN	A10 Networks	FOE	Ferro Corporation	ATEN replaced FOE after it was acquired by Prince International Corp., a portfolio company of American Securities LLC.
April 8, 2022	GOGO	Gogo, Inc.	FLOW	SPX FLOW, Inc.	GOGO replaced FLOW after it was acquired by Lone Star Funds.
April 7, 2022	RCUS	Arcus Biosciences	ISBC	Investors Bancorp, Inc.	RCUS replaced ISBC after it was acquired by Citizens Financial Group.
April 6, 2022	PRG	PROG Holdings	FRGI	Fiesta Restaurant Group	PRG was moved from the S&P 400 to replace FRGI which was no longer representative of the small-cap market space.
April 4, 2022	VIR	Vir Biotechnology	MTDR	Matador Resources	VIR replaced MTDR which replaced Camden Property Trust in the S&P 400 after it was moved to the S&P 500.
April 4, 2022	EMBC	Embecta Corp.	BNED	Barnes & Noble Education, Inc.	EMBC was spun off from S&P 500 constituent Becton, Dickinson and Company and replaced BNED which was no longer representative of the small-cap market space.
March 30, 2022	SONO	Sonos	GTLS	Chart Industries, Inc.	SONO replaced GTLS which replaced CyrusOne in the S&P 400 after it was acquired by Kohlberg Kravis Roberts and Global Infrastructure Partners.
March 16, 2022	ASO	Academy Sports + Outdoors	KRA	Kraton	ASO replaced KRA after it was acquired by DL Chemical Co., Ltd.
March 14, 2022	CRNC	Cerence	CPS	Cooper-Standard Holdings, Inc.	CRNC was moved from the S&P 400 to replace CPS which was no longer representative of the small-cap market space.
March 2, 2022	GDEN	Golden Entertainment	RRC	Range Resources	GDEN replaced RRC which replaced Molina Healthcare in the S&P 400 after it was moved to the S&P 500.
March 2, 2022	ZIMV	ZimVie	TRHC	Tabula Rasa HealthCare	ZIMV was spun off from S&P 500 constituent Zimmer Biomet and replaced TRHC which was no longer representative of the small-cap market space.
February 18, 2022	UE	Urban Edge Properties	ONB	Old National Bancorp	UE moved down from the S&P 400 and swapped places with ONB which moved up. ONB acquired First Midwest Bancorp and post-merger, ONB was more representative of the mid-cap market space. UE is more representative of the small-cap market space.
February 18, 2022	CRSR	Corsair Gaming	FMBI	First Midwest Bancorp	CRSR replaced FMBI after it was acquired by Old National Bancorp.
February 15, 2022	XPEL	XPEL, Inc.	PDCE	PDC Energy, Inc.	XPEL replaced PDCE which replaced Nordson Corporation in the S&P 400 after it was moved to the S&P 500.
February 3, 2022	JACK	Jack in the Box	SPPI	Spectrum Pharmaceuticals	JACK was moved from the S&P 400 to replace SPPI which was no longer representative of the small-cap market space.
February 1, 2022	CMP	Compass Minerals	GWB	Great Western Bancorp, Inc.	GWB was acquired by First Interstate BancSystem. CMP was moved from the S&P 400 to replace it as it was more representative of the small-cap market space.
February 1, 2022	TWNK	Hostess Brands	WTS	Watts Water Technologies	TWNK replaced WTS which replaced Sterling Bancorp in the S&P 400 after it was acquired by Webster Bank.
January 5, 2022	ITOS	iTeos Therapeutics	MGLN	Magellan Health	ITOS replaced MGLN after it was acquired by S&P 500 constituent Centene Corporation.
December 30, 2021	DOUG	Douglas Elliman	MTRX	Matrix Service Company	DOUG was spun off from S&P 600 constituent Vector Group and replaced MTRX which was no longer representative of the small-cap market space. Post spin-off, Vector Group remained in the S&P 600.
December 20, 2021	TR	Tootsie Roll Industries	M	Macy's, Inc.	TR moved down from the S&P 400 and swapped places with M which moved up.
December 20, 2021	TDS	Telephone and Data Systems	VICR	Vicor Corporation	TDS moved down from the S&P 400 and swapped places with VICR which moved up.
December 20, 2021	NKTR	Nektar Therapeutics	POWI	Power Integrations	NKTR moved down from the S&P 400 and swapped places with POWI which moved up.
December 2, 2021	KAR	KAR Auction Services	MDP	Meredith Corporation	MDP was acquired in a two-step transaction by Gray Television and Dotdash. KAR was moved from the S&P 400 to replace it as it was more representative of the small cap market space.
December 2, 2021	CARS	Cars.com	DSPG	DSP Group	CARS replaced DSPG after it was acquired by Synaptics, Inc.
December 2, 2021	NVEE	NV5 Global	RAVN	Raven Industries	NVEE replaced RAVN after it was acquired by CNH Industrial.
November 30, 2021	EBS	Emergent BioSolutions	UFS	Domtar Corp.	UFS was acquired by Paper Excellence. EBS was moved from the S&P 400 to replace it as it was more representative of the small cap market space.
November 24, 2021	THRY	Thryv	ECHO	Echo Global Logistics	THRY replaced ECHO after it was acquired by The Jordan Company.
November 16, 2021	ONL	Orion Office REIT	DAKT	Daktronics, Inc.	ONL was spun off from Realty Income and moved down to replace DAKT which was no longer representative of the small-cap market space.
November 9, 2021	LYLT	Loyalty Ventures	AAOI	Applied Optoelectronics	LYLT was spun off from Alliance Data and moved down to replace AAOI which was no longer representative of the small-cap market space.
November 5, 2021	NTCT	NetScout Systems	IVC	Invacare Corporation	NTCT moved down from the S&P 400 and replaced IVC which was no longer representative of the small-cap market space.
October 29, 2021	CDMO	Avid Biosciences	CADE	Cadence Bank	CDMO replaced CADE after it was acquired by BancorpSouth.
October 22, 2021	HRMY	Harmony Biosciences	RPAI	Retail Properties of America	HRMY replaced RPAI after it was acquired by Kite Realty Group Trust.
October 22, 2021	TREE	LendingTree	KRG	Kite Realty Group Trust	TREE moved down from the S&P 400 and swapped places with KRG which moved up. TREE has a market capitalization that is more representative of the small-cap market space.
October 19, 2021	FBRT	Franklin BSP Realty Trust, Inc.	CMO	Capstead Mortgage Corporation	After the close of trading on October 18, 2021, CMO ceased to be publicly traded on the New York Stock Exchange. At the open of trading on October 19, 2021, the combined company will trade on the NYSE under the ticker symbol FBRT.
October 11, 2021	CCSI	Consensus Cloud Solutions	RGS	Regis Corporation	CCSI was spun off from S&P 400 constituent J2 Global and moved down to replace RGS which was no longer representative of the small-cap market space. Post spin-off, J2 Global will remain in the S&P MidCap 400 and will change its name to Ziff Davis, Inc.
October 4, 2021	OPRX	OptimizeRx Corp.	LDL	Lydall, Inc.	OPRX replaced LDL after it was acquired by Clearlake Capital.
October 4, 2021	SLVM	Sylvamo	STMP	Stamps.com, Inc.	SLVM was spun off from S&P 500 constituent International Paper and moved down to replace STMP which was acquired by Thoma Bravo.
September 20, 2021	WW	WW International	TISI	Team, Inc	WW moved down from the S&P 400 and replaced TISI which was no longer representative of the small-cap market space.
September 20, 2021	HCSG	Healthcare Services Group, Inc.	MSTR	MicroStrategy, Inc.	HCSG moved down from the S&P 400 and replaced MSTR which was no longer representative of the small-cap market space.
September 20, 2021	QURE	uniQure N.V.	UIHC	United Insurance Holdings Corp.	QURE replaced UIHC which was no longer representative of the small-cap market space.
September 7, 2021	LGND	Ligand Pharmaceuticals	CBB	Cincinnati Bell	CBB was acquired by Macquarie Infrastructure and Real Assets. LGND was moved from the S&P 400 to replace it as it was more representative of the small cap market space.
September 3, 2021	THS	TreeHouse Foods	CORE	Core-Mark Holding Company, Inc.	CORE was acquired by Performance Food Group. THS was moved from the S&P 400 to replace it as it was more representative of the small cap market space.
August 30, 2021	BLFS	BioLife Solutions	SAIA	Saia, Inc.	BLFS replaced SAIA which replaced Bio-Techne in the S&P 400 after it was moved to the S&P 500.
August 30, 2021	CNK	Cinemark Holdings	USCR	U.S. Concrete	USCR was acquired by Vulcan Materials Company. CNK was moved from the S&P 400 to replace it as it was more representative of the small-cap market space.
August 30, 2021	TRMK	Trustmark Corp.	SYKE	Sykes Enterprises	SYKE was acquired by Sitel Group. TRMK was moved from the S&P 400 to replace it as it was more representative of the small-cap market space.
August 4, 2021	LKFN	Lakeland Financial Corp.	GME	GameStop Corp.	LKFN replaced GME which replaced Weingarten Realty Investors in the S&P 400 after it was acquired by Kimco Realty.
August 4, 2021	INT	World Fuel Services	SPOK	Spok Holdings, Inc.	INT moved down from the S&P 400 and replaced SPOK which was no longer representative of the small-cap market space.
August 3, 2021	STRA	Strategic Education, Inc.	BELFB	Bel Fuse, Inc.	STRA moved down from the S&P 400 and replaced BELFB which was no longer representative of the small-cap market space.
July 15, 2021	MSEX	Middlesex Water Company	LMNX	Luminex Corporation	MSEX replaced LMNX after it was acquired by DiaSorin.
July 7, 2021	ATGE	Adtalem Global Education	BPFH	Boston Private Financial Holdings	ATGE moved down from the S&P 400 and replaced BPFH which was acquired by SVB Financial Group.
June 22, 2021	TWO	Two Harbors Investment Corp.	CATM	Cardtronics	TWO replaced CATM after it was acquired by NCR Corporation.
June 15, 2021	AMEH	Apollo Medical Holdings, Inc.	ELY	Callaway Golf Company	AMEH replaced ELY which replaced Grubhub in the S&P 400 after it was acquired by Just Eat Takeaway.
June 10, 2021	SLQT	SelectQuote, Inc.	CTB	Cooper Tire & Rubber Company	SLQT replaced CTB after it was acquired by Goodyear Tire and Rubber Company.
June 4, 2021	SVC	Service Properties Trust	LCI	Lannett Company, Inc.	SVC moved down from the S&P 400 and replaced LCI which was no longer representative of the small-cap market space.
June 2, 2021	ORGO	Organogenesis Holdings Inc.	CROX	Crocs, Inc.	ORGO replaced CROX which replaced Cantel Medical Corporation in the S&P 400 after it was acquired by Steris plc.
May 27, 2021	JYNT	The Joint Corp.	CUB	Cubic Corporation	JYNT replaced CUB after it was acquired by Veritas Capital.
May 17, 2021	AVNS	Avanos Medical	AEGN	Aegion Corp.	AEGN was acquired by New Mountain Capital. AVNS was moved from the S&P 400 to replace it as it was more representative of the small cap market space.
May 14, 2021	EFC	Ellington Financial	NSA	National Storage Affiliates Trust	EFC replaced NSA which replaced Charles River Laboratories in the S&P 400 after it was moved to the S&P 500.
May 7, 2021	TBBK	The Bancorp, Inc.	RCM	R1 RCM	TBBK replaced RCM which replaced Perspecta Inc. in the S&P 400 after it was acquired by Veritas Capital.
May 3, 2021	GNW	Genworth Financial	GLUU	Glu Mobile	GLUU was acquired by Electronic Arts. GNW was moved from the S&P 400 to replace it as it was more representative of the small cap market space.
May 3, 2021	UTL	Unitil Corporation	WDR	Waddell & Reed	UTL replaced WDR after it was acquired by Macquarie Group.
April 20, 2021	UFS	Domtar Corp.	EGOV	NIC Inc.	EGOV was acquired component Tyler Technologies. UFS was moved from the S&P 400 to replace it as it was more representative of the small cap market space.
April 15, 2021	RILY	B. Riley Financial	MIK	The Michaels Companies	RILY replaced MIK after it was acquired by Apollo Global Management.
April 12, 2021	IDCC	InterDigital	CKH	SEACOR Holdings	CKH was acquired by American Industrial Partners. IDCC was moved from the S&P 400 to replace it as it was more representative of the small cap market space.
April 8, 2021	CARA	Cara Therapeutics	MTSC	MTS Systems Corporation	CARA replaced MTSC after it was acquired by Amphenol Corp.
March 30, 2021	OI	O-I Glass	HMSY	HMS Holdings	HMSY was acquired by Veritas Capital. OI was moved from the S&P 400 to replace it as it was more representative of the small cap market space.
March 22, 2021	VCEL	Vericel	QEP	QEP Resources	VCEL replaced QEP after it was acquired by Diamondback Energy.
March 22, 2021	EPC	Edgewell Personal Care	EXTN	Exterran Corporation	EPC moved down from the S&P 400 and replaced EXTN which was no longer representative of the small-cap market space.
March 1, 2021	WSFS	WSFS Financial	CLF	Cleveland-Cliffs	WSFS replaced CLF which replaced Eaton Vance in the S&P 400 after it was acquired by Morgan Stanley.
February 16, 2021	HNI	HNI Corporation	VRTU	Virtusa Corporation	VRTU was acquired by Baring Private Equity Asia. HNI was moved from the S&P 400 to replace it as it was more representative of the small cap market space.
February 12, 2021	COLL	Collegium Pharmaceutical	IRDM	Iridium Communications	COLL replaced IRDM which replaced Monolithic Power Systems in the S&P 400 after it was moved to the S&P 500.
February 10, 2021	ISBC	Investors Bancorp, Inc.	BEAT	BioTelemetry, Inc.	ISBC replaced BEAT after it was acquired by multinational comglomerate Koninklijke Philips N.V.
January 29, 2021	PBH	Prestige Consumer Healthcare	FBM	Foundation Building Materials, Inc.	FBM was acquired by American Securities LLC. PBH was moved from the S&P 400 to replace it as it was more representative of the small cap market space.
January 21, 2021	HTH	Hilltop Holdings Inc.	YETI	Yeti Holdings	HTH replaced YETI which replaced Trimble Inc. in the S&P 400 after it was moved to the S&P 500.
January 7, 2021	CELH	Celsius Holdings	CPRI	Capri Holdings	CELH replaced CPRI which replaced Enphase Energy in the S&P 400 after it was moved to the S&P 500.
January 7, 2021	ELF	e.l.f. Beauty, Inc.	BRKS	Brooks Automation, Inc.	ELF replaced BRKS which replaced WPX Energy in the S&P 400 after it was acquired by Devon Energy Corp.
December 29, 2020	SMPL	The Simply Good Foods Co.	KNSL	Kinsale Capital Group	SMPL replaced KNSL which replaced Taubman Centers in the S&P 400 after it was acquired by Simon Property Group.
December 2, 2020	AMCX	AMC Networks	RRD	R.R. Donnelley & Sons	AMCX moved down from the S&P 400 and replaced RRD which was no longer representative of the small-cap market space.
December 2, 2020	AAN	The Aaron's Company, Inc.	GEOS	Geospace Technologies	AAN was spun off from S&P 400 parent Aaron's Holding Company, Inc. (NYSE: PRG) and moved down to replace GEOS which was no longer representative of the small-cap market space.
November 13, 2020	FBNC	First Bancorp	AMAG	AMAG Pharmaceuticals	FBNC replaced AMAG after it was acquired by Covis Group.
November 13, 2020	GEO	GEO Group	GPOR	Gulfport Energy	GEO moved down from the S&P 400 and replaced GPOR which was no longer representative of the small-cap market space.
November 13, 2020	MD	Mednax	WPG	Washington Prime Group	MD moved down from the S&P 400 and replaced WPG which was no longer representative of the small-cap market space.
October 7, 2020	CFFN	Capitol Federal Savings Bank	NEOG	Neogen Corp.	CFFN replaced NEOG which replaced Pool Corp. in the S&P 400 after it was moved to the S&P 500.
October 7, 2020	AGO	Assured Guaranty	SSD	Simpson Manufacturing Company	AGO replaced SSD which replaced Delphi Technologies in the S&P 400 after it was acquired by BorgWarner, Inc.
October 7, 2020	RNST	Renasant Corp.	NR	Newpark Resources, Inc.	RNST replaced NR which was no longer representative of the small-cap market space.
October 5, 2020	SBH	Sally Beauty Holdings	OAS	Oasis Petroleum	SBH moved down from the S&P 400 and replaced OAS which was no longer representative of the small-cap market space.
October 1, 2020	CPK	Chesapeake Utilities	MNTA	Momenta Pharmaceuticals	CPK replaced MNTA after it was acquired by Johnson & Johnson.
September 25, 2020	FLGT	Fulgent Genetics	GTX	Garrett Motion	FLGT replaced GTX which was no longer representative of the small-cap market space.
September 21, 2020	PBF	PBF Energy	WING	Wingstop	WING was moved from the S&P 600 to the S&P 400 replacing PBF which was moved from the S&P 400 to the S&P 600 based on market cap changes.
September 21, 2020	ATI	Allegheny Technologies	MEDP	Medpace	MEDP was moved from the S&P 600 to the S&P 400 replacing ATI which was moved from the S&P 400 to the S&P 600 based on market cap changes.
September 21, 2020	CLI	Mack-Cali Realty Corp.	FOXF	Fox Factory Holding Corp.	FOXF was moved from the S&P 600 to the S&P 400 replacing CLI which was moved from the S&P 400 to the S&P 600 based on market cap changes.
September 21, 2020	COOP	Mr. Cooper Group	EXPR	Express, Inc.	COOP replaced EXPR which was no longer representative of the small-cap market space.
September 21, 2020	RCM	R1 RCM	PEI	Pennsylvania Real Estate	RCM replaced PEI which was no longer representative of the small-cap market space.
September 1, 2020	BKU	BankUnited	LAD	Lithia Motors	BKU replaced LAD which replaced LogMeIn in the S&P 400 after it was acquired by Francisco Partners and Elliott Management Corporation.
September 1, 2020	TRUP	Trupanion	REI	Ring Energy	TRUP replaced REI which was no longer representative of the small-cap market space.
August 17, 2020	FBK	FB Financial	FSB	Franklin Financial Network	FBK replaced FSB as Franklin Financial Network was acquired by FB Financial
August 17, 2020	CXW	CoreCivic	VAL	Valaris	CXW replaced VAL which was no longer representative of the small-cap market space.
August 3, 2020	BANF	BancFirst	RUN	Sunrun	BANF replaced RUN which was no longer representative of the small-cap market space.
August 3, 2020	DLX	Deluxe Corporation	EE	El Paso Electric	DLX replaced EE as El Paso Electric was acquired.
August 3, 2020	CRS	Carpenter Technology	CDR	Cedar Realty Trust	CRS replaced CDR which was no longer representative of the small-cap market space.
July 24, 2020	FHB	First Hawaiian Bank	EBS	Emergent BioSolutions	FHB replaced EBS which was no longer representative of the small-cap market space.
June 30, 2020	RPAI	Retail Properties of America Inc.	BLD	TopBuild	RPAI replaced BLD which was no longer representative of the small-cap market space.
June 30, 2020	BDN	Brandywine Realty Trust	BGG	Briggs & Stratton	BDN replaced BGG which was no longer representative of the small-cap market space.
June 25, 2020	EAT	Brinker International	AXE	Anixter	EAT replaced AXE as Anixter International was acquired by WESCO International.
June 22, 2020	DNOW	NOW Inc.	TLRD	Tailored Brands	DNOW replaced TLRD which was no longer representative of the small-cap market space.
June 22, 2020	CAKE	Cheesecake Factory	CBL	CBL & Associates Properties	CAKE replaced CBL which was no longer representative of the small-cap market space.
June 22, 2020	REZI	Resideo Technologies	HPR	HighPoint Resources	REZI replaced HPR which was no longer representative of the small-cap market space.
June 22, 2020	BSIG	BrightSphere Investment Group	TTI	TETRA Technologies	BSIG replaced TTI which was no longer representative of the small-cap market space.
June 22, 2020	BBBY	Bed Bath & Beyond	STRA	Strategic Education, Inc.	BBBY replaced STRA which was no longer representative of the small-cap market space.
June 22, 2020	MTDR	Matador Resources	QLYS	Qualys	MTDR replaced QLYS which was no longer representative of the small-cap market space.
June 22, 2020	MDRX	Allscripts Healthcare Solutions	GBCI	Glacier Bancorp	MDRX replaced GBCI which was no longer representative of the small-cap market space.
June 1, 2020	DHC	Diversified Healthcare Trust	FG	FGL Holdings	DHC replaced FG as FGL Holdings was acquired by Fidelity National Financial.
June 1, 2020	SLP	Simulations Plus	TIVO	TiVo Inc.	SLP replaced TIVO as TiVo Inc. was acquired by Xperi.
June 1, 2020	PLMR	Palomar Holdings	LXU	LSB Industries	PLMR replaced LXU which was no longer representative of the small-cap market space.
June 1, 2020	CHRS	Coherus Biosciences	OPB	Opus Bank	CHRS replaced OPB as Opus Bank was acquired by Pacific Premier Bancorp.
June 1, 2020	PTEN	Patterson-UTI Energy	NE	Noble Corporation	PTEN replaced NE which was no longer representative of the small-cap market space.
May 22, 2020	HP	Helmerich & Payne	JCP	JCPenney	HP replaced JCP which filed for Chapter 11 bankruptcy.
May 12, 2020	CPRI	Capri Holdings	ACOR	Acorda Therapeutics	CPRI replaced ACOR which was no longer representative of the small-cap market space.
May 1, 2020	CLB	Core Laboratories	AKRX	Akorn	CLB replaced AKRX which filed for Chapter 11 bankruptcy.
May 1, 2020	MDP	Meredith Corporation	DO	Diamond Offshore Drilling	MDP replaced DO which filed for Chapter 11 bankruptcy.
April 17, 2020	YETI	YETI Holdings	LHCG	LHC Group	YETI replaced LHCG which was no longer representative of the small-cap market space.
February 13, 2020	ALEX	Alexander & Baldwin	DPLO	Diplomat Pharmacy	ALEX replaced DPLO as Diplomat Pharmacy was acquired by UnitedHealth Group.
February 13, 2020	CRMT	America's Car-Mart	CRCM	Care.com	CRMT replaced CRCM as Care.com was acquired by IAC.
February 6, 2020	GDOT	Green Dot Corporation	WLH	William Lyon Homes	GDOT replaced WLH as William Lyon Homes was acquired by Taylor Morrison.
February 4, 2020	RUN	Sunrun	DAR	Darling Ingredients	RUN replaced DAR which was no longer representative of the small-cap market space.
January 27, 2020	SKT	Tanger Factory Outlet Centers	MDR	McDermott International	SKT replaced MDR which filed for Chapter 11 bankruptcy.
January 2, 2020	FBM	Foundation Building Materials	RH	RH	FBM replaced RH which was no longer representative of the small-cap market space.
December 23, 2019	UNIT	Uniti Group	CRZO	Carrizo Oil & Gas	UNIT replaced CRZO as Carrizo Oil & Gas was acquired by Callon Petroleum Company.
December 23, 2019	OAS	Oasis Petroleum	UNIT	Unit Corp	OAS replaced UNIT which was no longer representative of the small-cap market space.
December 23, 2019	SWN	Southwestern Energy	FTR	Frontier Communications	SWN replaced FTR which was no longer representative of the small-cap market space.
December 17, 2019	PLT	Plantronics	VSI	Vitamin Shoppe	PLT replaced VSI as Vitamin Shoppe was acquired by Franchise Group.

== See also ==
- Russell 1000 Index
- S&P 400
- List of S&P 400 companies
- S&P 500
- List of S&P 500 companies
- S&P 1500
