= List of S&P 400 companies =

Below is a list of companies having stocks that are included in the S&P MidCap 400 (S&P 400) stock market index. The index, maintained by S&P Dow Jones Indices, comprises the common stocks of 400 mid-cap, mostly American, companies. Although called the S&P 400, the index sometimes contains more than 400 stocks when it includes two or more share classes of stock from one of its component companies.

== S&P MidCap 400 component stocks ==
Symbol	Security	GICS Sector	GICS Sub-Industry	Headquarters Location	SEC filings
AA	Alcoa	Materials	Aluminum	Pittsburgh, Pennsylvania	reports
AAL	American Airlines Group	Industrials	Passenger Airlines	Fort Worth, Texas	reports
AAON	AAON	Industrials	Building Products	Tulsa, Oklahoma	reports
ACI	Albertsons	Consumer Staples	Food Retail	Boise, Idaho	reports
ACM	AECOM	Industrials	Construction & Engineering	Dallas, Texas	reports
ADC	Agree Realty	Real Estate	Retail REITs	Bloomfield Hills, Michigan	reports
AEIS	Advanced Energy	Information Technology	Semiconductor Materials & Equipment	Denver, Colorado	reports
AFG	American Financial Group	Financials	Multi-line Insurance	Cincinnati, Ohio	reports
AGCO	AGCO	Industrials	Agricultural & Farm Machinery	Duluth, Georgia	reports
AGNC	AGNC Investment	Financials	Mortgage REITs	Bethesda, Maryland	reports
AHR	American Healthcare REIT	Real Estate	Health Care REITs	Irvine, California	reports
AIT	Applied Industrial Technologies	Industrials	Trading Companies & Distributors	Cleveland, Ohio	reports
ALGM	Allegro MicroSystems	Information Technology	Semiconductors	Manchester, New Hampshire	reports
ALK	Alaska Air Group	Industrials	Passenger Airlines	SeaTac, Washington	reports
ALLY	Ally Financial	Financials	Consumer Finance	Detroit, Michigan	reports
ALSN	Allison Transmission	Industrials	Construction Machinery & Heavy Transportation Equipment	Indianapolis, Indiana	reports
ALV	Autoliv	Consumer Discretionary	Automotive Parts & Equipment	Stockholm, Sweden	reports
AM	Antero Midstream	Energy	Oil & Gas Storage & Transportation	Denver, Colorado	reports
AMG	Affiliated Managers Group	Financials	Asset Management & Custody Banks	West Palm Beach, Florida	reports
AMH	American Homes 4 Rent	Real Estate	Single-Family Residential REITs	Las Vegas, Nevada	reports
AMKR	Amkor Technology	Information Technology	Semiconductors	Tempe, Arizona	reports
AN	AutoNation	Consumer Discretionary	Automotive Retail	Fort Lauderdale, Florida	reports
ANF	Abercrombie & Fitch	Consumer Discretionary	Apparel Retail	New Albany, Ohio	reports
APG	APi Group	Industrials	Construction & Engineering	New Brighton, Minnesota	reports
APPF	AppFolio	Information Technology	Application Software	Goleta, California	reports
AR	Antero Resources	Energy	Oil & Gas Exploration & Production	Denver, Colorado	reports
ARMK	Aramark	Consumer Discretionary	Distributors	Philadelphia, Pennsylvania	reports
ARW	Arrow Electronics	Information Technology	Technology Distributors	Centennial, Colorado	reports
ARWR	Arrowhead Pharmaceuticals	Health Care	Biotechnology	Pasadena, California	reports
ASB	Associated Bank	Financials	Regional Banks	Green Bay, Wisconsin	reports
ASH	Ashland Global	Materials	Diversified Chemicals	Wilmington, Delaware	reports
ATI	ATI Inc.	Industrials	Aerospace & Defense	Dallas, Texas	reports
ATR	AptarGroup	Materials	Metal, Glass & Plastic Containers	Crystal Lake, Illinois	reports
AVAV	AeroVironment	Industrials	Aerospace & Defense	Arlington County, Virginia	reports
AVNT	Avient	Materials	Specialty Chemicals	Avon Lake, Ohio	reports
AVT	Avnet	Information Technology	Technology Distributors	Phoenix, Arizona	reports
AVTR	Avantor	Health Care	Life Sciences Tools & Services	Radnor, Pennsylvania	reports
AXTA	Axalta	Materials	Specialty Chemicals	Philadelphia, Pennsylvania	reports
AYI	Acuity Brands	Industrials	Electrical Components & Equipment	Atlanta, Georgia	reports
BAH	Booz Allen Hamilton	Industrials	Research & Consulting Services	McLean, Virginia	reports
BBWI	Bath & Body Works, Inc.	Consumer Discretionary	Other Specialty Retail	Columbus, Ohio	reports
BC	Brunswick	Consumer Discretionary	Leisure Products	Mettawa, Illinois	reports
BCO	Brink's	Industrials	Security & Alarm Services	Richmond, Virginia	reports
BDC	Belden Inc.	Information Technology	Electronic Components	St. Louis, Missouri	reports
BHF	Brighthouse Financial	Financials	Life & Health Insurance	Charlotte, North Carolina	reports
BILL	Bill Holdings	Information Technology	Application Software	San Jose, California	reports
BIO	Bio-Rad Laboratories	Health Care	Life Sciences Tools & Services	Hercules, California	reports
BJ	BJ's Wholesale Club	Consumer Staples	Consumer Staples Merchandise Retail	Marlborough, Massachusetts	reports
BMRN	BioMarin Pharmaceutical	Health Care	Biotechnology	San Rafael, California	reports
BRKR	Bruker	Health Care	Health Care Equipment	Billerica, Massachusetts	reports
BROS	Dutch Bros Inc.	Consumer Discretionary	Restaurants	Tempe, Arizona	reports
BRX	Brixmor Property Group	Real Estate	Retail REITs	New York City, New York	reports
BSY	Bentley Systems	Information Technology	Application Software	Exton, Pennsylvania	reports
BTSG	BrightSpring Health Services	Health Care	Health Care Services	Louisville, Kentucky	reports
BURL	Burlington Stores	Consumer Discretionary	Apparel Retail	Burlington, New Jersey	reports
BWA	BorgWarner	Consumer Discretionary	Automotive Parts & Equipment	Auburn Hills, Michigan	reports
BWXT	BWX Technologies	Industrials	Aerospace & Defense	Lynchburg, Virginia	reports
BYD	Boyd Gaming	Consumer Discretionary	Casinos & Gaming	Las Vegas, Nevada	reports
CACI	CACI International	Industrials	Diversified Support Services	Reston, Virginia	reports
CAR	Avis Budget Group	Industrials	Passenger Ground Transportation	Parsippany, New Jersey	reports
CART	Maplebear Inc.	Consumer Staples	Food Retail	San Francisco, California	reports
CAVA	Cava Group	Consumer Discretionary	Restaurants	Washington, D.C.	reports
CBSH	Commerce Bancshares	Financials	Regional Banks	Kansas City, Missouri	reports
CBT	Cabot Corp	Materials	Diversified Chemicals	Boston, Massachusetts	reports
CCK	Crown Holdings	Materials	Paper & Plastic Packaging Products & Materials	Yardley, Pennsylvania	reports
CDE	Coeur Mining	Materials	Gold	Chicago, Illinois	reports
CDP	COPT Defense Properties	Real Estate	Office REITs	Columbia, Maryland	reports
CELH	Celsius Holdings	Consumer Staples	Soft Drinks & Non-alcoholic Beverages	Boca Raton, Florida	reports
CFR	Frost Bank	Financials	Regional Banks	San Antonio, Texas	reports
CG	Carlyle Group (The)	Financials	Asset Management & Custody Banks	Washington, D.C.	reports
CGNX	Cognex	Information Technology	Electronic Equipment & Instruments	Natick, Massachusetts	reports
CHDN	Churchill Downs Inc.	Consumer Discretionary	Casinos & Gaming	Louisville, Kentucky	reports
CHE	Chemed Corp.	Health Care	Health Care Services	Cincinnati, Ohio	reports
CHH	Choice Hotels	Consumer Discretionary	Hotels, Resorts & Cruise Lines	Rockville, Maryland	reports
CHRD	Chord Energy	Energy	Oil & Gas Exploration & Production	Houston, Texas	reports
CHWY	Chewy	Consumer Discretionary	Other Specialty Retail	Plantation, Florida	reports
CHYM	Chime Financial	Financials	Consumer Finance	San Francisco, California	reports
CLF	Cleveland-Cliffs	Materials	Steel	Cleveland, Ohio	reports
CLH	Clean Harbors	Industrials	Environmental & Facilities Services	Norwell, Massachusetts	reports
CMC	Commercial Metals	Materials	Steel	Irving, Texas	reports
CNH	CNH Industrial	Industrials	Agricultural & Farm Machinery	Amsterdam, Netherlands	reports
CNM	Core & Main	Industrials	Trading Companies & Distributors	St. Louis, Missouri	reports
CNO	CNO Financial Group	Financials	Life & Health Insurance	Carmel, Indiana	reports
CNX	CNX Resources	Energy	Oil & Gas Exploration & Production	Pittsburgh, Pennsylvania	reports
COKE	Coca-Cola Consolidated	Consumer Staples	Soft Drinks & Non-alcoholic Beverages	Charlotte, North Carolina	reports
COLB	Columbia Banking System	Financials	Regional Banks	Tacoma, Washington	reports
COLM	Columbia Sportswear	Consumer Discretionary	Apparel, Accessories & Luxury Goods	Portland, Oregon	reports
CORT	Corcept Therapeutics	Health Care	Pharmaceuticals	Redwood City, California	reports
CR	Crane	Industrials	Industrial Machinery & Supplies & Components	Stamford, Connecticut	reports
CRBG	Corebridge Financial	Financials	Asset Management & Custody Banks	Houston, Texas	reports
CROX	Crocs	Consumer Discretionary	Footwear	Broomfield, Colorado	reports
CRS	Carpenter Technology	Industrials	Industrial Machinery & Supplies & Components	Philadelphia, Pennsylvania	reports
CRUS	Cirrus Logic	Information Technology	Semiconductors	Austin, Texas	reports
CSL	Carlisle Companies	Industrials	Industrial Conglomerates	Phoenix, Arizona	reports
CTRE	CareTrust REIT	Real Estate	Health Care REITs	Dana Point, California	reports
CTVA	Corteva	Materials	Fertilizers & Agricultural Chemicals	Indianapolis, Indiana	reports
CUBE	CubeSmart	Real Estate	Industrial REITs	Malvern, Pennsylvania	reports
CUZ	Cousins Properties	Real Estate	Office REITs	Atlanta, Georgia	reports
CVLT	CommVault Systems	Information Technology	Systems Software	Tinton Falls, New Jersey	reports
CW	Curtiss-Wright	Industrials	Aerospace & Defense	Davidson, North Carolina	reports
CXT	Crane NXT	Information Technology	Electronic Equipment & Instruments	Stamford, Connecticut	reports
CYTK	Cytokinetics	Health Care	Biotechnology	South San Francisco, California	reports
DAR	Darling Ingredients	Consumer Staples	Agricultural Products & Services		reports
DBX	Dropbox	Information Technology	Application Software	San Francisco, California	reports
DCI	Donaldson Company	Industrials	Industrial Machinery & Supplies & Components	Bloomington, Minnesota	reports
DINO	HF Sinclair	Energy	Oil & Gas Refining & Marketing	Dallas, Texas	reports
DKS	Dick's Sporting Goods	Consumer Discretionary	Other Specialty Retail	Coraopolis, Pennsylvania	reports
DLB	Dolby	Information Technology	Application Software	San Francisco, California	reports
DOCN	DigitalOcean	Information Technology	Internet Services & Infrastructure	Broomfield, Colorado	reports
DOCS	Doximity	Health Care	Health Care Technology	San Francisco, California	reports
DOCU	Docusign	Information Technology	Application Software	San Francisco, California	reports
DT	Dynatrace	Information Technology	Application Software	Waltham, Massachusetts	reports
DTM	DT Midstream	Energy	Oil & Gas Storage & Transportation	Detroit, Michigan	reports
DUOL	Duolingo	Consumer Discretionary	Education Services	Pittsburgh, Pennsylvania	reports
DY	Dycom Industries	Industrials	Construction & Engineering	Palm Beach Gardens, Florida	reports
EAT	Brinker International	Consumer Discretionary	Restaurants	Dallas, Texas	reports
EEFT	Euronet Worldwide	Financials	Transaction & Payment Processing Services	Leawood, Kansas	reports
EGP	EastGroup Properties	Real Estate	Industrial REITs		reports
EHC	Encompass Health	Health Care	Health Care Facilities	Birmingham, Alabama	reports
ELAN	Elanco	Health Care	Pharmaceuticals	Greenfield, Indiana	reports
ELF	e.l.f. Beauty	Consumer Staples	Personal Care Products	Oakland, California	reports
ELS	Equity Lifestyle Properties	Real Estate	Single-Family Residential REITs	Chicago, Illinois	reports
ENS	EnerSys	Industrials	Electrical Components & Equipment	Reading, Pennsylvania	reports
ENSG	Ensign Group	Health Care	Health Care Facilities	San Juan Capistrano, California	reports
ENTG	Entegris	Information Technology	Semiconductor Materials & Equipment	Billerica, Massachusetts	reports
EPR	EPR Properties	Real Estate	Other Specialized REITs	Kansas City, Missouri	reports
EQH	Equitable Holdings	Financials	Diversified Financial Services	New York City, New York	reports
ESAB	ESAB	Industrials	Industrial Machinery & Supplies & Components	North Bethesda, Maryland	reports
ESNT	Essent Group Ltd.	Financials	Commercial & Residential Mortgage Finance		reports
EVR	Evercore	Financials	Investment Banking & Brokerage	New York City, New York	reports
EWBC	East West Bancorp	Financials	Regional Banks	Pasadena, California	reports
EXEL	Exelixis	Health Care	Biotechnology	Alameda, California	reports
EXLS	EXL Service	Industrials	Data Processing & Outsourced Services	New York City, New York	reports
EXP	Eagle Materials	Materials	Construction Materials	Dallas, Texas	reports
EXPO	Exponent, Inc.	Industrials	Research & Consulting Services	Menlo Park, California	reports
FAF	First American Financial Corporation	Financials	Property & Casualty Insurance	Santa Ana, California	reports
FBIN	Fortune Brands Innovations	Industrials	Building Products	Deerfield, Illinois	reports
FCFS	FirstCash	Financials	Consumer Finance	Fort Worth, Texas	reports
FCN	FTI Consulting	Industrials	Research & Consulting Services	Washington, D.C.	reports
FFIN	First Financial Bankshares	Financials	Regional Banks	Cincinnati, Ohio	reports
FHI	Federated Hermes	Financials	Asset Management & Custody Banks	Pittsburgh, Pennsylvania	reports
FHN	First Horizon	Financials	Regional Banks	Memphis, Tennessee	reports
FIVE	Five Below	Consumer Discretionary	Other Specialty Retail	Philadelphia, Pennsylvania	reports
FLG	Flagstar Bank	Financials	Regional Banks	Hicksville, New York	reports
FLR	Fluor	Industrials	Construction & Engineering	Irving, Texas	reports
FLS	Flowserve	Industrials	Industrial Machinery & Supplies & Components	Irving, Texas	reports
FN	Fabrinet	Information Technology	Electronic Manufacturing Services	Santa Clara, California	reports
FNB	FNB Corporation	Financials	Regional Banks	Pittsburgh, Pennsylvania	reports
FND	Floor & Decor	Consumer Discretionary	Home Improvement Retail	Smyrna, Georgia	reports
FNF	Fidelity National Financial	Financials	Property & Casualty Insurance	Jacksonville, Florida	reports
FORM	FormFactor	Information Technology	Semiconductor Materials & Equipment	Livermore, California	reports
FOUR	Shift4	Financials	Transaction & Payment Processing Services	Center Valley, Pennsylvania	reports
FR	First Industrial Realty Trust	Real Estate	Industrial REITs	Chicago, Illinois	reports
FTI	TechnipFMC	Energy	Oil & Gas Equipment & Services	Houston, Texas	reports
G	Genpact	Industrials	Data Processing & Outsourced Services	New York City, New York	reports
GAP	Gap Inc.	Consumer Discretionary	Apparel Retail	San Francisco, California	reports
GATX	GATX	Industrials	Construction Machinery & Heavy Transportation Equipment	Chicago, Illinois	reports
GBCI	Glacier Bancorp	Financials	Regional Banks	Kalispell, Montana	reports
GEF	Greif, Inc.	Materials	Metal, Glass & Plastic Containers	Delaware, Ohio	reports
GGG	Graco Inc.	Industrials	Industrial Machinery & Supplies & Components	Minneapolis, Minnesota	reports
GHC	Graham Holdings	Consumer Discretionary	Education Services	Arlington County, Virginia	reports
GKOS	Glaukos	Health Care	Health Care Equipment	Aliso Viejo, California	reports
GLPI	Gaming and Leisure Properties	Real Estate	Other Specialized REITs	Wyomissing, Pennsylvania	reports
GME	GameStop	Consumer Discretionary	Computer & Electronics Retail	Grapevine, Texas	reports
GMED	Globus Medical	Health Care	Health Care Equipment	Audubon, Pennsylvania	reports
GNTX	Gentex	Consumer Discretionary	Automotive Parts & Equipment	Zeeland, Michigan	reports
GPK	Graphic Packaging	Materials	Paper & Plastic Packaging Products & Materials	Atlanta, Georgia	reports
GWRE	Guidewire Software	Information Technology	Application Software	San Mateo, California	reports
GXO	GXO Logistics	Industrials	Air Freight & Logistics	Greenwich, Connecticut	reports
H	Hyatt	Consumer Discretionary	Hotels, Resorts & Cruise Lines	Chicago, Illinois	reports
HAE	Haemonetics	Health Care	Health Care Supplies	Boston, Massachusetts	reports
HALO	Halozyme	Health Care	Biotechnology	San Diego, California	reports
HGV	Hilton Grand Vacations	Consumer Discretionary	Hotels, Resorts & Cruise Lines	Orlando, Florida	reports
HIMS	Hims & Hers Health	Health Care	Health Care Services	San Francisco, California	reports
HL	Hecla Mining	Materials	Silver	Coeur d'Alene, Idaho	reports
HLI	Houlihan Lokey	Financials	Investment Banking & Brokerage	Los Angeles, California	reports
HLNE	Hamilton Lane	Financials	Asset Management & Custody Banks	Conshohocken, Pennsylvania	reports
HOG	Harley-Davidson	Consumer Discretionary	Motorcycle Manufacturers	Milwaukee, Wisconsin	reports
HOMB	Home BancShares	Financials	Regional Banks	Conway, Arkansas	reports
HQY	HealthEquity	Health Care	Managed Health Care	Draper, Utah	reports
HR	Healthcare Realty Trust	Real Estate	Health Care REITs		reports
HRB	H&R Block	Consumer Discretionary	Specialized Consumer Services	Kansas City, Missouri	reports
HUBS	HubSpot	Information Technology	Application Software	Cambridge, Massachusetts	reports
HWC	Hancock Whitney	Financials	Regional Banks	Gulfport, Mississippi	reports
HXL	Hexcel	Industrials	Aerospace & Defense	Stamford, Connecticut	reports
HZN	Bright Horizon Energy Corporation	Utilities	Multi-Utilities	Rapid City, South Dakota	reports
IBOC	Intl Bancshares Corp	Financials	Regional Banks	Laredo, Texas	reports
IDA	Idacorp	Utilities	Electric Utilities	Boise, Idaho	reports
IDCC	InterDigital	Information Technology	Communications Equipment	Wilmington, Delaware	reports
IESC	IES Holdings	Industrials	Construction & Engineering	Sugar Land, Texas	reports
INGR	Ingredion	Consumer Staples	Agricultural Products & Services	Westchester, Illinois	reports
IPGP	IPG Photonics	Information Technology	Electronic Manufacturing Services	Oxford, Massachusetts	reports
IRT	Independence Realty Trust	Real Estate	Multi-Family Residential REITs		reports
ITT	ITT Inc.	Industrials	Industrial Machinery & Supplies & Components	Stamford, Connecticut	reports
JAZZ	Jazz Pharmaceuticals	Health Care	Pharmaceuticals	Dublin, Ireland	reports
JEF	Jefferies	Financials	Multi-Sector Holdings	New York City, New York	reports
JHX	James Hardie Industries	Materials	Construction Materials	Dublin, Ireland	reports
JLL	Jones Lang LaSalle	Real Estate	Real Estate Services	Chicago, Illinois	reports
KBH	KB Home	Consumer Discretionary	Homebuilding	Los Angeles, California	reports
KBR	KBR, Inc.	Industrials	Diversified Support Services	Houston, Texas	reports
KD	Kyndryl	Information Technology	IT Consulting & Other Services	New York City, New York	reports
KEX	Kirby Corporation	Industrials	Marine Transportation	Houston, Texas	reports
KNF	Knife River Corporation	Materials	Construction Materials	Bismarck, North Dakota	reports
KNSL	Kinsale Capital Group	Financials	Property & Casualty Insurance		reports
KNX	Knight-Swift	Industrials	Cargo Ground Transportation	Phoenix, Arizona	reports
KRC	Kilroy Realty Corp	Real Estate	Office REITs		reports
KRG	Kite Realty Group Trust	Real Estate	Retail REITs		reports
KRYS	Krystal Biotech	Health Care	Biotechnology	Pittsburgh, Pennsylvania	reports
KTOS	Kratos Defense & Security Solutions	Industrials	Aerospace & Defense	San Diego, California	reports
LAD	Lithia Motors	Consumer Discretionary	Automotive Retail	Medford, Oregon	reports
LAMR	Lamar Advertising Company	Real Estate	Other Specialized REITs	Baton Rouge, Louisiana	reports
LEA	Lear	Consumer Discretionary	Automotive Parts & Equipment	Southfield, Michigan	reports
LECO	Lincoln Electric	Industrials	Industrial Machinery & Supplies & Components	Euclid, Ohio	reports
LFUS	Littelfuse	Information Technology	Electronic Components	Chicago, Illinois	reports
LIVN	LivaNova	Health Care	Health Care Equipment	Houston, Texas	reports
LNTH	Lantheus Holdings	Health Care	Health Care Supplies		reports
LOPE	Grand Canyon Education	Consumer Discretionary	Education Services	Phoenix, Arizona	reports
LPX	Louisiana-Pacific	Industrials	Building Products	Nashville, Tennessee	reports
LSCC	Lattice Semiconductor	Information Technology	Semiconductors	Hillsboro, Oregon	reports
LSTR	Landstar System	Industrials	Cargo Ground Transportation	Jacksonville, Florida	reports
M	Macy's	Consumer Discretionary	Broadline Retail	New York City, New York	reports
MANH	Manhattan Associates	Information Technology	Application Software	Atlanta, Georgia	reports
MAT	Mattel	Consumer Discretionary	Leisure Products	El Segundo, California	reports
MEDP	Medpace	Health Care	Life Sciences Tools & Services	Cincinnati, Ohio	reports
MIDD	Middleby	Industrials	Industrial Machinery & Supplies & Components	Elgin, Illinois	reports
MKSI	MKS Instruments	Information Technology	Semiconductor Materials & Equipment	Andover, Massachusetts	reports
MLI	Mueller Industries	Industrials	Industrial Machinery & Supplies & Components	Collierville, Tennessee	reports
MMS	Maximus Inc.	Industrials	Data Processing & Outsourced Services	Tysons, Virginia	reports
MOG.A	Moog Inc.	Industrials	Aerospace & Defense	Elma, New York	reports
MOH	Molina Healthcare	Health Care	Managed Health Care	Long Beach, California	reports
MORN	Morningstar, Inc.	Financials	Financial Exchanges & Data	Chicago, Illinois	reports
MP	MP Materials	Materials	Diversified Metals & Mining	Las Vegas, Nevada	reports
MSA	MSA Safety	Industrials	Office Services & Supplies	Cranberry Township, Pennsylvania	reports
MSM	MSC Industrial Direct	Industrials	Trading Companies & Distributors	Melville, New York Davidson, North Carolina	reports
MTDR	Matador Resources	Energy	Oil & Gas Exploration & Production	Dallas, Texas	reports
MTG	MGIC Investment Corporation	Financials	Reinsurance	Milwaukee, Wisconsin	reports
MTN	Vail Resorts	Consumer Discretionary	Hotels, Resorts & Cruise Lines	Broomfield, Colorado	reports
MTSI	MACOM Technology Solutions	Information Technology	Semiconductors	Lowell, Massachusetts	reports
MTZ	MasTec	Industrials	Construction & Engineering	Coral Gables, Florida	reports
MUR	Murphy Oil	Energy	Oil & Gas Exploration & Production	Houston, Texas	reports
MUSA	Murphy USA	Consumer Discretionary	Automotive Retail	El Dorado, Arkansas	reports
MZTI	The Marzetti Company	Consumer Staples	Packaged Foods & Meats	Westerville, Ohio	reports
NBIX	Neurocrine Biosciences	Health Care	Biotechnology	San Diego, California	reports
NEU	NewMarket Corporation	Materials	Specialty Chemicals	Richmond, Virginia	reports
NFG	National Fuel Gas	Utilities	Gas Utilities	Williamsville, New York	reports
NJR	New Jersey Resources	Utilities	Gas Utilities	Wall Township, New Jersey	reports
NLY	Annaly Capital Management	Financials	Mortgage REITs	New York City, New York	reports
NNN	NNN Reit	Real Estate	Retail REITs	Orlando, Florida	reports
NOV	NOV Inc.	Energy	Oil & Gas Equipment & Services	Houston, Texas	reports
NOVT	Novanta	Information Technology	Electronic Equipment & Instruments		reports
NTNX	Nutanix	Information Technology	Systems Software	San Jose, California	reports
NVST	Envista Holdings	Health Care	Health Care Supplies		reports
NVT	nVent Electric plc	Industrials	Electrical Components & Equipment		reports
NXST	Nexstar Media Group	Communication Services	Broadcasting	Irving, Texas	reports
NXT	Nextpower	Industrials	Electrical Components & Equipment	Fremont, California	reports
NYT	New York Times Company	Communication Services	Publishing	New York City, New York	reports
OC	Owens Corning	Industrials	Building Products	Toledo, Ohio	reports
OGE	OGE Energy	Utilities	Multi-Utilities	Oklahoma City, Oklahoma	reports
OGS	One Gas	Utilities	Gas Utilities	Tulsa, Oklahoma	reports
OHI	Omega Healthcare Investors	Real Estate	Health Care REITs		reports
OLED	Universal Display	Information Technology	Semiconductors	Ewing, New Jersey	reports
OLLI	Ollie's Bargain Outlet	Consumer Discretionary	Broadline Retail	Harrisburg, Pennsylvania	reports
ONB	Old National Bank	Financials	Regional Banks	Evansville, Indiana	reports
ONTO	Onto Innovation	Information Technology	Semiconductor Materials & Equipment	Wilmington, Massachusetts	reports
OPCH	Option Care Health	Health Care	Health Care Facilities		reports
ORA	Ormat Technologies	Utilities	Renewable Electricity	Reno, Nevada	reports
ORI	Old Republic International	Financials	Property & Casualty Insurance	Chicago, Illinois	reports
OSK	Oshkosh	Industrials	Construction Machinery & Heavy Transportation Equipment	Oshkosh, Wisconsin	reports
OVV	Ovintiv	Energy	Oil & Gas Exploration & Production	Denver, Colorado	reports
OZK	Bank OZK	Financials	Regional Banks	Little Rock, Arkansas	reports
PAG	Penske Automotive Group	Consumer Discretionary	Automotive Retail	Bloomfield Hills, Michigan	reports
PATH	UiPath	Information Technology	Systems Software	New York City, New York	reports
PB	Prosperity Bancshares	Financials	Regional Banks	Houston, Texas	reports
PBF	PBF Energy	Energy	Oil & Gas Refining & Marketing	Parsippany, New Jersey	reports
PCTY	Paylocity	Industrials	Human Resource & Employment Services	Schaumburg, Illinois	reports
PEGA	Pegasystems	Information Technology	Application Software	Waltham, Massachusetts	reports
PEN	Penumbra, Inc.	Health Care	Health Care Equipment	Alameda, California	reports
PFGC	Performance Food Group	Consumer Staples	Food Distributors	Richmond, Virginia	reports
PII	Polaris	Consumer Discretionary	Leisure Products	Medina, Minnesota	reports
PINS	Pinterest	Communication Services	Interactive Home Entertainment	San Francisco, California	reports
PK	Park Hotels & Resorts	Real Estate	Hotel & Resort REITs	Tysons, Virginia	reports
PLNT	Planet Fitness	Consumer Discretionary	Leisure Facilities	Hampton, New Hampshire	reports
PNFP	Pinnacle Financial Partners	Financials	Regional Banks	Nashville, Tennessee	reports
POR	Portland General Electric	Utilities	Electric Utilities	Portland, Oregon	reports
POST	Post Holdings	Consumer Staples	Packaged Foods & Meats	St Louis, Missouri	reports
PPC	Pilgrim's Pride	Consumer Staples	Packaged Foods & Meats	Greeley, Colorado	reports
PR	Permian Resources	Energy	Oil & Gas Exploration & Production	Midland, Texas	reports
PRI	Primerica	Financials	Life & Health Insurance	Duluth, Georgia	reports
PSN	Parsons Corporation	Industrials	Aerospace & Defense	Chantilly, Virginia	reports
PVH	PVH Corp.	Consumer Discretionary	Apparel, Accessories & Luxury Goods	New York City, New York	reports
QLYS	Qualys	Information Technology	Systems Software	Foster City, California	reports
R	Ryder	Industrials	Cargo Ground Transportation	Miami, Florida	reports
RBA	RB Global	Industrials	Diversified Support Services	Westchester, Illinois	reports
RBC	RBC Bearings	Industrials	Industrial Machinery & Supplies & Components	Oxford, Connecticut	reports
REXR	Rexford Industrial Realty	Real Estate	Industrial REITs		reports
RGA	Reinsurance Group of America	Financials	Reinsurance	Chesterfield, Missouri	reports
RGEN	Repligen	Health Care	Biotechnology	Waltham, Massachusetts	reports
RGLD	Royal Gold	Materials	Gold	Denver, Colorado	reports
RH	RH	Consumer Discretionary	Homefurnishing Retail	Corte Madera, California	reports
RLI	RLI Corp.	Financials	Property & Casualty Insurance	Peoria, Illinois	reports
RMBS	Rambus	Information Technology	Semiconductors	San Jose, California	reports
RNR	RenaissanceRe	Financials	Reinsurance	Bermuda	reports
ROIV	Roivant Sciences	Health Care	Biotechnology	London, United Kingdom	reports
RPM	RPM International	Materials	Specialty Chemicals	Medina, Ohio	reports
RRC	Range Resources	Energy	Oil & Gas Exploration & Production	Fort Worth, Texas	reports
RRX	Regal Rexnord	Industrials	Electrical Components & Equipment	Beloit, Wisconsin	reports
RS	Reliance, Inc.	Materials	Steel	Scottsdale, Arizona	reports
RYAN	Ryan Specialty	Financials	Insurance Brokers	Chicago, Illinois	reports
RYN	Rayonier	Real Estate	Timber REITs	Wildlight, Florida	reports
SAIA	Saia	Industrials	Cargo Ground Transportation	Johns Creek, Georgia	reports
SAIC	Science Applications Intl Corp	Industrials	Diversified Support Services	Reston, Virginia	reports
SANM	Sanmina Corporation	Information Technology	Electronic Manufacturing Services	San Jose, California	reports
SARO	StandardAero	Industrials	Aerospace & Defense	Scottsdale, Arizona	reports
SBRA	Sabra Health Care REIT	Real Estate	Health Care REITs		reports
SCI	Service Corp Intl	Consumer Discretionary	Specialized Consumer Services	Houston, Texas	reports
SEIC	SEI Investments Company	Financials	Asset Management & Custody Banks	Oaks, Pennsylvania	reports
SF	Stifel	Financials	Investment Banking & Brokerage	St. Louis, Missouri	reports
SFM	Sprouts Farmers Market	Consumer Staples	Food Retail	Phoenix, Arizona	reports
SGI	Somnigroup International	Consumer Discretionary	Home Furnishings	Lexington, Kentucky	reports
SHC	Sotera Health	Health Care	Health Care Services	Broadview Heights, Ohio	reports
SIGI	Selective Insurance Group	Financials	Property & Casualty Insurance		reports
SIRI	SiriusXM	Communication Services	Broadcasting	New York City, New York	reports
SITM	SiTime	Information Technology	Semiconductors	Santa Clara, California	reports
SLAB	Silicon Labs	Information Technology	Semiconductors	Austin, Texas	reports
SLGN	Silgan Holdings	Materials	Metal, Glass & Plastic Containers	Stamford, Connecticut	reports
SLM	SLM Corp	Financials	Consumer Finance	Newark, Delaware	reports
SMG	Scotts Miracle-Gro Company	Materials	Fertilizers & Agricultural Chemicals	Marysville, Ohio	reports
SMTC	Semtech	Information Technology	Semiconductors	Camarillo, California	reports
SN	SharkNinja	Consumer Discretionary	Household Appliances	Needham, Massachusetts	reports
SNX	TD Synnex	Information Technology	Technology Distributors	Fremont, California Clearwater, Florida	reports
SOLS	Solstice Advanced Materials	Materials	Specialty Chemicals	Morris Plains, New Jersey	reports
SON	Sonoco	Materials	Paper & Plastic Packaging Products & Materials	Hartsville, South Carolina	reports
SPXC	SPX Technologies	Industrials	Industrial Machinery & Supplies & Components	Charlotte, North Carolina	reports
SR	Spire	Utilities	Gas Utilities	St. Louis, Missouri	reports
SSB	South State Bank	Financials	Regional Banks	Winter Haven, Florida	reports
SSD	Simpson Manufacturing	Industrials	Building Products	Pleasanton, California	reports
ST	Sensata Technologies	Industrials	Electrical Components & Equipment	Attleboro, Massachusetts	reports
STAG	STAG Industrial	Real Estate	Industrial REITs	Boston, Massachusetts	reports
STRL	Sterling Infrastructure	Industrials	Construction & Engineering	The Woodlands, Texas	reports
STWD	Starwood Property Trust	Financials	Mortgage REITs	Greenwich, Connecticut	reports
SUI	Sun Communities	Real Estate	Single-Family Residential REITs	Southfield, Michigan	reports
SWX	Southwest Gas Corp	Utilities	Gas Utilities	Las Vegas, Nevada	reports
SYNA	Synaptics	Information Technology	Semiconductors	San Jose, California	reports
TCBI	Texas Capital Bancshares	Financials	Regional Banks	Dallas, Texas	reports
TEX	Terex	Industrials	Construction Machinery & Heavy Transportation Equipment	Norwalk, Connecticut	reports
THC	Tenet Health	Health Care	Health Care Facilities	Dallas, Texas	reports
THG	Hanover Insurance	Financials	Property & Casualty Insurance	Worcester, Massachusetts	reports
THO	Thor Industries	Consumer Discretionary	Leisure Products	Elkhart, Indiana	reports
TKR	Timken	Industrials	Industrial Machinery & Supplies & Components	North Canton, Ohio	reports
TLN	Talen Energy	Utilities	Independent Power Producers & Energy Traders	Houston, Texas	reports
TNL	Travel + Leisure Co.	Consumer Discretionary	Hotels, Resorts & Cruise Lines	Orlando, Florida	reports
TOL	Toll Brothers	Consumer Discretionary	Homebuilding	Fort Washington, Pennsylvania	reports
TOST	Toast, Inc.	Financials	Transaction & Payment Processing Services	Boston, Massachusetts	reports
TREX	Trex	Industrials	Building Products	Winchester, Virginia	reports
TRU	TransUnion	Industrials	Research & Consulting Services	Chicago, Illinois	reports
TTC	Toro	Industrials	Agricultural & Farm Machinery	Bloomington, Minnesota	reports
TTEK	Tetra Tech	Industrials	Construction & Engineering	Pasadena, California	reports
TTMI	TTM Technologies	Information Technology	Electronic Manufacturing Services	Santa Ana, California	reports
TXNM	TXNM Energy	Utilities	Electric Utilities	Albuquerque, New Mexico	reports
TXRH	Texas Roadhouse	Consumer Discretionary	Restaurants	Louisville, Kentucky	reports
UBSI	United Bankshares	Financials	Regional Banks	Charleston, West Virginia	reports
UFPI	UFP Industries	Industrials	Building Products	Grand Rapids, Michigan	reports
UGI	UGI Corp	Utilities	Gas Utilities	King of Prussia, Pennsylvania	reports
ULS	UL Solutions	Industrials	Research & Consulting Services	Northbrook, Illinois	reports
UMBF	UMB Financial Corp.	Financials	Regional Banks	Kansas City, Missouri	reports
UNM	Unum	Financials	Life & Health Insurance	Chattanooga, Tennessee	reports
USFD	US Foods	Consumer Staples	Food Distributors	Rosemont, Illinois	reports
UTHR	United Therapeutics	Health Care	Biotechnology		reports
VAL	Valaris	Energy	Oil & Gas Drilling	Houston, Texas	reports
VC	Visteon	Consumer Discretionary	Automotive Parts & Equipment	Van Buren Township, Michigan	reports
VFC	VF Corporation	Consumer Discretionary	Apparel, Accessories & Luxury Goods	Denver, Colorado	reports
VIAV	Viavi Solutions	Information Technology	Communications Equipment	Chandler, Arizona	reports
VICR	Vicor Corporation	Industrials	Electrical Components & Equipment	Andover, Massachusetts	reports
VLY	Valley Bank	Financials	Regional Banks	Morristown, New Jersey	reports
VMI	Valmont Industries	Industrials	Industrial Machinery & Supplies & Components	Omaha, Nebraska	reports
VNO	Vornado Realty Trust	Real Estate	Office REITs	New York City, New York	reports
VNOM	Viper Energy	Energy	Oil & Gas Storage & Transportation	Midland, Texas	reports
VNT	Vontier	Information Technology	Electronic Equipment & Instruments	Raleigh, North Carolina	reports
VOYA	Voya Financial	Financials	Multi-Sector Holdings	New York City, New York	reports
VVV	Valvoline	Consumer Discretionary	Automotive Retail	Lexington, Kentucky	reports
WAL	Western Alliance Bancorporation	Financials	Regional Banks	Phoenix, Arizona	reports
WCC	WESCO International	Industrials	Trading Companies & Distributors	Pittsburgh, Pennsylvania	reports
WEX	WEX Inc.	Financials	Transaction & Payment Processing Services	South Portland, Maine	reports
WFRD	Weatherford International	Energy	Oil & Gas Equipment & Services	Houston, Texas	reports
WH	Wyndham Hotels & Resorts	Consumer Discretionary	Hotels, Resorts & Cruise Lines	Parsippany, New Jersey	reports
WHR	Whirlpool Corporation	Consumer Discretionary	Household Appliances	Benton Harbor, Michigan	reports
WING	Wingstop	Consumer Discretionary	Restaurants	Addison, Texas	reports
WLK	Westlake Corporation	Materials	Specialty Chemicals	Houston, Texas	reports
WMG	Warner Music Group	Communication Services	Movies & Entertainment	New York City, New York	reports
WMS	Advanced Drainage Systems	Industrials	Building Products	Hilliard, Ohio	reports
WPC	W. P. Carey	Real Estate	Diversified REITs	New York City, New York	reports
WSO	Watsco	Industrials	Trading Companies & Distributors	Miami, Florida	reports
WTFC	Wintrust Financial	Financials	Regional Banks	Rosemont, Illinois	reports
WTRG	Essential Utilities	Utilities	Water Utilities	Bryn Mawr, Pennsylvania	reports
WTS	Watts Water Technologies	Industrials	Building Products	North Andover, Massachusetts	reports
WWD	Woodward, Inc.	Industrials	Electrical Components & Equipment	Fort Collins, Colorado	reports
XPO	XPO, Inc.	Industrials	Cargo Ground Transportation	Greenwich, Connecticut	reports
XRAY	Dentsply Sirona	Health Care	Health Care Supplies	Charlotte, North Carolina	reports
YETI	Yeti Holdings	Consumer Discretionary	Leisure Products	Austin, Texas	reports
ZION	Zions Bancorporation	Financials	Regional Banks	Salt Lake City, Utah	reports

== Selected past and announced changes to the list of S&P 400 components ==
S&P Dow Jones Indices updates the components of the S&P 400 periodically, typically in response to acquisitions, or to keep the index up to date as various companies grow or shrink in value.

Date	Added		Removed		Reason
Date	Ticker	Security	Ticker	Security	Reason
November 18, 2026	CHYM	Chime Financial	NWE	NorthWestern Energy	S&P MidCap 400 constituent Black Hills Corp. acquired NorthWestern Energy Group. Post-merger, the combined company was renamed Bright Horizon Energy Corp.
November 11, 2026	JHX	James Hardie Industries	ROKU	Roku, Inc.	S&P 500 constituent Fox Corporation acquired Roku.
November 4, 2026	GKOS	Glaukos	OKTA	Okta, Inc.	Market capitalization change.
October 6, 2026	FORM	FormFactor	TWLO	Twilio	Market capitalization change.
October 6, 2026	CTVA	Corteva	OLN	Olin Corporation	Market capitalization change.
September 21, 2026	HUBS	HubSpot	SAM	Boston Beer Company	Market capitalization change.
September 21, 2026	AGNC	AGNC Investment	CPRI	Capri Holdings	Market capitalization change.
September 21, 2026	CORT	Corcept Therapeutics	P	Everpure	Market capitalization change.
September 21, 2026	EAT	Brinker International	ILMN	Illumina, Inc.	Market capitalization change.
August 20, 2026	SUI	Sun Communities	WBS	Webster Bank	Banco Santander S.A. acquired Webster Financial.
July 24, 2026	KRYS	Krystal Biotech	TMHC	Taylor Morrison	S&P 500 & 100 constituent Berkshire Hathaway acquired Taylor Morrison Home.
July 22, 2026	MOH	Molina Healthcare	NSA	National Storage Affiliates Trust	S&P 500 constituent Public Storage acquired National Storage Affiliates Trust.
July 17, 2026	BTSG	BrightSpring Health Services	GTLS	Chart Industries	S&P 500 constituent Baker Hughes Co. acquired Chart Industries.
July 6, 2026	ALSN	Allison Transmission	GT	Goodyear Tire & Rubber	Market capitalization change.
July 1, 2026	TOST	Toast, Inc.	BLD	TopBuild Corp.	QXO, Inc. acquired TopBuild Corp.
July 1, 2026	IESC	IES Holdings	JHG	Janus Henderson	Janus Henderson taken private by Trian Fund Management, L.P., General Catalyst Group Management, LLC, and Qatar Investment Authority.
June 22, 2026	ROKU	Roku, Inc.	FLEX	Flex Ltd.	Market capitalization change.
June 22, 2026	CDE	Coeur Mining	BRBR	BellRing Brands	Market capitalization change.
June 22, 2026	SMTC	Semtech	COTY	Coty	Market capitalization change.
June 22, 2026	SANM	Sanmina Corporation	CNXC	Concentrix	Market capitalization change.
June 22, 2026	VIAV	Viavi Solutions	BLKB	Blackbaud	Market capitalization change.
June 11, 2026	SIRI	SiriusXM	MASI	Masimo	S&P 500 & 100 constituent Danaher Corporation acquired Masimo.
May 18, 2026	SN	SharkNinja	FLO	Flowers Foods	Market capitalization change.
April 9, 2026	DOCN	DigitalOcean	CASY	Casey's	Market capitalization change.
March 23, 2026	SOLS	Solstice Advanced Materials	LITE	Lumentum	Market capitalization change.
March 23, 2026	SITM	SiTime	COHR	Coherent Corp.	Market capitalization change.
March 23, 2026	MOG.A	Moog Inc.	SATS	EchoStar	Market capitalization change.
March 23, 2026	IDCC	InterDigital	GTM	ZoomInfo	Market capitalization change.
March 23, 2026	VICR	Vicor Corporation	ASGN	ASGN Inc.	Market capitalization change.
March 23, 2026	CTRE	CareTrust REIT	KMPR	Kemper Corporation	Market capitalization change.
February 9, 2026	ARWR	Arrowhead Pharmaceuticals	CIEN	Ciena	Market capitalization change.
February 2, 2026	BROS	Dutch Bros Inc.	PCH	PotlatchDeltic	S&P MidCap 400 constituent Rayonier Inc. acquired PotlatchDeltic.
February 2, 2026	AEIS	Advanced Energy	CMA	Comerica	S&P 500 constituent Fifth Third Bancorp acquired Comerica.
February 2, 2026	AHR	American Healthcare REIT	CADE	Cadence Bank	S&P 500 constituent Huntington Bancshares Inc. acquired Cadence Bank.
January 30, 2026	TTMI	TTM Technologies	CIVI	Civitas Resources	S&P SmallCap 600 constituent SM Energy Company acquired Civitas Resources.
January 22, 2026	SARO	StandardAero	FYBR	Frontier Communications	S&P 500 & S&P 100 constituent Verizon Communications Inc. acquired Frontier Communications Parent.
January 2, 2026	PATH	UiPath	SNV	Synovus	S&P MidCap 400 constituent Pinnacle Financial Partners Inc. acquired Synovus Financial Corp.
December 22, 2025	ULS	UL Solutions	FIX	Comfort Systems USA	Market capitalization change.
December 22, 2025	PINS	Pinterest	UAA/UA	Under Armour	Market capitalization change.
December 22, 2025	BAH	Booz Allen Hamilton	POWI	Power Integrations	Market capitalization change.
December 22, 2025	SPXC	SPX Technologies	PRGO	Perrigo	Market capitalization change.
December 22, 2025	DY	Dycom Industries	IRDM	Iridium Communications	Market capitalization change.
December 22, 2025	BWA	BorgWarner	VAC	Marriott Vacations Worldwide	Market capitalization change.
December 22, 2025	HL	Hecla Mining	NSP	Insperity	Market capitalization change.
December 17, 2025	CRBG	Corebridge Financial	ALE	Allete, Inc.	Canada Pension Plan Investment Board and Global Infrastructure Partners acquired Allete.
November 13, 2025	STRL	Sterling Infrastructure	LNW	Light & Wonder	Light & Wonder delisted from the NASDAQ Stock Exchange but kept its primary listing exclusively in Australia.
October 6, 2025	BSY	Bentley Systems	WU	Western Union	Market capitalization change.
September 22, 2025	KTOS	Kratos Defense & Security Solutions	MAN	ManpowerGroup	Market capitalization change.
September 22, 2025	MP	MP Materials	ACHC	Acadia Healthcare	Market capitalization change.
September 22, 2025	TRU	TransUnion	WEN	Wendy's	Market capitalization change.
September 22, 2025	NTNX	Nutanix	EME	Emcor	Market capitalization change.
September 12, 2025	FTI	TechnipFMC	SKX	Skechers	3G Capital acquired Skechers USA.
September 2, 2025	ELAN	Elanco	SRPT	Sarepta Therapeutics	Market capitalization change.
August 28, 2025	TLN	Talen Energy	IBKR	Interactive Brokers	Market capitalization change.
August 19, 2025	TWLO	Twilio	AMED	Amedisys	S&P 500 and S&P 100 constituent UnitedHealth Group acquired Amedisys.
July 18, 2025	AVAV	AeroVironment	CHX	ChampionX	S&P 500 constituent Schlumberger Ltd. acquired ChampionX.
June 24, 2025	APG	APi Group	X	U.S. Steel	Nippon Steel Corp. acquired United States Steel.
May 22, 2025	PEGA	Pegasystems	JWN	Nordstrom	The Nordstrom family and El Puerto de Liverpool acquired Nordstrom.
May 1, 2025	OKTA	Okta, Inc.	BERY	Berry Global	S&P 500 constituent Amcor plc acquired Berry Global Group.
March 31, 2025	CAVA	Cava Group	ALTR	Altair Engineering	Siemens AG acquired Altair Engineering.
March 24, 2025	VFC	VF Corporation	TKO	TKO Group Holdings	Market capitalization change.
March 24, 2025	ALK	Alaska Air Group	WSM	Williams-Sonoma, Inc.	Market capitalization change.
March 24, 2025	HIMS	Hims & Hers Health	EXE	Expand Energy	Market capitalization change.
March 24, 2025	BBWI	Bath & Body Works, Inc.	CC	Chemours	Market capitalization change.
March 24, 2025	ATI	ATI Inc.	TDC	Teradata	Market capitalization change.
March 24, 2025	SATS	EchoStar	NEOG	Neogen	Market capitalization change.
March 11, 2025	ACI	Albertsons	AZPN	Aspen Technology	S&P 500 constituent Emerson Electric acquired Aspen Technology.
March 6, 2025	ENTG	Entegris	ALTM	Arcadium Lithium	Rio Tinto acquired Arcadium Lithium.
January 27, 2025	GWRE	Guidewire Software	ARWR	Arrowhead Pharmaceuticals	Market capitalization change.
January 14, 2025	CART	Maplebear Inc.	ENOV	Enovis	Market capitalization change.
December 23, 2024	CMA	Comerica	VSH	Vishay Intertechnology	Market capitalization change.
December 23, 2024	CRS	Carpenter Technology	CRI	Carter's	Market capitalization change.
December 23, 2024	BILL	BILL Holdings	LII	Lennox International	Market capitalization change.
November 26, 2024	MLI	Mueller Industries	TPL	Texas Pacific Land Corporation	Market capitalization change.
November 25, 2024	FLEX	Flex Ltd.	AZTA	Azenta	Market capitalization change.
November 20, 2024	FOUR	Shift4	RCM	R1 RCM	TowerBrook Capital Partners and Clayton, Dubilier & Rice acquired R1 RCM.
November 6, 2024	CHWY	Chewy	SRCL	Stericycle	S&P 500 constituent Waste Management, Inc. acquired Stericycle.
October 11, 2024	DOCU	Docusign	MDU	MDU Resources	Market capitalization change.
October 1, 2024	ENSG	Ensign Group	SWN	Southwestern Energy	S&P MidCap 400 constituent Chesapeake Energy Corp. acquired Southwestern Energy. The combined company renamed to Expand Energy Corporation.
September 23, 2024	BIO	Bio-Rad Laboratories	ERIE	Erie Indemnity	Market capitalization change.
September 23, 2024	CNH	CNH Industrial	MP	MP Materials	Market capitalization change.
September 23, 2024	WAL	Western Alliance Bancorporation	PGNY	Progyny	Market capitalization change.
September 23, 2024	PSN	Parsons Corporation	ADNT	Adient	Market capitalization change.
September 23, 2024	HLNE	Hamilton Lane	WOLF	Wolfspeed	Market capitalization change.
September 23, 2024	VNOM	Viper Energy	HELE	Helen of Troy Limited	Market capitalization change.
September 23, 2024	FN	Fabrinet	ZD	Ziff Davis	Market capitalization change.
September 23, 2024	AAL	American Airlines Group	TGNA	Tegna Inc.	Market capitalization change.
July 26, 2024	AVTR	Avantor	QDEL	QuidelOrtho	Market capitalization change.
July 22, 2024	ANF	Abercrombie & Fitch	ETRN	Equitrans Midstream	S&P 500 constituent EQT Corporation acquired Equitrans Midstream.
June 28, 2024	RYAN	Ryan Specialty	AIRC	Apartment Income REIT	Blackstone Inc. acquired Apartment Income REIT.
June 24, 2024	TPL	Texas Pacific Land Corporation	WERN	Werner Enterprises	Market capitalization change.
June 24, 2024	BMRN	BioMarin Pharmaceutical	IART	Integra LifeSciences	Market capitalization change.
June 24, 2024	WMG	Warner Music Group	PENN	Penn Entertainment	Market capitalization change.
June 24, 2024	NXT	Nextracker	GO	Grocery Outlet	Market capitalization change.
June 24, 2024	ALTR	Altair Engineering	LEG	Leggett & Platt	Market capitalization change.
June 24, 2024	RBA	RB Global	HTZ	Hertz	Market capitalization change.
June 24, 2024	ILMN	Illumina, Inc.	GDDY	GoDaddy	Market capitalization change.
June 3, 2024	SRPT	Sarepta Therapeutics	SWAV	Shockwave Medical	S&P 500 constituent Johnson & Johnson acquired Shockwave Medical.
May 3, 2024	AAON	AAON	VST	Vistra	Market capitalization change.
April 22, 2024	DUOL	Duolingo	CABO	Cable One	Market capitalization change.
April 3, 2024	XRAY	Dentsply Sirona	FOXF	Fox Factory	Market capitalization change.
April 1, 2024	ROIV	Roivant Sciences	RUN	Sunrun	Market capitalization change.
April 1, 2024	APPF	AppFolio	NARI	Inari Medical	Market capitalization change.
March 18, 2024	WHR	Whirlpool	SMCI	Supermicro	Market capitalization change.
March 18, 2024	ZION	Zions Bancorporation	DECK	Deckers Brands	Market capitalization change.
March 18, 2024	CYTK	Cytokinetics	CALX	Calix	Market capitalization change.
March 18, 2024	AIT	Applied Industrial Technologies	MPW	Medical Properties Trust	Market capitalization change.
March 1, 2024	AMH	American Homes 4 Rent	DOC	Physicians Realty Trust	S&P 500 constituent Healthpeak Properties acquired Physicians Realty Trust.
January 23, 2024	ELF	e.l.f. Beauty	SRC	Spirit Realty	S&P 500 constituent Realty Income acquired Spirit Realty Capital.
January 5, 2024	PSTG	Pure Storage	PDCO	Patterson Companies	Market capitalization change.
January 2, 2024	ALTM	Arcadium Lithium	VYX	NCR Voyix	Market capitalization change.
December 18, 2023	RMBS	Rambus	JBL	Jabil	Market capitalization change.
December 18, 2023	FIX	Comfort Systems USA	BLDR	Builders FirstSource	Market capitalization change.
December 18, 2023	HLI	Houlihan Lokey	MODG	Topgolf Callaway Brands	Market capitalization change.
December 18, 2023	EQH	Equitable Holdings	VSTS	Vestis	Market capitalization change.
November 30, 2023	CG	Carlyle Group	ICUI	ICU Medical	Market capitalization change.
November 30, 2023	WPC	W. P. Carey	WOR	Worthington Industries	Market capitalization change.
November 13, 2023	CNM	Core & Main	ACIW	ACI Worldwide	Market capitalization change.
November 7, 2023	BURL	Burlington Stores	ENV	Envestnet	Market capitalization change.
October 20, 2023	FND	Floor & Decor	VICR	Vicor	Market capitalization change.
October 18, 2023	ONTO	Onto Innovation	HUBB	Hubbell Incorporated	Market capitalization change.
October 12, 2023	H	Hyatt	NATI	National Instruments	S&P 500 constituent Emerson Electric acquired National Instruments.
October 3, 2023			KSS	Kohl's	Market capitalization change.
October 2, 2023	VSTS	Vestis			S&P MidCap 400 constituent Aramark spun off Vestis.
September 29, 2023	CIVI	Civitas Resources	SYNH	Syneos Health	Elliott Investment Management acquired Syneos Health.
September 18, 2023	RBC	RBC Bearings	HE	Hawaiian Electric Industries	Market capitalization change.
September 18, 2023	FNF	Fidelity National Financial	FL	Foot Locker	Market capitalization change.
September 18, 2023	WFRD	Weatherford International	JBLU	JetBlue	Market capitalization change.
September 18, 2023	ST	Sensata Technologies	TRIP	Tripadvisor	Market capitalization change.
September 18, 2023	MTN	Vail Resorts	HIW	Highwoods Properties	Market capitalization change.
September 18, 2023	VST	Vistra Corp	XRX	Xerox	Market capitalization change.
September 18, 2023	ALLY	Ally Financial	ENR	Energizer	Market capitalization change.
September 18, 2023	MORN	Morningstar, Inc.	CATY	Cathay Bank	Market capitalization change.
September 18, 2023	GDDY	GoDaddy	SXT	Sensient Technologies	Market capitalization change.
September 18, 2023	GLPI	Gaming and Leisure Properties	PZZA	Papa John's	Market capitalization change.
September 18, 2023	PR	Permian Resources	OMCL	Omnicell	Market capitalization change.
August 22, 2023	DLB	Dolby	STAA	STAAR Surgical	Market capitalization change.
August 21, 2023	CHK	Chesapeake Energy	MRCY	Mercury Systems	Market capitalization change.
August 8, 2023	ERIE	Erie Indemnity	PDCE	PDC Energy	S&P 500 & 100 constituent Chevron Corp. acquired PDC Energy.
August 4, 2023	PAG	Penske Automotive	UNVR	Univar Solutions	Apollo Global Management acquired Univar Solutions.
July 24, 2023	ELS	Equity Lifestyle Properties	LSI	Life Storage	S&P 500 constituent Extra Space Storage acquired Life Storage.
June 19, 2023	WCC	WESCO International	NAVI	Navient	Market capitalization change.
June 19, 2023	ZI	ZoomInfo	SITM	SiTime	Market capitalization change.
June 19, 2023	OVV	Ovintiv	MAC	Macerich	Market capitalization change.
June 19, 2023	GPK	Graphic Packaging	VSCO (now VSXY)	Victoria's Secret	Market capitalization change.
June 19, 2023	DBX	Dropbox	DEI	Douglas Emmett	Market capitalization change.
June 19, 2023	CCK	Crown Holdings	FULT	Fulton Financial Corporation	Market capitalization change.
June 19, 2023	PLNT	Planet Fitness	NGVT	Ingevity Corp.	Market capitalization change.
June 19, 2023	BWXT	BWX Technologies	SPWR	SunPower	Market capitalization change.
June 19, 2023	BERY	Berry Global	WLY	John Wiley & Sons	Market capitalization change.
June 19, 2023	DOCS	Doximity	DAN	Dana Incorporated	Market capitalization change.
June 1, 2023	KNF	Knife River Corporation	BOH	Bank of Hawaii	S&P MidCap 400 constituent MDU Resources Group Inc. (NYSE:MDU) spun off Knife River Corp. Bank of Hawaii moved due to market capitalization change.
May 4, 2023	STAG	STAG Industrial	AXON	Axon Enterprise	Market capitalization change.
April 5, 2023			PACW	PacWest Bancorp	Market capitalization change.
April 4, 2023	CR	Crane (new)			S&P MidCap 400 constituent Crane Holdings Co. (NYSE:CR) spun off new Crane. Following the spin-off, the parent Crane Holdings Co. will have a name change to Crane NXT Co., a symbol change to CXT, and will remain in the S&P MidCap 400.
March 22, 2023	EXPO	Exponent	IAA	IAA, Inc.	Ritchie Bros. Auctioneers acquired IAA.
March 20, 2023	AXTA	Axalta	SLG	SL Green Realty	Market capitalization change.
March 20, 2023	VAL	Valaris	FICO	Fair Isaac	Market capitalization change.
March 20, 2023	ALV	Autoliv	CBRL	Cracker Barrel	Market capitalization change.
March 20, 2023	STWD	Starwood Property Trust	VSAT	Viasat	Market capitalization change.
March 20, 2023	SSB	South State Bank	WAFD	WaFd, Inc.	Market capitalization change.
March 20, 2023	CHRD	Chord Energy	DY	Dycom Industries	Market capitalization change.
March 20, 2023	WMS	Advanced Drainage Systems	KMT	Kennametal	Market capitalization change.
March 20, 2023	HGV	Hilton Grand Vacations	JBGS	JBG Smith	Market capitalization change.
March 20, 2023	HTZ	Hertz	PEB	Pebblebrook Hotel Trust	Market capitalization change.
March 20, 2023	ARMK	Aramark	HBI	Hanesbrands	Market capitalization change.
March 20, 2023	USFD	US Foods	TNDM	Tandem Diabetes Care	Market capitalization change.
March 1, 2023	COLB	Columbia Banking System	UMPQ	Umpqua Bank	Columbia Banking System acquired Umpqua Bank.
February 23, 2023	UFPI	UFP Industries	LHCG	LHC Group	S&P 500 constituent UnitedHealth Group acquired LHC Group.
February 6, 2023	ADC	Agree Realty	STOR	Store Capital	Store Capital was acquired by GIC and Oak Street Capital.
January 5, 2023	VNO	Vornado Realty Trust	RXO	RXO	Market capitalization change.
December 22, 2022	SMCI	Supermicro	STLD	Steel Dynamics	Market capitalization change.
December 19, 2022	FBIN	Fortune Brands Innovations	FSLR	First Solar	Market capitalization change.
December 19, 2022	ALGM	Allegro Microsystems	SMTC	Semtech	Market capitalization change.
December 19, 2022	CUBE	CubeSmart	NUVA	NuVasive	Market capitalization change.
December 1, 2022	PBF	PBF Energy	NUS	Nu Skin Enterprises	Market capitalization change.
December 1, 2022	NXST	Nexstar Media Group	SABR	Sabre	Market capitalization change.
November 2, 2022			BFH	Bread Financial	Market capitalization change.
November 1, 2022	RXO	RXO			S&P MidCap 400 constituent XPO, Inc. spun off RXO.
October 20, 2022	AR	Antero Resources	Y	Alleghany	S&P 500 constituent Berkshire Hathaway acquired Alleghany.
October 18, 2022	WLK	Westlake	MLKN	MillerKnoll	Market capitalization change.
October 12, 2022	LNTH	Lantheus Holdings	TRGP	Targa Resources	Market capitalization change.
October 3, 2022	FYBR	Frontier Communications	HAIN	Hain Celestial Group	Market capitalization change.
October 3, 2022	EXLS	EXL Service	EQT	EQT Corporation	Market capitalization change.
September 19, 2022	PVH	PVH Corp.	HPP	Hudson Pacific Properties	Market capitalization change.
September 19, 2022	PENN	Penn Entertainment	MCY	Mercury General	Market capitalization change.
September 19, 2022	DT	Dynatrace	AEO	American Eagle Outfitters	Market capitalization change.
September 19, 2022	NLY	Annaly Capital Management	MTX	Minerals Technologies	Market capitalization change.
August 17, 2022	MTSI	MACOM Technology Solutions	SAIL	SailPoint Technologies	Thoma Bravo acquired SailPoint Technologies Holdings.
August 10, 2022	CELH	Celsius Holdings	ACC	American Campus Communities	Blackstone Inc. acquired American Campus Communities.
July 27, 2022	MP	MP Materials	SAFM	Sanderson Farms	Cargill and Continental Grain Co. acquired Sanderson Farms.
July 26, 2022	NOVT	Novanta	SIX	Six Flags	Market capitalization change.
July 21, 2022	HTA	Healthcare Trust of America	HR	Healthcare Realty Trust	Healthcare Trust of America acquired Healthcare Realty Trust. Post-merger, Healthcare Trust of America changed its name and symbol to Healthcare Realty Trust Inc. (NYSE: HR).
July 20, 2022	COKE	Coca-Cola Consolidated	PSB	PS Business Parks	Blackstone Inc. acquired PS Business Parks.
July 7, 2022	ORA	Ormat Technologies	CCMP	CMC Materials	Entegris acquired CMC Materials.
July 6, 2022	SWN	Southwestern Energy	CDK	CDK Global	Brookfield Business Partners acquired CDK Global in a tender offer.
July 5, 2022	OMCL	Omnicell	COHR	Coherent	S&P MidCap 400 constituent II-VI Inc. acquired Coherent.
June 29, 2022	POR	Portland General Electric	APPS	Digital Turbine	Market capitalization change.
June 21, 2022	UA/UAA	Under Armour	TRN	Trinity Industries	Market capitalization change.
June 21, 2022	IPGP	IPG Photonics	YELP	Yelp	Market capitalization change.
June 21, 2022	SHC	Sotera Health	URBN	Urban Outfitters	Market capitalization change.
June 21, 2022	SWAV	Shockwave Medical	RAMP	LiveRamp	Market capitalization change.
May 19, 2022	IRT	IRT Living	MIME	Mimecast	Permira Holdings Ltd. acquired Mimecast.
May 3, 2022	NARI	Inari Medical	TPH	Tri Pointe Homes	Market capitalization change.
April 6, 2022			PRG	PROG Holdings	Market capitalization change.
April 5, 2022	ESAB	ESAB			S&P MidCap 400 constituent Colfax Corp. spun off ESAB.
April 4, 2022	MTDR	Matador Resources	CPT	Camden	Market capitalization change.
March 30, 2022	GTLS	Chart Industries	CONE	CyrusOne	Global Infrastructure Partners acquired CyrusOne.
March 14, 2022	BRBR	BellRing Brands	CRNC	Cerence	Market capitalization change.
March 2, 2022	RRC	Range Resources	MOH	Molina Healthcare	Market capitalization change.
February 18, 2022	ONB	Old National	UE	Urban Edge Properties	Market capitalization change.
February 15, 2022	PDCE	PDC Energy	NDSN	Nordson	Market capitalization change.
February 3, 2022	GPS	Gap	JACK	Jack in the Box	Market capitalization change.
February 1, 2022	EEFT	Euronet Worldwide	CMP	Compass Minerals	Market capitalization change.
February 1, 2022	WTS	Watts Water Technologies	STL	Sterling Bancorp	Webster Bank acquired Sterling Bancorp.
January 4, 2022	CALX	Calix	CIT	CIT Group	First Citizens BancShares acquired CIT Group.
December 28, 2021	VOYA	Voya Financial	COR	CoreSite	S&P 500/100 constituent American Tower acquired CoreSite Realty.
December 20, 2021	AA	Alcoa	HRC	Hillrom	S&P 500 constituent Baxter International acquired Hill-Rom.
December 20, 2021	LEG	Leggett & Platt	SBNY	Signature Bank	Market capitalization change.
December 20, 2021	HBI	Hanesbrands	SEDG	SolarEdge	Market capitalization change.
December 20, 2021	WU	Western Union	FDS	FactSet	Market capitalization change.
December 20, 2021	M	Macy's	TR	Tootsie Roll	Market capitalization change.
December 20, 2021	VICR	Vicor	TDS	Telephone and Data Systems	Market capitalization change.
December 20, 2021	POWI	Power Integrations	NKTR	Nektar Therapeutics	Market capitalization change.
December 2, 2021	BRKR	Bruker	KAR	KAR Auction Services	Market capitalization change.
November 30, 2021	SITM	SiTime	EBS	Emergent BioSolutions	Market capitalization change.
November 5, 2021	KD	Kyndryl	NTCT	NetScout Systems	S&P 500 and 100 constituent IBM spun off Kyndryl Holdings.
October 22, 2021	KRG	Kite Realty Group Trust	TREE	LendingTree	Market capitalization change.
October 5, 2021	SPWR	SunPower	XEC	Cimarex Energy	S&P 500 constituent Cabot Oil & Gas acquired Cimarex Energy.
September 20, 2021	UNM	Unum	CDAY	Ceridian	Market capitalization change.
September 20, 2021	NOV	NOV Inc.	BRO	Brown & Brown	Market capitalization change.
September 20, 2021	PRGO	Perrigo	WW	WW International	Market capitalization change.
September 20, 2021	TNDM	Tandem Diabetes Care	HCSG	Healthcare Services Group	Market capitalization change.
September 7, 2021	APPS	Digital Turbine	LGND	Ligand Pharmaceuticals	Market capitalization change.
September 3, 2021	PFGC	Performance Food Group	THS	TreeHouse Foods	Market capitalization change.
August 30, 2021	SAIA	Saia	TECH	Bio-Techne	Market capitalization change.
August 30, 2021	MIME	Mimecast	CNK	Cinemark Holdings	Market capitalization change.
August 30, 2021	OPCH	Option Care Health	TRMK	Trustmark Corporation	Market capitalization change.
August 4, 2021	VSCO (now VSXY)	Victoria's Secret	INT	World Fuel Services	S&P 500 constituent L Brands spun off Victoria's Secret.
August 4, 2021	GME	GameStop	WRI	Weingarten Realty	S&P 500 constituent Kimco Realty acquired Weingarten Realty.
August 3, 2021			STRA	Strategic Education, Inc.	Market capitalization change.
August 2, 2021	GXO	GXO Logistics			Spun off from XPO, Inc.
July 7, 2021	CRNC	Cerence	ATGE	Adtalem Global Education	Market capitalization change.
July 2, 2021	DTM	DT Midstream	PRAH	PRA Health Sciences	ICON plc acquired PRA Health Sciences.
June 15, 2021	ELY	Callaway Golf	GRUB	Grubhub	Just Eat Takeaway.com NV acquired GrubHub.
June 9, 2021	TRGP	Targa Resources	CLGX	CoreLogic	Stone Point Capital and Insight Partners acquired CoreLogic.
June 9, 2021	ENV	Envestnet	TCF	TCF Financial Corporation	S&P 500 constituent Huntington Bancshares acquired TCF Financial Corporation.
June 4, 2021	HFC	HollyFrontier	SVC	Service Properties Trust	Market capitalization change.
June 2, 2021	CROX	Crocs	CMD	Cantel Medical Corporation	S&P 500 constituent STERIS plc acquired Cantel Medical.
May 17, 2021	AZPN	Aspen Technology	AVNS	Avanos Medical	Market capitalization change.
May 14, 2021	NSA	National Storage Affiliates Trust	CRL	Charles River Laboratories	Charles River Laboratories replaced FLIR Systems in the S&P 500.
May 7, 2021	RCM	R1 RCM	PRSP	Perspecta Inc.	Veritas Capital acquired Perspecta.
May 3, 2021	G	Genpact	GNW	Genworth Financial	Market capitalization change.
April 20, 2021	LSCC	Lattice Semiconductor	PTC	PTC Inc.	PTC replaced Varian Medical Systems in the S&P 500.
April 20, 2021	PGNY	Progyny Inc.	UFS	Domtar	Market capitalization change.
April 12, 2021	NVST	Envista Holdings	IDCC	InterDigital	Market capitalization change.
March 30, 2021	NBIX	Neurocrine Biosciences	OI	O-I Glass	Market capitalization change.
March 22, 2021	FLS	Flowserve	EPC	Edgewell Personal Care	Market capitalization change.
March 22, 2021	SLG	SL Green Realty	PENN	Penn National Gaming	Market capitalization change.
March 22, 2021	XRX	Xerox	GNRC	Generac Holdings	Market capitalization change.
March 22, 2021	VNT	Vontier	CZR	Caesars Entertainment	Market capitalization change.
March 1, 2021	CLF	Cleveland-Cliffs	EV	Eaton Vance	S&P 500/100 constituent Morgan Stanley acquired Eaton Vance.
February 16, 2021	AMKR	Amkor Technology	HNI	HNI Corporation	Market capitalization change.
February 12, 2021	IRDM	Iridium Communications	MPWR	Monolithic Power Systems	Monolithic Power Systems replaced TechnipFMC in the S&P 500.
January 29, 2021	STAA	STAAR Surgical	PBH	Prestige Brands	Market capitalization change.
January 21, 2021	YETI	Yeti Holdings	TRMB	Trimble Inc.	Trimble Inc. replaced Concho Resources in the S&P 500.
January 7, 2021	CPRI	Capri Holdings	ENPH	Enphase Energy	Market capitalization change.
January 7, 2021	BRKS	Brooks Automation	WPX	WPX Energy	S&P 500 constituent Devon Energy acquired WPX Energy.
December 29, 2020	KNSL	Kinsale Capital Group	TCO	Taubman Centers	S&P 500/100 constituent Simon Property Group acquired Taubman Centers.
December 21, 2020	AIRC	Apartment Income REIT	DNKN	Dunkin' Brands	Inspire Brands acquired Dunkin' Brands Group.
December 2, 2020			AMCX	AMC Networks	Market capitalization change.
December 1, 2020	CNXC	Concentrix			S&P MidCap 400 constituent SYNNEX Corp. spun off Concentrix.
November 13, 2020	MTG	MGIC Investment Corporation	GEO	GEO Group	Market capitalization change.
November 13, 2020	HALO	Halozyme	MD	Mednax	Market capitalization change.
October 7, 2020	NEOG	Neogen	POOL	Pool Corporation	Market capitalization change.
October 7, 2020	SSD	Simpson Manufacturing	DLPH	Delphi Technologies	S&P 500 constituent BorgWarner acquired Delphi Technologies.
October 5, 2020	SAIL	SailPoint Technologies	SBH	Sally Beauty Holdings	Market capitalization change.
September 21, 2020	HRB	H&R Block	ETSY	Etsy	Market capitalization change.
September 21, 2020	COTY	Coty	TER	Teradyne	Market capitalization change.
September 21, 2020	KSS	Kohl's	CTLT	Catalent	Market capitalization change.
September 21, 2020	JAZZ	Jazz Pharmaceuticals	RIG	Transocean	Market capitalization change.
September 21, 2020	WING	Wingstop	PBF	PBF Energy	Market capitalization change.
September 21, 2020	MEDP	Medpace	ATI	Allegheny Technologies	Market capitalization change.
September 21, 2020	FOXF	Fox Factory	CLI	Mack-Cali Realty	Market capitalization change.
September 1, 2020	LAD	Lithia Motors	LOGM	LogMeIn	Francisco Partners and Elliott Management acquired LogMeIn.
August 17, 2020	BLDR	Builders FirstSource	CXW	CoreCivic	Market capitalization change.
August 3, 2020	RUN	Sunrun	LM	Legg Mason	S&P 500 constituent Franklin Resources acquired Legg Mason.
August 3, 2020	IAA	IAA, Inc.	DLX	Deluxe Corporation	Market capitalization change.
August 3, 2020	REXR	Rexford Industrial Realty	CRS	Carpenter Technology	Market capitalization change.
July 24, 2020	EBS	Emergent BioSolutions	CZR	Caesars Entertainment	S&P MidCap 400 constituent Eldorado Resorts (NASD:ERI) acquired Caesars Entertainment.
June 30, 2020	BLD	TopBuild Corp.	TECD	Tech Data	Apollo Global Management acquired Tech Data.
June 25, 2020	GO	Grocery Outlet	EAT	Brinker International	Market capitalization change.
June 22, 2020	ADS	Alliance Data Systems	TDY	Teledyne Technologies	Market capitalization changes
June 22, 2020	JWN	Nordstrom	BIO	Bio-Rad Laboratories	Market capitalization changes
June 22, 2020	HOG	Harley-Davidson	TYL	Tyler Technologies	Market capitalization changes
June 22, 2020	MIDD	Middleby Corporation	DDS	Dillard's	Market capitalization changes
June 22, 2020	QDEL	Quidel Corp	DNOW	DNOW Inc.	Market capitalization changes
June 22, 2020	HXL	Hexcel	CAKE	Cheesecake Factory	Market capitalization changes
June 22, 2020	UNVR	Univar Solutions	REZI	Resideo Technologies	Market capitalization changes
June 22, 2020	STRA	Strategic Education	BBBY	Bed Bath & Beyond	Market capitalization changes
June 22, 2020	QLYS	Qualys Inc	MTDR	Matador Resources	Market capitalization changes
June 22, 2020	GBCI	Glacier Bancorp	MDRX	Allscripts Healthcare Solutions	Market capitalization changes
May 27, 2020	HPP	Hudson Pacific Properties	DHC	Diversified Healthcare Trust	Hudson Pacific Properties Inc. (NYSE:HPP) replaced Diversified Healthcare Trust (NASD:DHC).
May 26, 2020	ESNT	Essent Group Ltd	PTEN	Patterson-UTI Energy	Essent Group Ltd. (NYSE:ESNT) replaced Patterson-UTI Energy Inc. (NASD:PTEN).
May 18, 2020	DOC	Physicians Realty Trust	WST	West Pharmaceutical Services	Physicians Realty Trust replaced West Pharmaceutical Services.
May 6, 2020	STOR	Store Capital	DPZ	Domino's Pizza	STORE Capital Corp. (NYSE:STOR) replaced Domino's Pizza.
April 27, 2020	ENPH	Enphase Energy	CLB	Core Laboratories	S&P 400 to S&P 600 moves
April 27, 2020	PCTY	Paylocity Holding	MDP	Meredith Corp	S&P 400 to S&P 600 moves
April 13, 2020	LHCG	LHC Group	CY	Cypress Semiconductor	S&P SmallCap 600 constituent LHC Group Inc. (NASD: LHCG) replaced Cypress Semiconductor Corp. (NASD: CY).
February 27, 2020	XEC	Cimarex Energy	CHK	Chesapeake Energy	Market capitalization change.
February 7, 2020	GNRC	Generac Holdings	ALEX	Alexander & Baldwin	Generac Holdings Inc. (NYSE:GNRC) replaced Alexander & Baldwin Inc. (NYSE:ALEX).
January 31, 2020	TMHC	Taylor Morrison	GDOT	Green Dot Corp	Taylor Morrison Home Corp. (NYSE: TMHC) replaced Green Dot Corp. (NYSE: GDOT).
January 29, 2020	DAR	Darling Ingredients	LPT	Liberty Property Trust	S&P SmallCap 600 constituent Darling Ingredients Inc. (NYSE: DAR) replaced Liberty Property Trust (NYSE: LPT).
January 21, 2020	CIT	CIT Group	SKT	Tanger Factory Outlet Centers	CIT Group Inc. (NYSE:CIT) replaced Tanger Factory Outlet Centers, Inc. (NYSE:SKT).
December 26, 2019	RH	RH	GWR	Genesee & Wyoming	S&P SmallCap 600 constituent RH (NYSE: RH) replaced Genesee & Wyoming Inc. (NYSE: GWR).
December 17, 2019	COLM	Columbia Sportswear	UNIT	Uniti Group	Columbia Sportswear Company (NASD: COLM) replaced Uniti Group Inc. (NASD: UNIT).
December 13, 2019	AMG	Affiliated Managers Group	LYV	Live Nation Entertainment	Market capitalization changes.
December 13, 2019	TRIP	TripAdvisor	ZBRA	Zebra Technologies	Market capitalization changes.
December 13, 2019	MAC	Macerich Co.	STE	STERIS plc	Market capitalization changes.
December 13, 2019	LOPE	Grand Canyon Education	OAS	Oasis Petroleum	Market capitalization changes.
December 13, 2019	LEA	Lear Corp	SWN	Southwestern Energy	Market capitalization changes.
December 13, 2019	ARWR	Arrowhead Pharmaceuticals	GVA	Granite Construction	Market capitalization changes.
December 10, 2019	CHH	Choice Hotels	PLT	Plantronics	Choice Hotels International Inc. (NYSE: CHH) replaced Plantronics Inc. (NYSE: PLT).
December 2, 2019	CCMP	Cabot Microelectronics	ODFL	Old Dominion Freight Line	S&P SmallCap 600 constituent Cabot Microelectronics Corp. (NASD: CCMP) replaced Old Dominion Freight Line.
November 27, 2019	RLI	RLI Corp.	WRB	W.R. Berkley	S&P SmallCap 600 constituent RLI Corp. (NYSE:RLI) replaced W.R. Berkley.
October 30, 2019	CDAY	Ceridian	OII	Oceaneering International	Market capitalization changes.
October 30, 2019	BJ	BJ's Wholesale Club	CVET	Covetrus	Market capitalization changes.
October 24, 2019	FCN	FTI Consulting	MDSO	Medidata Solutions	Dassault Systèmes SA is acquiring Medidata Solutions in a transaction expected to be completed on or about that date pending final conditions.
October 18, 2019	SEDG	SolarEdge	ISCA	International Speedway	NASCAR Holdings Inc. acquired International Speedway.
October 8, 2019	MRCY	Mercury Systems	VSM	Versum Materials	Merck KGaAis acquiring Versum Materialsin a deal expected to be completed on or about that date pending final conditions.
October 3, 2019	NKTR	Nektar Therapeutics	BID	Sotheby's	Market capitalization change.
September 26, 2019	JEF	Jefferies Financial Group	NVR	NVR	Market capitalization changes.
September 26, 2019	IIVI	II-VI	CPE	Callon Petroleum	Market capitalization changes.
September 18, 2019	PK	Park Hotels & Resorts	INGN	Inogen	Market capitalization changes.
September 23, 2019	SIGI	Selective Insurance Group Inc.	SIG	Signet Jewelers Ltd	Market capitalization changes
September 23, 2019	RGEN	Repligen	RRC	Range Resources Corp	Market capitalization changes
September 23, 2019	FCFS	FirstCash	TUP	Tupperware Brands Corp	Market capitalization changes
September 23, 2019	ETSY	Etsy	MIK	The Michaels Companies	Market capitalization changes
September 23, 2019	PPC	Pilgrim's Pride	QEP	QEP Resources	Market capitalization changes
September 23, 2019	KAR	KAR Auction Services	VAL	Valaris Limited	Market capitalization changes
September 23, 2019	AM	Antero Midstream	MDR	McDermott International	Market capitalization changes
September 23, 2019	OC	Owens Corning	CARS	Cars.com	Market capitalization changes
September 23, 2019	PEN	Penumbra, Inc.	MNK	Mallinckrodt	Market capitalization changes
August 9, 2019	GRUB	Grubhub	LDOS	Leidos Holdings	Market capitalization
August 9, 2019	FL	Foot Locker	IEX	IDEX Corp.	Market capitalization
August 1, 2019	TTEK	Tetra Tech	CHFC	Chemical Financial	Chemical Financial Corp. (NASD: CHFC) acquired TCF Financial Corporation and was renamed TCF Financial Corporation
July 9, 2019	SRC	Spirit Realty	SM	SM Energy	Market capitalization
July 1, 2019	AAXN	Axon Enterprise	MKTX	MarketAxess	MarketAxess Holdings Inc. (NASD:MKTX) will replace L3 Technologies Inc. (NYSE:LLL) in the S&P 500.
June 7, 2019	MAT	Mattel	BMS	Bemis Company	Amcor Limited (ASX: AMC) is merging with Bemis.
June 4, 2019	FLR	Fluor	RLGY	Realogy	Fluor has a market capitalization more representative of the mid-cap market space.
May 7, 2019	EGP	EastGroup Properties	ULTI	Ultimate Software Group	Hellman & Friedman acquired Ultimate Software Group.
April 11, 2019	SMTC	Semtech	ARRS	Arris International	CommScope Holding Company Inc.(NASD:COMM) acquired ARRIS International.
April 11, 2019	PSB	PS Business Parks	RDC	Rowan Companies	S&P MidCap 400 constituent Ensco plc (NYSE:ESV) is acquiring Rowan Companies.
April 3, 2019	BHF	Brighthouse Financial	PBI	Pitney Bowes	Pitney Bowes will replace Carbo Ceramics Inc. (NYSE:CRR) in the S&P SmallCap 600.
April 1, 2019	TREX	Trex Company, Inc.	IDTI	Integrated Device Technology	Renesas Electronics Corp. acquired Integrated Device Technology.
March 22, 2019	FFIN	First Financial	MBFI	MB Financial	Fifth Third Bancorp (NASD: FITB) is acquiring MB Financial.
March 18, 2019	CFX	Colfax	BIG	Big Lots	Colfax Corp. (NYSE:CFX) will replace and Big Lots Inc. (NYSE:BIG) in the S&P MidCap 400.
March 18, 2019	NGVT	Ingevity	ESL	Esterline Technologies	TransDigm Group Inc. (NYSE:TDG) is acquiring Esterline Technologies.
March 18, 2019	XPO	XPO, Inc.	DO	Diamond Offshore Drilling	Diamond Offshore Drilling will replace Maiden Holding Ltd. (NASD:MHLD) in the S&P SmallCap 600.
February 27, 2019	GT	Goodyear Tire & Rubber	WAB	Wabtec	The Goodyear Tire & Rubber will replace Wabtec in the S&P MidCap 400.
February 21, 2019	AMED	Amedisys	AHL	Aspen Insurance Holdings	Apollo Global Management (NYSE: APO) is acquiring Aspen Insurance Holdings.
February 11, 2019	CVET	Covetrus	DNB	Dun & Bradstreet Corp	Cannae Holdings Inc. (CNNE) is acquiring Dun & Bradstreet.
February 6, 2019	BRX	Brixmor Property Group	VVC	Vectren	CenterPoint Energy Inc. (NYSE:CNP)is acquiring Vectren.
February 4, 2019	CZR	Caesars Entertainment	DRQ	Dril-Quip	Dril-Quip will replace Essendant Inc. (NASD:ESND) in the S&P SmallCap 600.
January 18, 2019	GDOT	Green Dot	TFX	Teleflex	TeleflexInc.(NYSE:TFX) will replace PG&E Corp.(NYSE:PCG) in the S&P 500.
December 12, 2018	YELP	Yelp	GPOR	Gulfport Energy Corp	Gulfport Energy Corp.(NASD:GPOR) will replace OclaroInc. (NASD: OCLR) in the S&P SmallCap 600.
December 10, 2018	OLED	Universal Display	NBR	Nabors Industries	Nabors Industries Ltd. (NYSE: NBR) will replace Sonic Corp. (NASD: SONC) in the S&P SmallCap 600.
December 3, 2018	PEB	Pebblebrook Hotel Trust	LHO	LaSalle Hotel Properties	Pebblebrook Hotel Trust is acquiring LaSalle Hotel Properties.
December 3, 2018	SRCL	Stericycle	EGN	Energen	Stericycle replaced Energen Corp. (NYSE:EGN) in the S&P MidCap 400.
December 3, 2018	CACI	CACI International	LW	Lamb Weston Holdings	CACI International Inc. replaced Lamb Weston Holdings in the S&P MidCap 400.
November 14, 2018			SPN	Superior Energy Services	Superior Energy Services Inc. (NYSE: SPN) was removed from the S&P MidCap 400 and added to the S&P SmallCap 600.
November 13, 2018	LGND	Ligand Pharmaceuticals	KEYS	Keysight Technologies	Keysight replaced CA Inc. in the S&P 500.
November 13, 2018	EQT	EQT Corporation	JKHY	Jack Henry & Associates	EQT replaced Jack Henry & Associates in the S&P MidCap 400.
November 13, 2018	ETRN	Equitrans Midstream			Equitrans Midstream Corp. was added to the S&P MidCap 400.
November 12, 2018	MTZ	MasTec	UNFI	United Natural Foods	United Natural Foods will replace MiMedx Group Inc. (NASD: MDXG) in the S&P SmallCap 600.
November 6, 2018	NSP	Insperity	LPNT	LifePoint Health Inc.	Insperity will replace LifePointHealth Inc.
October 11, 2018	ASGN	ASGN Inc.	FTNT	Fortinet	Fortinet replaced Envision Healthcare Corp. in the S&P 500.
October 10, 2018	PENN	Penn National Gaming	CVG	Convergys	S&P MidCap 400 constituent SYNNEX Corporation acquired Convergys.
September 20, 2018	RLGY	Realogy	EDR	Education Realty Trust	Greystar Real Estate Partners acquired Education Realty Trust.
September 18, 2018	WTW	Weight Watchers	KLXI	KLX Inc.	S&P 500 constituent Boeing acquired KLX.
September 17, 2018	HQY	HealthEquity	WCG	WellCare	WellCare Health Plans, Inc. replaced XL Group (NYSE: XL) in the S&P 500.
September 4, 2018	VAC	Marriott Vacations Worldwide	ILG	ILG, Inc.	Marriott Vacations Worldwide acquired ILG.
August 22, 2018	ADNT	Adient	DCT	DCT Industrial Trust	S&P 500 constituent ProLogis Inc. acquired DCT Industrial Trust.
August 20, 2018	ERI	Eldorado Resorts	PAY	VeriFone	Francisco Partners acquired VeriFone Systems.
August 1, 2018	WWE	World Wrestling Entertainment	QCP	Quality Care Properties	S&P 500 constituent Welltower Inc. (NYSE:WELL) acquired Quality Care Properties.
July 11, 2018	VC	Visteon	WGL	WGL Holdings	AltaGas Ltd. (TSX:ALA) acquired WGL Holdings.
July 2, 2018	EXEL	Exelixis	CPRT	Copart	Copart replaced Dr Pepper Snapple Group Inc. (NYSE: DPS) in the S&P 500.
June 18, 2018	AYI	Acuity Brands	HFC	HollyFrontier	Market capitalization changes
June 18, 2018	RRC	Range Resources	BR	Broadridge Financial Solutions	Market capitalization changes
June 18, 2018	CHE	Chemed Corp.	ENDP	Endo International	Market capitalization changes
June 18, 2018	HAE	Haemonetics	CTB	Cooper Tire & Rubber Co.	Market capitalization changes
June 11, 2018	OLLI	Ollie's Bargain Outlet	OA	Orbital ATK	S&P 500 constituent Northrop Grumman Corp. (NYSE: NOC) acquired Orbital ATK.
June 5, 2018	NAVI	Navient Corp.	WR	Westar Energy (renamed Evergy)	Navient had a market capitalization closer to the mid-cap market space.
June 5, 2018	IART	Integra LifeSciences	GXP	Great Plains Energy	Westar Energy acquired Great Plains Energy which moved the combined company to the S&P 500.
May 31, 2018	WYND	Wyndham Destinations	MSCC	Microsemi	S&P 500 constituent Microchip Technology Inc. (NASD:MCHP) acquired Microsemi.
May 31, 2018	PRAH	PRA Health Sciences	ABMD	Abiomed	ABIOMED Inc. replaced Wyndham Worldwide Corp. (NYSE:WYN) in the S&P 500.
May 10, 2018	APY	Apergy Corp.	DDD	3D Systems	S&P 500 constituent Dover Corp. (NYSE: DOV) spun off Apergy.
May 10, 2018	MDR	McDermott International	DBD	Diebold Nixdorf	McDermott International merged with Chicago Bridge & Iron Company N.V. (NYSE: CBI).
May 2, 2018	NVT	nVent Electric	KN	Knowles Corporation	S&P 500 constituent Pentair plc (NYSE: PNR) spun off nVent Electric.
May 1, 2018	OAS	Oasis Petroleum	WPG	Washington Prime Group	Market capitalization changes
April 19, 2018	FIVE	Five Below	DST	DST Systems	SS&C Technologies Holdings Inc. (NASD: SSNC) acquired DST Systems.
April 4, 2018	LITE	Lumentum	MSCI	MSCI Inc	MSCI Inc. replaced CSRA Inc. (NYSE: CSRA) in the S&P 500.
March 26, 2018	EVR	Evercore	LNCE	Snyder's-Lance	S&P 500 constituent Campbell's (NYSE:CPB) acquired Snyder's-Lance.
March 19, 2018	SIG	Signet Jewelers	TTWO	Take-Two Interactive	Market capitalization changes
March 19, 2018	PDCO	Patterson Companies	SIVB	SVB Financial	Market capitalization changes
March 19, 2018	CHK	Chesapeake Energy	DF	Dean Foods	Market capitalization changes
March 19, 2018	CMD	Cantel Medical	AVP	Avon Products	Market capitalization changes
March 19, 2018	ICUI	ICU Medical	OMI	Owens & Minor	Market capitalization changes
March 8, 2018	TREE	LendingTree	BIVV	Bioverativ	Sanofi acquired Bioverativ.
March 7, 2018	ALE	ALLETE Inc.	IPGP	IPG Photonics	IPG Photonics Corp. replaced Scripps Networks Interactive Inc. (NASD: SNI) in the S&P 500.
February 13, 2018	BYD	Boyd Gaming	CAA	CalAtlantic Homes	S&P 500 constituent Lennar acquired CalAtlantic.
February 5, 2018	HCSG	Healthcare Services Group	BWLD	Buffalo Wild Wings	Arby's Restaurant Group acquired Buffalo Wild Wings.
January 3, 2018	SGMS	Scientific Games	HII	Huntington Ingalls	Huntington Ingalls Industries Inc. replaced C. R. Bard Inc. (NYSE:BCR) in the S&P 500.
January 2, 2018	EHC	Encompass Health Corp.	HLS	HealthSouth	S&P 400 constituent HealthSouth (NYSE: HLS) renamed Encompass Health and changed to new symbol.
January 2, 2018	IBKR	Interactive Brokers	HSNI	HSN Inc	S&P 600 constituent Interactive Brokers Group Inc. replaced Home Shopping Network Inc. (HSN) after Liberty Interactive Corp acquired HSN.
December 6, 2017	DLPH	Delphi Technologies	FTR	Frontier Communications	S&P 500 constituent Delphi Automotive plc (NYSE: DLPH), to be renamed Aptiv plc and trade under new symbol APTV, spun off Delphi Technologies.
November 22, 2017	MKSI	MKS Instruments	BRCD	Brocade Communications	S&P 500 constituent Broadcom Limited acquired Brocade Communications Systems.
October 2, 2017	SIX	Six Flags	PRXL	PAREXEL	Pamplona Capital Management acquired PAREXEL.
October 2, 2017	STL	Sterling Bancorp	OIS	Oil States International	Sterling Bancorp acquired Astoria Financial.
September 26, 2017	SAFM	Sanderson Farms	CAB	Cabela's	Bass Pro Shops acquired Cabela's.
September 18, 2017	ILG	ILG, Inc.	CDNS	Cadence Design Systems	Cadence Design Systems replaced Staples Inc. in the S&P 500.
September 18, 2017	BCO	Brink's	WOOF	VCA Inc.	Mars Inc. acquired VCA.
September 18, 2017	CPE	Callon Petroleum	WBMD	WebMD	Internet Brands acquired WebMD Health.
August 17, 2017	SBRA	Sabra Health Care REIT	CCP	Care Capital Properties	Sabra Health Care REIT acquired Care Capital Properties.
August 10, 2017	COR	CoreSite Realty	NSR	Neustar	NeuStar was acquired by a private investment group led by Golden Gate Capital.
August 8, 2017	AN	AutoNation	FCN	FTI Consulting	Brighthouse Financial Inc. (NASD: BHF) replaced AutoNation in the S&P 500.
July 26, 2017	MNK	Mallinckrodt	RMD	ResMed	Market capitalization changes
July 26, 2017	MUR	Murphy Oil	PKG	Packaging Corporation of America	Market capitalization changes
July 26, 2017	BBBY	Bed Bath & Beyond	AOS	A.O. Smith	Market capitalization changes
July 26, 2017	RIG	Transocean	DRE	Duke Realty	Market capitalization changes
July 19, 2017	JBGS	JBG Smith	CHS	Chico's FAS	S&P 500 constituent Vornado Realty Trust (NYSE:VNO) spun off JBG SMITH Properties.
July 12, 2017	KNX	Knight Transportation	KATE	Kate Spade & Company	S&P 500 constituent Coach, Inc. (NYSE:COH) acquired Kate Spade.
July 12, 2017	CLB	Core Laboratories	PNRA	Panera Bread	JAB Holdings B.V. acquired Panera Bread.
June 29, 2017	BLKB	Blackbaud	CST	CST Brands	Alimentation Couche-Tard acquired CST Brands.
June 26, 2017	MDSO	Medidata Solutions	PVTB	PrivateBancorp	Canadian Imperial Bank of Commerce acquired PrivateBancorp.
June 19, 2017	PNFP	Pinnacle Financial Partners	RE	Everest Re	Everest Re Group Ltd replaced Mead Johnson Nutrition Co. in the S&P 500.
June 19, 2017	TDC	Teradata	ALGN	Align Technology	Market capitalization changes
June 19, 2017	R	Ryder System	ANSS	ANSYS Inc	Market capitalization changes
June 2, 2017	CARS	Cars.com	TIME	Time Inc.	TEGNA spun off Cars.com.
June 2, 2017	TGNA	Tegna, Inc.	JCP	J. C. Penney	IHS Markit Ltd. (NASD:INFO) replaced TEGNA Inc. in the S&P 500.
June 2, 2017	MTDR	Matador Resources	WNR	Western Refining	S&P 500 constituent Tesoro Corp. (NYSE:TSO) acquired Western Refining.
June 2, 2017	HOMB	Home BancShares	VAL	Valspar	S&P 500 constituent The Sherwin-Williams Co. (NYSE:SHW) acquired Valspar.
May 16, 2017	VVV	Valvoline Inc	NE	Noble Corporation	S&P MidCap 400 constituent Ashland Global Holdings Inc. (NYSE:ASH) spun off its remaining stake in Valvoline.
April 28, 2017	PBF	PBF Energy	WDR	Waddell & Reed	Waddell & Reed Financial replaced Stillwater Mining Co. (NYSE: SWC) in the S&P SmallCap 600.
April 19, 2017	SABR	Sabre Corp	BEAV	B/E Aerospace	S&P 500 constituent Rockwell Collins Inc. (NYSE:COL) acquired B/E Aerospace.
April 12, 2017	UBSI	United Bankshares	WWAV	WhiteWave Foods	Danone SA acquired WhiteWave Foods.
April 6, 2017	ACHC	Acadia Healthcare	JOY	Joy Global	Komatsu Limited acquired Joy Global.
April 5, 2017	DNB	Dun & Bradstreet	IT	Gartner	Gartner Inc. replaced The Dun & Bradstreet Corp. in the S&P 500.
April 5, 2017	INCR	INC Research	CEB	CEB Inc.	Gartner acquired CEB.
April 4, 2017	SWN	Southwestern Energy	CSC	Computer Sciences Corp.	Computer Sciences Corp. replaced Southwestern Energy Co. in the S&P 500.
April 3, 2017	WTFC	Wintrust Financial	MENT	Mentor Graphics	Siemens Industry Inc. acquired Mentor Graphics.
March 29, 2017	TCBI	Texas Capital Bancshares	ENH	Endurance Specialty Holdings	SOMPO Holdings Inc. acquired Endurance Specialty Holdings.
March 29, 2017	MIK	The Michaels Companies	WETF	WisdomTree Investments	WisdomTree Investments moved to the S&P SmallCap 600.
March 20, 2017	URBN	Urban Outfitters	AMD	Advanced Micro Devices	Market capitalization changes
March 20, 2017	FTR	Frontier Communications	RJF	Raymond James Financial	Market capitalization changes
March 20, 2017	FSLR	First Solar	ARE	Alexandria Real Estate Equities	Market capitalization changes
March 20, 2017	TTWO	Take-Two Interactive	FOSL	Fossil Group	Market capitalization changes
March 20, 2017	MASI	Masimo	DNR	Denbury Resources	Market capitalization changes
March 20, 2017	COHR	Coherent, Inc.	VSTO	Vista Outdoor	Market capitalization changes
March 16, 2017	GEO	GEO Group	SNPS	Synopsys	Synopsys Inc. replaced Harman International Industries Inc. (NYSE:HAR) in the S&P 500.
March 2, 2017	ENDP	Endo International	REG	Regency Centers	Regency Centers acquired Equity One. S&P MidCap 400 constituent Regency Centers Corp. (NYSE:REG) replaced Endo International plc (NASD:ENDP) in the S&P 500.
March 2, 2017	NUS	Nu Skin	EQY	Equity One	Equity One acquired by Regency Centers.
March 1, 2017	PBI	Pitney Bowes	CBOE	CBOE Holdings	CBOE acquired Bats Global Markets Inc. (BATS:BATS). Post acquisition, CBOE Holdings Inc. (NASD:CBOE) will replace Pitney Bowes Inc. (NYSE:PBI) in the S&P 500.
March 1, 2017	CONE	CyrusOne	CLC	CLARCOR Inc.	S&P 500 constituent Parker-Hannifin Corp. (NYSE:PH) acquired CLARCOR.
February 28, 2017	DDS	Dillard's	ISIL	Intersil	Renesas Electronics acquired Intersil.
February 13, 2017	CTB	Cooper Tire & Rubber	SCOR	comScore	NASDAQ announced that comScore will be delisted from its exchange due to non-compliance.
February 3, 2017	BIVV	Bioverativ	RH	Restoration Hardware	S&P 100 & 500 constituent Biogen Inc. (NASD: BIIB) spun off Bioverativ. RH replaced Ciber Inc. (NYSE:CBR) in the S&P SmallCap 600.
February 2, 2017	LOGM	LogMeIn	TGI	Triumph Group	S&P 500 constituent Citrix Systems (NASD: CTXS) spun-off GetGo Inc., which was immediately acquired by LogMeIn.
January 4, 2017	CC	Chemours	IDXX	IDEXX Laboratories	S&P 100 & 500 constituent Abbott Laboratories (NYSE:ABT) acquired St. Jude Medical. S&P MidCap 400 constituent IDEXX Laboratories, Inc. (NASD:IDXX) replaced St. Jude Medical, Inc. (NYSE:STJ) in the S&P 500.
December 6, 2016	UMBF	UMB Financial	IM	Ingram Micro	Tianjin Tianhai Investment Company Ltd acquired Ingram Micro.
December 6, 2016	GMED	Globus Medical	TLN	Talen Energy	Riverstone Holdings LLC acquired Talen Energy.
December 1, 2016	OI	Owens-Illinois	MAA	Mid-America Apartments	OI replaces MAA. Owens-Illinois is ranked near the bottom of the S&P 500 and has a market capitalization more representative of the mid-cap market space.
December 1, 2016	PZZA	Papa John's Intl	PPS	Post Properties	S&P SmallCap 600 constituent Papa John's International Inc. (NASD: PZZA) will replace Post Properties Inc. (NYSE: PPS) in the S&P MidCap 400, and Wingstop Inc. (NASD: WING) will replace Papa John's International in the S&P SmallCap 600. Mid-America Apartment Communities is acquiring Post Properties
December 1, 2016	LM	Legg Mason	AMSG	AmSurg Corp	AmSurg Corp. (NASD: AMSG) will replace Legg Mason Inc. (NYSE: LM) in the S&P 500, and Legg Mason will replace AmSurg in the S&P MidCap 400. AmSurg is acquiring Envision Healthcare Holdings Inc. (NYSE: EVHC). Post merger, AmSurg will change its name to Envision Healthcare Corporation. Legg Mason is ranked near the bottom of the S&P 500 and has a market capitalization more representative of the mid-cap market space.
November 28, 2016	LFUS	Littelfuse	LXK	Lexmark International	Apex Technology and PAG Asia Capital acquired Lexmark International.
November 10, 2016	LW	Lamb Weston Holdings	ASNA	Ascena Retail Group	S&P 500 constituent ConAgra Foods Inc. (NYSE: CAG) spun off Lamb Weston Holdings.
November 3, 2016	HLS	HealthSouth	RAX	Rackspace	Apollo Global Management LLC acquired Rackspace Hosting.
November 1, 2016	QCP	Quality Care Properties	GES	Guess? Inc	S&P 500 constituent HCP Inc. (NYSE: HCP) is spinning off Quality Care Properties.
October 5, 2016	CUZ	Cousins Properties	CYH	Community Health Systems	Cousins Properties is acquiring Parkway Properties. Community Health Systems is ranked near the bottom of the S&P MidCap 400.
October 3, 2016	VSM	Versum Materials	ANF	Abercrombie & Fitch	S&P 500 constituent Air Products and Chemicals Inc. (NYSE: APD) is spinning off Versum Materials. Air Products and Chemicals will remain in the S&P 500 post spin-off.
September 30, 2016	DO	Diamond Offshore Drilling	PLCM	Polycom	Siris Capital Group acquired Polycom. Coty, Inc. replaces Diamond Offshore in the S&P 500 index.
September 27, 2016	SBH	Sally Beauty	RRD	RR Donnelley	R.R. Donnelly & Sons is spinning off certain operations and assets. Post spin-offs, the R.R. Donnelly & Sons stub will be more representative of the small-cap market space.
September 22, 2016	NWE	NorthWestern	COO	The Cooper Companies	The Cooper Companies Inc. (NYSE: COO) replaces Starwood Hotels & Resorts Worldwide Inc. (NYSE: HOT) in the S&P 500. S&P 500 constituent Marriott International Inc. (NASD: MAR) acquires Starwood.
September 22, 2016	NUVA	NuVasive	FEIC	FEI Company	S&P 500 constituent Thermo Fisher Scientific Inc. (NYSE: TMO) acquired FEI.
September 21, 2016	CRUS	Cirrus Logic	FCS	Fairchild Semiconductor	ON Semiconductor (NASD: ON) acquired Fairchild Semiconductor.
September 16, 2016	CAR	Avis Budget Group	STR	Questar	S&P 500 constituent Dominion Resources, Inc. (NYSE: D) is acquiring Questar in a deal expected to be completed soon pending final approvals.
September 2, 2016	MPWR	Monolithic Power Systems	MTD	Mettler-Toledo	S&P MidCap 400 constituent Mettler-Toledo International Inc. (NYSE: MTD) replaced Johnson Controls Inc. (NYSE: JCI) in the S&P 500. S&P 500 constituent Tyco International plc (NYSE: TYC) acquired Johnson Controls in a merger of equals.
September 1, 2016	CHFC	Chemical Financial (later TCF Financial Corporation)	SVU	SuperValu	Chemical Financial acquired Talmer Bancorp.
August 26, 2016	ENS	EnerSys	DWA	DreamWorks Animation	S&P 500 constituent Comcast Corp (NASD: CMCSA) acquired DreamWorks Animation.
August 19, 2016	DY	Dycom Industries	FMER	FirstMerit	S&P 500 constituent Huntington Bancshares Inc. (NASD:HBAN) acquired FirstMerit.
July 29, 2016	MBFI	MB Financial	FNFG	First Niagara Bank	S&P 500 constituent KeyCorp acquired First Niagara Bank.
June 30, 2016	EME	Emcor	ALB	Albemarle Corporation	Emera Inc. (TSX: EMA) is acquiring TECO Energy in a deal expected to be completed on or about that date pending final conditions.
June 30, 2016	SWX	Southwest Gas	LNT	Alliant Energy	S&P 100 & 500 constituent Southern Co. (NYSE:SO) is acquiring AGL Resources.
June 24, 2016	CHDN	Churchill Downs	FBHS	Fortune Brands Home & Security	S&P MidCap 400 constituent Fortune Brands Home & Security Inc. (NYSE:FBHS) replaced Cablevision Systems Corp. (NYSE:CVC) in the S&P 500 index. Altice NV acquired Cablevision.
May 31, 2016	HELE	Helen of Troy	WCN	Waste Connections	Progressive Waste Solutions Ltd. (TSX:BIN, NYSE: BIN) and Waste Connections are merging to form a new company called Waste Connections. "New" Waste Connections will be considered to be domiciled in Canada for index purposes and will be ineligible for continued inclusion in the S&P MidCap 400.
May 31, 2016	BRCD	Brocade Communications	MDC	MDC Holdings	Brocade Communications Systems is acquiring Ruckus Wireless. MDC has a market capitalization more representative of the small-cap market space.
May 27, 2016	EDR	Education Realty Trust	AJG	Arthur J. Gallagher & Co.	Coca-Cola Enterprises has merged with Coca-Cola Iberian Partners SA and Coca-Cola Erfrischungsgetränke AG to form a new company called Coca-Cola European Partners Plc.
May 23, 2016	MPW	Medical Properties Trust	LKQ	LKQ Corp	S&P MidCap 400 constituent LKQ Corp. (NASD:LKQ) will replace Airgas Inc. (NYSE:ARG) in the S&P 500. Air Liquide SA acquired Airgas.
May 12, 2016	TXRH	Texas Roadhouse	ALK	Alaska Air Group	S&P 500 constituent Western Digital Corp. (NASD:WDC) is acquiring SanDisk Corp. in a deal expected to be completed on or about that date pending final conditions.
May 3, 2016	VSAT	ViaSat	AYI	Acuity Brands	S&P MidCap 400 constituent Acuity Brands, Inc. (NYSE: AYI) will replace The ADT Corp. (NYSE: ADT) in the S&P 500. Apollo Global Management, LLC acquired The ADT Corp.
April 22, 2016	GME	GameStop	GPN	Global Payments Inc	Global Payments is acquiring Heartland Payment Systems. Post-merger, Global Payment's market capitalization will be more representative of the large cap market space. GameStop is ranked near the bottom of the S&P 500 and has a market capitalization that is more representative of the mid-cap market space.
April 18, 2016	THC	Tenet Healthcare	JAH	Jarden	S&P 500 constituent Newell Rubbermaid Inc. (NYSE:NWL) acquired Jarden. Ulta Salon, Cosmetics & Fragrance Inc. (NASD:ULTA) replaced Tenet Healthcare Corp. (NYSE:THC) in the S&P 500.
April 14, 2016	PBH	Prestige Brands	CNL	CLECO	Macquarie Infrastructure Partners acquired Cleco.
April 6, 2016	RH	Restoration Hardware	ATML	Atmel	S&P 500 constituent Microchip Technology Inc. (NASD: MCHP) acquired Atmel.
April 4, 2016	WBMD	webMD Health	SUNE	SunEdison	SunEdison has a market capitalization that is no longer representative of the mid-cap market space.
April 4, 2016	DCT	DCT Industrial Trust	FL	Foot Locker	S&P MidCap 400 constituent Foot Locker Inc. (NYSE:FL) replaced Cameron International Corp. (NYSE:CAM) in the S&P 500. S&P 100 & 500 constituent Schlumberger Ltd (NYSE:SLB) acquired Cameron International.
March 30, 2016	ABMD	Abiomed	HOLX	Hologic	Exelon acquired Pepco Holdings. Hologic moved to S&P 500 to replace Pepco Holdings.
March 30, 2016	ESV	Ensco plc	CNC	Centene	S&P MidCap 400 constituent Centene Corp. (NYSE: CNC) replaced Ensco plc (NYSE: ESV) in the S&P 500.
March 30, 2016	FR	First Industrial Realty Trust	HNT	Health Net	Centene acquired Health Net.
March 8, 2016	NJR	New Jersey Resources	SFG	StanCorp Financial	Meiji Yasuda Life Insurance Co. acquired StanCorp Financial.
March 7, 2016	HR	Healthcare Realty Trust	UDR	UDR, Inc.	S&P MidCap 400 constituent UDR Inc. (NYSE: UDR) replaced Keurig Green Mountain Inc. (NASD:GMCR) in the S&P 500. JAB Holding Company acquired Keurig Green Mountain.
March 4, 2016	CNX	Consol Energy	SLH	Solera Holdings	Vista Equity Partners acquired Solera.
March 1, 2016	PVTB	PrivateBancorp	SIRO	Sirona Dental Systems	S&P 500 constituent Dentsply International Inc. (NASD:XRAY) acquired Sirona Dental Systems.
February 25, 2016	LNCE	Snyder's-Lance	CRC	California Resources	Snyder's-Lance acquired Diamond Foods. California Resources had a low stock price, and its low market capitalization ranked it at the bottom of the S&P MidCap 400.
February 9, 2016	FNB	FNB Corporation	RCII	Rent-A-Center	F.N.B. acquired Metro Bancorp.
February 9, 2016	SFM	Sprouts Farmers Market	SWI	SolarWinds	Private equity firms Silver Lake Partners and Thoma Bravo LLC acquired SolarWinds.
February 1, 2016	SCOR	comScore	CC	Chemours	comScore acquired Rentrak Corp. (NASD:RENT). The combined company's market capitalization will be more representative of the mid-cap market space.
February 1, 2016	CW	Curtiss-Wright	FRT	Federal Realty Investment Trust	S&P 500 constituent Avago Technologies Ltd. (NASD:AVGO) acquired Broadcom. S&P MidCap 400 constituent Federal Realty Investment Trust (NYSE:FRT) replaced Broadcom Corp. (NASD:BRCM) in the S&P 500.
January 27, 2016	POOL	Pool Corporation	BMR	BioMed Realty Trust	Private equity firm Blackstone Real Estate Partners acquired BioMed Realty Trust.
January 19, 2016	MSCC	Microsemi	ATW	Atwood Oceanics	Microsemi acquired PMC-Sierra Inc. (NASD: PMCS) and the combined company's market capitalization was more representative of the mid-cap market space. Atwood Oceanics was ranked at the bottom of the S&P MidCap 400 and had a market capitalization more representative of the small-cap market space.
January 19, 2016	EPR	EPR Properties	EXR	Extra Space Storage	S&P 500 constituent ACE Ltd. (NYSE:ACE) acquired Chubb. S&P MidCap 400 constituent Extra Space Storage Inc. (NYSE:EXR) replaced The Chubb Corp. (NYSE:CB) in the S&P 500.
January 5, 2016	FOSL	Fossil Group	TW	Towers Watson	Willis Group merged with Towers Watson. The combined company replaces Fossil Group in the S&P 500.
December 29, 2015	SNX	Synnex	CHD	Church & Dwight	S&P 100 & 500 constituent Intel Corp. (NASD:INTC) acquired Altera. S&P MidCap 400 constituent Church & Dwight Co. (NYSE:CHD) replaced Altera Corp. (NASD:ALTR) in the S&P 500.
December 14, 2015	JCOM	j2 Global	CYT	Cytec Industries	Solvay S.A. acquired Cytec Industries.
November 30, 2015	CSC	Computer Sciences Corp	APOL	Apollo Education	CSRA Inc. will be added to the S&P 500 reflecting its spin-off from Computer Sciences. CSC will be removed from the S&P 500.
November 18, 2015	GNW	Genworth Financial	ROVI	Rovi	Synchrony Financial (NYSE:SYF) replaced Genworth Financial Inc. in the S&P 500.
November 2, 2015	MKTX	MarketAxess Holdings	CYN	City National Corp	Royal Bank of Canada (NYSE:RY) acquired City National.
July 30, 2015	ENH	Endurance Specialty Holdings	TMST	TimkenSteel	Endurance Specialty Holdings acquired Montpelier Re Holdings.
July 8, 2015	JACK	Jack in the Box	AAP	Advance Auto Parts	Dollar Tree has acquired Family Dollar Stores. Advance Auto Parts moves to S&P 500 to replace Family Dollar Stores.
July 8, 2015	WST	West Pharmaceutical Services	ADVS	Advent Software	SS&C Technologies Holdings Inc. (NASD:SSNC) has acquired Advent Software.
July 1, 2015	ATI	Allegheny Technologies	UNT	Unit Corp	S&P 500 constituent NiSource Inc. (NYSE: NI) spun off Columbia Pipeline Group. NiSource will remain in the S&P 500 and Columbia Pipeline will join the S&P 500. Allegheny Technologies and Unit were ranked near or at the bottom of their current indices.
June 30, 2015	CC	Chemours	SMTC	Semtech	S&P 100 & 500 constituent E. I. du Pont de Nemours and Co. (NYSE: DD) spins off Chemours.
June 30, 2015	CABO	Cable One	BTU	Peabody Energy	S&P MidCap 400 constituent Graham Holdings Company (NYSE: GHC) spins off Cable One. Graham Holdings remains in the S&P MidCap 400 following the distribution.
June 30, 2015	EPC	Edgewell Personal Care	HSC	Harsco	S&P MidCap 400 constituent Energizer Inc. (NYSE: ENR) spins off "new" Energizer. Post spin, the parent company will change its name to Edgewell Personal Care Co. and trade under the symbol "EPC". It will remain in the S&P MidCap 400 following the distribution.
June 25, 2015	CASY	Casey's General Stores	AOL	AOL Inc	S&P 100 & 500 constituent Verizon Corp. (NYSE: VZ) acquired AOL.
June 11, 2015	WETF	WisdomTree Investments	QRVO	Qorvo	Qorvo Inc. replaced Lorillard Inc. in the S&P 500 due to Lorillard being acquired by Reynolds American Inc.
June 29, 2015	CBRL	Cracker Barrel	DRC	Dresser-Rand Group	Siemens AG acquired Dresser-Rand Group.
June 10, 2015	MANH	Manhattan Associates Inc.	LTM	Life Time Fitness Inc.	Life Time Fitness is now a private company.
June 1, 2015	TLN	Talen Energy	WIN	Windstream	Talen spun off by PPL Corp (NYSE:PPL); Windstream bumped due to market cap rank
May 29, 2015	OZRK	Bank of the Ozarks	XLS	Exelis	S&P 500 constituent Harris Corp. (NYSE:HRS) acquired Exelis.
April 27, 2015	DNKN	Dunkin' Brands Group Inc	RVBD	Riverbed Technology Inc	Riverbed Technology acquired by group led by Thoma Bravo LLC
April 24, 2015	CSAL	Communications Sales & Leasing	CLF	Cliffs Natural Resources	Communications Sales & Leasing spun off by Windstream Holdings; Cliffs Natural Resources removed due to market cap adjustments
April 7, 2015	CNO	CNO Financial Group	SLXP	Salix Pharmaceuticals	Salix Pharmaceuticals acquired by Valeant Pharmaceuticals (NYSE:VRX).
December 16, 2014	KLXI	KLX	CVEO	Civeo	Spin-off.
December 9, 2014	THS	TreeHouse Foods	CNVR	Conversant	Acquisition.
December 8, 2014	IPGP	IPG Photonics	CPWR	Compuware	Acquisition.
December 4, 2014	BMS	Bemis	CNQR	Concur Technologies	Acquisition.
December 4, 2014	TYL	Tyler Technologies	TIBX	TIBCO Software	Acquisition.
November 28, 2014	CRC	California Resources	RYAM	Rayonier Advanced Materials	Acquisition.
November 24, 2014	WNR	Western Refining	BYI	Bally Technologies	Acquisition.
November 4, 2014	JBL	Jabil Circuit	TWTC	TW Telecom	Acquisition.
October 31, 2014	KEYS	Keysight Technologies	UVV	Universal	Spin-off.
October 31, 2014	HYH	Halyard Health	ADTN	ADTRAN	Spin-off.
October 17, 2014	SKT	Tanger Factory Outlet Centers	URS	URS	Market capitalization change.
September 30, 2014	CDK	CDK Global Inc.	BBG	Bill Barrett Corporation	Bill Barrett's market capitalization is below $1.2 billion.
September 19, 2014	GHC	Graham Holdings	URI	United Rentals	Market capitalization change.
September 19, 2014	BTU	Peabody Energy	UHS	Universal Health Services	Market capitalization change.
September 19, 2014	CGNX	Cognex	WABC	Westamerica Bancorporation	Market capitalization change.
September 3, 2014	CNC	Centene	MCRS	MICROS Systems	Market capitalization change.
August 18, 2014	RDC	Rowan	MNK	Mallinckrodt	Market capitalization change.
August 14, 2014	ULTI	The Ultimate Software Group	HSH	The Hillshire Brands	Acquisition.
July 1, 2014	X	United States Steel	MLM	Martin Marietta Materials	Market capitalization change.
June 30, 2014	LHO	LaSalle Hotel Properties	AMG	Affiliated Managers Group	Spin-off.
June 30, 2014	TMST	TimkenSteel	GHL	Greenhill & Co.	Spin-off.
June 30, 2014	BDC	Belden	FNF	Fidelity National Financial	Spin-off.
June 27, 2014	RYAM	Rayonier Advanced Materials	IPI	Intrepid Potash	Acquisition.
June 20, 2014	IGT	International Game Technology	XEC	Cimarex Energy	Market capitalization change.
June 20, 2014	LYV	Live Nation Entertainment	MASI	Masimo	Market capitalization change.
June 20, 2014	ARRS	ARRIS Group	BCO	The Brink's Company	Market capitalization change.
June 6, 2014	TIME	Time Inc.	BOBE	Bob Evans Farms	Spin-off.
May 30, 2014	DNOW	NOW	BGC	General Cable	Spin-off.
May 30, 2014	CVEO	Civeo	MATW	Matthews International	Spin-off.
May 28, 2014	WPG	Washington Prime Group	UTIW	UTi Worldwide	Spin-off.
April 30, 2014	SLM	SLM	ANR	Alpha Natural Resources	Spin-off.
April 30, 2014	POL	PolyOne	UAA	Under Armour	Spin-off.
April 17, 2014	UMPQ	Umpqua Holdings	SGMS	Scientific Games	Acquisition.
April 1, 2014	CLF	Cliff Natural Resources	ESS	Essex Property	Acquisition.
April 1, 2014	FEIC	FEI Company	BRE	BRE Properties	Acquisition.
March 21, 2014	WPX	WPX Energy	GMCR	Keurig Green Mountain	Market capitalization change.
March 21, 2014	KATE	Kate Spade & Company	MATX	Matson	Market capitalization change.
February 28, 2014	KN	Knowles Corporation	AINV	Apollo Investment	Spin-off.
January 31, 2014	OGS	ONE Gas	VCI	Valassis Communications	Spin-off.
January 28, 2014	FTNT	Fortinet	HTSI	Harris Teeter Supermarkets	Acquisition.
January 28, 2014	SIRO	Sirona Dental Systems	HMA	Health Management Associates	Acquisition.
January 23, 2014	ALGN	Align Technology	TSCO	Tractor Supply	Market capitalization change.
January 2, 2014	RNR	RenaissanceRe Holdings	LPS	Lender Processing Services	Acquisition.
December 23, 2013	HAIN	The Hain Celestial Group	NVE	NV Energy	Acquisition.
December 20, 2013	TER	Teradyne	SCHL	Scholastic	Market capitalization change.
December 20, 2013	ANF	Abercrombie & Fitch	ADS	Alliance Data Systems	Market capitalization change.
December 20, 2013	JDSU	JDS Uniphase	MHK	Mohawk Industries	Market capitalization change.
December 20, 2013	ODFL	Old Dominion Freight Line	ACI	Arch Coal	Market capitalization change.
December 20, 2013	BC	Brunswick	RGS	Regis	Market capitalization change.
November 4, 2013	AOS	A.O. Smith	SKS	Saks	Acquisition.
September 27, 2013	SAIC	Science Applications International	BKS	Barnes & Noble	Market capitalization change.
September 26, 2013	CBST	Cubist Pharmaceuticals	SFD	Smithfield Foods	Acquisition.
September 20, 2013	AMD	Advanced Micro Devices	VRTX	Vertex Pharmaceuticals	Market capitalization change.
September 20, 2013	SAI	SAIC	AME	Ametek	Market capitalization change.
August 30, 2013	MUSA	Murphy USA	STRA	Strayer Education	Spin-off.
July 30, 2013	SLXP	Salix Pharmaceuticals	GDI	Gardner Denver	Acquisition.
June 28, 2013	APOL	Apollo Group	FST	Forest Oil	Spin-off.
June 28, 2013	MNK	Mallinckrodt	TLAB	Tellabs	Spin-off.
June 21, 2013	FHN	First Horizon National	QLGC	QLogic	Market capitalization change.
May 30, 2013	DPZ	Domino's Pizza	PXP	Plains Exploration & Production	Acquisition.
May 23, 2013	DF	Dean Foods	KSU	Kansas City Southern	Market capitalization change.
May 23, 2013	WWAV	WhiteWave Foods	KWK	Quicksilver Resources	Market capitalization change.
May 8, 2013	DDD	3D Systems	MAC	The Macerich Company	Market capitalization change.
May 1, 2013	CST	CST Brands	NOG	Northern Oil & Gas	Spin-off.
April 30, 2013	EXP	Eagle Materials	REGN	Regeneron Pharmaceuticals	Market capitalization change.
February 28, 2013	KRC	Kilroy Realty	JEF	Jefferies Group	Market capitalization change.
February 12, 2013	PRI	Primerica	SHAW	The Shaw Group	Acquisition.
January 29, 2013	EXR	Extra Space Storage	RAH	Ralcorp	Market capitalization change.
December 31, 2012	FII	Federated Investors	ESI	ITT Educational Services	Spin-off.
December 21, 2012	UNFI	United Natural Foods	AGP	AMERIGROUP	Acquisition.
December 11, 2012	RRD	R.R. Donnelley	MRX	Medicis Pharmaceutical	Acquisition.
October 4, 2012	CAB	Cabela's	PETM	PetSmart	Market capitalization change.
October 1, 2012	ANR	Alpha Natural Resources	KFY	Korn/Ferry	Market capitalization change.
October 1, 2012	GWR	Genesee & Wyoming	PSS	Collective Brands	Acquisition.
September 28, 2012	LXK	Lexmark	RSH	RadioShack	Spin-off.
September 28, 2012	DV	DeVry	PNR	Pentair	Spin-off.
August 7, 2012	JAH	Jarden	LNCR	Lincare Holdings	Acquisition.
July 31, 2012	SWI	SolarWinds	GPRO	Gen-Probe	Acquisition.
June 29, 2012	ALEX	Alexander & Baldwin	PCX	Patriot Coal	Spin-off.
June 28, 2012	HSH	Hillshire Brands	MNST	Monster Beverage	Spin-off.
May 15, 2012	TPX	Tempur-Pedic International	TNB	Thomas & Betts	Acquisition.
April 30, 2012	SVU	SUPERVALU	AM	American Greetings	Market capitalization change.
March 26, 2012	WXS	Wright Express	SUG	Southern Union	Market capitalization change.
February 3, 2012	POST	Post Holdings	CRK	Comstock Resources	Market capitalization change.
January 13, 2012	CRI	Carter's	NDN	99¢ Only Stores	Market capitalization change.

== See also ==
- List of S&P 500 companies
- List of S&P 600 companies
