= New Jersey Resources =

New Jersey Resources Corporation
- Type: Public company
- Traded as: NYSE: NJR; S&P 400 component
- Founded: 1981; 45 years ago
- Headquarters: Wall Township, New Jersey, U.S.
- Number of employees: 1,350 (2023)
- Website: njresources.com

New Jersey Resources is an energy services holding company based in Wall Township, New Jersey. It is a Fortune 1000 company, and a member of the Forbes Platinum 400. New Jersey Natural Gas is its principal subsidiary.
