= RenaissanceRe =

Bermudian company

RenaissanceRe Holdings Ltd
- Type: Public
- Traded as: NYSE: RNR; S&P 400 Component
- Industry: Financial Services
- Founded: 1993
- Headquarters: Bermuda,
- Key people: Kevin O'Donnell (CEO)
- Website: www.renre.com

RenaissanceRe Holdings Ltd is a global provider of reinsurance and insurance that specializes in matching desirable risk with efficient capital. The Company provides property, casualty and specialty reinsurance and certain insurance solutions to customers, principally through intermediaries. Established in 1993, and headquartered in Bermuda, RenaissanceRe has offices across North America, Europe, and the Asia-Pacific region.
