= RLI Corp. =

American insurance company

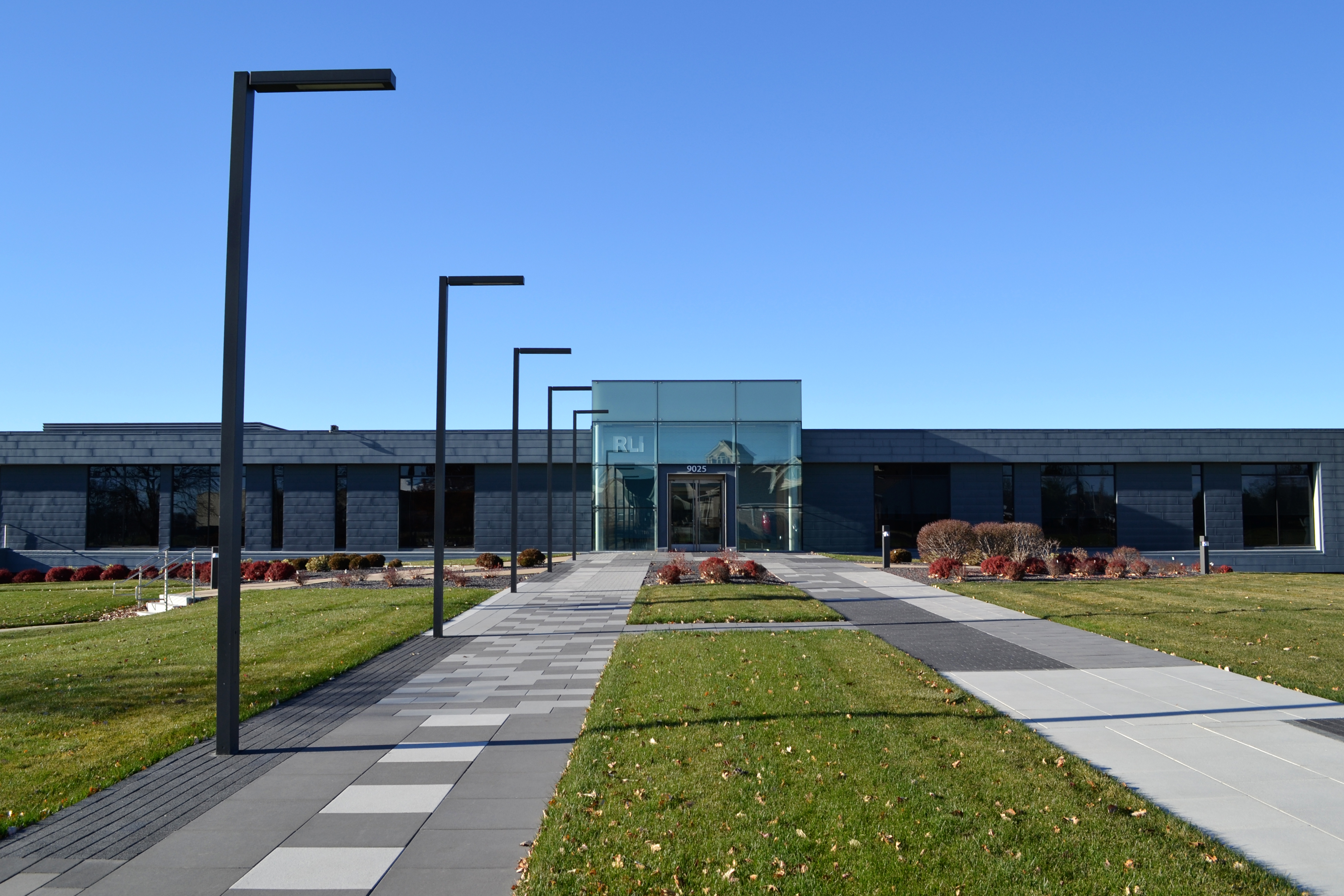
- Headquarters in Peoria, Illinois
- Type: Public
- Traded as: NYSE: RLI; S&P 400 component
- Industry: Insurance
- Founded: 1965
- Founder: Gerald D. Stephens
- Headquarters: 9025 N Lindbergh Dr, Peoria, Illinois, U.S.
- Key people: Craig W. Kliethermes (President, CEO)
- Services: Insurance
- Revenue: ▲US$1.88 billion (2025)
- Net income: ▲US$403 million (2025)
- Number of employees: 887 (2018)
- Website: rlicorp.com

RLI Corp. is an American insurance company specializing in property insurance and casualty insurance. It is headquartered in Peoria, Illinois.

RLI conducts its operations primarily through four insurance subsidiaries — RLI Insurance Company, Mt. Hawley Insurance Company, RLI Indemnity Company, and Contractors Bonding and Insurance Company.

== History ==
Founded in 1965 by Gerald D. Stephens, Replacement Lens, Inc. (RLI) was one of the first insurers of contact lenses. In 1970, RLI's statistics predicted 580 losses a year for every 1,000 contact lens owners. In a Rough Notes magazine article, Stephens said, "At that time, it cost around $200 to replace a pair of lenses, and most of the people who wore them were young and couldn't afford to take that risk."

Eventually, the company emerged as one of the leading contact lens insurers in the United States. Building upon its success in the contact lens market, RLI further expanded its business into other niche insurance markets. For example, in 1982 they administered pet insurance for an Arizona veterinarian. RLI also entered the Hawaii homeowner's market in 1996 by purchasing the business of the Hawaii Property Insurance Association (HPIA). Many insurers do not offer property insurance in places with high catastrophe exposures, but RLI has introduced business lines with difference in conditions (DIC) coverage.

Over time, the demand for contact lens insurance shrank with the emergence of more affordable disposable soft lenses. In order to remain competitive, Stephens expanded RLI's offerings to include commercial property and liability insurance. In 1994, the company retired its founding contact lens insurance product and in 1996 RLI sold its RLI Vision unit to Maui Jim, a manufacturer of luxury sunglasses.

In 2013, RLI invested $20 million in renovations of their Peoria headquarters. In 2015, RLI announced a $15 million addition as the next phase of their renovation.

== Key people ==
Jonathan E. Michael was chief executive officer from 2001 to December 2021, and chairman from 2011. Craig W. Kliethermes, who had been president and chief operating officer since 2016, having joined the company in 2006, became CEO in January 2022.
