= Watsco =

American industrial company

Watsco, Inc.
- Company type: Public
- Traded as: NYSE: WSO; NYSE: WSO.B (Class B); S&P 400 Component (WSO)
- Industry: HVAC/R Distribution
- Founded: 1956, Florida
- Headquarters: Miami, Florida, US
- Number of locations: 673 (2022)
- Key people: Albert H. Nahmad; (Chairman & CEO); Aaron J. Nahmad; (President); Ana M. Menendez; (CFO)
- Products: HVAC parts and supplies
- Revenue: ▲US$ 7.27 billion (2022)
- Operating income: ▲US$ 831.58 million (2022)
- Net income: ▲US$ 703.70 million (2022)
- Total assets: ▲US$ 3.49 billion (2022)
- Total equity: ▲US$ 2.25 billion (2022)
- Number of employees: 7,300 (2022)
- Website: www.watsco.com

Watsco, Inc. is a distributor of air conditioning, heating and refrigeration equipment, and related parts and supplies (HVAC/R) in the United States. Watsco was founded more than 60 years ago as a manufacturer of parts, components, and tools used in the HVAC/R industry. In 1989, the company shifted from manufacturing to distribution, by acquiring Gemaire Distributors Inc., a South Florida-based Rheem distributor.

== Key dates ==
1947: The company, Wagner Tool & Supply Corp., is founded in New York
1956: Watsco, Inc. incorporated in Florida
1963: The company goes public
1972: Albert H. Nahmad becomes chairman, president and CEO
1989: Watsco acquires an 80% interest in Gemaire in Florida and shifts focus to distribution
1990: The company acquires a 50.5% interest in Heating & Cooling Supply in California
1993: Watsco acquires an 80% interest in Comfort Supply in Texas
1996: Watsco purchases minority interests of Gemaire, Heating & Cooling & Comfort Supply
1997: The company acquires locations from Carrier and ICP; enters refrigeration market
1998: Watsco sells its manufacturing operation; revenues reach US$1 billion
2005: The company acquires East Coast Metal Distributors, a distributor of Goodman products
2009: Watsco forms first joint venture with Carrier Corporation; revenues reach US$2 billion
2011: The company enters Mexico
2012: Watsco enters Canada and revenues exceed US$3 billion
2015: The company's revenues reach US$4 billion
2019: Watsco expanded its presence in the Northeast
2020: The company's revenues reach US$5 billion
2021: Watsco acquires Temperature Equipment Corporation (TEC) to expand its presence in the Midwest. Revenues reach US$6 billion
2022: The company's revenues reach US$7 billion and the company was named to the Fortune 500 list
2025: Watsco Acquires Southern Ice Equipment Distributors
