= Advanced Drainage Systems =

American drainage product company based in Hillard, Ohio, US

Advanced Drainage Systems, Inc.
- Type: Public
- Traded as: NYSE: WMS; S&P 400 component
- Industry: Water industry
- Founded: 1966; 60 years ago
- Founders: Ron Martin; Marty Sixt
- Headquarters: Hilliard, Ohio, U.S.
- Key people: D. Scott Barbour (CEO & President); Scott A. Cottrill (CFO)
- Products: HDPE pipes; Septic tanks; Water filters
- Revenue: ▲US$1.982 billion (2020)
- Net income: ▲US$224 million (2020)
- Total assets: ▲US$2.413 billion (2020)
- Total equity: ▲US$819 million (2020)
- Number of employees: 5,000 (2020)
- Website: adspipe.com

Advanced Drainage Systems, Inc. (ADS) is an American company that designs, manufactures and markets polypropylene and polyethylene pipes, plastic leach field chambers and systems, septic tanks and accessories, storm retention/detention and septic chambers, polyvinyl chloride drainage structures, fittings, and water filters and water separators. It is the largest maker of high-density polyethylene pipe in the United States. It is headquartered in Hilliard, Ohio. In 2020, 93% of the company's sales were in the United States and 6% were in Canada.

In 2026, Advanced Drainage Systems was ranked thirtieth in Time Magazine's World Most Impactful Companies.

== History ==
The company was founded in 1966 by Ron Martin and Marty Sixt, two engineers. In the early 1970s, it moved to central Ohio.

In 2004, Joe Chlapaty became CEO of the company; he retired in 2017 and was succeeded by Scott Barbour.

In July 2014, the company became a public company via an initial public offering on the New York Stock Exchange, raising $232 million.

In February 2015, the company acquired Ideal Pipe of Ontario for $45 million.

In July 2019, the company acquired Infiltrator Water Technologies from the Ontario Teachers' Pension Plan for $1.08 billion.

In 2019, approximately 65% of its pipes were made from recycled materials.
