= HealthEquity =

Healthcare Company

HealthEquity, Inc.
- Company type: Public
- Traded as: Nasdaq: HQY; S&P 400 component
- Founded: 1 January 2002
- Headquarters: Draper, Utah, U.S., Draper, UT
- Key people: Scott Cutler, President and CEO Steve Neeleman, Founder and Vice Chairman
- Revenue: ▲US$756.6 million (FY ended 1/31/2022)
- Operating income: ▼ -US$24.238 million (FY ended 1/31/2022)
- Net income: ▼ -US$44.3 million (FY ended 1/31/2022)
- Total assets: ▲US$3.107 billion (FY ended 1/31/2022)
- Total equity: ▲US$1.852 billion (FY ended 1/31/2022)
- Number of employees: ▲3,688 (January 2022)
- Website: healthequity.com

HealthEquity, Inc. is an American financial technology and business services company that is designated as a non-bank health savings trustee by the IRS. This designation allows HealthEquity to be the custodian of health savings accounts regardless of which financial institution the funds are deposited with.

As of July 31, 2022, HealthEquity managed 7.5 million HSA accounts, plus 7 million other consumer-directed benefits ("CDBs") for total accounts of 14.5 million. Total HSA assets as of July 31, 2022 were $20.5 billion, including $13.1 billion of HSA cash and $7.4 billion of HSA investments.

== History ==
HealthEquity was incorporated in January 2002 in Tucson, Arizona by Stephen Neeleman, Nuno Battaglia, and David Hall to reintroduce consumer-driven health care (CDH). It moved its incorporation to Utah in February 2004. HealthEquity went public via an IPO on July 31, 2014, under the symbol "HQY". Healthequity had a massive data breach in March 2024 exposing addressees, social security numbers, as well as HIPAA protected patient information such as diagnoses and medications, of over 4 million patients.

== Acquisitions ==
In August 2019, HealthEquity acquired WageWorks.

In March 2021, HealthEquity acquired Luum and expanded the Commuter benefit offering. In November 2021, HealthEquity acquired Further.

In May 2024, HealthEquity acquired BenefitWallet, a Health Savings Account (HSA), owned by Conduent Inc.
