= Penumbra (medical company) =

American medical device company

Penumbra, Inc.
- Type: Public
- Traded as: NYSE: PEN; S&P 400 component
- Industry: Medical supplies
- Founded: 2004; 22 years ago
- Founders: Arani Bose; Adam Elsesser
- Headquarters: Alameda, California, U.S.
- Area served: Worldwide
- Key people: Adam Elsesser (CEO)
- Products: Medical devices
- Revenue: ▲US$1.40 billion (2025)
- Net income: ▲US$178 million (2025)
- Number of employees: 4,500 (2024)
- Website: penumbrainc.com

Penumbra, Inc. is an American medical device company headquartered in Alameda, California. The company was founded by Arani Bose and Adam Elsesser in 2004. It manufactures devices for interventional therapies to treat vascular conditions such as stroke and aneurysm.

In January 2026, Boston Scientific announced it would acquire Penumbra in a $15 billion cash and stock deal. The deal was expected to close by year-end.

== History ==
Penumbra was founded in 2004 and manufactures several medical devices but specializes in the neuro/vascular market and creates devices that help treat aneurysms and ischemic stroke.

In 2014, Penumbra launched its Apollo system, a device that “enables minimally invasive removal of deeply seated tissue and fluids in the brain,” allowing for otherwise inoperable blood clots to be removed.

In 2015 the company issued an initial public offering on the New York Stock Exchange. In 2018 the company acquired 40% of the outstanding shares of virtual reality joint venture MVI Health. In 2017 the company acquired the Italian distributor Crossmed.

== Criticism ==
Criticism of Penumbra has followed various aspects of its products and business practices. In 2016 a lawsuit claimed the Penumbra Coil 400 caused brain damage after surgery. The company's specialized catheter has been linked to the deaths of stroke patients, and it was a target of stock short sellers in 2020. According to the Foundation for Financial Journalism, this is a significant dilemma.

A request has been sent to The SEC and U.S. Food and Drug Administration to launch an investigation. A scientist who has published research articles showing the reliability of Penumbra's medical products is (allegedly) an internet fabrication.

== Recalls ==
In 2011 the company recalled its Penumbra Coil 400. In 2017 the company recalled a 3D revascularization device. In 2020 the company recalled one of its catheter used during heart surgery due to increased risk of mortality and serious injury.
