= Grand Canyon Education =

Corporation based in Phoenix, Arizona

Grand Canyon Education, Inc.
- Formerly: Significant Education, Inc.
- Type: Public
- Traded as: Nasdaq: LOPE; S&P 400 component
- Industry: For-profit education
- Founded: 2003; 23 years ago
- Founders: Christopher C. Richardson; Brent D. Richardson
- Headquarters: Phoenix, Arizona, U.S.
- Key people: Brian Mueller (chairman, CEO); W. Stan Meyer (COO); Daniel E. Bachus (CFO); Dilek Marsh (CTO)
- Number of employees: 5,800
- Subsidiaries: Orbis Education Services
- Website: gce.com

Grand Canyon Education, Inc. (GCE) is an American for-profit corporation that provides services to universities, specializing in program development, online education, and operational support. Formerly affiliated with Grand Canyon University (GCU), a Christian university in Arizona, GCE became a separate publicly traded company (Nasdaq: LOPE) in 2008.

== Origins ==
Grand Canyon Education was originally founded as Significant Education, LLC and was based in California as a subsidiary of education entrepreneur Michael K. Clifford's company. Clifford became managing director of Grand Canyon University when Significant Education's 2004 acquisition of the, at the time, financially-struggling University was approved by the GCU Board of trustees. After the acquisition, the former board of trustees served Clifford in an advisory role. Significant Education was incorporated in 2005 and became publicly traded under Grand Canyon Education, Inc starting in 2008. GCE trades on NASDAQ under the ticker symbol "LOPE".

== Controversies ==
There have been growing controversies regarding Grand Canyon Education's relationship with Grand Canyon University as it has been widely believed that the two entities are too intertwined. One frequently cited reason for said belief is because Brian Mueller, the president and CEO of GCE, concurrently serves as the president of GCU.

It was alleged that GCU attempted to switch from for-profit status to non-profit status via its relationship with GCE to reduce the burden of its yearly $9.2 million property tax bill. Some critics of for-profit education criticized the relationship between GCU and Grand Canyon Education, Inc. as being too intertwined.

Although some organizations have approved this transition, the U.S. Department of Education still classifies the university as a for-profit university. The government specifically stated that GCU is a captive client of Grand Canyon Education, and the college is operating for the benefit of shareholders of a for-profit company.

Grand Canyon Education has also been accused of securities-law fraud due to its relation to GCU.

== Subsidiaries ==
In December 2018, Grand Canyon Education announced it acquired Orbis Education Services, an education services provider that assists universities with pre-licensure healthcare program management
