= SiTime =

American micro-electromechanical systems chipmaker

SiTime Corporation
- Type: Public
- Traded as: Nasdaq: SITM; S&P 400 component
- Industry: Semiconductor
- Founded: 2005; 21 years ago
- Founders: Marcus Lutz; Aaron Partridge
- Headquarters: Santa Clara, California, U.S.
- Key people: Rajesh Vashist (chairman, president & CEO)
- Products: Micro-electromechanical systems (MEMS)
- Revenue: ▲US$283.61 million (2022)
- Operating income: ▲US$16.14 million (2022)
- Net income: ▲US$23.34 million (2022)
- Total assets: ▲US$750.62 million (2022)
- Total equity: ▲US$708.48 million (2022)
- Owner: Megachips (24%)
- Number of employees: 377 (December 31, 2022)
- Website: sitime.com

SiTime Corporation is a publicly traded fabless chipmaker based in Santa Clara, California that develops micro-electromechanical systems (MEMS), used for timing devices in electronics.

== History ==
SiTime was founded in Santa Clara, California in 2005 by researchers Marcus Lutz and Aaron Partridge.

In 2014, the company was acquired for $200 million by Japanese fabless semiconductor company MegaChips.

In November 2019, SiTime was spun off and went public. MegaChips is a shareholder that owns 25%.

In January 2021, based on SiTime's 2020 stock gain, Investors Business Daily included the company on its list of the 100 best stocks of 2020.

== Products ==
SiTime manufactures silicon-based MEMS timing devices, used as an alternative to quartz timers in precision timing applications such as controlling the timing of electronic systems, managing electronic transfer of data, setting radio frequencies or measuring time. It provides MEMS resonators, oscillators and clocks.

== Operations ==
SiTime is headquartered in Santa Clara, California. It also operates a research center in Dexter, Michigan. In its 2021 annual report, the company reported 279 full time employees in the United States, France, Malaysia, the Netherlands, Taiwan, Japan and Ukraine.
