= AppFolio =

American real estate software services company

AppFolio, Inc.
- Type: Public
- Traded as: Nasdaq: APPF (Class A); S&P 400 component
- Industry: Software
- Founded: 2006; 20 years ago
- Founders: Klaus Schauser; Jon Walker
- Headquarters: Santa Barbara, California, U.S.
- Area served: United States
- Key people: Shane Trigg (CEO); Andreas von Blottnitz (chairman)
- Products: AppFolio Property Manager; AppFolio Investment Manager
- Services: Software as a service
- Revenue: ▲US$950 million (2025)
- Operating income: ▲US$153 million (2025)
- Net income: ▼US$140 million (2025)
- Total assets: ▲US$688 million (2025)
- Total equity: ▲US$542 million (2025)
- Number of employees: 1,634 (2025)
- Website: appfolio.com
- Footnotes; Financials as of December 31, 2025.

AppFolio, Inc. is an American company founded in 2006 that offers software-as-a-service (SaaS) applications and services to the real estate industry.

The company's headquarters is in Goleta, California, in the Santa Barbara area.

== History ==
AppFolio was established in 2006 by co-founders Klaus Schauser and Jon Walker. Schauser had previously founded Expertcity.

The company's first focus was property management for small to medium businesses and its first product, AppFolio Property Manager, was launched in 2007.

In November 2012, AppFolio acquired MyCase, a "legal practice management software provider."

AppFolio purchased real estate software firm RentLinx in April 2015. This acquisition included rights to the website ShowMeTheRent.com, which increased AppFolio's listing presence.

In May 2015, AppFolio announced its Initial public offering, which was unveiled in June.

In September 2018, AppFolio reported acquisition of utility analytics software WegoWise.

In January 2019, AppFolio acquired Dynasty Marketplace, Inc., for $60 million.

In September 2020, AppFolio announced the sale of MyCase to private equity firm Apax Funds, for approximately $193 million.

== Products ==
=== AppFolio Property Manager ===
AppFolio Property Manager is a cloud-based property management platform used to manage residential and commercial rental operations, including leasing, accounting, and resident communications. The platform was expanded in 2022 with the AppFolio Stack, a marketplace for other real-estate software that can be integrated with its products.
