= Mueller Industries =

American manufacturing company

Mueller Industries, Inc.
- Company type: Public
- Traded as: NYSE: MLI; S&P 400 component
- Industry: Piping
- Founded: 1917; 109 years ago
- Headquarters: Collierville, Tennessee, United States
- Key people: Gregory L. Christopher (CEO since 2009)
- Products: Pipes, industrial metals
- Number of employees: c. 4,509 (December 2023)
- Website: muellerindustries.com

Mueller Industries is an American manufacturing company that specializes in piping, industrial metals and climate machinery. It was founded in 1917 and is included on the Fortune 1000 list in 2022. The head office of the company is located in Memphis, Tennessee. Mueller Industries, Inc. is a multi-billion dollar revenue company that is publicly traded.

The company has operations throughout the United States, Canada, Mexico, China, South Korea, the Middle East and Great Britain. The current CEO of the company is Gregory L. Christopher, appointed in 2009.

== History ==
The company was founded in 1917.

== Products ==
Mueller Industries, Inc. manufactures and sells copper, brass, aluminum, and plastic products in the United States, Canada, Mexico, Great Britain, South Korea and China. It operates in three segments, Plumbing, Industrial Metals & Climate Equipment.

The Plumbing & Refrigeration segment offers copper tubes in straight lengths and coils; copper and plastic fittings, line sets, plastic pipes, valves, and related components for use in water distribution systems, heating systems, air-conditioning, and refrigeration applications, as well as for drainage, waste, and vent systems. It also fabricates steel pipe nipples and resells imported brass and plastic plumbing valves, malleable iron fittings, faucets, and plumbing specialty products to plumbing wholesalers and building materials retailers, as well as to distributors of manufactured housing and recreational vehicle industries. This segment markets its products through its sales offices and distribution centers, and a network of agents.
