= Watts Water Technologies =

American manufacturing company

Watts Water Technologies, Inc.
- Type: Public
- Traded as: Nasdaq: WTS; S&P 400 component
- Founded: 1874; 152 years ago in Lawrence, Massachusetts
- Founder: Joseph E. Watts
- Headquarters: North Andover, Massachusetts
- Key people: Robert J. Pagano, CEO, President, & Chairman
- Revenue: ▲$2.438 billion (2025)
- Net income: ▲$340 million (2025)
- Total assets: ▲$2.881 billion (2025)
- Total equity: ▲$2.027 billion (2025)
- Number of employees: 5,700 (2025)
- Website: www.watts.com

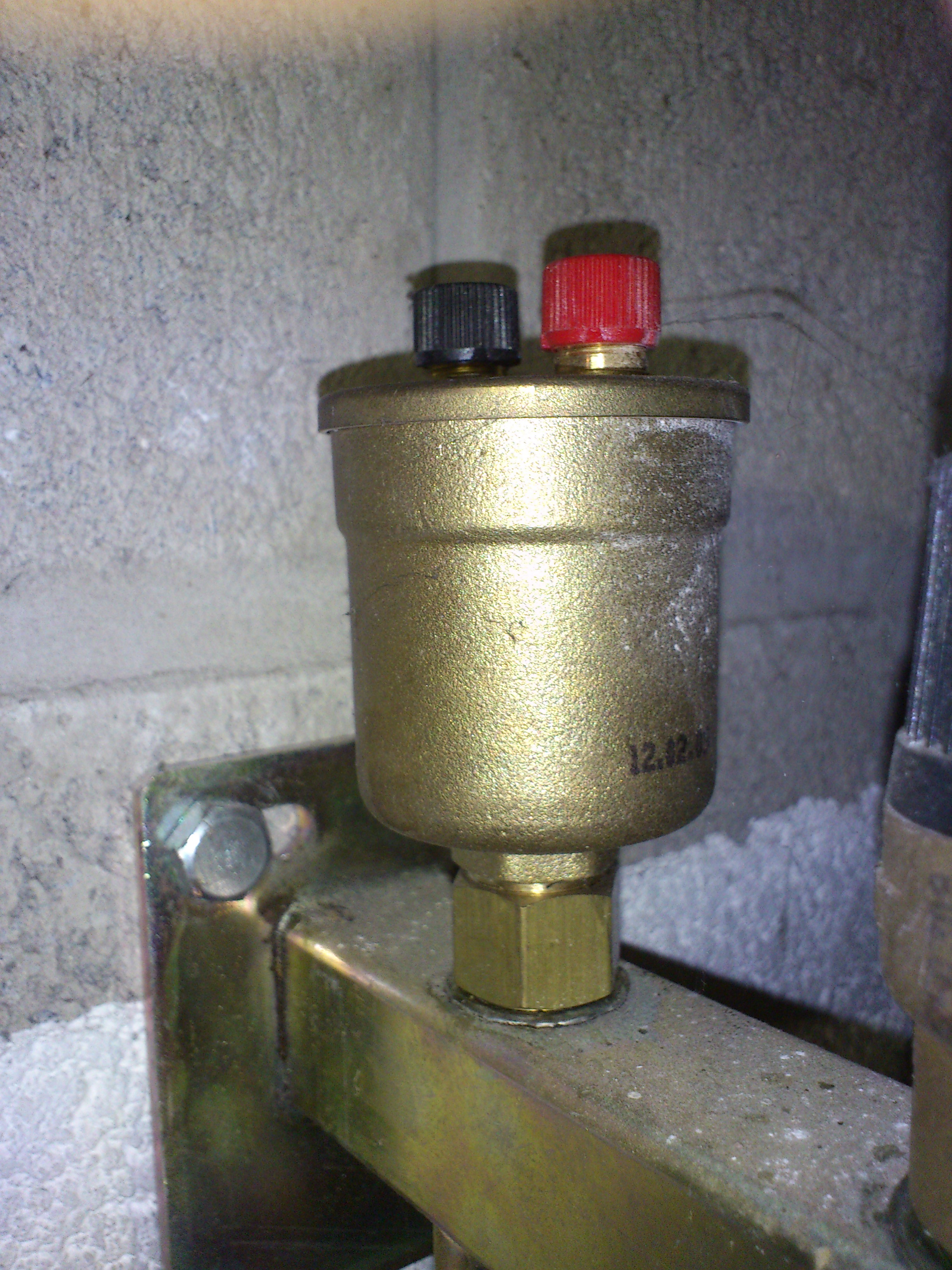
A Watts pressure release valve

Watts Water Technologies, Inc., based in North Andover, Massachusetts, manufactures valve products for plumbing and heating, such as water pressure regulators and other valves. Watts is one of the largest manufacturers of water valves in the United States.

The company was formerly known as Watts Industries Inc.

The company's main location is in North Andover, Massachusetts, and it operates a regional distribution center in Franklin, New Hampshire.

== History ==
The company was founded in 1874 by Joseph E. Watts in Lawrence, Massachusetts.

Watts created a type of safety valve known as the temperature and pressure valve (T&P valve), which was used for safely venting hot-water supply tank systems, reducing the risk of explosion. By the time of World War II, the U.S. Army required Watts T&P valves on all army hot-water supply tanks.

In August 1986, the company became a public company via an initial public offering.

In December 2005, the company acquired Dormont Manufacturing for $95 million.

In June 2006, the company acquired Kim Olofsson Safe.

In April 2011, the company acquired Danfoss Scola for $176 million.

In October 2011, the company agreed to pay $3.8 million to the United States Securities and Exchange Commission to resolve allegations that it made improper payments to employees of state-owned design institutes in China.

In October 2023, the company acquired Bradley Corporation for $303 million.
