= Historical components of the S&P 600 =

History of components of the S&P 600

S&P Dow Jones Indices updates the components of stock market indices periodically, typically in response to acquisitions, corporate spin-offs, or upon quarterly rebalancing. The following is a list of historical changes to the components of the S&P 600:

| Date | Added | | Removed | | Reason | Refs |
| Date | Ticker | Security | Ticker | Security | Reason | Refs |
|---|---|---|---|---|---|---|
| August 4, 2026 | ADIG | ADI Global Distribution | HTZ | Hertz Global Holdings | Resideo completed the corporate spin-off of ADI Global Distribution. | |
| August 3, 2026 | FIVN | Five9 | TWO | Two Harbors Investment | FIVN replaced TWO after it was acquired by CrossCountry Mortgage. | |
| July 27, 2026 | VVX | V2X, Inc. | AVNS | Avanos Medical | V2X replaced AVNS after it was acquired by American Industrial Partners. | |
| July 24, 2026 | TPC | Tutor Perini | KRYS | Krystal Biotech | TPC replaced KRYS, which replaced Taylor Morrison in the S&P 400 after it was acquired by Berkshire Hathaway. | |
| July 22, 2026 | ROAD | Construction Partners | MOH | Molina Healthcare | ROAD replaced MOH, which replaced National Storage Affiliates Trust in the S&P 400 after it was acquired by Public Storage. | |
| July 17, 2026 | KRMN | Karman Holdings | BTSG | BrightSpring Health Services | KRMN replaced BTSG, which replaced Chart Industries in the S&P 400 after it was acquired by Baker Hughes. | |
| July 15, 2026 | SEI | Solaris Energy Infrastructure | CPRX | Catalyst Pharmaceuticals | SEI replaced CPRX after it was acquired by Angelini. | |
| July 8, 2026 | LEU | Centrus Energy | WSR | Whitestone REIT | LEU replaced WSR after it was acquired by Ares Management. | |
| July 8, 2026 | MFP | Midera Food Processing | RWT | Redwood Trust | Middleby completed the corporate spin-off of Midera Food Processing. | |
| July 6, 2026 | GT | Goodyear Tire and Rubber Company | STEL | Stellar Bancorp | STEL was acquired by Prosperity Bancshares. | |
| July 1, 2026 | MBGL | Mobility Global | CLB | Core Laboratories | S&P Global completed the corporate spin-off of Mobility Global. | |
| July 1, 2026 | GPOR | Gulfport Energy | SEM | Select Medical | GPOR replaced SEM after it was acquired by a consortium consisting of several executives of SEM and WCAS. | |
| July 1, 2026 | CAG | Conagra Brands | GDYN | Grid Dynamics Holdings | Market capitalization changes. | |
| July 1, 2026 | NHI | National Health Investors | ARI | Apollo Commercial Real Estate Finance | NHI replaced ARI after it announced liquidation and was no longer appropriate for the S&P 600. | |
| June 29, 2026 | NTST | NETSTREIT | PRA | ProAssurance | ProAssurance was acquired by The Doctors Company. | |
| June 22, 2026 | POOL | Pool Corporation | EMBC | Embecta | Market capitalization changes. | |
| June 22, 2026 | CPB | Campbell's | UHT | Universal Health Realty Income Trust | Market capitalization changes. | |
| June 22, 2026 | COTY | Coty | SMTC | Semtech | Market capitalization changes. | |
| June 22, 2026 | CNXC | Concentrix | SANM | Sanmina Corporation | Market capitalization changes. | |
| June 22, 2026 | BLKB | Blackbaud | VIAV | Viavi Solutions | Market capitalization changes. | |
| June 22, 2026 | CACC | Credit Acceptance | OXM | Oxford Industries | Market capitalization changes. | |
| June 22, 2026 | LAZ | Lazard | GOGO | Gogo Inflight Internet | Market capitalization changes. | |
| June 22, 2026 | EBC | Eastern Bankshares | PRAA | PRA Group | Market capitalization changes. | |
| June 22, 2026 | WSBC | WesBanco | IIIN | Insteel Industries | Market capitalization changes. | |
| June 22, 2026 | WRBY | Warby Parker | ETD | Ethan Allen Interiors | Market capitalization changes. | |
| June 22, 2026 | NIC | Nicolet Bankshares | CTKB | Cytek Biosciences | Market capitalization changes. | |
| June 22, 2026 | LQDA | Liquidia | MNRO | Monro Muffler Brake | Market capitalization changes. | |
| June 22, 2026 | RSI | Rush Street Interactive | VITL | Vital Farms | Market capitalization changes. | |
| June 22, 2026 | USLM | United States Lime & Minerals | CABO | Cable One | Market capitalization changes. | |
| June 22, 2026 | IVT | InvenTrust Properties | FWRD | Forward Air | Market capitalization changes. | |
| June 16, 2026 | FA | First Advantage | KW | Kennedy Wilson | FA replaced KW after it was acquired by consortium led by KW's CEO, William J. McMorrow, with Fairfax Financial. | |
| June 9, 2026 | DMC | Del Monte Corporation | FDP | Fresh Del Monte Produce Inc. | DMC replaced FDP after Fresh Del Monte was renamed to Del Monte Corporation. | |
| June 2, 2026 | EPAM | EPAM Systems | SSTK | Shutterstock | SSTK merged with Getty Images. | |
| June 1, 2026 | DAVE | Dave | AMWD | American Woodmark | American Woodmark was acquired by MasterBrand Inc. | |
| May 27, 2026 | UTI | Universal Technical Institute | VRE | Veris Residential | Veris Residential was acquired by Affinius Capital and Vista Hill Partners. | |
| May 18, 2026 | PTON | Peloton Interactive | NVRI | Enviri | PTON replaced NVRI after it completed the corporate spin-off of assets into a new publicly traded company. The new publicly traded company was not representative of the small-cap market space. | |
| May 19, 2026 | FG | F&G | MCW | Mister Car Wash | FG replaced MCW after it was acquired by Leonard Green & Partners. | |
| May 18, 2026 | FLO | Flowers Foods | CSGS | CSG Systems | FLO replaced CSGS after it was acquired by NEC. | |
| May 14, 2026 | ALHC | Alignment Healthcare | SNCY | Sun Country Airlines | ALHC replaced SNCY after it was acquired by Allegiant Travel Company. | |
| May 14, 2026 | BFAM | Bright Horizons | TPH | Tri Pointe Homes | BFAM replaced TPH after it was acquired by Sumitomo Forestry. | |
| May 14, 2026 | RELY | Remitly | APLS | Apellis Pharmaceuticals | RELY replaced APLS after it was acquired by Biogen. | |
| May 8, 2026 | AGNT | eXp World Holdings, Inc. | EXPI | eXp World Holdings, Inc. | EXPI changed symbol to AGNT after coprorate rebrand. | |
| May 1, 2026 | LFST | Lifestance Health | GDEN | Golden Entertainment | LFST replaced GDEN after it was acquired by Vici Properties and Blake L. Sartini. | |
| April 24, 2026 | EFOR | Everforth Inc. | ASGN | ASGN Inc. | ASGN changed symbol to EFOR after corporate rebrand. | |
| April 10, 2026 | DBD | Diebold Nixdorf | SEE | Sealed Air | DBD replaced SEE after it was acquired by Clayton, Dubilier & Rice. | |
| April 9, 2026 | BNL | Broadstone Net Lease | DOCN | DigitalOcean | BNL replaced DOCN, which replaced Casey's in the S&P 400 after it was moved to the S&P 500. | |
| April 9, 2026 | ATMU | Atmus Filtration Technologies | AL | Air Lease Corporation | ATMU replaced AL after it was acquired by Sumitomo Corporation. | |
| April 2, 2026 | VGNT | Versigent | TWI | Titan Tire Corporation | Aptiv completed the corporate spin-off of Versigent. | |
| March 25, 2026 | COCO | Vita Coco | TGNA | Tegna Inc. | COCO replaced TGNA after it was acquired by Nexstar Media Group. | |
| March 23, 2026 | MTCH | Match Group | SOLS | Solstice Advanced Materials | Market capitalization changes. | |
| March 23, 2026 | MOH | Molina Healthcare | SITM | SiTime | Market capitalization changes. | |
| March 23, 2026 | LW | Lamb Weston | MOG.A | Moog Inc. | Market capitalization changes. | |
| March 23, 2026 | PAYC | Paycom | IDCC | InterDigital | Market capitalization changes. | |
| March 23, 2026 | VSEC | VSE Corporation | VICR | Vicor Corporation | Market capitalization changes. | |
| March 23, 2026 | AGX | Argan | CTRE | CareTrust REIT | Market capitalization changes. | |
| March 23, 2026 | RITM | Rithm Capital | PLAY | Dave & Buster's | Market capitalization changes. | |
| March 23, 2026 | LYFT | Lyft | SXC | SunCoke Energy | Market capitalization changes. | |
| March 23, 2026 | LAUR | Laureate Education | AHRT | AH Realty Trust | Market capitalization changes. | |
| March 23, 2026 | LTH | Life Time Group Holdings | INN | Summit Hotel Properties | Market capitalization changes. | |
| March 23, 2026 | LIF | Life360 | KREF | KKR Real Estate Finance Trust | Market capitalization changes. | |
| March 23, 2026 | SPHR | Sphere Entertainment | BLMN | Bloomin' Brands | Market capitalization changes. | |
| March 23, 2026 | GTM | ZoomInfo | MYGN | Myriad Genetics | Market capitalization changes. | |
| March 23, 2026 | ASGN | ASGN | CARS | Cars.com | Market capitalization changes. | |
| March 23, 2026 | KMPR | Kemper Corporation | ANGI | Angi Inc. | Market capitalization changes. | |
| March 13, 2026 | NSSC | Napco Security Technologies | ALEX | Alexander & Baldwin | NSSC replaced ALEX after it was acquired by an investor group comprising MW Group and funds affiliated with DivcoWest and Blackstone Inc.. | |
| February 12, 2026 | RNG | RingCentral | HI | Hillenbrand | RNG replaced HI after it was acquired by Lone Star Funds. | |
| February 11, 2026 | MBIN | Merchants Bancorp | THS | TreeHouse Foods | MBIN replaced THS after it was acquired by Investindustrial S.A. | |
| February 10, 2026 | OSW | OneSpaWorld Holdings | DVAX | Dynavax Technologies | OSW replaced DVAX after it was acquired by Sanofi. | |
| February 9, 2026 | ADT | ADT Inc. | ARWR | Arrowhead Pharmaceuticals | ADT replaced ARWR, which replaced Ciena in the S&P 400 after it was moved to the S&P 500. | |
| February 2, 2026 | LZ | LegalZoom | ELME | Elme Communities | LZ replaced ELME after ELME announced ongoing liquidation activities and was no longer appropriate for the S&P 600. | |
| February 2, 2026 | APLS | Apellis Pharmaceuticals | AEIS | Advanced Energy | APLS replaced AEIS, which replaced Comerica in the S&P 400 after it was acquired by Fifth Third Bank. | |
| January 30, 2026 | AMRX | Amneal Pharmaceuticals | TTMI | TTM Technologies | AMRX replaced TTMI, which replaced Civitas Resources in the S&P 400 after it was acquired by SM Energy. | |
| January 26, 2026 | WINA | Winmark | GES | Guess, Inc. | WINA replaced GES after it was acquired by Authentic Brands Group and the Rolling Stockholders. | |
| January 7, 2026 | VSNT | Versant | BDN | Brandywine Realty Trust | Comcast completed the corporate spin-off of Versant. | |
| December 26, 2025 | OPLN | OPENLANE | KAR | OPENLANE | Ticker symbol for OPENLANE changed from KAR to OPLN. | |
| December 22, 2025 | PRIM | Primoris Services Corporation | SPXC | SPX Corporation | PRIM replaced SPXC, which replaced Comfort Systems USA in the S&P 400 after it was moved to the S&P 500. | |
| December 22, 2025 | UA/UAA | Under Armour (Class A & C) | DY | Dycom Industries | Market capitalization changes. | |
| December 22, 2025 | POWI | Power Integrations | HL | Hecla Mining | Market capitalization changes. | |
| December 22, 2025 | PRGO | Perrigo | RC | Ready Capital | Market capitalization changes. | |
| December 22, 2025 | IRDM | Iridium Communications | SITC | SITE Centers | Market capitalization changes. | |
| December 22, 2025 | VAC | Marriott Vacations Worldwide | THRY | Thryv | Market capitalization changes. | |
| December 22, 2025 | NSP | Insperity | HELE | Helen of Troy Limited | Market capitalization changes. | |
| December 22, 2025 | CWST | Casella Waste Systems | ASIX | AdvanSix | Market capitalization changes. | |
| December 22, 2025 | INDV | Indivior | RGR | Sturm, Ruger & Co. | Market capitalization changes. | |
| December 22, 2025 | HE | Hawaiian Electric Industries | MGPI | MGP Ingredients | Market capitalization changes. | |
| December 22, 2025 | LKQ | LKQ Corporation | BWA | BorgWarner | Market capitalization changes. | |
| December 22, 2025 | SOLS | Solstice Advanced Materials | CEVA | CEVA, Inc. | Market capitalization changes. | |
| December 22, 2025 | MHK | Mohawk Industries | SCVL | Shoe Carnival | Market capitalization changes. | |
| December 15, 2025 | SEZL | Sezzle | VTLE | Vital Energy | Vital Energy was acquired by Crescent Energy. | |
| December 11, 2025 | VITL | Vital Farms | HSII | Heidrick & Struggles International | Heidrick & Struggles International was acquired by Advent International and Corvex Private Equity. | |
| December 2, 2025 | FIBK | First Interstate BancSystem | HBI | Hanesbrands | Hanesbrands was acquired by Gildan. | |
| November 28, 2025 | PTCT | PTC Therapeutics | SNDK | SanDisk | SanDisk replaced The Interpublic Group of Companies in the S&P 500 after it was acquired by Omnicom Group. | |
| November 28, 2025 | UPWK | Upwork | PINC | Premier | Premier was acquired by Patient Square Capital. | |
| November 13, 2025 | RRR | Red Rock Resorts, Inc. | STRL | Sterling Infrastructure | RRR replaced STRL, which replaced Light & Wonder in the S&P 400 after it delisted from the Nasdaq. | |
| November 4, 2025 | EMN | Eastman Chemical Company | CAL | Caleres | EMN was moved from the S&P 500 as it was more representative of the small cap market space. CAL was removed from the S&P 600 as it was no longer representative of the small-cap market space. | |
| October 31, 2025 | KMX | CarMax | USNA | USANA Health Sciences | KMX was moved from the S&P 500 as it was more representative of the small cap market space. USNA was removed from the S&P 600 as it was no longer representative of the small-cap market space. | |
| October 20, 2025 | BTSG | BrightSpring Health Services | VBTX | Veritex Holdings | BTSG replaced VBTX after it was acquired by Huntington Bancshares. | |
| October 6, 2025 | WU | Western Union | COOP | Mr. Cooper | COOP was acquired by Rocket Companies. WU was moved from the S&P 400 to replace it as it was more representative of the small cap market space. | |
| September 26, 2025 | ACMR | ACM Research | KLG | WK Kellogg Co | ACMR replaced KLG after it was acquired by Ferrero. | |
| September 24, 2025 | REYN | Reynolds Consumer Products | SPTN | SpartanNash | REYN replaced SPTN after it was acquired by C&S Wholesale Grocers. | |
| September 22, 2025 | HL | Hecla Mining | SLP | Simulations Plus | HL replaced SLP as it was no longer representative of the small-cap market space. | |
| September 22, 2025 | WAY | Waystar Holding | JACK | Jack in the Box | WAY replaced JACK as it was no longer representative of the small-cap market space. | |
| September 22, 2025 | QTWO | Q2 Holdings | BGS | B&G Foods | QTWO replaced BGS as it was no longer representative of the small-cap market space. | |
| September 22, 2025 | NE | Noble Corporation | OMI | Owens & Minor | NE replaced OMI as it was no longer representative of the small-cap market space. | |
| September 22, 2025 | MAN | ManpowerGroup | MLAB | Mesa Laboratories | MAN was moved from the S&P 400 as it was more representative of the small cap market space. MLAB was removed from the S&P 600 as it was no longer representative of the small-cap market space. | |
| September 22, 2025 | ACHC | Acadia Healthcare | TTGT | Techtarget | ACHC was moved from the S&P 400 as it was more representative of the small cap market space. TTGT was removed from the S&P 600 as it was no longer representative of the small-cap market space. | |
| September 22, 2025 | WEN | The Wendy's Company | XRX | Xerox | WEN was moved from the S&P 400 as it was more representative of the small cap market space. XRX was removed from the S&P 600 as it was no longer representative of the small-cap market space. | |
| September 22, 2025 | ENPH | Enphase Energy | PUMP | ProPetro Holding | ENPH was moved from the S&P 500 as it was more representative of the small cap market space. PUMP was removed from the S&P 600 as it was no longer representative of the small-cap market space. | |
| September 22, 2025 | CZR | Caesars Entertainment | KTOS | Kratos Defense & Security Solutions | CZR was moved from the S&P 500 as it was more representative of the small cap market space. KTOS was moved to the S&P 400 as it was more representative of the mid-cap market space. | |
| September 22, 2025 | MKTX | MarketAxess | MP | MP Materials | MKTX was moved from the S&P 500 as it was more representative of the small cap market space. MP was moved to the S&P 400 as it was more representative of the mid-cap market space. | |
| September 9, 2025 | MIR | Mirion Technologies | GMS | GMS, Inc. | MIR replaced GMS after it was acquired by Home Depot. | |
| September 8, 2025 | PRKS | United Parks & Resorts | FL | Foot Locker | PRKS replaced FL after it was acquired by Dick's Sporting Goods. | |
| September 2, 2025 | ADAM | Adamas Trust, Inc. | NYMT | New York Mortgage Trust, Inc. | NYMT now trades under symbol ADAM after corporate rebrand. | |
| September 2, 2025 | BHLB | Berkshire Hills Bancorp | BBT | Beacon Financial Corp. | BHLB acquired Brookline Bancorp. Post merger, BHLB remained in the S&P 600 with a name change to Beacon Financial Corp and ticker change to BBT. | |
| September 2, 2025 | SRPT | Sarepta Therapeutics | BRKL | Brookline Bancorp | BRKL was acquired by Berkshire Hills Bancorp. SRPT was moved from the S&P 400 to replace it as it was more representative of the small cap market space. | |
| September 2, 2025 | KNTK | Kinetik Holdings | PPBI | Pacific Premier Bancorp | KNTK replaced PPBI after it was acquired by Columbia Banking System, Inc. | |
| August 6, 2025 | KGS | Kodiak Gas Services | NVEE | NV5 Global | KGS replaced NVEE after it was acquired by Acuren Corporation. | |
| July 29, 2025 | VCYT | Veracyte | TGI | Triumph Group | VCYT replaced TGI after it was acquired by Warburg Pincus and Berkshire Partners. | |
| July 18, 2025 | VCTR | Victory Capital | AVAV | AeroVironment | VCTR replaced AVAV, which replaced ChampionX in the S&P 400 after it was acquired by Schlumberger. | |
| July 1, 2025 | RAL | Ralliant Corp | WOLF | Wolfspeed | RAL replaced WOLF after it announced its intention to file for bankruptcy and was therefore no longer eligible for continued inclusion in the S&P 600. Fortive completed the corporate spin-off of Ralliant, which remained in the S&P 500. | |
| June 6, 2025 | HTO | H2O America | SJW | San Jose Water Group | San Jose Water Group (SJW) rebranded as H2O America (HTO). | |
| April 17, 2025 | STRL | Sterling Infrastructure | PDCO | Patterson Companies | STRL replaced PDCO after it was acquired by Patient Square Capital. | |
| April 16, 2025 | ACT | Enact Holdings | SWI | SolarWinds | ACT replaced SWI after it was acquired by Turn/River Capital. | |
| April 2, 2025 | ANGI | Angi Inc. | ODP | The ODP Corporation | IAC Inc. completed the corporate spin-off of Angi, which replaced ODP which was no longer representative of the small-cap market space. | |
| March 24, 2025 | TFX | Teleflex | VFC | VF Corporation | TFX was moved from the S&P 500 as it was more representative of the small cap market space. VFC was moved to the S&P 400 as it was more representative of the mid-cap market space. | |
| March 24, 2025 | CE | Celanese | ALK | Alaska Air Group | CE was moved from the S&P 500 as it was more representative of the small cap market space. ALK was moved to the S&P 400 as it was more representative of the mid-cap market space. | |
| March 24, 2025 | FMC | FMC Corporation | HIMS | Hims & Hers Health | FMC was moved from the S&P 500 as it was more representative of the small cap market space. HIMS was moved to the S&P 400 as it was more representative of the mid-cap market space. | |
| March 24, 2025 | BWA | BorgWarner | AMBC | Ambac Financial Group | BWA was moved from the S&P 500 as it was more representative of the small cap market space. AMBC was removed from the S&P 600 as it was no longer representative of the small-cap market space. | |
| March 24, 2025 | CC | Chemours | BBWI | Bath & Body Works, Inc. | CC was moved from the S&P 400 as it was more representative of the small cap market space. BBWI was moved to the S&P 400 as it was more representative of the mid-cap market space. | |
| March 24, 2025 | TDC | Teradata | ATI | ATI Inc. | TDC was moved from the S&P 400 as it was more representative of the small cap market space. ATI was moved to the S&P 400 as it was more representative of the mid-cap market space. | |
| March 24, 2025 | NEOG | Neogen | SATS | EchoStar | NEOG was moved from the S&P 400 as it was more representative of the small cap market space. SATS was moved to the S&P 400 as it was more representative of the mid-cap market space. | |
| March 24, 2025 | RHP | Ryman Hospitality Properties | WNC | Wabash National | RHP replaced WNC as it was no longer representative of the small-cap market space. | |
| March 24, 2025 | ESI | Element Solutions | GDOT | Green Dot Corporation | ESI replaced GDOT as it was no longer representative of the small-cap market space. | |
| March 24, 2025 | FRPT | Freshpet | FLGT | Fulgent Genetics | FRPT replaced FLGT as it was no longer representative of the small-cap market space. | |
| March 24, 2025 | WSC | WillScot Holdings Corp. | NBR | Nabors Industries | WSC replaced NBR as it was no longer representative of the small-cap market space. | |
| March 24, 2025 | MWA | Mueller Water Products | GPRE | Green Plains Inc. | MWA replaced GPRE as it was no longer representative of the small-cap market space. | |
| March 24, 2025 | KTOS | Kratos Defense & Security Solutions | MATV | Mativ Holdings | KTOS replaced MATV as it was no longer representative of the small-cap market space. | |
| March 24, 2025 | CLSK | CleanSpark | HAIN | Hain Celestial Group | CLSK replaced HAIN as it was no longer representative of the small-cap market space. | |
| February 25, 2025 | SNDK | SanDisk | LESL | Leslie's | Western Digital completed the corporate spin-off of Sandisk, which replaced LESL which was no longer representative of the small-cap market space. | |
| February 19, 2025 | KAI | Kadant | NARI | Inari Medical | KAI replaced NARI after it was acquired by Stryker Corporation. | |
| February 13, 2025 | GOLF | Acushnet Company | ROIC | Retail Opportunity Investments | GOLF replaced ROIC after it was acquired by Blackstone Inc. | |
| February 10, 2025 | MRP | Millrose Properties | IRWD | Ironwood Pharmaceuticals | Lennar completed the corporate spin-off of Millrose, which replaced IRWD which was no longer representative of the small-cap market space. | |
| January 27, 2025 | ARWR | Arrowhead Pharmaceuticals | B | Barnes Group | B was acquired by Apollo Global Management. ARWR was moved from the S&P 400 to replace it as it was more representative of the small cap market space. | |
| January 14, 2025 | ENOV | Enovis | ARCH | Arch Resources | ARCH was acquired by Consol Energy. Consol Energy was renamed Core Natural Resources Inc., and its ticker changed to CNR. ENOV was moved from the S&P 400 to replace it as it was more representative of the small cap market space. | |
| January 3, 2025 | JBTM | JBT Marel Corporation | JBT | John Bean Technologies Corporation | John Bean Technologies (JBT) acquired Marel and began trading under new symbol JBTM. | |
| January 3, 2025 | ACAD | Acadia Pharmaceuticals | IBTX | Independent Bank Group | ACAD replaced IBTX after it was acquired by SouthState Bank. | |
| January 2, 2025 | GDYN | Grid Dynamics Holdings | GEAR | Revelyst | GDYN replaced GEAR after it was acquired by Strategic Value Partners. | |
| December 30, 2024 | INSW | International Seaways | CNSL | Consolidated Communications | INSW replaced CNSL after it was acquired by British Columbia Investment Management Corporation and Searchlight Capital. | |
| December 23, 2024 | QRVO | Qorvo | KELYA | Kelly Services | QRVO was moved from the S&P 500 as it was more representative of the small cap market space. KELYA was removed from the S&P 600 as it was no longer representative of the small-cap market space. | |
| December 23, 2024 | AMTM | Amentum | SVC | Service Properties Trust | AMTM was moved from the S&P 500 as it was more representative of the small cap market space. SVC was removed from the S&P 600 as it was no longer representative of the small-cap market space. | |
| December 23, 2024 | VSH | Vishay Intertechnology | CMA | Comerica | VSH was moved from the S&P 400 as it was more representative of the small cap market space. CMA was moved to the S&P 400 as it was more representative of the mid-cap market space. | |
| December 23, 2024 | CRI | Carter's | CRS | Carpenter Technology | CRI was moved from the S&P 400 as it was more representative of the small cap market space. CRS was moved to the S&P 400 as it was more representative of the mid-cap market space. | |
| December 23, 2024 | TRNO | Terreno Realty | HPP | Hudson Pacific Properties | TRNO replaced HPP as it was no longer representative of the small-cap market space. | |
| December 23, 2024 | SKY | Champion Homes | RGNX | REGENXBIO | SKY replaced RGNX as it was no longer representative of the small-cap market space. | |
| November 27, 2024 | CON | Concentra Group Holdings | MYE | Myers Industries | CON replaced MYE as it was no longer representative of the small-cap market space. | |
| November 26, 2024 | AESI | Atlas Energy Solutions | MLI | Mueller Industries | AESI replaced MLI, which replaced Texas Pacific Land Corporation in the S&P 400 after it was moved to the S&P 500. | |
| November 25, 2024 | DFH | Dream Finders Homes | HAYN | Haynes International | DFH replaced HAYN after it was acquired by Acerinox. | |
| November 25, 2024 | AZTA | Azenta | ENV | Envestnet | ENV was acquired by Bain Capital. AZTA was moved from the S&P 400 to replace it as it was more representative of the small cap market space. | |
| November 4, 2024 | ECG | Everus Construction Group | CLW | Clearwater Paper Corporation | MDU Resources completed the corporate spin-off of Everus. CLW was no longer representative of the small-cap market space. | |
| October 15, 2024 | PENG | Penguin Solutions, Inc. | SGH | Smart Global Holdings, Inc. | Smart Global Holdings (SGH) rebranded as Penguin Solutions (PENG). | |
| October 11, 2024 | MDU | MDU Resources | CHUY | Chuy's | CHUY was acquired by Darden Restaurants. MDU was moved from the S&P 400 to replace it as it announced its intention to spin-off a company at a later date. | |
| October 9, 2024 | HIMS | Hims & Hers Health | VGR | Vector Group | HIMS replaced VGR after it was acquired by JT Group. | |
| October 4, 2024 | CRGY | Crescent Energy Company | PRFT | Perficient | CRGY replaced PRFT after it was acquired by EQT AB. | |
| October 1, 2024 | CURB | Curbline Properties | CCRN | Cross Country Healthcare | SITE Centers completed the corporate spin-off of Curbline. | |
| October 1, 2024 | TMDX | TransMedics Group | ENSG | Ensign Group | TMDX replaced ENSG, which replaced Southwestern Energy in the S&P 400 after it was acquired by Chesapeake Energy. | |
| October 1, 2024 | BBWI | Bath & Body Works, Inc. | MOV | Movado | BBWI was moved from the S&P 500 as it was more representative of the small cap market space. MOV was removed from the S&P 600 as it was no longer representative of the small-cap market space. | |
| September 23, 2024 | ETSY | Etsy | HVT | Havertys | ETSY was moved from the S&P 500 as it was more representative of the small cap market space. HVT was removed from the S&P 600 as it was no longer representative of the small-cap market space. | |
| September 23, 2024 | TGNA | Tegna Inc. | DBI | Designer Brands | TGNA was moved from the S&P 400 as it was more representative of the small cap market space. DBI was removed from the S&P 600 as it was no longer representative of the small-cap market space. | |
| September 23, 2024 | ZD | Ziff Davis | FN | Fabrinet | ZD was moved from the S&P 400 as it was more representative of the small cap market space. FN was moved to the S&P 400 as it was more representative of the mid-cap market space. | |
| September 23, 2024 | MP | MP Materials | CVGW | Calavo Growers, Inc. | MP was moved from the S&P 400 as it was more representative of the small cap market space. CVGW was removed from the S&P 600 as it was no longer representative of the small-cap market space. | |
| September 23, 2024 | PGNY | Progyny | EHAB | Enhabit | PGNY was moved from the S&P 400 as it was more representative of the small cap market space. EHAB was removed from the S&P 600 as it was no longer representative of the small-cap market space. | |
| September 23, 2024 | ADNT | Adient | MERC | Mercer International | ADNT was moved from the S&P 400 as it was more representative of the small cap market space. MERC was removed from the S&P 600 as it was no longer representative of the small-cap market space. | |
| September 23, 2024 | WOLF | Wolfspeed | CMP | Compass Minerals | WOLF was moved from the S&P 400 as it was more representative of the small cap market space. CMP was removed from the S&P 600 as it was no longer representative of the small-cap market space. | |
| September 23, 2024 | HELE | Helen of Troy Limited | DDD | 3D Systems Corporation | HELE was moved from the S&P 400 as it was more representative of the small cap market space. DDD was removed from the S&P 600 as it was no longer representative of the small-cap market space. | |
| September 23, 2024 | ZWS | Zurn Elkay Water Solutions | CHCT | Community Healthcare Trust | ZWS replaced CHCT as it was no longer representative of the small-cap market space. | |
| September 23, 2024 | YOU | Clear Secure | VREX | Varex Imaging | YOU replaced VREX as it was no longer representative of the small-cap market space. | |
| September 23, 2024 | TGTX | TG Therapeutics | DIN | Dine Brands Global | TGTX replaced DIN as it was no longer representative of the small-cap market space. | |
| September 23, 2024 | INSP | Inspire Medical Systems | NUS | Nu Skin Enterprises | INSP replaced NUS as it was no longer representative of the small-cap market space. | |
| September 23, 2024 | CSW | CSW Industrials | AMCX | AMC Networks | CSW replaced AMCX as it was no longer representative of the small-cap market space. | |
| September 23, 2024 | ADMA | ADMA Biologics | ZEUS | Olympic Steel | ADMA replaced ZEUS as it was no longer representative of the small-cap market space. | |
| September 23, 2024 | PI | Impinj | RILY | B. Riley Financial | PI replaced RILY as it was no longer representative of the small-cap market space. | |
| September 6, 2024 | INVX | Innovex International, Inc. | DRQ | Dril-Quip, Inc. | Dril-Quip (DRQ) merged with Innovex and began trading under symbol INVX. | |
| August 9, 2024 | SWI | SolarWinds | SPWR | SunPower | SWI replaced SPWR after it filed for Chapter 11 bankruptcy and is no longer eligible for continued inclusion in the S&P 600. | |
| July 31, 2024 | SNDR | Schneider National | SLCA | U.S. Silica Holdings | SNDR replaced SLCA after it was acquired by Apollo Global Management. | |
| July 26, 2024 | QDEL | QuidelOrtho | HIBB | Hibbett Sports | HIBB was acquired by JD Sports. QDEL was moved from the S&P 400 to replace it as it was more representative of the small cap market space. | |
| July 22, 2024 | GTES | Gates Corporation | ANF | Abercrombie & Fitch Company | GTES replaced ANF, which replaced Equitrans Midstream in the S&P 400 after it was acquired by EQT Corporation. | |
| July 3, 2024 | PTGX | Protagonist Therapeutics | WIRE | Encore Wire Corporation | PTGX replaced WIRE after it was acquired by Prysmian Group. | |
| June 24, 2024 | CMA | Comerica | ADTN | ADTRAN | CMA was moved from the S&P 500 as it was more representative of the small cap market space. ADTN was removed from the S&P 600 as it was no longer representative of the small-cap market space. | |
| June 24, 2024 | RHI | Robert Half | HOUS | Anywhere Real Estate | RHI was moved from the S&P 500 as it was more representative of the small cap market space. HOUS was removed from the S&P 600 as it was no longer representative of the small-cap market space. | |
| June 24, 2024 | LEG | Leggett & Platt | MEI | Methode Electronics | LEG was moved from the S&P 400 as it was more representative of the small cap market space. MEI was removed from the S&P 600 as it was no longer representative of the small-cap market space. | |
| June 24, 2024 | HTZ | Hertz | CLDT | Chatham Lodging Trust | HTZ was moved from the S&P 400 as it was more representative of the small cap market space. CLDT was removed from the S&P 600 as it was no longer representative of the small-cap market space. | |
| June 24, 2024 | GO | Grocery Outlet | NFBK | Northfield Bancorp, | GO was moved from the S&P 400 as it was more representative of the small cap market space. NFBK was removed from the S&P 600 as it was no longer representative of the small-cap market space. | |
| June 24, 2024 | PENN | Penn Entertainment | XPER | Xperi | PENN was moved from the S&P 400 as it was more representative of the small cap market space. XPER was removed from the S&P 600 as it was no longer representative of the small-cap market space. | |
| June 24, 2024 | IART | Integra Lifesciences | RGP | Resources Connection | IART was moved from the S&P 400 as it was more representative of the small cap market space. RGP was removed from the S&P 600 as it was no longer representative of the small-cap market space. | |
| June 24, 2024 | WERN | Werner Enterprises | ATNI | ATN International | WERN was moved from the S&P 400 as it was more representative of the small cap market space. ATNI was removed from the S&P 600 as it was no longer representative of the small-cap market space. | |
| June 24, 2024 | KRYS | Krystal Biotech | OSUR | OraSure Technologies | KRYS replaced OSUR as it was no longer representative of the small-cap market space. | |
| June 24, 2024 | VIRT | Virtu Financial | MCS | Marcus Corporation | VIRT replaced MCS as it was no longer representative of the small-cap market space. | |
| June 24, 2024 | STEP | StepStone Group | TTEC | TTEC Holdings | STEP replaced TTEC as it was no longer representative of the small-cap market space. | |
| June 24, 2024 | WHD | Cactus | MED | Medifast | WHD replaced MED as it was no longer representative of the small-cap market space. | |
| June 24, 2024 | TDW | Tidewate | CRNC | Cerence | TDW replaced CRNC as it was no longer representative of the small-cap market space. | |
| May 8, 2024 | MARA | Marathon Digital | AAON | AAON | MARA replaced AAON, which replaced Vistra Corp in the S&P 400 after it was moved to the S&P 500. | |
| May 7, 2024 | DOCN | DigitalOcean | AGTI | Agiliti | DOCN replaced AGTI after it was acquired by Thomas H. Lee Partners. | |
| May 6, 2024 | IAC | IAC Inc. | AEL | American Equity Investment Life Holding Co. | IAC replaced AEL after it was acquired by Brookfield Reinsurance. | |
| April 23, 2024 | CNS | Cohen & Steers | KAMN | Kaman Corporation | CNS replaced KAMN after it was acquired by Arcline Investment Management. | |
| April 22, 2024 | CABO | Cable One | MDC | MDC Holdings | MDC was acquired by Sekisui House. CABO was moved from the S&P 400 to replace it as it was more representative of the small cap market space. | |
| April 3, 2024 | VFC | VF Corporation | MODV | ModivCare | VFC was moved from the S&P 500 as it was more representative of the small cap market space. MODV was removed from the S&P 600 as it was no longer representative of the small-cap market space. | |
| April 3, 2024 | FOXF | Fox Factory | SSP | E. W. Scripps Company | FOXF was moved from the S&P 400 as it was more representative of the small cap market space. SSP was removed from the S&P 600 as it was no longer representative of the small-cap market space. | |
| April 1, 2024 | RUN | Sunrun | PGTI | PGT Innovations | PGTI was acquired by MITER Brands. RUN was moved from the S&P 400 to replace it as it was more representative of the small cap market space. | |
| April 1, 2024 | NARI | Inari Medical | CPE | Callon Petroleum | CPE was acquired by APA Corporation. NARI was moved from the S&P 400 to replace it as it was more representative of the small cap market space. | |
| March 18, 2024 | CALX | Calix, Inc. | CYTK | Cytokinetics | CALX was moved from the S&P 400 as it was more representative of the small cap market space. CYTK was moved to the S&P 400 as it was more representative of the mid-cap market space. | |
| March 18, 2024 | MPW | Medical Properties Trust | AIT | Applied Industrial Technologies | MPW was moved from the S&P 400 as it was more representative of the small cap market space. AIT was moved to the S&P 400 as it was more representative of the mid-cap market space. | |
| March 18, 2024 | MGY | Magnolia Oil & Gas | CRMT | Americas Carmart | MGY replaced CRMT as it was no longer representative of the small-cap market space. | |
| March 18, 2024 | AL | Air Lease Corporation | TBI | TrueBlue | AL replaced TBI as it was no longer representative of the small-cap market space. | |
| March 18, 2024 | BOX | Box, Inc. | FORR | Forrester Research | BOX replaced FORR as it was no longer representative of the small-cap market space. | |
| March 18, 2024 | BGC | BGC Group | OIS | Oil States International | BGC replaced OIS as it was no longer representative of the small-cap market space. | |
| March 18, 2024 | BL | BlackLine Systems | APPS | Digital Turbine | BL replaced APPS as it was no longer representative of the small-cap market space. | |
| March 18, 2024 | ARCH | Arch Resources | CCSI | Consensus Cloud Solutions | ARCH replaced CCSI as it was no longer representative of the small-cap market space. | |
| March 18, 2024 | MGEE | MGE Energy | IRBT | iRobot | MGEE replaced IRBT as it was no longer representative of the small-cap market space. | |
| March 4, 2024 | CXM | Sprinklr | MDRX | Veradigm | CXM replaced MDRX after it was suspended from the Nasdaq Stock Market due to non-compliance with listing rules and is no longer eligible for continued inclusion in the S&P 600. | |
| January 23, 2024 | BTU | Peabody Energy | ELF | e.l.f. Beauty, Inc. | BTU replaced ELF, which replaced Spirit Realty Capital in the S&P 400 after it was acquired by Realty Income. | |
| January 5, 2024 | PDCO | Patterson Companies | CHS | Chico's FAS | CHS was acquired by Sycamore Partners. PDCO was moved from the S&P 400 to replace it as it was more representative of the small cap market space. | |
| January 2, 2024 | SATS | EchoStar | DISH | Dish Network | SATS replaced DISH after it acquired the company. | |
| January 2, 2024 | VYX | NCR Voyix | LTHM | Livent Corp. | LTHM was merged with Allkem. | |
| January 2, 2024 | RUSHA | Rush Enterprises | RPT | RPT Realty | RUSHA replaced RPT after it was acquired by Kimco Realty. | |
| December 18, 2023 | SEE | Sealed Air | OFIX | Orthofix Medical | SEE was moved from the S&P 500 as it was more representative of the small cap market space. OFIX was moved to the S&P 400 as it was more representative of the mid-cap market space. | |
| December 18, 2023 | ALSK | Alaska Air Group | RMBS | Rambus | ALSK was moved from the S&P 500 as it was more representative of the small cap market space. RMBS was moved to the S&P 400 as it was more representative of the mid-cap market space. | |
| December 18, 2023 | SEDG | SolarEdge | FIX | Comfort Systems USA | SEDG was moved from the S&P 500 as it was more representative of the small cap market space. FIX was removed from the S&P 600 as it was no longer representative of the small-cap market space. | |
| December 18, 2023 | MODG | Topgolf Callaway Brands | CLFD | Clearfield | MODG was moved from the S&P 400 as it was more representative of the small cap market space. CLFD was removed from the S&P 600 as it was no longer representative of the small-cap market space. | |
| December 18, 2023 | VSTS | Vestis | OSPN | OneSpan | VSTS was moved from the S&P 400 as it was more representative of the small cap market space. OSPN was removed from the S&P 600 as it was no longer representative of the small-cap market space. | |
| December 18, 2023 | ALKS | Alkermes | CYH | Community Health Systems, Inc. | ALKS replaced CYH as it was no longer representative of the small-cap market space. | |
| December 18, 2023 | AWI | Armstrong World Industries | IVR | Invesco Mortgage Capital | AWI replaced IVR as it was no longer representative of the small-cap market space. | |
| December 18, 2023 | NHC | National Healthcare | CDMO | Avid Bioservices | NHC replaced CDMO as it was no longer representative of the small-cap market space. | |
| December 18, 2023 | PJT | PJT Partners | JRVR | James River Group Holdings | PJT replaced JRVR as it was no longer representative of the small-cap market space. | |
| December 4, 2023 | WS | Worthington Steel | SNBR | Sleep Number | Worthington Industries completed the corporate spin-off of Worthington Steel. Post spin-off Worthington Industries was renamed Worthington Enterprises. | |
| November 30, 2023 | CWEN, CWEN.A | Clearway, Inc. | VRTV | Veritiv | CWEN replaced VRTV after it was acquired by Clayton, Dubilier & Rice. | |
| November 30, 2023 | WOR | Worthington Industries | AVTA | Avantax | AVTA was acquired by Aretec Group, Inc. WOR was moved from the S&P 400 to replace it as it was more representative of the small cap market space. | |
| November 30, 2023 | ICUI | ICU Medical | PACW | PacWest Bancorp | PACW was acquired by Banc of California. ICUI was moved from the S&P 400 to replace it as it was more representative of the small cap market space. | |
| November 13, 2023 | ACIW | ACI Worldwide | NXGN | NextGen Healthcare | NXGN was acquired by Thoma Bravo. ACIW was moved from the S&P 400 to replace it as it was more representative of the small cap market space. | |
| November 10, 2023 | AMR | Alpha Metallurgical Resources | AVID | Avid Technology | AMR replaced AVID after it was acquired by Symphony Technology Group. | |
| November 7, 2023 | ENV | Envestnet | TWNK | Hostess Brands | TWNK was acquired by The J.M. Smucker Company. ENV was moved from the S&P 400 to replace it as it was more representative of the small cap market space. | |
| October 20, 2023 | VICR | Vicor Corporation | CIR | CIRCOR International | CIR was acquired by KKR & Co. Inc. VICR was moved from the S&P 400 to replace it as it was more representative of the small cap market space. | |
| October 18, 2023 | OGN | Organon & Co. | ONTO | Onto Innovation | OGN was moved from the S&P 500 as it was more representative of the small cap market space. ONTO was moved to the S&P 400 as it was more representative of the mid-cap market space. | |
| October 18, 2023 | NATL | NCR Atleos | ITOS | iTeos Therapeutics | NCR Corporation competed the corporate spin-off of NCR Atleos. | |
| October 3, 2023 | KLG | WK Kellogg Co | AVD | American Vanguard Corporation | Kellogg's completed the corporate spin-off of WK Kellogg. | |
| October 3, 2023 | KSS | Kohl's | HA | Hawaiian Holdings | KSS was moved from the S&P 400 as it was more representative of the small cap market space. HA was removed from the S&P 600 as it was no longer representative of the small-cap market space. | |
| October 3, 2023 | DXC | DXC Technology | EBIX | Ebix | DXC was moved from the S&P 500 as it was more representative of the small cap market space. EBIX was removed from the S&P 600 as it was no longer representative of the small-cap market space. | |
| September 29, 2023 | HAYW | Hayward Holdings | CIVI | Civitas Resources | HAYW replaced CIVI which replaced Syneos Health in the S&P 400. | |
| September 18, 2023 | APLE | Apple Hospitality REIT | CPSI | Computer Programs and Systems | Market capitalization changes. | |
| September 18, 2023 | LBRT | Liberty Energy | ZYXI | Zynex | Market capitalization changes. | |
| September 18, 2023 | BXMT | Blackstone Mortgage Trust | RMAX | RE/MAX | Market capitalization changes. | |
| September 18, 2023 | HASI | Hannon Armstrong | FF | FutureFuel | Market capitalization changes. | |
| September 18, 2023 | JBLU | JetBlue | ONL | Orion Office REIT | Market capitalization changes. | |
| September 18, 2023 | TRIP | TripAdvisor | VNDA | Vanda Pharmaceuticals | Market capitalization changes. | |
| September 18, 2023 | HIW | Highwoods Properties | ANGO | AngioDynamics | Market capitalization changes. | |
| September 18, 2023 | XRX | Xerox | OPI | Office Properties Income Trust | Market capitalization changes. | |
| September 18, 2023 | ENR | Energizer | EGHT | 8x8 | Market capitalization changes. | |
| September 18, 2023 | CATY | Cathay Bank | CHRS | Coherus Biosciences | Market capitalization changes. | |
| September 18, 2023 | SXT | Sensient Technologies | NTGR | Netgear | Market capitalization changes. | |
| September 18, 2023 | PZZA | Papa John's | AAN | Aaron's, Inc. | Market capitalization changes. | |
| September 18, 2023 | OMCL | Omnicell | TSE | Trinseo | Market capitalization changes. | |
| September 18, 2023 | NWL | Newell Brands | UVE | Universal Insurance Holdings | Market capitalization changes. | |
| September 18, 2023 | LNC | Lincoln National | QURE | UniQure | Market capitalization changes. | |
| September 1, 2023 | JXN | Jackson Financial | NEX | NexTier Oilfield Solutions | JXN replaced NEX after it was acquired by Patterson-UTI. | |
| September 1, 2023 | GSHD | Goosehead Insurance | NUVA | NuVasive | GSHD replaced NUVA after it was acquired by Globus Medical. | |
| August 25, 2023 | AAP | Advance Auto Parts | EBS | Emergent BioSolutions | AAP was moved from the S&P 500 as it was more representative of the small cap market space. EBS was removed from the S&P 600 as it was no longer representative of the small-cap market space. | |
| August 22, 2023 | STAA | Staar Surgical | UBA | Urstadt Biddle Properties | UBA was acquired by Regency Centers. STAA was moved from the S&P 400 to replace it as it was more representative of the small cap market space. | |
| August 21, 2023 | MRCY | Mercury Systems | ARNC | Arconic | ARNC was acquired by Apollo Global Management. MRCY was moved from the S&P 400 to replace it as it was more representative of the small cap market space. | |
| August 1, 2023 | MSGS | Madison Square Garden Sports | AJRD | Aerojet Rocketdyne | MSGS replaced AJRD after it was acquired by L3Harris. | |
| July 3, 2023 | FTRE | Fortrea | SENEA | Seneca Foods | Labcorp completed the corporate spin-off of Fortrea. | |
| July 3, 2023 | PHIN | PHINIA | LOCO | El Pollo Loco | BorgWarner completed the corporate spin-off of PHINIA. | |
| June 23, 2023 | ABR | Arbor Realty Trust | ROCC | Ranger Oil | ABR replaced ROCC after it was acquired by Baytex Energy. | |
| June 19, 2023 | DISH | Dish Network | CUTR | Cutera, Inc. | DISH was moved from the S&P 500 as it was more representative of the small cap market space. CUTR was removed from the S&P 600 as it was no longer representative of the small-cap market space. | |
| June 19, 2023 | NAVI | Navient | ZUMZ | Zumiez | NAVI was moved from the S&P 400 as it was more representative of the small cap market space. ZUMZ was removed from the S&P 600 as it was no longer representative of the small-cap market space. | |
| June 19, 2023 | SITM | SiTime | GCO | Genesco | SITM was moved from the S&P 400 as it was more representative of the small cap market space. GCO was removed from the S&P 600 as it was no longer representative of the small-cap market space. | |
| June 19, 2023 | MAC | Macerich | BOOM | Dynamic Materials Corporation | MAC was moved from the S&P 400 as it was more representative of the small cap market space. BOOM was removed from the S&P 600 as it was no longer representative of the small-cap market space. | |
| June 19, 2023 | VSCO | Victoria's Secret | GCI | Gannett | VSCO was moved from the S&P 400 as it was more representative of the small cap market space. GCI was removed from the S&P 600 as it was no longer representative of the small-cap market space. | |
| June 19, 2023 | DEI | Douglas Emmett | LPSN | LivePerson | DEI was moved from the S&P 400 as it was more representative of the small cap market space. LPSN was removed from the S&P 600 as it was no longer representative of the small-cap market space. | |
| June 19, 2023 | FULT | Fulton Financial Corporation | RYAM | Rayonier Advanced Materials | FULT was moved from the S&P 400 as it was more representative of the small cap market space. RYAM was removed from the S&P 600 as it was no longer representative of the small-cap market space. | |
| June 19, 2023 | NGVT | Ingevity Corp. | PLCE | The Children's Place | NGVT was moved from the S&P 400 as it was more representative of the small cap market space. PLCE was removed from the S&P 600 as it was no longer representative of the small-cap market space. | |
| June 19, 2023 | SPWR | SunPower | EGRX | Eagle Pharmaceuticals, Inc. | SPWR was moved from the S&P 400 as it was more representative of the small cap market space. EGRX was removed from the S&P 600 as it was no longer representative of the small-cap market space. | |
| June 19, 2023 | WLY | John Wiley & Sons | CMTL | Comtech Telecommunications Corp. | WLY was moved from the S&P 400 as it was more representative of the small cap market space. CMTL was removed from the S&P 600 as it was no longer representative of the small-cap market space. | |
| June 19, 2023 | DAN | Dana Incorporated | PETS | PetMed Express | DAN was moved from the S&P 400 as it was more representative of the small cap market space. PETS was removed from the S&P 600 as it was no longer representative of the small-cap market space. | |
| June 19, 2023 | UFPT | UFP Technologies | BIG | Big Lots | BIG was removed from the S&P 600 and replaced with UFPT as it was no longer representative of the small-cap market space. | |
| June 19, 2023 | SDGR | Schrödinger, Inc. | CARA | Cara Therapeutics | CARA was removed from the S&P 600 and replaced with SDGR as it was no longer representative of the small-cap market space. | |
| June 19, 2023 | PECO | Phillips Edison & Company | FARO | FARO Technologies | FARO was removed from the S&P 600 and replaced with PECO as it was no longer representative of the small-cap market space. | |
| June 19, 2023 | MC | Moelis & Company | DOUG | Douglas Elliman | DOUG was removed from the S&P 600 and replaced with MC as it was no longer representative of the small-cap market space. | |
| June 19, 2023 | CARG | CarGurus | INGN | Inogen | INGN was removed from the S&P 600 and replaced with CARG as it was no longer representative of the small-cap market space. | |
| June 19, 2023 | CRC | California Resources Corporation | TG | Tredegar Corporation | TG was removed from the S&P 600 and replaced with CRC as it was no longer representative of the small-cap market space. | |
| June 19, 2023 | APAM | Artisan Partners Asset Management | TREE | LendingTree | TREE was removed from the S&P 600 and replaced with APAM as it was no longer representative of the small-cap market space. | |
| June 14, 2023 | EXPI | eXp World Holdings | HSKA | Heska Corporation | EXPI replaced HSKA after it was acquired by Mars, Incorporated. | |
| June 14, 2023 | PRVA | Privia Health Group | RUTH | Ruth's Hospitality Group | PRVA replaced RUTH after it was acquired by Darden Restaurants. | |
| June 1, 2023 | BOH | Bank of Hawaii | HMST | HomeStreet Bank | BOH was moved from the S&P 400 as it was more representative of the small cap market space. HMST was removed from the S&P 600 as it was no longer representative of the small-cap market space. | |
| May 1, 2023 | CTKB | Cytek Biosciences | CSII | Cardiovascular Systems | CTKB replaced CSII after it was acquired by Abbott Laboratories. | |
| April 5, 2023 | PACW | PacWest Bancorp | NKTR | Nektar Therapeutics | PACW was moved from the S&P 400 as it was more representative of the small cap market space. NKTR was removed from the S&P 600 as it was no longer representative of the small-cap market space. | |
| April 3, 2023 | NABL | N-able | STAR | iStar | NABL replaced STAR after it was acquired by Safehold, Inc. | |
| March 22, 2023 | CERT | Certara | EXPO | Exponent | CERT replaced EXPO which replaced IAA, Inc. in the S&P 400 after it was acquired by Ritchie Bros. Auctioneers. | |
| March 21, 2023 | CVI | CVR Energy | AAWW | Atlas Air Worldwide Holdings | CVI replaced AAWW after it was acquired by Apollo Global Management. | |
| March 20, 2023 | LUMN | Lumen Technologies | BBBY | Bed Bath & Beyond | LUMN was moved from the S&P 500 as it was more representative of the small cap market space. BBBY was removed from the S&P 600 as it was no longer representative of the small-cap market space. | |
| March 20, 2023 | TNDM | Tandem Diabetes Care | ZIMV | ZimVie | TNDM was moved from the S&P 400 as it was more representative of the small cap market space. ZIMV was removed from the S&P 600 as it was no longer representative of the small-cap market space. | |
| March 20, 2023 | HBI | Hanesbrands | OPRX | OptimizeRx | HBI was moved from the S&P 400 as it was more representative of the small cap market space. OPRX was removed from the S&P 600 as it was no longer representative of the small-cap market space. | |
| March 20, 2023 | PEB | Pebblebrook Hotel Trust | ILPT | Industrial Logistics Properties Trust | PEB was moved from the S&P 400 as it was more representative of the small cap market space. ILPT was removed from the S&P 600 as it was no longer representative of the small-cap market space. | |
| March 20, 2023 | JBGS | JBG Smith | GPMT | Granite Point Mortgage Trust | JBGS was moved from the S&P 400 as it was more representative of the small cap market space. GPMT was removed from the S&P 600 as it was no longer representative of the small-cap market space. | |
| March 20, 2023 | KMT | Kennametal | PKE | Park Aerospace Corp | KMT was moved from the S&P 400 as it was more representative of the small cap market space. PKE was removed from the S&P 600 as it was no longer representative of the small-cap market space. | |
| March 20, 2023 | DY | Dycom Industries | HT | Hersha Hospitality Trust | DY was moved from the S&P 400 as it was more representative of the small cap market space. HT was removed from the S&P 600 as it was no longer representative of the small-cap market space. | |
| March 20, 2023 | WAFD | WaFd, Inc. | SRDX | Surmodics | WAFD was moved from the S&P 400 as it was more representative of the small cap market space. SRDX was removed from the S&P 600 as it was no longer representative of the small-cap market space. | |
| March 20, 2023 | VSAT | Viasat | ORGO | Organogenesis | VSAT was moved from the S&P 400 as it was more representative of the small cap market space. ORGO was removed from the S&P 600 as it was no longer representative of the small-cap market space. | |
| March 20, 2023 | CBRL | Cracker Barrel | UIS | Unisys | CBRL was moved from the S&P 400 as it was more representative of the small cap market space. UIS was removed from the S&P 600 as it was no longer representative of the small-cap market space. | |
| March 20, 2023 | SLG | SL Green Realty | PNTG | Pennant Group | SLG was moved from the S&P 400 as it was more representative of the small cap market space. PNTG was removed from the S&P 600 as it was no longer representative of the small-cap market space. | |
| March 20, 2023 | RDN | Radian Group | UEIC | Universal Electronics Inc | RDN replaced UEIC which was no longer representative of the small-cap market space. | |
| March 20, 2023 | NEX | NexTier Oilfield Solutions | MPAA | Motorcar Parts of America | NEX replaced MPAA which was no longer representative of the small-cap market space. | |
| March 20, 2023 | AUB | Atlantic Union Bank | FSP | Franklin Street Properties Corp. | AUB replaced FSB which was no longer representative of the small-cap market space. | |
| March 20, 2023 | KW | Kennedy Wilson | WW | WW International | KW replaced WW which was no longer representative of the small-cap market space. | |
| March 1, 2023 | VRRM | Verra Mobility | COLB | Columbia Banking System | VRRM replaced COLB which replaced Umpqua Holdings Corporation in the S&P 400. COLB acquired Umpqua Holdings and post-merger, COLB market cap was more representative of the mid-cap market space. | |
| February 23, 2023 | OTTR | Otter Tail Corporation | UFPI | UFP Industries | OTTR replaced UFP which replaced LHC Group, Inc. in the S&P 400 after it was acquired by UnitedHealth Group. | |
| February 6, 2023 | CRK | Comstock Resources | ADC | Agree Realty Corp. | CRK replaced ADC which replaced Store Capital in the S&P 400 after it was acquired by GIC and Oak Street. | |
| February 2, 2023 | NOG | Northern Oil and Gas | SJI | South Jersey Industries | NOG replaced SJI after it was acquired by Infrastructure Investments Fund. | |
| January 31, 2023 | DV | DoubleVerify | VIVO | Meridian Bioscience | DV replaced VIVO after it was acquired by SD Biosensor. | |
| January 5, 2023 | RXO | RXO | JYNT | The Joint Corp. | RXO was moved from the S&P 400 as it was more representative of the small cap market space. JYNT was removed from the S&P 600 as it was no longer representative of the small-cap market space. | |
| December 19, 2022 | MBC | MasterBrand | CONN | Conn's | Fortune Brands Innovations completed the corporate spin-off of MasterBrand. | |
| December 19, 2022 | NUVA | NuVasive | TUP | Tupperware Brands | NUVA was moved from the S&P 400 as it was more representative of the small cap market space. TUP was removed from the S&P 600 as it was no longer representative of the small-cap market space. | |
| December 19, 2022 | SMTC | Semtech | DHC | Diversified Healthcare Trust | SMTC was moved from the S&P 400 as it was more representative of the small cap market space. DHC was removed from the S&P 600 as it was no longer representative of the small-cap market space. | |
| December 19, 2022 | CWK | Cushman & Wakefield | DBD | Diebold Nixdorf | CWK was moved from the S&P 400 as it was more representative of the small cap market space. DBD was removed from the S&P 600 as it was no longer representative of the small-cap market space. | |
| December 19, 2022 | SJW | SJW Group | CATO | Cato Corporation | SJW was moved from the S&P 400 as it was more representative of the small cap market space. CATO was removed from the S&P 600 as it was no longer representative of the small-cap market space. | |
| December 19, 2022 | AGTI | Agiliti | LL | LL Flooring | AGTI was moved from the S&P 400 as it was more representative of the small cap market space. LL was removed from the S&P 600 as it was no longer representative of the small-cap market space. | |
| December 1, 2022 | SABR | Sabre Corporation | FBC | Flagstar Bancorp | FBC was acquired by New York Community Bancorp. SABR was moved from the S&P 400 to replace it as it was more representative of the small cap market space. | |
| December 1, 2022 | NUS | Nu Skin Enterprises | PBF | PBF Energy | NUS was moved from the S&P 400 as it was more representative of the small cap market space. PBF was removed from the S&P 600 as it was no longer representative of the small-cap market space. | |
| November 2, 2022 | BFH | Bread Financial | UFI | Unifi | BFH was moved from the S&P 400 as it was more representative of the small cap market space. UFI was removed from the S&P 600 as it was no longer representative of the small-cap market space. | |
| October 18, 2022 | MLKN | MillerKnoll | CVET | Covetrus | CVET was acquired by Clayton, Dubilier & Rice. MLKN was moved from the S&P 400 to replace it as it was more representative of the small cap market space. | |
| October 12, 2022 | PAYO | Payoneer | LNTH | Lantheus Holdings | PAYO replaced LNTH which replaced Targa Resources in the S&P 400 after it was moved to the S&P 500. | |
| October 3, 2022 | HAIN | Hain Celestial Group | HNGR | Hanger, Inc. | HNGR was acquired by Patient Square Capital, LP. HAIN was moved from the S&P 400 to replace it as it was more representative of the small cap market space. | |
| October 3, 2022 | MCW | Mister Car Wash | EXLS | EXL Service Holdings | MCW replaced EXLS which replaced EQT Corp. in the S&P 400 after it was moved to the S&P 500. | |
| October 3, 2022 | XPER | Xperi | SLQT | SelectQuote | Xperi Holding Corporation completed the corporate spin-off of Xperi Incorporated. Post spin off both companies remained in the S&P 600 but Xperi Holding Corporation was renamed to Adeia Incorporated (Nasdaq: ADEA). SLQT was removed from the S&P 600 as it was no longer representative of the small-cap market space. | |
| October 3, 2022 | STEL | Stellar Bancorp | ABTX | Allegiance Bancshares | ABTX was acquired by CBTX, Inc. and post merger the combined company changed its name and ticker symbol to Stellar Bancorp (Nasdaq: STEL). | |
| September 28, 2022 | LESL | Leslie's | GCP | GCP Applied Technologies | LESL replaced GCP after it was acquired by Compagnie de Saint-Gobain S.A. | |
| September 19, 2022 | HPP | Hudson Pacific Properties | APEI | American Public Education | HPP was moved from the S&P 400 as it was more representative of the small cap market space. APEI was removed from the S&P 600 as it was no longer representative of the small-cap market space. | |
| September 19, 2022 | MCY | Mercury General | EHTH | eHealth | MCY was moved from the S&P 400 as it was more representative of the small cap market space. EHTH was removed from the S&P 600 as it was no longer representative of the small-cap market space. | |
| September 19, 2022 | AEO | American Eagle Outfitters | CAMP | CalAmp | AEO was moved from the S&P 400 as it was more representative of the small cap market space. CAMP was removed from the S&P 600 as it was no longer representative of the small-cap market space. | |
| September 19, 2022 | MTX | Minerals Technology | GLT | Glatfelter | MTX was moved from the S&P 400 as it was more representative of the small cap market space. GLT was removed from the S&P 600 as it was no longer representative of the small-cap market space. | |
| September 19, 2022 | OUT | Outfront Media | FOSL | Fossil Group | OUT was moved from the S&P 400 as it was more representative of the small cap market space. FOSL was removed from the S&P 600 as it was no longer representative of the small-cap market space. | |
| September 15, 2022 | CPRX | Catalyst Pharmaceuticals | MANT | ManTech International | CPRX replaced MANT after it was acquired by The Carlyle Group. | |
| September 1, 2022 | AVID | Avid Technology | POLY | Plantronics | AVID replaced POLY after it was acquired by HP Inc. | |
| August 10, 2022 | CLFD | Clearfield | CELH | Celsius Holdings | CLFD replaced CELH which replaced American Campus Communities in the S&P 400 after it was acquired by Blackstone Inc. | |
| August 4, 2022 | AHCO | AdaptHealth | MTOR | Meritor | AHCO replaced MTOR after it was acquired by Cummins. | |
| July 26, 2022 | SIX | Six Flags | NTUS | Natus Medical | NTUS was acquired by Archimed. SIX was moved from the S&P 400 to replace it as it was more representative of the small cap market space. | |
| July 21, 2022 | SHO | Sunstone Hotel Investors | VG | Vonage | SHO replaced VG after it was acquired by Ericsson. | |
| July 20, 2022 | GRBK | Green Brick Partners | COKE | Coca-Cola Bottling Co. Consolidated | GRBK replaced COKE which replaced PS Business Parks in the S&P 400 after it was acquired by Blackstone Inc. | |
| July 6, 2022 | FTDR | Frontdoor, Inc. | SWN | Southwestern Energy | FTDR replaced SWN which replaced CDK Global in the S&P 400 after it was acquired by Brookfield Business Partners. | |
| July 5, 2022 | LRN | Stride, Inc. | OMCL | Omnicell | LRN replaced OMCL which replaced Coherent, Inc. in the S&P 400 after it was acquired by II-VI Incorporated. | |
| July 5, 2022 | EHAB | Enhabit, Inc. | LYLT | Loyalty Ventures | Encompass Health completed the corporate spin-off of Enhabit. | |
| July 5, 2022 | SNCY | Sun Country Airlines | NP | Neenah, Inc. | SNCY replaced NP after it was acquired by Schweitzer- Mauduit International, Inc. | |
| June 29, 2022 | APPS | Digital Turbine | TVTY | Tivity Health | TVTY was acquired by Stone Point Capital LLC. APPS was moved from the S&P 400 to replace it as it was more representative of the small cap market space. | |
| June 21, 2022 | TRN | Trinity Industries | ENDP | Endo International | TRN was moved from the S&P 400 as it was more representative of the small cap market space. ENDP was removed from the S&P 600 as it was no longer representative of the small-cap market space. | |
| June 21, 2022 | YELP | Yelp | RRGB | Red Robin | YELP was moved from the S&P 400 as it was more representative of the small cap market space. RRGB was removed from the S&P 600 as it was no longer representative of the small-cap market space. | |
| June 21, 2022 | URBN | Urban Outfitters | TCMD | Tactile Systems Technology | URBN was moved from the S&P 400 as it was more representative of the small cap market space. TCMD was removed from the S&P 600 as it was no longer representative of the small-cap market space. | |
| June 21, 2022 | RAMP | LiveRamp | VRA | Vera Bradley | RAMP was moved from the S&P 400 as it was more representative of the small cap market space. VRA was removed from the S&P 600 as it was no longer representative of the small-cap market space. | |
| June 21, 2022 | IRWD | Ironwood Pharmaceuticals | GHL | Greenhill & Co. | IRWD replaced GHL which was no longer representative of the small-cap market space. | |
| June 16, 2022 | EYE | National Vision Holdings | REGI | Renewable Energy Group | EYE replaced REGI after it was acquired by Chevron Corporation. | |
| May 19, 2022 | AOSL | Alpha and Omega Semiconductor | IRT | Independence Realty Trust | AOSL replaced IRT which replaced Mimecast in the S&P 400 after it was acquired by Permira. | |
| May 17, 2022 | DVAX | Dynavax Technologies | EPAY | Bottomline Technologies | DVAX replaced EPAY after it was acquired by Thoma Bravo. | |
| May 3, 2022 | TPH | Tri Pointe Homes | ECOL | US Ecology | ECOL was acquired by Republic Services. TPH was moved from the S&P 400 to replace it as it was more representative of the small cap market space. | |
| April 26, 2022 | ATEN | A10 Networks | FOE | Ferro Corporation | ATEN replaced FOE after it was acquired by Prince International Corp., a portfolio company of American Securities. | |
| April 8, 2022 | GOGO | Gogo, Inc. | FLOW | SPX FLOW, Inc. | GOGO replaced FLOW after it was acquired by Lone Star Funds. | |
| April 7, 2022 | RCUS | Arcus Biosciences | ISBC | Investors Bancorp, Inc. | RCUS replaced ISBC after it was acquired by Citizens Financial Group. | |
| April 6, 2022 | PRG | PROG Holdings | FRGI | Fiesta Restaurant Group | PRG was moved from the S&P 400 to replace FRGI which was no longer representative of the small-cap market space. | |
| April 4, 2022 | VIR | Vir Biotechnology | MTDR | Matador Resources | VIR replaced MTDR which replaced Camden Property Trust in the S&P 400 after it was moved to the S&P 500. | |
| April 4, 2022 | EMBC | Embecta Corp. | BNED | Barnes & Noble Education, Inc. | Becton, Dickinson and Company completed the corporate spin-off of Embecta. | |
| March 30, 2022 | SONO | Sonos | GTLS | Chart Industries | SONO replaced GTLS which replaced CyrusOne in the S&P 400 after it was acquired by Kohlberg Kravis Roberts and Global Infrastructure Partners. | |
| March 16, 2022 | ASO | Academy Sports + Outdoors | KRA | Kraton | ASO replaced KRA after it was acquired by DL Chemical. | |
| March 14, 2022 | CRNC | Cerence | CPS | Cooper-Standard Holdings, Inc. | CRNC was moved from the S&P 400 to replace CPS which was no longer representative of the small-cap market space. | |
| March 2, 2022 | GDEN | Golden Entertainment | RRC | Range Resources | GDEN replaced RRC which replaced Molina Healthcare in the S&P 400 after it was moved to the S&P 500. | |
| March 2, 2022 | ZIMV | ZimVie | TRHC | Tabula Rasa HealthCare | Zimmer Biomet completed the corporate spin-off of ZimVie. | |
| February 18, 2022 | UE | Urban Edge Properties | ONB | Old National Bancorp | UE moved down from the S&P 400 and swapped places with ONB which moved up. ONB acquired First Midwest Bancorp and post-merger, ONB was more representative of the mid-cap market space. UE is more representative of the small-cap market space. | |
| February 18, 2022 | CRSR | Corsair Gaming | FMBI | First Midwest Bancorp | CRSR replaced FMBI after it was acquired by Old National Bancorp. | |
| February 15, 2022 | XPEL | XPEL, Inc. | PDCE | PDC Energy, Inc. | XPEL replaced PDCE which replaced Nordson Corporation in the S&P 400 after it was moved to the S&P 500. | |
| February 3, 2022 | JACK | Jack in the Box | SPPI | Spectrum Pharmaceuticals | JACK was moved from the S&P 400 to replace SPPI which was no longer representative of the small-cap market space. | |
| February 1, 2022 | CMP | Compass Minerals | GWB | Great Western Bancorp, Inc. | GWB was acquired by First Interstate BancSystem. CMP was moved from the S&P 400 to replace it as it was more representative of the small-cap market space. | |
| February 1, 2022 | TWNK | Hostess Brands | WTS | Watts Water Technologies | TWNK replaced WTS which replaced Sterling Bancorp in the S&P 400 after it was acquired by Webster Bank. | |
| January 5, 2022 | ITOS | iTeos Therapeutics | MGLN | Magellan Health | ITOS replaced MGLN after it was acquired by Centene Corporation. | |
| December 30, 2021 | DOUG | Douglas Elliman | MTRX | Matrix Service Company | Vector Group completed the corporate spin-off of Douglas Elliman. Post spin-off, Vector Group remained in the S&P 600. | |
| December 20, 2021 | TR | Tootsie Roll Industries | M | Macy's, Inc. | TR moved down from the S&P 400 and swapped places with M which moved up. | |
| December 20, 2021 | TDS | Telephone and Data Systems | VICR | Vicor Corporation | TDS moved down from the S&P 400 and swapped places with VICR which moved up. | |
| December 20, 2021 | NKTR | Nektar Therapeutics | POWI | Power Integrations | NKTR moved down from the S&P 400 and swapped places with POWI which moved up. | |
| December 2, 2021 | KAR | KAR Auction Services | MDP | Meredith Corporation | MDP was acquired in a two-step transaction by Gray Television and Dotdash. KAR was moved from the S&P 400 to replace it as it was more representative of the small cap market space. | |
| December 2, 2021 | CARS | Cars.com | DSPG | DSP Group | CARS replaced DSPG after it was acquired by Synaptics | |
| December 2, 2021 | NVEE | NV5 Global | RAVN | Raven Industries | NVEE replaced RAVN after it was acquired by CNH Industrial. | |
| November 30, 2021 | EBS | Emergent BioSolutions | UFS | Domtar | UFS was acquired by Paper Excellence. EBS was moved from the S&P 400 to replace it as it was more representative of the small cap market space. | |
| November 24, 2021 | THRY | Thryv | ECHO | Echo Global Logistics | THRY replaced ECHO after it was acquired by The Jordan Company. | |
| November 16, 2021 | ONL | Orion Office REIT | DAKT | Daktronics, Inc. | Realty Income completed the corporate spin-off of Orion Office. | |
| November 9, 2021 | LYLT | Loyalty Ventures | AAOI | Applied Optoelectronics | Alliance Data completed the corporate spin-off of Loyalty Ventures. | |
| November 5, 2021 | NTCT | NetScout Systems | IVC | Invacare Corporation | NTCT moved down from the S&P 400 and replaced IVC which was no longer representative of the small-cap market space. | |
| October 29, 2021 | CDMO | Avid Biosciences | CADE | Cadence Bank | CDMO replaced CADE after it was acquired by BancorpSouth. | |
| October 22, 2021 | HRMY | Harmony Biosciences | RPAI | Retail Properties of America | HRMY replaced RPAI after it was acquired by Kite Realty Group Trust. | |
| October 22, 2021 | TREE | LendingTree | KRG | Kite Realty Group Trust | TREE moved down from the S&P 400 and swapped places with KRG which moved up. TREE has a market capitalization that is more representative of the small-cap market space. | |
| October 19, 2021 | FBRT | Franklin BSP Realty Trust, Inc. | CMO | Capstead Mortgage Corporation | Merger. | |
| October 11, 2021 | CCSI | Consensus Cloud Solutions | RGS | Regis Corporation | J2 Global completed the corporate spin-off of Consensus Cloud. J2 Global changed its name to Ziff Davis | |
| October 4, 2021 | OPRX | OptimizeRx Corp. | LDL | Lydall, Inc. | OPRX replaced LDL after it was acquired by Clearlake Capital. | |
| October 4, 2021 | SLVM | Sylvamo | STMP | Stamps.com | International Paper completed the corporate spin-off of Sylvamo. STMP was acquired by Thoma Bravo. | |
| September 20, 2021 | WW | WW International | TISI | Team, Inc | Market capitalization changes. | |
| September 20, 2021 | HCSG | Healthcare Services Group, Inc. | MSTR | MicroStrategy | HCSG moved down from the S&P 400 and replaced MSTR which was no longer representative of the small-cap market space. | |
| September 20, 2021 | QURE | uniQure N.V. | UIHC | United Insurance Holdings Corp. | QURE replaced UIHC which was no longer representative of the small-cap market space. | |
| September 7, 2021 | LGND | Ligand Pharmaceuticals | CBB | Cincinnati Bell | CBB was acquired by Macquarie Infrastructure and Real Assets. LGND was moved from the S&P 400 to replace it as it was more representative of the small cap market space. | |
| September 3, 2021 | THS | TreeHouse Foods | CORE | Core-Mark Holding Company, Inc. | CORE was acquired by Performance Food Group. THS was moved from the S&P 400 to replace it as it was more representative of the small cap market space. | |
| August 30, 2021 | BLFS | BioLife Solutions | SAIA | Saia | BLFS replaced SAIA which replaced Bio-Techne in the S&P 400 after it was moved to the S&P 500. | |
| August 30, 2021 | CNK | Cinemark Holdings | USCR | U.S. Concrete | USCR was acquired by Vulcan Materials Company. CNK was moved from the S&P 400 to replace it as it was more representative of the small-cap market space. | |
| August 30, 2021 | TRMK | Trustmark Corp. | SYKE | Sykes Enterprises | SYKE was acquired by Sitel. TRMK was moved from the S&P 400 to replace it as it was more representative of the small-cap market space. | |
| August 4, 2021 | LKFN | Lakeland Financial Corp. | GME | GameStop Corp. | LKFN replaced GME which replaced Weingarten Realty in the S&P 400 after it was acquired by Kimco Realty. | |
| August 4, 2021 | INT | World Fuel Services | SPOK | Spok Holdings, Inc. | INT moved down from the S&P 400 and replaced SPOK which was no longer representative of the small-cap market space. | |
| August 3, 2021 | STRA | Strategic Education, Inc. | BELFB | Bel Fuse, Inc. | STRA moved down from the S&P 400 and replaced BELFB which was no longer representative of the small-cap market space. | |
| July 15, 2021 | MSEX | Middlesex Water Company | LMNX | Luminex Corporation | MSEX replaced LMNX after it was acquired by DiaSorin. | |
| July 7, 2021 | ATGE | Adtalem Global Education | BPFH | Boston Private Financial Holdings | ATGE moved down from the S&P 400 and replaced BPFH which was acquired by SVB Financial Group. | |
| June 22, 2021 | TWO | Two Harbors Investment Corp. | CATM | Cardtronics | TWO replaced CATM after it was acquired by NCR Corporation. | |
| June 15, 2021 | AMEH | Apollo Medical Holdings, Inc. | ELY | Callaway Golf Company | AMEH replaced ELY which replaced Grubhub in the S&P 400 after it was acquired by Just Eat Takeaway. | |
| June 10, 2021 | SLQT | SelectQuote, Inc. | CTB | Cooper Tire & Rubber Company | SLQT replaced CTB after it was acquired by Goodyear Tire and Rubber Company. | |
| June 4, 2021 | SVC | Service Properties Trust | LCI | Lannett Company | SVC moved down from the S&P 400 and replaced LCI which was no longer representative of the small-cap market space. | |
| June 2, 2021 | ORGO | Organogenesis Holdings Inc. | CROX | Crocs, Inc. | ORGO replaced CROX which replaced Cantel Medical Corporation in the S&P 400 after it was acquired by Steris. | |
| May 27, 2021 | JYNT | The Joint Corp. | CUB | Cubic Corporation | JYNT replaced CUB after it was acquired by Veritas Capital. | |
| May 17, 2021 | AVNS | Avanos Medical | AEGN | Aegion Corp. | AEGN was acquired by New Mountain Capital. AVNS was moved from the S&P 400 to replace it as it was more representative of the small cap market space. | |
| May 14, 2021 | EFC | Ellington Financial | NSA | National Storage Affiliates Trust | EFC replaced NSA which replaced Charles River Laboratories in the S&P 400 after it was moved to the S&P 500. | |
| May 7, 2021 | TBBK | The Bancorp, Inc. | RCM | R1 RCM | TBBK replaced RCM which replaced Perspecta Inc. in the S&P 400 after it was acquired by Veritas Capital. | |
| May 3, 2021 | GNW | Genworth Financial | GLUU | Glu Mobile | GLUU was acquired by Electronic Arts. GNW was moved from the S&P 400 to replace it as it was more representative of the small cap market space. | |
| May 3, 2021 | UTL | Unitil Corporation | WDR | Waddell & Reed | UTL replaced WDR after it was acquired by Macquarie Group. | |
| April 20, 2021 | UFS | Domtar | EGOV | NIC Inc. | EGOV was acquired by Tyler Technologies. UFS was moved from the S&P 400 to replace it as it was more representative of the small cap market space. | |
| April 15, 2021 | RILY | B. Riley Financial | MIK | The Michaels Companies | RILY replaced MIK after it was acquired by Apollo Global Management. | |
| April 12, 2021 | IDCC | InterDigital | CKH | SEACOR Holdings | CKH was acquired by American Industrial Partners. IDCC was moved from the S&P 400 to replace it as it was more representative of the small cap market space. | |
| April 8, 2021 | CARA | Cara Therapeutics | MTSC | MTS Systems Corporation | CARA replaced MTSC after it was acquired by Amphenol. | |
| March 30, 2021 | OI | O-I Glass | HMSY | HMS Holdings | HMSY was acquired by Veritas Capital. OI was moved from the S&P 400 to replace it as it was more representative of the small cap market space. | |
| March 22, 2021 | VCEL | Vericel | QEP | QEP Resources | VCEL replaced QEP after it was acquired by Diamondback Energy. | |
| March 22, 2021 | EPC | Edgewell Personal Care | EXTN | Exterran Corporation | EPC moved down from the S&P 400 and replaced EXTN which was no longer representative of the small-cap market space. | |
| March 1, 2021 | WSFS | WSFS Financial | CLF | Cleveland-Cliffs | WSFS replaced CLF which replaced Eaton Vance in the S&P 400 after it was acquired by Morgan Stanley. | |
| February 16, 2021 | HNI | HNI Corporation | VRTU | Virtusa Corporation | VRTU was acquired by Baring Private Equity Asia. HNI was moved from the S&P 400 to replace it as it was more representative of the small cap market space. | |
| February 12, 2021 | COLL | Collegium Pharmaceutical | IRDM | Iridium Communications | COLL replaced IRDM which replaced Monolithic Power Systems in the S&P 400 after it was moved to the S&P 500. | |
| February 10, 2021 | ISBC | Investors Bancorp, Inc. | BEAT | BioTelemetry, Inc. | ISBC replaced BEAT after it was acquired by multinational comglomerate Koninklijke Philips N.V. | |
| January 29, 2021 | PBH | Prestige Consumer Healthcare | FBM | Foundation Building Materials, Inc. | FBM was acquired by American Securities. PBH was moved from the S&P 400 to replace it as it was more representative of the small cap market space. | |
| January 21, 2021 | HTH | Hilltop Holdings Inc. | YETI | Yeti Holdings | HTH replaced YETI which replaced Trimble Inc. in the S&P 400 after it was moved to the S&P 500. | |
| January 7, 2021 | CELH | Celsius Holdings | CPRI | Capri Holdings | CELH replaced CPRI which replaced Enphase Energy in the S&P 400 after it was moved to the S&P 500. | |
| January 7, 2021 | ELF | e.l.f. Beauty, Inc. | BRKS | Brooks Automation | ELF replaced BRKS which replaced WPX Energy in the S&P 400 after it was acquired by Devon Energy. | |
| December 29, 2020 | SMPL | The Simply Good Foods Co. | KNSL | Kinsale Capital Group | SMPL replaced KNSL which replaced Taubman Centers in the S&P 400 after it was acquired by Simon Property Group. | |
| December 2, 2020 | AMCX | AMC Networks | RRD | R.R. Donnelley & Sons | AMCX moved down from the S&P 400 and replaced RRD which was no longer representative of the small-cap market space. | |
| December 2, 2020 | AAN | Aaron's, Inc. | GEOS | Geospace Technologies | Aaron's Holding Company, Inc. completed the corporate spin-off of Aaron’s. | |
| November 13, 2020 | FBNC | First Bancorp | AMAG | AMAG Pharmaceuticals | FBNC replaced AMAG after it was acquired by Covis Group. | |
| November 13, 2020 | GEO | GEO Group | GPOR | Gulfport Energy | GEO moved down from the S&P 400 and replaced GPOR which was no longer representative of the small-cap market space. | |
| November 13, 2020 | MD | Mednax | WPG | Washington Prime Group | MD moved down from the S&P 400 and replaced WPG which was no longer representative of the small-cap market space. | |
| October 7, 2020 | CFFN | Capitol Federal Savings Bank | NEOG | Neogen | CFFN replaced NEOG which replaced Pool Corp. in the S&P 400 after it was moved to the S&P 500. | |
| October 7, 2020 | AGO | Assured Guaranty | SSD | Simpson Manufacturing Company | AGO replaced SSD which replaced Delphi Technologies in the S&P 400 after it was acquired by BorgWarner. | |
| October 7, 2020 | RNST | Renasant Corp. | NR | Newpark Resources | RNST replaced NR which was no longer representative of the small-cap market space. | |
| October 5, 2020 | SBH | Sally Beauty Holdings | OAS | Oasis Petroleum | SBH moved down from the S&P 400 and replaced OAS which was no longer representative of the small-cap market space. | |
| October 1, 2020 | CPK | Chesapeake Utilities | MNTA | Momenta Pharmaceuticals | CPK replaced MNTA after it was acquired by Johnson & Johnson. | |
| September 25, 2020 | FLGT | Fulgent Genetics | GTX | Garrett Motion | FLGT replaced GTX which was no longer representative of the small-cap market space. | |
| September 21, 2020 | PBF | PBF Energy | WING | Wingstop | WING was moved from the S&P 600 to the S&P 400 replacing PBF which was moved from the S&P 400 to the S&P 600 based on market cap changes. | |
| September 21, 2020 | ATI | Allegheny Technologies | MEDP | Medpace | MEDP was moved from the S&P 600 to the S&P 400 replacing ATI which was moved from the S&P 400 to the S&P 600 based on market cap changes. | |
| September 21, 2020 | CLI | Mack-Cali Realty Corp. | FOXF | Fox Factory Holding Corp. | FOXF was moved from the S&P 600 to the S&P 400 replacing CLI which was moved from the S&P 400 to the S&P 600 based on market cap changes. | |
| September 21, 2020 | COOP | Mr. Cooper | EXPR | Express, Inc. | COOP replaced EXPR which was no longer representative of the small-cap market space. | |
| September 21, 2020 | RCM | R1 RCM | PEI | PREIT | RCM replaced PEI which was no longer representative of the small-cap market space. | |
| September 1, 2020 | BKU | BankUnited | LAD | Lithia Motors | BKU replaced LAD which replaced LogMeIn in the S&P 400 after it was acquired by Francisco Partners and Elliott Management Corporation. | |
| September 1, 2020 | TRUP | Trupanion | REI | Ring Energy | TRUP replaced REI which was no longer representative of the small-cap market space. | |
| August 17, 2020 | FBK | FB Financial | FSB | Franklin Financial Network | FBK replaced FSB as Franklin Financial Network was acquired by FB Financial | |
| August 17, 2020 | CXW | CoreCivic | VAL | Valaris | CXW replaced VAL which was no longer representative of the small-cap market space. | |
| August 3, 2020 | BANF | BancFirst | RUN | Sunrun | BANF replaced RUN which was no longer representative of the small-cap market space. | |
| August 3, 2020 | DLX | Deluxe Corporation | EE | El Paso Electric | DLX replaced EE as El Paso Electric was acquired. | |
| August 3, 2020 | CRS | Carpenter Technology | CDR | Cedar Realty Trust | CRS replaced CDR which was no longer representative of the small-cap market space. | |
| July 24, 2020 | FHB | First Hawaiian Bank | EBS | Emergent BioSolutions | FHB replaced EBS which was no longer representative of the small-cap market space. | |
| June 30, 2020 | RPAI | Retail Properties of America Inc. | BLD | TopBuild | RPAI replaced BLD which was no longer representative of the small-cap market space. | |
| June 30, 2020 | BDN | Brandywine Realty Trust | BGG | Briggs & Stratton | BDN replaced BGG which was no longer representative of the small-cap market space. | |
| June 25, 2020 | EAT | Brinker International | AXE | Anixter | EAT replaced AXE as Anixter International was acquired by WESCO International. | |
| June 22, 2020 | DNOW | NOW Inc. | TLRD | Tailored Brands | DNOW replaced TLRD which was no longer representative of the small-cap market space. | |
| June 22, 2020 | CAKE | Cheesecake Factory | CBL | CBL & Associates Properties | CAKE replaced CBL which was no longer representative of the small-cap market space. | |
| June 22, 2020 | REZI | Resideo Technologies | HPR | HighPoint Resources | REZI replaced HPR which was no longer representative of the small-cap market space. | |
| June 22, 2020 | BSIG | BrightSphere Investment Group | TTI | TETRA Technologies | BSIG replaced TTI which was no longer representative of the small-cap market space. | |
| June 22, 2020 | BBBY | Bed Bath & Beyond | STRA | Strategic Education, Inc. | BBBY replaced STRA which was no longer representative of the small-cap market space. | |
| June 22, 2020 | MTDR | Matador Resources | QLYS | Qualys | MTDR replaced QLYS which was no longer representative of the small-cap market space. | |
| June 22, 2020 | MDRX | Allscripts Healthcare Solutions | GBCI | Glacier Bancorp | MDRX replaced GBCI which was no longer representative of the small-cap market space. | |
| June 1, 2020 | DHC | Diversified Healthcare Trust | FG | FGL Holdings | DHC replaced FG as FGL Holdings was acquired by Fidelity National Financial. | |
| June 1, 2020 | SLP | Simulations Plus | TIVO | TiVo Inc. | SLP replaced TIVO as TiVo Inc. was acquired by Xperi. | |
| June 1, 2020 | PLMR | Palomar Holdings | LXU | LSB Industries | PLMR replaced LXU which was no longer representative of the small-cap market space. | |
| June 1, 2020 | CHRS | Coherus Biosciences | OPB | Opus Bank | CHRS replaced OPB as Opus Bank was acquired by Pacific Premier Bancorp. | |
| June 1, 2020 | PTEN | Patterson-UTI Energy | NE | Noble Corporation | PTEN replaced NE which was no longer representative of the small-cap market space. | |
| May 22, 2020 | HP | Helmerich & Payne | JCP | JCPenney | HP replaced JCP which filed for Chapter 11 bankruptcy. | |
| May 12, 2020 | CPRI | Capri Holdings | ACOR | Acorda Therapeutics | CPRI replaced ACOR which was no longer representative of the small-cap market space. | |
| May 1, 2020 | CLB | Core Laboratories | AKRX | Akorn | CLB replaced AKRX which filed for Chapter 11 bankruptcy. | |
| May 1, 2020 | MDP | Meredith Corporation | DO | Diamond Offshore Drilling | MDP replaced DO which filed for Chapter 11 bankruptcy. | |
| April 17, 2020 | YETI | YETI Holdings | LHCG | LHC Group | YETI replaced LHCG which was no longer representative of the small-cap market space. | |
| February 13, 2020 | ALEX | Alexander & Baldwin | DPLO | Diplomat Pharmacy | ALEX replaced DPLO as Diplomat Pharmacy was acquired by UnitedHealth Group. | |
| February 13, 2020 | CRMT | America's Car-Mart | CRCM | Care.com | CRMT replaced CRCM as Care.com was acquired by IAC. | |
| February 6, 2020 | GDOT | Green Dot Corporation | WLH | William Lyon Homes | GDOT replaced WLH as William Lyon Homes was acquired by Taylor Morrison. | |
| February 4, 2020 | RUN | Sunrun | DAR | Darling Ingredients | RUN replaced DAR which was no longer representative of the small-cap market space. | |
| January 27, 2020 | SKT | Tanger Factory Outlet Centers | MDR | McDermott International | SKT replaced MDR which filed for Chapter 11 bankruptcy. | |
| January 2, 2020 | FBM | Foundation Building Materials | RH | RH | FBM replaced RH which was no longer representative of the small-cap market space. | |
| December 23, 2019 | UNIT | Uniti Group | CRZO | Carrizo Oil & Gas | UNIT replaced CRZO as Carrizo Oil & Gas was acquired by Callon Petroleum Company. | |
| December 23, 2019 | OAS | Oasis Petroleum | UNIT | Unit Corp | OAS replaced UNIT which was no longer representative of the small-cap market space. | |
| December 23, 2019 | SWN | Southwestern Energy | FTR | Frontier Communications | SWN replaced FTR which was no longer representative of the small-cap market space. | |
| December 17, 2019 | PLT | Plantronics | VSI | Vitamin Shoppe | PLT replaced VSI as Vitamin Shoppe was acquired by Franchise Group. | |

== See also ==
- List of S&P 600 companies
