= RDN =

RDN may refer to:

- Radian Group (NYSE stock symbol), an American mortgage insurance company
- Radiodialnet (RDN.pe), communications and psychology department radio station for the University of San Martín de Porres
- Redang Airport (IATA airport code), Malaysia
- Reddish North railway station (National Rail station code), England
- Regional District of Nanaimo, on Vancouver Island, British Columbia, Canada
- Registered Dental Nurse
- Registered Dietitian Nutritionist, a qualified dietician
- Relative Distinguished Name, an identifier type in the LDAP internet protocol
- Robert De Niro
- Royal Danish Navy

== See also ==
- Reverse domain name notation
