= NSSC =

NSSC may refer to:

- NASA Standard Spacecraft Computer-I
- Nova Scotia Supreme Court
- U.S. Army Natick Soldier Systems Center
- China's National Space Science Center
- Nuclear Safety and Security Commission
- Nuclear Security Services Corporation
- Napco Security Technologies
