= Wilhelm Eilers =

German orientalist, jurist and politician (1906–1989)

Wilhelm Eilers (27 September 1906 in Leipzig – 3 July 1989 in Würzburg) was a German Iranist.

== Life ==
Eilers studied music and law as well as linguistics and the cuneiform script in Freiburg im Breisgau, Munich and Leipzig, among others. With Hans Heinrich Schaeder. He made the acquaintance of Walther Hinz. In 1931 he received his doctorate in Leipzig on forms of society in ancient Babylonian law. In the same year he became a member of the DMG. In 1936 he completed his habilitation at Schaeder in Leipzig. From 1936 he was a research assistant at the Archaeological Institute of the German Empire (AIDR) in Berlin. In 1937 he traveled to Iran, first in Tehran, then in Isfahan to set up a branch of the AIDR, after Eilers failed to come up with a plan to set up a branch in Baghdad in Iraq due to a lack of financial support from the Führer’s office.

== Book ==
Eilers, Wilhelm (1979). Die Al: Ein persisches Kindbettgespenst (Sitzungsberichte / Bayerische Akademie der Wissenschaften, Philosophisch-historische Klasse). Komm: bei Beck. p. 86. ISBN 376961500X.

== Works ==
- Der alte Name des persischen Neujahrsfestes. 1953
- Deutsch-Persisches Wörterbuch. In mehreren Lieferungen von A bis feucht erschienen zwischen 1959 und 1983.
- Als Herausgeber: Persische Handschriften. Teil 1. 1968.
- Die vergleichend-semasiologische Methode in der Orientalistik. 1974.
- Herausgegeben mit Ulrich Schapka: Westiranische Mundarten aus der Sammlung Wilhelm Eilers. Band 1: Die Mundart von Chunsar. 1976; Band 2: Die Mundart von Gäz. 1979; Band 3: Die Mundart von Sivänd. 1988.
- Sinn und Herkunft der Planetennamen. 1978.
- Geographische Namengebung in und um Iran. Ein Überblick in Beispielen. 1982.
- Der Name Demawend. 1988.
