= Connecticut Water Service =

American regulated water company

Connecticut Water Service, Inc.
- Traded as: Nasdaq: CTWS; Russell 2000 Index component
- Industry: Water utilities
- Founded: February 1, 1956
- Defunct: October 9, 2019
- Fate: Acquired by the SJW Group
- Headquarters: Clinton, Connecticut, United States
- Area served: Connecticut; Maine
- Brands: Connecticut Water; Heritage Village Water; Avon Water; Maine Water

Connecticut Water Service, Inc. was a regulated water company based in Clinton, Connecticut. Connecticut Water served both the states of Connecticut and Maine through various operating names. In October 2019, the company was acquired by the SJW Group.

== Business ==
Connecticut Water owned and operated water, drainage and sewage treatment systems in Connecticut and Maine. In the former, it operated variously as Connecticut Water, Heritage Village Water, and Avon Water. Business conducted in Maine was as Maine Water.

== History ==
Connecticut Water Service had been incorporated on February 1, 1956. It had been traded on NASDAQ under the ticker CTWS.

In October 2018, it was announced that Connecticut Water Service was being acquired by the SJW Group, a water utility company based in San Jose, California, pending federal approval. Eversource Energy, an electric and gas utility serving most of New England (including areas served by Connecticut Water's Connecticut systems), submitted a rival bid, but was turned down by the board of Connecticut Water.

The SJW Group had earlier formed Hydro Sub, Inc. to conduct the acquisition. It was dissolved on 9 October 2019 following the completion of the merger.
