= UFP Technologies =

American health care product manufacturer

UFP Technologies, Inc.
- Type: Public
- Traded as: Nasdaq: UFPTRussell 2000 ComponentS&P 600 Component
- Industry: Health Care Products Manufacturing
- Founded: 1963; 63 years ago
- Headquarters: Newburyport, Massachusetts, United States
- Key people: R. Jeffrey Bailly (Chairman, and CEO), Mitchell C. Rock (President); Ronald J. Lataille (SVP, Treasurer and CFO)
- Products: Custom Medical Devices, sterile packaging, sterile drapes, and other highly engineered custom products
- Revenue: $400.1 MM (2023)
- Number of employees: 3293

UFP Technologies, Inc. is an American multinational developer and custom manufacturer of comprehensive solutions for medical devices, sterile packaging, and other highly engineered custom products.

UFP Technologies manufactures a wide range of single-use medical devices, components, and packaging for minimally invasive surgery, infection prevention, wound care, wearables, orthopedic soft goods, and orthopedic implants.

The company also provides highly engineered products and components to customers in the automotive, aerospace and defense, consumer, electronics, and industrial markets.

== History ==
1963-1975

United Packaging Corporation was founded in 1963 by William H. Shaw, Robert W. Drew, and Richard L. Bailly in Woburn, MA as a manufacturer of protective packaging, primarily for electronics. In 1964, the company expanded operations and moved its factory headquarters to Georgetown, Massachusetts. In 1967, the company changed its name to United Foam Plastics Corporation to reflect a broader market capability.

1976-1983

In 1976, with a focus on foam fabrication, the company started precision molding cross-linked polyethylene foam components for the military, consumer, and industrial markets.

1984-1993

In 1988 UFP Technologies introduced compression molded medical protective packaging using specialized foams. On December 17, 1993 the company completed its IPO and formally changed its name to UFP Technologies, Inc. Acquisitions brought new, highly specialized materials including various foams, films, and fabrics used in a range of medical, military, aerospace, consumer, and automotive applications. Additionally, UFP added molded pulp packaging to its portfolio through the acquisition of Moulded Fibre Technology out of Portland, ME.

1994-2003

UFP's growing medical customer base prompted its investment in cleanroom production starting in 1994. In 2001 the company introduced thermoplastic polyurethane (TPU) based pouches and bags as an alternative to foam packaging for the orthopedic implant market. Additional acquisitions expanded its medical foams access and capabilities for a range of applications.

2004-2013

UFP continued to focus on the medical market, accounting for 50% of its $100 million revenue by 2008. Between 2008 and 2013, UFP made five acquisitions to continue its foam offering to medical clients. In 2013 the company introduced a new product line called FlexShield^{®}, a TPU based packaging solution for medical devices, instruments, and orthopedic implants.

2014-2024

In 2016 UFP expanded operations and relocated its headquarters to Newburyport, Massachusetts. In 2022 UFP Technologies sold Molded Fiber Business to CKF, Inc.

In 2022 Sales exceeded $300 million and the firm opened a new medical manufacturing operation in Tijuana, Mexico. In 2023, UFP Technologies was added to the S&P SmallCap 600 index. Additional MedTech acquisitions expanded UFP's international footprint to 5 countries and added complete device manufacturing capabilities. As of 2024, its MedTech business accounted for over 90% of revenue.

== Acquisitions ==
1993 - Moulded Fibre Technology

1997 - FCE Industries

1998 - Pacific Foam Technologies

2000 – Simco Industries

2008 - Stephenson & Lawyer

2009 - Advanced Materials Group

2009 - Foamade Industries Inc.

2009 - E.N. Murray

2013 - Packaging Alternatives Corporation

2018 – Dielectrics

2021 - Contech Medical

2021 – DAS Medical

2022 - Advant Medical

2024 - AJR Enterprises

2024 - AQF Medical

2024 - Marble Medical

2024 - Welch Fluorocarbon

2025 - UNIPEC

2025 - Techno Plastics Industries, Inc. (TPI)

== Awards & Recognition ==
The National Association for Business Resources (NABR):

- "Best and Brightest Companies to Work for In The Nation" (2024, 2023, 2022, 2021, 2020, and 2018)
- "New England's Best & Brightest to Work For" (formerly "Boston's Best & Brightest Companies to Work For") (2024, 2023, 2022, 2021, 2020, and 2018)
- "West Michigan's Best & Brightest Companies to Work For" (2024, 2023, 2022, 2021, 2020, 2019 and 2018)

Diversity Jobs' "Top Diversity Employer (2024)

Forbes

- "Most Trusted Companies In America" (2025)
- "America's Most Successful Small-Cap Companies" (2024, 2024)

Fortune

- "100 Fastest-Growing Companies" (2024)
- "Small Business 100" (2009 and 2008)

Boston Business Journal "Top 150 Public Companies"

The Boston Globe's "The Globe 100" (2013-2006)

24/7 Wall Street's "100 Best Small Companies in America" (2012)
