= Azenta =

Semiconductor Manufacturer

Azenta, Inc.
- Formerly: Brooks Automation
- Type: Public
- Traded as: Nasdaq: AZTA; S&P 600 component
- Industry: Biotechnology
- Founded: 1978; 48 years ago
- Headquarters: Burlington, Massachusetts, U.S.
- Key people: Stephen S. Schwartz (CEO); Lindon Robertson (CFO)
- Revenue: US$656 million (2024)
- Operating income: −24,735,000 United States dollar (2022)
- Net income: 2,132,859,000 United States dollar (2022)
- Number of employees: 2,984 (September 30, 2019)
- Website: www.azenta.com

Azenta, (formerly Brooks Automation) was founded in 1978, and is based in Burlington, Massachusetts, United States. The company is a provider of life sciences services including genomics, cryogenic storage, automation, and informatics.

== History ==
Brooks Automation was set up in 1978, and incorporated in 1994.

Brooks acquired the German company Jenoptik-Infab GmbH, subsidiary of M+W Zander, in 1999 to incorporate its mini-environment technology for 300 mm wafer handling.

In 2002, Brooks Automation, Inc. completed the acquisition of Intelligent Automation Systems, Inc. of Cambridge, Massachusetts, a custom automation company with technology and products for the semiconductor, photonics and life sciences industries.

Brooks Automation acquired the Celigo automated Cell Cytometer product line from Cyntellect, Inc in 2011. The same year, Brooks acquired Nexus Biosystems, which produced compound and sample management systems. The following year the company acquired intangible assets from Intevac, Inc. and acquired Crossing Automation Inc.

In October 2012, Brooks Automation entered into an agreement to acquire Crossing Automation Inc.

In April 2014, Brooks Automation entered into an agreement to sell its Granville-Phillips division to MKS Instruments.

Brooks closed the sale of Granville-Phillips to MKS Instruments on May 30, 2014.

Brooks automation announced the acquisition of Biostorage Technologies on 1 December 2015.

In 2017, Brooks acquired 4titude, a maker of scientific tools and consumables, while in 2018, Brooks acquired GENEWIZ, a genomics services provider as part of their life sciences division's expansion.

In November 2021, Brooks Automation Inc. split into two entities, Brooks Automation and Azenta Life Sciences. The latter will focus exclusively on their life science division.

In August 2022, Azenta Life Sciences has come to a definitive agreement to acquire B Medical Systems S.á.r.l., in a transaction of approx. €410 million (with an additional €50 million in future performance milestones) is expected to be completed by October 2022.

== Business ==
Brooks Automation operates in three segments: Brooks Product Solutions, Brooks Global Services, and Brooks Life Science Systems.

Brooks Automation provides mainly four kinds: semiconductor automation and life science systems equipment, gas analysis and vacuum measurement, cryopumps, cryochillers and compressors, asset tracking equipment. The company features in developing and building the handling system and related technology. Automation products are used to support both atmospheric and vacuum based processes while the company's focus remains on improving performance and productivity. The company provides vacuum pumps and instrumentation to maintain pressure consistency of the known process gas. The Brooks Life Science Systems provides automated sample management systems and equipment, such as automated blood fractionation equipment, cellular imaging, and consumables parts.

== Research and development ==
In January 2012, Brooks Automation announced that it had acquired the Celigo Cell Cytometer product line from Cyntellect Inc. Celigo had an advantage in cell imaging systems based on its unique combination of high-throughput, ease-of-use, and affordability.

In April 2012, Brooks Automation announced the Polycold Systems XC Cryochiller (a multi-purpose cooler) product line and set a new standard in the industry. With the new production line put into use in vacuum and thermal management applications, it would greatly increase water vapor pumping speed and decrease the operating costs.

In July 2013, Brooks Automation announced that it had signed a definitive agreement to acquire the assets and business of Matrical, Inc.($10 million) to expand the Brooks Life Science Systems business. Matrical focuses on biological sample preparation, management, and storage solutions.

== Awards ==
Brooks Automation won the R&D 100 award (100 most technologically significant new products introduced) by R&D Magazine for its Model 830 Vacuum Quality Monitor (VQMTM). VQMTM was used to determine gas composition with an electrostatic autoresonant ion trap.
