= Rush Enterprises =

American automotive company

- Company type: Public
- Traded as: Nasdaq: RUSHA (Class A); Nasdaq: RUSHB (Class B); Russell 2000 Component (RUSHA, RUSHB); S&P 600 Component (RUSHA)
- Industry: Automotive, Truck Dealerships
- Founded: 1965
- Founder: W. Marvin Rush
- Headquarters: New Braunfels, TX, USA
- Area served: USA and Canada
- Key people: W.M. "Rusty" Rush-President James C. Underwood-Director Thomas A. Akin-Director Raymond J. Chess-Director Dr. Kennon Guglielmo-Director William H. Cary-Director
- Products: Trucks
- Revenue: ▲US$ 4.727 billion (2017)
- Operating income: ▲$ 172.1 million (2017)
- Net income: ▲$ 105.8 million (2017)
- Total assets: ▲$ 2.890 billion (2017)
- Total equity: ▲$ 1.040 billion (2017)
- Number of employees: 7,244 (2017)
- Website: rushenterprises.com

Rush Enterprises is an American commercial vehicle dealership headquartered in New Braunfels, Texas. It primarily sells new and used trucks, through its Rush Truck Centers. In 2019, the company operated over 200 Rush Truck Centers in 20 U.S. states as well as 14 locations in Canada. As of 2020, it was a Fortune 500 corporation.

Rush Truck Centers operates the largest network of commercial vehicle dealerships in the United States, with more than 200 locations in 22 states; as of 2019 the company became international after opening 14 locations in Canada. They represent truck and bus manufacturers, including Peterbilt, International, Hino, Isuzu, Ford, IC Bus and Blue Bird.

== History ==
The company was founded in 1965 by W. Marvin Rush, who remained chairman of the board until 2013, when he was succeeded by his son W.M. "Rusty" Rush. The company began as a dealership for Peterbilt trucks, but expanded greatly in the intervening years through acquisition of dealerships.

Major acquisitions include:

- Heavy truck business from Asbury Automotive Group in 2010.

== Acquisitions ==
30-Sep-13	Transauthority
28-Oct-13	Prairie International Trucks
1-Jul-14	Truck Parts Depot
3-Nov-14	House of Trucks
8-Dec-14	North Florida Truck Parts
9-Feb-15	Effingham Truck Sales
4-May-15	Yancey Truck Centers
27-Jul-15	Dallas Truck Center
28-Sep-15	Peterbilt of Las Vegas
27-May-16	Transwest Truck Center Las Vegas
13-Dec-22	Summit Truck Group
