= Vericel =

American biopharmaceutical company

Vericel Corporation
- Formerly: Aastrom Biosciences, Inc.
- Company type: Public
- Traded as: Nasdaq: VCEL; Russell 2000 component S&P 600 component
- Industry: Biotechnology
- Founded: 1989; 37 years ago in Ann Arbor, Michigan, United States
- Headquarters: Cambridge, Massachusetts, United States
- Number of locations: 2
- Key people: Nick Colangelo (CEO); Daniel Orlando (COO); Gerard Michel (CFO)
- Products: MACI; Epicel; Carticel

Vericel Corporation is a publicly traded American biopharmaceutical company which was known prior to October 2014 as Aastrom Bio. Aastrom Bio was formed in 1989 in Ann Arbor, Michigan.

In the spring of 2014, Aastrom Bio acquired Sanofi's cell therapy and regenerative medicine business which Sanofi had acquired when purchasing Genzyme in 2011. This transformed Aastrom in several ways: it increased the employee count by 8-fold and provided a revenue stream and products to market, which it had not had before.

In October 2014, the company changed its name from Aastrom Bio to Vericel and relocated its headquarters from Ann Arbor, Michigan to Cambridge, Massachusetts.
