= Patrizio Vinciarelli =

Italian academic and businessman

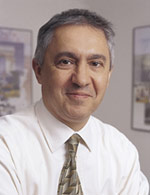
- Education: Sapienza University of Rome
- Scientific career
- Workplaces: Princeton University

Patrizio Vinciarelli is chairman of the board, president, and chief executive officer of Vicor Corporation, which he founded in 1981 and has led since its inception.

Prior to founding Vicor, Vinciarelli was a fellow from 1977 to 1980 at the Institute of Advanced Studies in Princeton, New Jersey and an instructor at Princeton University. From 1973 to 1976, he was a fellow at CERN, the Center for Nuclear Research in Geneva, Switzerland. Vinciarelli received his doctorate in Physics from the University of Rome, Italy.

Vinciarelli is published in over 40 academic publications, and holds more than 100 patents for power electronics/conversion technology.

== Patents ==
Patents include:

- Patrizio Vinciarelli, “Double-clamped ZVS buck–boost power converter,” U.S. Patent 7,561,446, issued on July 14, 2009
- Patrizio Vinciarelli, “Universal AC adapter,” U.S. Patent 7,548,441, issued on June 16, 2009
- Patrizio Vinciarelli, “Power converter package and thermal management,” U.S. Patent 7,361,844, issued on April 22, 2008
- Patrizio Vinciarelli, “Printed circuit transformer,” U.S. Patent 7,187,263, issued on March 6, 2007
- Patrizio Vinciarelli, “Buck-boost DC-DC switching power conversion, U.S. Patent 7,154,250, issued on December 26, 2006
- Patrizio Vinciarelli, “Factorized power architecture with point of load sine amplitude converters,” U.S. Patent 6,984,965, issued on January 10, 2006
- Patrizio Vinciarelli, Fred M. Finnemore, Michael B. LaFleur, and Charles I. McCauley, “Power converter packaging,” U.S. Patent 6,434,005, issued on August 13, 2002
- Patrizio Vinciarelli and Jay Prager, “Control of stored magnetic energy in power converter transformers,” U.S. Patent 5,805,434, issued on September 8, 1998
- Patrizio Vinciarelli and Richard E. Beede, “Efficient power conversion,” U.S. Patent 5,786,992, issued on July 28, 1998
- Patrizio Vinciarelli and Jay Prager, “Reverse energy transfer in zero-current switching power conversion,” U.S. Patent 5,668,466, issued on September 16, 1997
- Patrizio Vinciarelli, “Zero-current switching forward power converter operating in damped reverse boost mode,” U.S. Patent 5,291,385, issued on March 1, 1994
- Patrizio Vinciarelli and Jay M. Prager, “Zero-current switching forward power conversion apparatus and method with controllable energy transfer,” U.S. Patent 5,235,502, issued on August 10, 1993
- Patrizio Vinciarelli and Theodore R. Harpley, "DC to DC power converter", U.S. Design Patent 297,928, issued on October 4, 1988
