= Werner Enterprises =

American transportation and logistics company

Werner Enterprises, Inc.

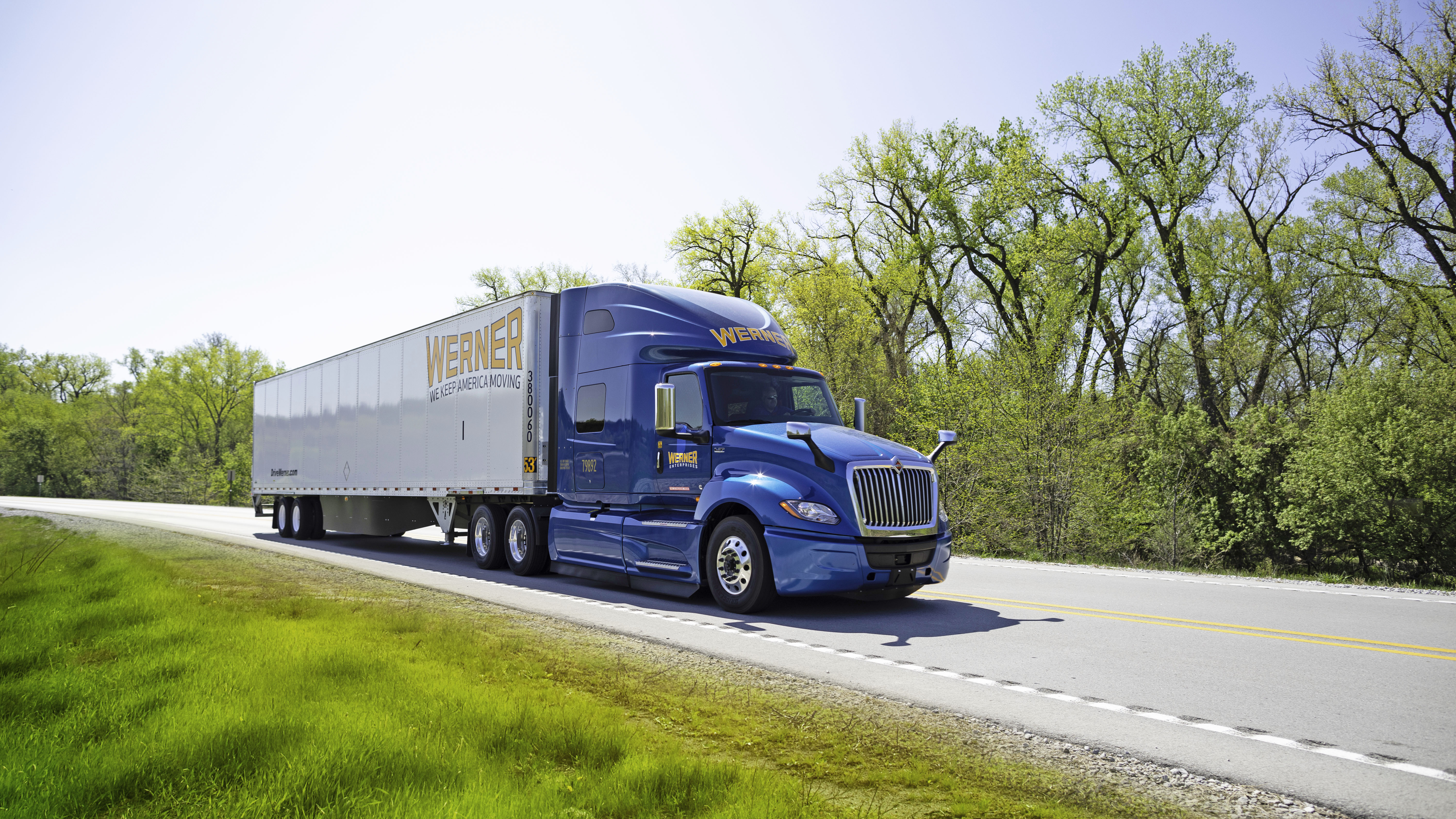
- International LT
- Type: Public
- Traded as: Nasdaq: WERN; S&P 600 component
- Founded: 1956; 70 years ago
- Founder: Clarence L. "CL" Werner
- Headquarters: Omaha, Nebraska, U.S.
- Key people: Derek J. Leathers; (chairman & CEO); Clarence L. Werner; (chairman Emeritus); Nathan Meisgeier; (president and Chief Legal Officer); Christopher D. Wikoff; (EVP, Treasurer & CFO); Eric J. Downing; (EVP & COO)
- Services: Freight management Freight transport
- Revenue: US$3.3 billion (2022)
- Operating income: US$323.1 million (2022)
- Net income: US$245.6 million (2022)
- Number of employees: approx. 14,000 (2023)
- Website: werner.com

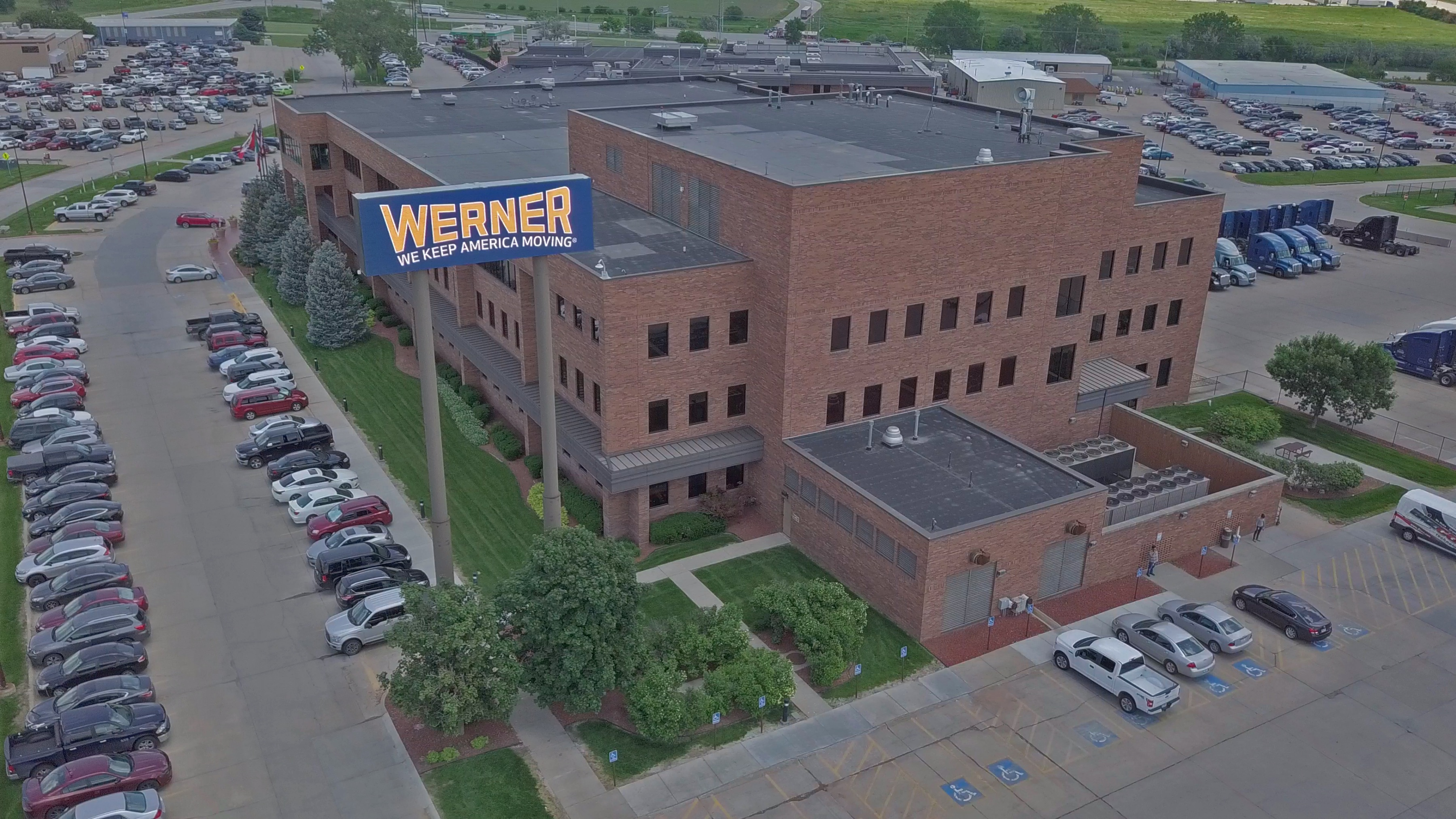
Werner's corporate headquarters Omaha, Nebraska

Werner Enterprises, Inc. is an American transportation and logistics company, serving the United States, Mexico and Canada. Werner Enterprises stated that it had 2023 revenues of $3.28 billion and over 14,000 employees and contractors.

== History ==
In 1956, Clarence "CL" Werner sold his family vehicle for a Ford Motor Company gasoline-powered truck, and began hauling cargo for other companies. In 1964, CL moved his company out of his home and into a shop in Council Bluffs, Iowa. In 1977, Werner Enterprises moved its corporate headquarters to its current location in Omaha, Nebraska. By 1999, Werner had expanded its operations into Mexico, reaching one billion dollars in revenue. Werner was among the six largest truckload and less-than-truckload (LTL) carriers in the United States in 2023.

== Acquisitions ==
In July 2021, Werner acquired regional truckload carriers ECM Transport Group (ECM Transport and Motor Carrier Service, LLC), expanding in the Mid-Atlantic, Ohio and Northeast regions.

In November 2021, Werner acquired final mile carrier NEHDS Logistics, LLC.

In October 2022, Werner acquired truckload carrier Baylor Trucking, Inc., expanding in the east central and south-central U.S. truckload markets.

In November 2022, Werner acquired asset-light logistics provider and truckload carrier, ReedTMS Logistics.

== Operations ==
Werner's fleet consists of approximately 8,300 trucks, 30,000 trailers and employs 14,300 employees and independent contractors. The company conducts business in more than 150 countries, with offices in the U.S., Canada and Mexico. It is the largest truckload transportation provider serving the Mexico cross-border market.

Werner's common stock trades on the NASDAQ Global Select Market under the symbol WERN. Werner announced its Werner DRIVE strategy in 2022, which stands for Durable, Results, Innovation, Values and ESG. Building on the "5Ts + S" strategy, Werner DRIVE incorporates sustainability, capital allocation, an outcome-oriented approach to operations, a drive to innovate and a culture that supports and values its team members.
