= Phillips Edison & Company =

American real estate investment trust

- Type: Public
- Traded as: Nasdaq: PECO; S&P 600 Component
- Industry: Real Estate Investment Trust
- Founded: 1991
- Headquarters: 11501 Northlake Drive, Cincinnati, Ohio
- Area served: United States
- Key people: Jeffery Edison (CEO); John Caufield (CFO)
- Revenue: ▲US$519.4 million (2021)
- Net income: ▲US$17.23 million (2021)
- Total assets: ▼US$4.668 billion (2021)
- Total equity: ▲US$2.476 billion (2021)
- Number of employees: 290
- Website: phillipsedison.com

Phillips Edison & Company is an American REIT that owns and develops shopping centers throughout the United States. Founded in 1991, the company is headquartered in Sycamore Township, Ohio, and has offices in Salt Lake City, Utah and Atlanta, Georgia. The company wholly owns 268 shopping centers and has partial ownership interest in 21 other facilities in a combined 31 states. Its largest tenants by square footage leases included: Publix, Kroger, Albertsons, and Walmart.

== History ==
The company was founded by Mike Phillips and Jeff Edison, former employees of Taubman Centers, to invest in community and neighborhood shopping centers. The company acquired its first property in 1992, and subsequently began investing in other properties across the U.S. through a series of private funds.

In 2010, Phillips Edison & Company launched Phillips Edison—ARC Shopping Center REIT Inc., the first of two non-traded real estate investment trusts (REITs). In 2013, Phillips Edison & Company created Phillips Edison – ARC Grocery Center REIT II, Inc. Phillips Edison & Company rebranded its non-traded REITs in [2014] as Phillips Edison Grocery Center REIT I and Phillips Edison Grocery Center REIT II.

In 2015, Phillips Edison & Company separated its Strategic Investment and Net Lease Investment business units into a standalone company called PECO Real Estate Partners, allowing Phillips Edison & Company to "focus exclusively on growing and enhancing the value of its grocery-anchored shopping center portfolio."

In 2016, Phillips Edison & Company was ranked in Inc. (magazine) as one of the 5,000 fastest-growing private firms in the nation and the 14th largest retail owner by square footage by National Real Estate Investor.

In July 2021, the company went public on the Nasdaq, under symbol PECO.

== Business Model ==
Phillips Edison & Company has in-house leasing, property management, accounting, acquisitions, dispositions, development and financing teams. The company is focused exclusively on "investing in grocery-anchored shopping centers."

== See also ==
- Shopping property management firms
