= Primoris Services Corporation =

American construction and infrastructure company

- Type: Public
- Traded as: Nasdaq: PRIM; Russell 2000 component; S&P 600 component
- Industry: Energy Industry; Utilities Construction
- Founded: 1960; 66 years ago
- Headquarters: Dallas, Texas
- Key people: Koti Vadlamudi, President and CEO
- Revenue: ▲$ 7.57 billion (2025)
- Operating income: ▲$ 411.5 million (FY 2025)
- Net income: ▲$ 274.9 million (FY 2025)
- Total assets: ▲$ 4.4 billion (FY 2025)
- Total equity: ▲$ 4.4 billion (FY 2025)
- Number of employees: ~18,500 (2025)
- Website: prim.com

Primoris Services Corporation is a publicly traded specialty construction and infrastructure company based in the United States, with a particular focus on pipelines for natural gas, wastewater and water. In 2026, the company was ranked 497th in the Fortune 500.

== History ==
The company was founded as ARB, Inc. in Bakersfield, California in 1960, Primoris was founded in 2004, in Nevada, as the parent company. In 2008, it was incorporated as a public company in Delaware. In 2014, it became a Fortune 1000 company.

On June 22, 2026, the company announced a major reduction to its financial forecast, which resulted in a $29.2% decline in its stock value, and multiple investigations by law firms. It also announced the departure of its COO.

== Acquisitions ==
The company has expanded significantly through acquisitions, including:

- James Construction Group LLC in 2009.
- Rockford Corporation in 2010 for $82.6 million. Subsequently worked on the pipeline and underground unit of the Atlantic Coast Pipeline.
- Sprint Pipeline Services, L.P. in 2012.
- Q3 Contracting Inc., a gas pipeline service, in 2012 for $48.1 million in cash.
- Coastal Field Services, a Beaumont, Texas pipeline and maintenance contractor, in 2017.
- PLH Group, an Irving, Texas construction, maintenance and engineering services contractor, valued at $470 million, in 2022.
- PayneCrest Electric, a St. Louis, Missouri electrical design, construction and maintenance company, for $422 million, in 2026.
