= Geospace Technologies =

Seismic data acquisition equipment manufacturer

- Type: Public
- Traded as: Nasdaq: GEOS
- Industry: Geoscience
- Founded: 1980; 46 years ago
- Headquarters: Houston, Texas, United States
- Website: www.geospace.com

Geospace Technologies Corporation is a manufacturer of specialized electronics and seismic data acquisition equipment used in the oil and gas industry. Geospace Technologies has been publicly traded on the NASDAQ stock exchange since November 1997.

== History ==
The company was founded in 1980 when Tokyo-based OYO Corporation entered the North American seismic instrumentation market. In 1983, OYO U.S.A was a subsidiary of OYO Japan’s North American, and operations were conducted through a wholly owned holding company. In 1985, AMF Geo Space Corporation specializing in the geophone and hydrophone operations was announced to be sold by its parent company AMF Inc. A year later OYO U.S.A. acquired AMF Geo Space Corporation. OYO Geospace Corporation was established in 1994 as a subsidiary of OYO U.S.A. by combining Houston Geophysical Products and the AMF thermal plotter line. On November 20, 1997, the firm shares were listed on NASDAQ. In 1998, OYO Geospace Corporation acquired JRC/Concord Technologies Inc., a company specializing in the design and manufacture of marine seismic streamer accessories.

In February 2012, OYO Corporation U.S.A. sold its shares of OYO Geospace Corporation. On October 1, 2012, OYO Geospace Corporation changed its name and ticker symbol to Geospace Technologies Corporation. At the same time, the plotter line OYO Instruments was renamed to EXILE Technologies.

In July 2018, the company acquired Quantum Technology Sciences, a privately held security and surveillance sensing technology company.

In November 2018, Geospace bought the Norwegian-based PGS’s Optoseis, a fiber optic permanent reservoir monitoring company.

In April 2020, the company received a $10 million contract with the Department of Homeland Security to provide a border security technology product to the U.S. Customs and Border Protection. In July 2021, Geospace Technologies acquired 100 percent shares of Aquana, LLC.
