= H2O America =

- Type: Public
- Traded as: Nasdaq: HTO; S&P 600 Component; Russell 2000 Component
- Industry: water utilities
- Founded: 1866; 160 years ago
- Headquarters: San Jose, California, U.S.
- Area served: North America
- Revenue: $573.7 million (2021)
- Net income: $60.5 million (2021)
- Number of employees: ~385
- Subsidiaries: Connecticut Water Service; Maine Water Service; San Jose Water; Texas Water
- Website: www.sjwgroup.com

H2O America (formerly known as SJW Group) ("SJW") is a water utility processing, distribution, wholesale and retail company based in San Jose, California. It serves 228,000 connections that serves over 1 million residents in regions of California, and approximately 17,000 connections, which serves about 60,000 people in Texas. The enterprise value (as of December 2021) is $3.76 billion.

== Operations ==
The company has four subsidiaries, comprising San Jose Water Company, SJWTX, Inc., SJW Land Company as well as Texas Water Alliance Limited (TWA). TWA is engaged in operating the essential water supply activities in Texas. The company's diverse utility property include land held in fee, impounding reservoirs, diversion facilities, wells, distribution storage, and all water facilities, equipment, office buildings, etc. In 2012, the revenue generated by purchased water made up about 40% to 45% of the company’s annual revenue.

The company attended the industry’s conference, Water Utility Conference of 2013, as one of the largest water utility companies in the U.S.

In October 2018, it was announced that SJW was acquiring Connecticut Water Service, a water utility company serving communities in Connecticut and Maine, pending federal approval. The acquisition was completed in October 2019.
