= William J. McMorrow =

American businessman

William J. McMorrow is an American Business Executive who serves as the Chairman and CEO of Kennedy Wilson, a global real estate investment company. He acquired the company in 1988. In October 2017 the company acquired the 76 percent of Kennedy Wilson Europe that it did not already own, resulting in an $8 billion global real estate platform. The company also has a joint-venture affordable housing partnership with Vintage Housing.

== Early life ==
McMorrow is a Southern California native. He grew up in Malibu as one of nine children and his father was a U.S. Navy Fighter pilot.

== Education ==
McMorrow received a Bachelor of Science Degree in Business from the University of Southern California in 1969 and went on to receive an MBA in 1970, also from USC. He also attended Loyola High School in Los Angeles.

== Philanthropy ==
McMorrow’s primary charitable endeavors include supporting education and U.S. Veterans. As a member of the Navy SEAL Foundation Board of Directors, he helped raise more than $5 million for the organization at a 2018 Los Angeles Evening of Tribute sponsored by Kennedy Wilson. At The University of Southern California, where he sits on the Board of Trustees, Bill endowed the Neighborhood Academic Initiative, which provides support for students in South and East Los Angeles. McMorrow established the Military Veterans Initiative, which helps student-veterans earn a USC degree and find employment and he also helped to found With Your Shield, A McMorrow Veterans Initiative, which is a certificate program developed through USC Marshall School of Business designed to support Veterans and their families in the post-deployment phase by providing networking opportunities and education to ease the transition back to civilian life.
