= Avanos Medical =

American medical technology company

Avanos Medical, Inc.
- Formerly: Halyard Health, Inc. (2014–2018)
- Type: Private
- Traded as: NYSE: AVNS
- Industry: Healthcare
- Founded: 2014; 12 years ago
- Headquarters: Alpharetta, Georgia
- Area served: Worldwide
- Key people: Joseph F. Woody (CEO)
- Products: Digestive Health; Respiratory Health; Pain Management; Intravenous therapy
- Number of employees: 5,380 (2020)
- Parent: American Industrial Partners
- Website: avanos.com

Avanos Medical, Inc. is a medical technology company making clinical medical devices. The company consists of two franchises – Pain Management and Chronic Care – that address reducing the use of opioids while helping patients recover faster and preventing infection.

== History ==
Avanos Medical also manufactures and distributes Eternal Access System to help healthcare providers to fit feeding tubes into a patient safely - that is the Cortak 2.

They describe Cortrak 2 system as "a time-saving solution that benefits nurses of all levels, dieticians, and GI and ICU doctors."

In April 2022, it was reported that a voluntary field correction had been issued by the company for a vital hospital tool that could have led to injury or even death.

Avanos sells its brands and products in more than 90 countries and operates 8 principal medical device production facilities – generating approximately $612 million in net revenue.

In April 2026, Avanos agreed to be acquired by affiliates of American Industrial Partners. The acquisition was completed in July 2026.
