= Vital Farms =

American egg and butter brand

Vital Farms, Inc.
- Type: Public
- Traded as: Nasdaq: VITL
- Industry: Food processing
- Founded: 2007; 19 years ago
- Founder: Matt O'Hayer
- Headquarters: Austin, Texas, United States
- Key people: Russell Diez-Canseco (CEO) Thilo Wrede (CFO) Pete Pappas (Chief Sales Officer & President, Eggs) Kathryn McKeon (CMO & General Manager, Butter)
- Products: Eggs, butter
- Revenue: US$658 million (TTM, June 2025)
- Website: vitalfarms.com

Vital Farms, Inc. is an American egg and butter brand founded by Matt O'Hayer in 2007 and headquartered in Austin, Texas. Vital Farms' products are sold in more than 23,500 stores across the country. The company accounts for approximately 3% of U.S. egg sales and by the end of 2025 had reached nearly $1 billion in annual revenue.

As of the first quarter of 2026, Vital Farms works with over 600 family-owned farms across the U.S. It is a publicly-traded company on Nasdaq (VITL) and a certified B Corporation.

== History ==
In 2007, Matt O'Hayer moved to Austin, Texas. After discussing humane food production during a scuba-diving trip to Indonesia, O'Hayer launched Vital Farms with 20 hens on a 27-acre farm. He initially sold eggs to local restaurants and farmers' markets from the back of his Subaru. By 2008, Vital Farms had secured distribution with Whole Foods and the grocer began selling its eggs in the Midwest.

In 2017, the company opened its first egg washing and packaging facility in Springfield, MO, coined “Egg Central Station.”

In May 2019, the company appointed Russell Diez-Canseco as president and CEO.

On July 31, 2020, the company went public in a $125 million IPO on NASDAQ under the ticker symbol VITL. By August of that year, Vital Farms stock price had risen 60%. Its largest shareholders are institutional investors.

Vital Farms added approximately 75 new farms during the third quarter of 2025, bringing their network to over 10 million hens.

In 2025, the company started construction on its second egg washing and packing facility in Seymour, Indiana, dubbed Vital Crossroads (VXR). Also in 2025, Vital Farms partnered with comedian Heather McMahan to create a line of limited-edition, specialty dog treats.

In February of 2026, Vital Farms founder Matt O’Hayer stepped down as executive chairperson to pursue other ventures. The company appointed President and CEO Russell Diez-Canseco as the new executive chairperson.

In 2026, Vital Farms created a Route 66 themed food truck, the “Good Eggs Diner” to celebrate the centennial celebration of Route 66 in Springfield, MO, where its egg washing facility is headquartered. In May 2026, the company announced that it would stop selling butter products by the end of the fiscal year to focus solely on eggs.

A class action lawsuit was filed against Vital Farms in 2026 alleging that the company misled shareholders by failing to communicate missteps in the implementation of a new ERP system.

In 2026, Vital Farms faced consumer scrutiny over its hen feed ingredients after a third-party lab test alleged that linoleic acid made up roughly 23% of the fat in Vital Farms eggs.

Vital Farms responded to public scrutiny directly on social media, stating that its feed ingredients have always been openly disclosed on the company’s website and that alternative feed options had been explored.

== Products ==
Vital Farms maintains direct relationships with a network of family-owned farms and also owns and operates a small number of company-owned “Accelerator Farms”. All farms in the Vital Farms network are certified under the Certified Humane program administered by Humane Farm Animal Care.

Vital Farms has several lines of egg products, including pasture-raised eggs and organic pasture-raised eggs. It also produces a line of pasture-raised hard-boiled eggs and pasture-raised "True Blue" eggs. The company's egg cartons feature a QR code where consumers can identify the farm where their eggs were produced, and its website provides 360-degree footage of participating farms' pastures.

In 2022, the company announced a new line of restorative eggs, which are produced using regenerative agriculture techniques developed with Understanding Ag, a regenerative agriculture consulting firm. Vital Farms worked with Regen Ag Lab to track key changes in biodiversity and water retention on the first farms to produce restorative eggs. The product line received a 4-star rating on The Cornucopia Institute’s Organic Egg Scorecard.

== Animal welfare ==
Vital Farms hens have access to the outdoors and feed that consists primarily of corn and soybean meal. In 2021, PETA worked with consumers to bring forward a class-action lawsuit which alleged that Vital Farms misled customers with false and deceptive marketing practices. PETA was not involved in the class action lawsuit after 2023 and the lawsuit was dismissed in September 2024.

== See also ==
- Free-range eggs
- Pastured poultry
- B Corporation
- Kerrygold
- Foster Farms
