= Kennedy Wilson =

Global real estate investment company

Kennedy-Wilson Holdings, Inc.
- Type: Private
- Traded as: NYSE: KW
- Industry: Private equity real estate
- Founded: 1977; 49 years ago
- Headquarters: Beverly Hills, California, United States
- Area served: Worldwide
- Key people: William J. McMorrow (CEO & Chairman)
- AUM: $28 billion (2024)
- Parent: Fairfax Financial
- Website: www.kennedywilson.com

Kennedy Wilson is a real estate investment company headquartered in Beverly Hills, California, United States.

== History ==
Kennedy Wilson was founded in 1977 and first went public on Nasdaq in 1992 before later transitioning back to private ownership in 2004. In 2009, the company went public again as Kennedy Wilson Holdings, Inc.

The company entered the European market in 2011 when it served as the lead investor in the recapitalization of the Bank of Ireland. The investors became the top commercial property owners in the country, and then expanded with offices in Dublin, London, Madrid and Jersey overseeing a $4 billion property portfolio. Kennedy Wilson Europe Real Estate Plc was listed on the London Stock Exchange in 2014.

In 2017, the company closed a transaction that combined Kennedy Wilson Holdings and Kennedy Wilson Europe Real Estate Plc into one company.

In 2019, it was reported that Kennedy Wilson would spend more than $600m in the next few years on various office and residential projects taking place in Ireland.

In July 2020, A $63 million loan to a multi-family development in the Boulder, Colorado area was the first investment created by a $2 billion real estate program in the US, UK, and Ireland. Kennedy Wilson and Fairfax Financial initiated the $2 billion project.

In February 2026, Fairfax joined a consortium led by Kennedy-Wilson CEO William McMorrow to take the real estate firm private in a deal valued at approximately US$1.5 billion. Once closed, Fairfax will hold a majority economic interest in the company.
