= Simulations Plus =

Simulations Plus, Inc.
- Company type: Public
- Traded as: Nasdaq: SLP
- Industry: Software
- Founded: 1996; 30 years ago in Lancaster, California
- Founder: Walter Woltosz
- Headquarters: Research Triangle Park, North Carolina, U.S.
- Products: Software; GastroPlus; MonolixSuite; ADMET Predictor; DILIsym; Thales; Pro-ficiency
- Number of employees: >200
- Website: simulations-plus.com

Simulations Plus, Inc. develops absorption, distribution, metabolism, excretion, and toxicity (ADMET) modeling and simulation software for the pharmaceutical and biotechnology, industrial chemicals, cosmetics, food ingredients, and herbicide industries. In September 2014, the company acquired Cognigen Corporation, a provider of clinical trial data analysis and consulting services.
