= Investors Bank =

Bank in New Jersey, USA

Investors Bancorp, Inc.
- Type: Subsidiary
- Traded as: Nasdaq: ISBC
- Industry: Banking
- Founded: 1926; 100 years ago
- Defunct: 2023; all branches rebranded as Citizens Bank
- Headquarters: Short Hills, New Jersey, United States
- Area served: New Jersey, New York (some loans available in other states)
- Net income: $57.9 Million (Q1 2018)
- Total assets: $25.23 Billion (Q1 2018)
- Parent: Citizens Financial Group (2022—2023)
- Subsidiaries: Investors Home Mortgage, Investors Financial
- Website: www.myinvestorsbank.com

Investors Bank was a publicly traded, full-service bank that was based in Short Hills, New Jersey, USA. The bank operated over 150 branches across New Jersey and New York.

The bank operated from 1926 until 2022 as an independent entity, then was purchased by Citizens Financial Group. Investors Bank continued to operate as a subsidiary of Citizens while the company worked to merge the operations of the two banks into one; this was completed on February 28, 2023, when all Investors Bank branches were rebranded as Citizens Bank.

== History ==
In 1926, the bank was incorporated as the Washington Rock Building and Loan Association. Sixteen years later, its name changed to Investors Savings and Loan Association. Through mergers, acquisitions, and internal expansion, the bank grew and eventually changed its name to Investors Savings Bank.

In 1997, Investors changed from a New Jersey-chartered mutual savings bank to a New Jersey-chartered stock savings bank, and reorganized as a two-tiered holding company. The bank became a wholly owned subsidiary of Investors Bancorp, Inc., a Delaware-chartered, mid-tier stock holding company, and Investors Bancorp Inc. became a wholly owned subsidiary of Investors Bancorp MHC.

In 2005, Investors Bancorp Inc. became a partially public company, trading common stock on the NASDAQ. In 2011, the bank rebranded itself and changed its name to Investors Bank. On May 8, 2014, Investors Bancorp became a fully public company.

Investors Bank was acquired by Citizens Financial Group in 2022. By February 28, 2023, all Investors locations were rebranded as Citizens Bank.

== Acquisitions ==
Sources:

- 1942: Millburn Building and Loan Association
- 1943: Connecticut Farms Building and Loan Association, Battle Hill Building and Loan Association
- 1947: Brick Church Savings and Loan Association
- 1958: Lyons Farms Building and Loan Association
- 1963: Divident Hill Savings and Loan Association
- 1969: Plainfield Savings and Loan Association
- 1973: Camptown Savings and Loan Association
- 1977: Supreme Savings and Loan Association
- 1991: East Jersey Savings Bank
- 1995: five Carteret Federal Savings Bank branches
- 2008: Summit Federal Savings Bank
- 2009: American Bank of New Jersey, six Banco Popular branches in New Jersey
- 2010: seventeen Millennium BCP Bank branches (entire US operations; four branches were later sold by Investors Bank)
- 2012: Brooklyn Federal Savings Bank, Marathon Bank
- 2013: Roma Bank, RomAsia Bank
- 2014: GCF Bank
- 2019: Gold Coast Bank
- 2021: eight New Jersey and eastern Pennsylvania branches of Berkshire Bank
