= Patterson-UTI =

American company

Patterson-UTI Energy, Inc.
- Formerly: Patterson Drilling Company (1978-2001)
- Type: Public
- Traded as: Nasdaq: PTEN; S&P 600 component
- Industry: Petroleum industry
- Founded: 1978; 48 years ago
- Headquarters: Houston, Texas, U.S.
- Key people: Mark S. Siegel (chairman); William Andrew Hendricks Jr. (president & CEO)
- Services: Well drilling
- Revenue: ▲US$2.356 billion (2017)
- Net income: ▲US$0.006 billion (2017)
- Total assets: ▲US$5.758 billion (2017)
- Total equity: ▲US$3.982 billion (2017)
- Number of employees: 5,800 (February 7, 2020)
- Website: patenergy.com

Patterson-UTI Energy, Inc. provides land drilling and pressure pumping services, directional drilling, rental equipment and technology to clients in the United States and western Canada.

Patterson-UTI Companies include:

- Patterson-UTI Drilling
- Universal Pressure Pumping
- MS Directional
- Great Plains Oilfield Rental
- Warrior Rig Technologies
- Current Power Solutions
- Superior QC
- NexTier OFS

== History ==
Patterson Drilling Company was founded in 1978 by Cloyce Talbott and Glenn Patterson. UTI Energy was formed in 1986 to purchase Universal Well Services, Union Supply Company, Triad Drilling Company, and International Petroleum Services Company. In 2001, Patterson Drilling acquired UTI Energy and renamed the company Patterson-UTI Energy.

In September 2014, the company acquired Texas-based pressure pumping assets.

In September 2016, the company acquired Warrior Rig.

In April 2017, the company acquired Seventy Seven Energy. The deal included Seventy Seven's affiliates: Great Plains Oilfield Rental, Nomac Drilling (now part of Patterson-UTI Drilling), and Performance Technologies (now part of Universal Pressure Pumping).

In October 2017, the company acquired MS Energy Services (now MS Directional).

In February 2018, the company acquired Superior QC, a provider of software used to improve the accuracy of horizontal wellbore placement.

In October 2018, the company acquired Current Power Solutions, Inc.

In October 2021, Patterson-UTI announced that it completed the acquisition of Pioneer Energy Services.

In September 2023, the company merged with NexTier OFS
