= Napco Security Technologies =

Security company

Napco Security Technologies, Inc.
- Company type: Public
- Traded as: Nasdaq: NSSC; Russell 2000 component; S&P 600 component
- Founded: 1969; 57 years ago
- Headquarters: Amityville, New York, U.S.
- Area served: Worldwide
- Key people: Richard L. Soloway (CEO, president, executive chairman, Sec. }}); Kevin S. Buchel (CFO, Principal Accounting Officer, SVP of Operations & Fin., Treasurer and director) (2013.12)
- Products: security products, like Alarm Lock, Continental Access, Marks USA
- Services: Security & Protection Services
- Revenue: ▲$73.41M (2014.1.30)
- Number of employees: 908(2013.12)
- Website: www.napcosecurity.com

Napco Security Technologies, Inc. was set up in 1969 and now is based in Amityville, New York. The company focuses on security products, such as electronic locking devices, alarm systems, and building access control systems. The company was formerly known as Napco Security Systems, Inc.

== Products ==
The company's building access control systems include different kinds of identification readers, control panels, PC-based computers, and electronically activated door-locking devices; alarm systems include automatic communicators, control panels, digital keypad systems, door security devices. In addition to the major two companies, the company also provides peripheral equipment and Video Surveillance Systems, including video cameras and monitors, recording device and remote communication device.

== Brands ==
The company specializes in security systems, including alarm locks and continental access. Their product offerings encompass Gemini and the latest F64-Series hardwire/wireless intrusion systems, iSee Video internet video solutions, Trilogy standalone electronic PIN/Proxy access locks, as well as Marks USA's i-Que lock and Hi-Security cylinder lines.

== Research and development ==
Jan 2014, NAPCO Security Technologies, Inc. introduced the new SaaS-based products iBridge Connected Home solutions, enabling remote management of thermostats, locks, lighting, video cameras, and other appliances via most smartphones.

In August 2013, the company announced the availability of the Continental Access Accelaterm CICP2800 Super-Speed Controller that provided greater speed, functionality and integration for credential performance.
