= Radian Group =

Mortgage insurance company

Radian Group Inc.
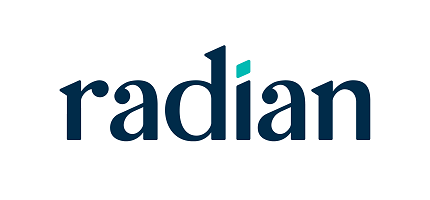
- Company type: Public
- Traded as: NYSE: RDN; Russell 2000 component S&P 600 component
- Industry: Financial technology & Insurance & Finance
- Founded: 1977 (as CMAC)
- Headquarters: Philadelphia, Pennsylvania
- Key people: Richard Thornberry (CEO)
- Website: http://www.radian.com

Radian Group Inc. (NYSE: RDN) is a mortgage insurance company with a suite of mortgage, risk, real estate, and title services.

The company is headquartered at Centre Square in Philadelphia.

== Radian Companies ==
Radian is a group of separately capitalized companies that share a unified strategic focus. Radian's core business, Radian Guaranty Inc., provides private mortgage insurance to protect lenders from default-related losses, facilitate the sale of low-down-payment mortgages in the secondary market and enable homebuyers to purchase homes with down-payments less than 20%. In 2019 it had a net income of $672.3 million. Vanguard Group Inc, FMR LLC, Blackrock Inc are some of the highest stock holders of Radian Group Inc.

== Acquisitions ==
In December 2025, it was announced that Radian had received all regulatory approvals for its planned US$1.7 billion acquisition of Inigo Limited, a specialty insurer operating through Lloyd’s of London. The deal would see Inigo operate as a Radian business unit while retaining its London presence.
