= Vicor Corporation =

Company that designs, manufactures and markets modular power components

- Type: Public
- Traded as: Nasdaq: VICR; S&P 400 component
- Industry: Electronics industry
- Founded: 1981; 45 years ago
- Headquarters: Andover, Massachusetts, U.S.
- Key people: Patrizio Vinciarelli (chairman of the board, president and CEO)
- Products: Power modules
- Revenue: ▲US$399.079 million (2022)
- Total assets: ▲US$536.901 million (2022)
- Total equity: ▲US$464.088 million (2022)
- Number of employees: 1,088 (2022)
- Website: vicorpower.com

Vicor Corporation is a manufacturer of power modules headquartered in Andover, Massachusetts.

== History and overview ==
Vicor Corporation, incorporated in 1981 in Andover, Massachusetts, designs, manufactures, and markets modular power components and complete power systems. These are used in electronic products to convert power from a primary power source (typically either alternating current from a mains outlet or direct current from a battery, rectifier or high-voltage direct current power distribution system) into the specific direct current required by electronic circuits. Vicor sells its products in North and South America, as well as internationally through independent distributors, to business-to-business (B2B) customers in automotive, computing, industrial equipment and automation, robotics, vehicles and transportation, unmanned aerial vehicles, satellites, and aerospace and defense.

Patrizio Vinciarelli is Vicor's chair of the board, president, and chief executive officer. As of 2022, Vicor had 11 subsidiaries, legally domiciled as follows: Vicor GmbH (Germany); VICR Securities Corporation (Massachusetts, US); Vicor France SARL (France); Vicor Italy SRL (Italy); Vicor Hong Kong Ltd. (Hong Kong); Vicor U.K. Ltd. (United Kingdom); Vicor Japan Company Ltd. (Japan); Vicor KK (Japan); Vicor Trading (Shanghai) Limited (China); Vicor Development Corporation (Delaware, US), including Freedom Power Systems, Inc. (Delaware, US) and Northwest Power, Inc. (Delaware, US); 560 Oakmead LLC (California, US).
