= Methode Electronics =

American manufacturing company

Methode Electronics, Inc.
- Company type: Public
- Traded as: NYSE: MEI
- Industry: Electronics
- Founded: 1946
- Headquarters: Southfield, Michigan, U.S.
- Area served: Worldwide
- Key people: Jonathan B. DeGaynor (President and CEO)
- Products: Electronic components; Sensors & switches; Automotive
- Revenue: ▼US$1.0481 billion (2025)
- Operating income: ▲US$(23.9) million (2025)
- Net income: ▲US$(62.6) million (2025)
- Total assets: ▼US$1.3058 billion (2025)
- Total equity: ▼US$693.3 million (2025)
- Number of employees: c. 6,500 (2025)
- Website: methode.com

Methode Electronics (NYSE: MEI) is an American multinational company headquartered in Southfield, Michigan, with engineering, manufacturing and sales operations in more than 35 locations in 14 countries. The company employs around 6,500 people worldwide.

== Acquisitions ==
In 1962, Methode acquired Carter Precision Electric Co., Inc., expanding its position into automotive controls and switches.

In October 2017, Methode acquired Pacific Insight Electronics Corp., a Canada-based designer and manufacturer of automotive and commercial vehicle lighting and electronics. The transaction, valued at approximately US $114 million, expanded Methode’s position with North American OEMs and added development resources and manufacturing capacity in Canada and Mexico.

On August 20, 2018, Methode announced it had entered a definitive agreement to acquire Grakon Parent, Inc., a global supplier of interior and exterior lighting systems, controls, and trim components for commercial vehicle OEMs, including heavy truck, bus, rail, and powersports manufacturers. The acquisition closed later in 2018 at a purchase price of approximately US $420 million, representing Methode’s largest acquisition to date and significantly expanding its footprint in the heavy-duty and specialty vehicle lighting market.
