= S&P 600 =

American small-cap stock market index

S&P SmallCap 600
- Foundation: December 30, 1994; 31 years ago
- Operator: S&P Dow Jones Indices
- Exchanges: NYSE, Nasdaq, Cboe
- Trading symbol: SML; ^SML; SP600; ^SP600
- Constituents: 602 (May 29, 2026)
- Type: Small-cap
- Market cap: US$1.83 trillion (May 29, 2026)
- Weighting method: Free-float capitalization-weighted
- Related indices: S&P 1000; S&P 1500
- Website: www.spglobal.com/spdji/en/indices/equity/sp-600/

Industry classification of the components of the index per the Global Industry Classification Standard as of July 1, 2026
1. Information Technology (12.7%)
2. Financials (18.8%)
3. Communication Services (3.46%)
4. Consumer Discretionary (14.1%)
5. Health Care (10.8%)
6. Industrials (18.1%)
7. Consumer Staples (3.47%)
8. Energy (5.82%)
9. Utilities (1.99%)
10. Materials (4.30%)
11. Real Estate (6.32%)
Contribution of component indices to S&P 1500 market cap as of August 31, 2026
1. (92.3%) S&P 500: 68,828,211.97
2. (5.08%) S&P MidCap 400: 3,788,135.2
3. (2.61%) S&P SmallCap 600: 1,942,867.17
Values are in US$ millions.

The S&P 600 (S&P SmallCap 600 or Standard and Poor's 600) is a stock market index tracking the stock performance of 600 companies listed on stock exchanges in the United States that are considered to have small market capitalizations. The S&P 600 is a subset of the S&P 1500, comprising about 2.6% of its market cap as of August 31, 2026. It is maintained by S&P Dow Jones Indices and its components are selected by a committee. For a list of the criteria for addition to the index, see S&P 1500 § Selection criteria.

The index is a public-float-weighted/capitalization-weighted index. The index includes approximately 2.5% of the total market capitalization of U.S. public companies, with an aggregate market capitalization of more than $1.4 trillion as of December 31, 2025. The median market capitalization of the components of the index is $2.6 billion and components range in market capitalization from $357 million to $12.1 billion.

Products linked to the S&P 600 include index funds (exchange-traded funds/ETFs and mutual funds) as well as derivatives (options and futures contracts), which are available for trading in many countries with the goal of replicating the performance of the index. Also available are modified index funds; they replicate the performance of the index with modifications such as the use of covered call strategies, equal weighting, performance buffers, leverage, inclusion of only growth or value stocks, or exclusion of certain sectors, all with the goal of changing the risk/return and yield. In total, there was approximately $172 billion in assets tracking the index as of December 31, 2024.

The index is associated with many ticker symbols, including ^SP600 and ^SML.

== Annual returns ==
Annual returns have been as follows:

Year	Price return (excluding dividends)	Total return (including dividends)
2025	4.23%	6.02%
2024	6.82%	8.70%
2023	13.89%	16.05%
2022	−17.42%	−16.10%
2021	25.27%	26.82%
2020	9.57%	11.29%
2019	20.86%	22.78%
2018	−9.75%	−8.48%
2017	11.73%	13.23%
2016	24.75%	26.56%
2015	−3.36%	−1.97%
2014	4.44%	5.76%
2013	39.65%	41.31%
2012	14.81%	16.33%
2011	−0.16%	1.02%
2010	24.98%	26.31%
2009	23.78%	25.57%
2008	−31.99%	−31.07%
2007	−1.22%	−0.30%
2006	14.07%	15.12%
2005	6.65%	7.68%
2004	21.59%	22.65%
2003	38.79%	
2002	−14.63%	
2001	6.54%	
2000	11.80%	
1999	12.40%	
1998	−1.31%	
1997	25.58%	
1996	21.32%	
1995	29.96%	
1994	−4.77%	

== See also ==
- List of S&P 600 companies
- Historical components of the S&P 600
- List of recessions in the United States
