= Great American Bank =

American bank

Great American Bank, FSB
- Formerly: San Diego Building and Loan Association (1885–1936); San Diego Federal Savings and Loan Association (1936–1982); Great American Federal Savings and Loan Association (1982–1984); Great American First Savings Bank (1984–1987)
- Company type: Public
- Industry: Thrift
- Founded: July 11, 1885; 140 years ago in San Diego as San Diego Building and Loan Association
- Founders: Moses Luce, George Hensley
- Defunct: August 10, 1991; 34 years ago
- Fate: Seized by regulators when company became insolvent
- Successors: Wells Fargo; Bank One Arizona; First Interstate; Sterling Savings Bank; Washington Federal Savings
- Headquarters: San Diego, California, US
- Number of locations: 213 (at height in 1990)
- Areas served: California, Arizona, Washington, Montana, Colorado
- Products: Savings accounts, home mortgages

Great American Bank was an American savings and loan association based in San Diego. It was founded in 1885 as San Diego Building and Loan Association, the first savings and loan in Southern California. Until the 1980s, it operated as San Diego Federal Savings and Loan Association. Federal regulators seized and disbanded the bank in 1991. Before the company was split apart, Great American had more than 200 offices operating in California, Arizona, Washington, Montana, and Colorado.

== History ==
San Diego Building and Loan Association was founded on July 11, 1885. Its initial capital stock was $500,000 from 2,500 shares at $200 each. The company changed from a state charter to a federal charter in 1936, when it became San Diego Federal Savings and Loan Association. It began a stretch of eight mergers with other S&Ls starting in December 1980, during which it changed its name to Great American Federal Savings and Loan Association in 1982. The name change reflected their business going from four offices in San Diego County in 1970 to over 100 statewide after the completed mergers. It changed back from a federal to a state charter in 1984, when it changed its name to Great American First Savings Bank.

During the 1970s and 1980s, Great American experienced rapid growth largely due to acquisitions, and some considered it "the place to work" in San Diego. The bank also supported numerous civic causes.

Great American was positioned for growth after its public stock offering in 1983 and $60 million debt offering the year after. It expanded for the first time outside the state of California by the acquisition of Home Federal Savings of Tucson, Arizona, at the peak of a speculative real estate boom in the state in 1986. In March 1987, the company expanded into the state of Colorado through the acquisition of the insolvent two-office First Security Savings & Loan Association of Grand Junction, Colorado. In October 1987, Great American expanded into the Pacific Northwest through the acquisition of Capital Savings Bank of Olympia, Washington. At the time of the acquisition, Capital had 35 offices in Washington state and 5 offices in Montana.

After purchasing the naming rights from Great American Bancorp of Century City for $2.1 million, it changed its name to Great American Bank in 1987. In August 1988, Great American got out of the credit card business by selling its credit card division with its 188,000 Visa, Visa Gold, Mastercard and Gold Mastercard accounts to Household Bank N.A. of Salinas, a subsidiary of Household International, for an undisclosed amount.

By 1990, Great American had a large portfolio of bad loans and fell below its regulatory capital requirements. The bank sold its core of 130 California branches in a two-phase sale to Wells Fargo for $491 million before federal regulators seized the bank with its remaining 81 branches in August 1991. In May 1994, the Resolution Trust Corporation sold 58 Arizona branches to Banc One, 15 in Washington to First Interstate Bancorp, five in Washington to Sterling Financial Corporation, and two in Arizona to Washington Federal Savings while closing the remaining offices in its care.

Great American's decision to stray away from home loans into commercial real estate and out-of-state investments (most notably in Arizona) has been cited as a reason for its decline over time.

== See also ==
- List of largest U.S. bank failures
