= Herts Brothers =

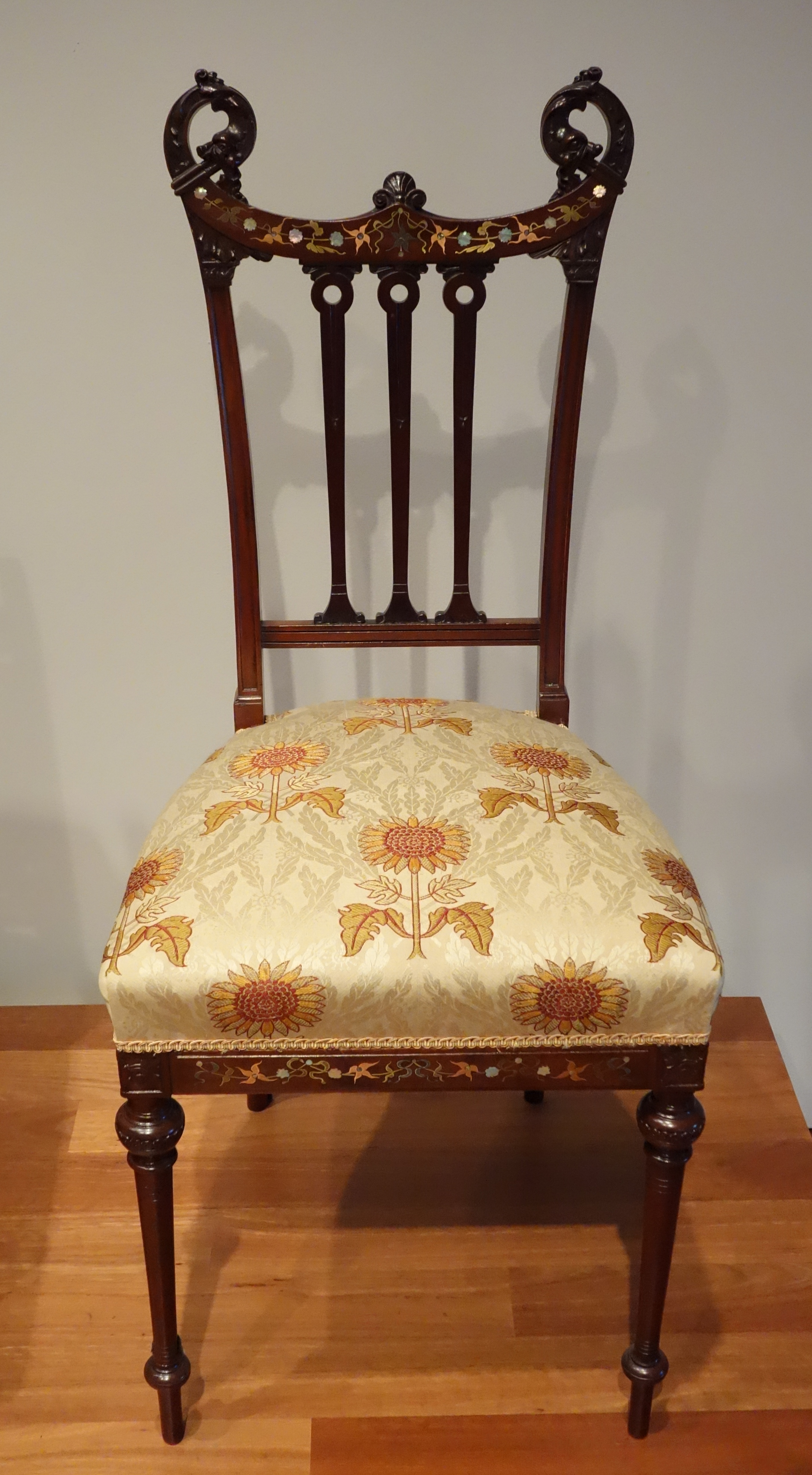
Side chair, attributed to Herts Brothers, New York, c. 1885-1890

The Herts Brothers were furniture designers and interior decorators, active in New York City from about 1876 to 1908. Their furniture is now collected by museums ranging from the Brooklyn Museum to the De Young Museum in San Francisco.

The company was founded in or before 1876 by brothers Benjamin H. Herts and Isaac H. Herts, sons of Henry B. Herts, an English-born antiques dealer and auctioneer. Their furniture showroom was located at 896 Broadway and later 20 West 57th Street, with a factory located on West 19th Street, and later a six-story brick building at 104 and 106 East 32nd street.

Over the course of three decades, they furnished a number of important buildings in New York City including the New York Produce Exchange, the Columbia Bank, and the Union Square Savings Bank; hotels including The Knickerbocker Hotel (Manhattan) and the St. Regis; social clubs including the Criterion Club, Progress Club, and Colonial Club; and the yachts of William Backhouse Astor Jr., and other clients.

Herts Brothers was active in two major expositions. Their exhibit at the 1876 Centennial Exposition in Philadelphia displayed a bedroom scene with canopy bed, dresser, tables, settees, curtains, portraits on the walls, and a mirror. At the World's Columbian Exposition in Chicago in 1893, the Herts Brothers won the highest award in their category for their Louis XV room at the Manufacturers Building.

The company filed for bankruptcy in 1908, but apparently re-emerged by 1916 with Benjamin's son, Benjamin Russell Herts, as president, with the elder Benjamin serving as treasurer and Isaac as vice president. Isaac died in 1918 and his brother Benjamin in 1924.
