= Husky Stadium =

Football stadium of the Washington Huskies

- The Greatest Setting in College Football
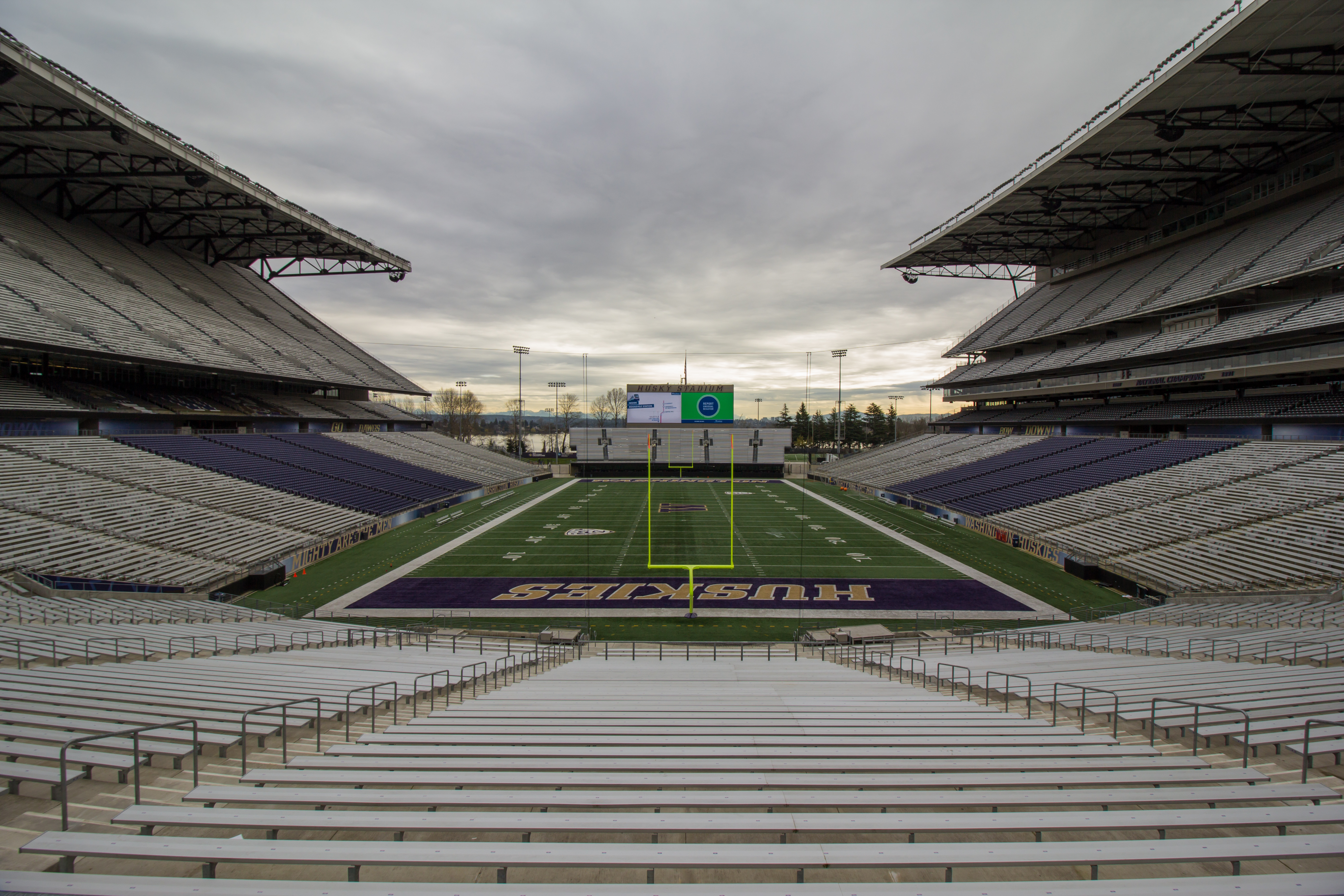
- Stadium grandstands and field as seen in 2016

- Location in the United States Location in Washington
- Interactive map of Husky Stadium
- Address: 3800 Montlake Blvd NE
- Location: University of Washington; Seattle, Washington, U.S.
- Coordinates: 47.6503°N 122.3016°W
- Operator: University of Washington
- Capacity: 72,132 Former capacity: List: 70,083 (2014); 70,138 (2013); 72,500 (1987–2011); 58,000 (1968–1986); 55,000 (1950–1967); 40,000 (1936–1949); 30,000 (1920–1935)
- Surface: AstroTurf 3D3 (2021–present); FieldTurf (2000–2021); AstroTurf (1968–1999); Natural grass (1938–1967); Dirt (1920–1937)
- Public transit: University of Washington

Construction
- Groundbreaking: May 17, 1920
- Opened: November 27, 1920; August 31, 2013
- Renovated: 1950, 1987, 2013
- Expanded: 1936, 1950, 1968, 1987
- Cost: $600,000 ($9.64 million in 2025) $280 million (2013 renovation)
- Architects: Bebb and Gould; 360 Architecture (2012 renovation)
- General contractor: Puget Sound Bridge and Dredging Company

Tenants
- Washington Huskies (NCAA) (1920–2011, 2013–present); Seattle Seahawks (NFL) (1994, 2000–2001)

Website
- ghuskies.com/stadium

Husky Stadium is an outdoor football stadium on the campus of the University of Washington in Seattle, Washington, United States. It has been home to the Washington Huskies of the Big Ten Conference since 1920, hosting their football games. Originally named University of Washington Stadium, it was renamed Husky Stadium following the 1970 football season. Husky Stadium also briefly hosted the Seattle Seahawks of the National Football League for part of the 1994 season while the Kingdome was being repaired and again in 2000 and 2001 while Qwest Field (now Lumen Field) was being constructed. In November 2026, it was announced that, beginning January 1, 2027, it would be known as Columbia Bank Stadium.

Aside from football, the university holds its annual commencement at the stadium each June. It has a capacity of 72,132 spectators and is situated at the southeast corner of campus, between Montlake Boulevard Northeast and Union Bay, just north of the Montlake Cut. The stadium is served by the University of Washington Link light rail station and several major bus routes.

The stadium underwent a $280 million renovation that was completed in 2013. Its U-shaped design was specifically oriented (18.167° south of due east) to minimize glare from the early afternoon sun in the athletes' eyes. The stadium's open end overlooks Lake Washington and the Cascade Mountains, including Mount Rainier. Prior to the 2013 renovation, its total capacity of 72,500 made it the largest stadium in the Pacific Northwest and one of the largest college football stadiums.

Renowned for its loudness, Husky Stadium holds the record as the loudest college football stadium ever recorded.

== History ==
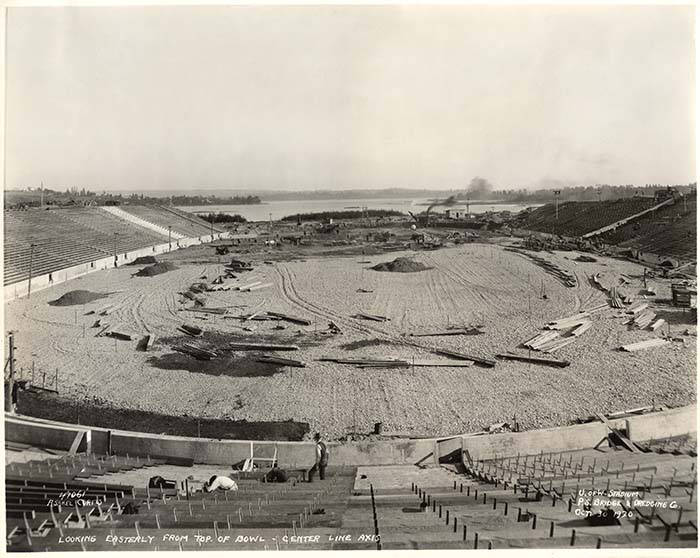
The stadium under construction in 1920

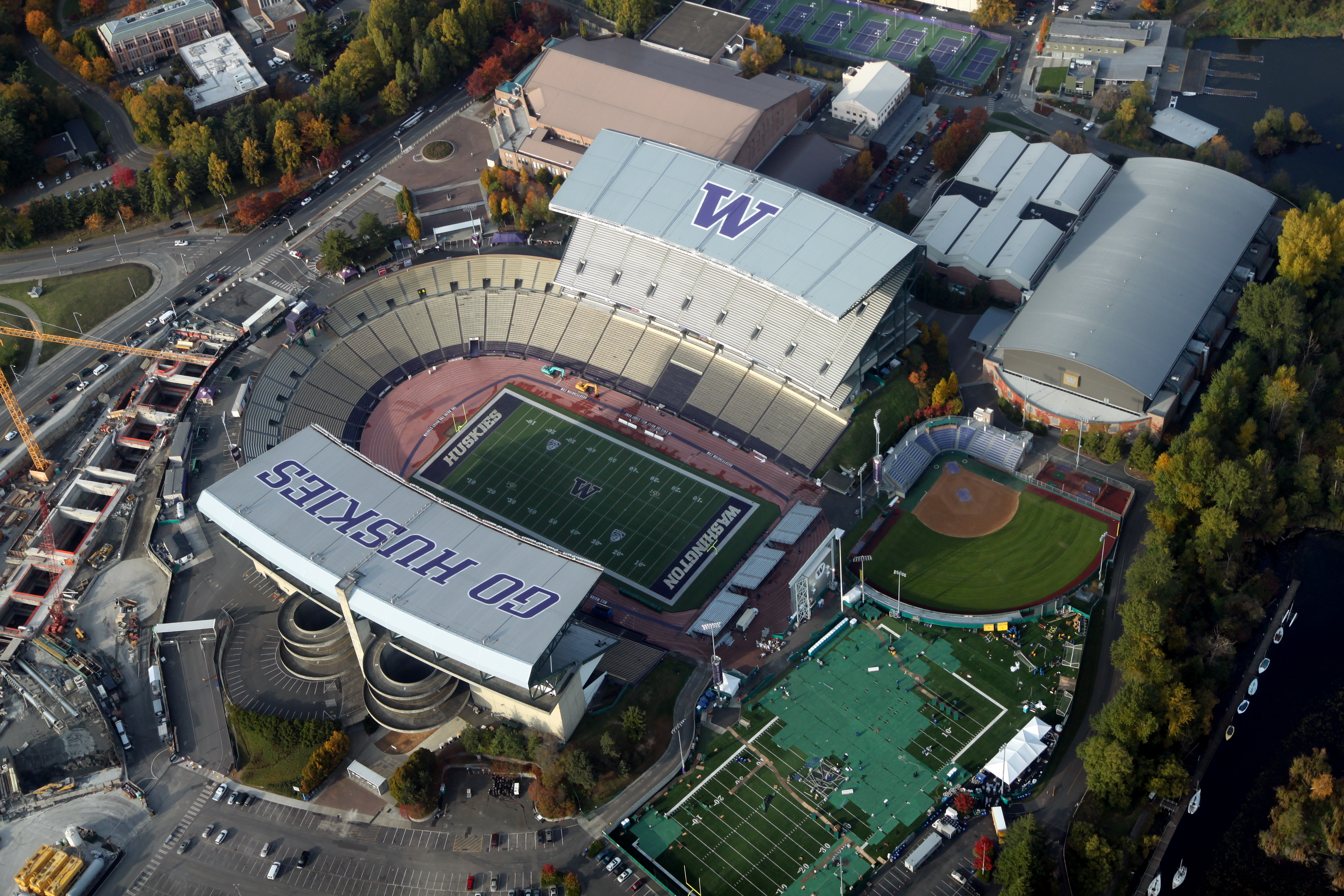
An aerial view of Husky Stadium as seen the day before the start of the 2011 renovation project. "Go Huskies" and the "W" logo were painted on the north and south decks in September 2008.

The original stadium was built in 1920 by Puget Sound Bridge and Dredging Company with a seating capacity of 30,000. It replaced Denny Field, located at the north end of campus, south of NE 45th St. and 20th Ave NE. Husky Stadium's first game was the concluding game of the 1920 season, a 28–7 loss to Dartmouth on November 27. On July 27, 1923, the stadium was the site of President Warren G. Harding's final public address; he died in San Francisco six days later.

The capacity of the lower bowl was expanded with the addition of 10,000 seats around the rim in 1936. In 1943, 35,000 people watched a demonstration of a mock WWII bombing raid, showing how local forces would respond in an attack. The Seattle fire department and emergency response teams rescued mock victims and buildings constructed on the field that were exploded as P-38 planes flew overhead to demonstrate how citizens should react. The first of the stadium's iconic covered grandstands was constructed in 1950, adding 15,000 seats to the south side. Several thousand additional seats were added in 1968.

In 1987, 13,000 seats were added with the construction of the north grandstand. Similar to the south stand, this structure included a cantilevered steel roof covering a portion of the lower seats. The project made headlines on February 25, 1987, when the grandstand collapsed during construction as a result of miscommunication between the workers and the contractor, which led to the premature removal during the intended replacement of several support cables. Although there were no casualties, property damage ranged from $500,000 to $1 million and resulted in setbacks; however, the stadium addition was completed in time for the start of the 1987 Husky football season.

Husky Stadium was a primary venue for the 1990 Goodwill Games, where the crowd saw an address by former President Ronald Reagan, as well as an address by Arnold Schwarzenegger, and a performance by the Moody Blues & Gorky Park. The stadium hosted the opening and closing ceremonies, as well as the track & field competition.

Husky Stadium was the temporary home of the Seattle Seahawks for five games (two preseason and three regular season) in 1994 while the Kingdome was temporarily closed for repairs to its damaged roof. The Seahawks replaced the playing surface and made other improvements to Husky stadium in preparation for its tenure as an NFL venue. A larger scoreboard debuted in 1998, with a 23-by-42-foot (7.0 m × 12.8 m) "HuskyTron" video screen. Improved lighting for television, including corner lights, was added in 1999, and official NFL goalposts (optic yellow, 40 ft (12.2 m) in height) were installed in 2000. After the demolition of the Kingdome in March 2000, the Seahawks played at Husky Stadium for the 2000 and 2001 seasons before moving into Seahawks Stadium (now Lumen Field) in 2002.

The Washington Interscholastic Activities Association (WIAA) will hold the Washington state championship games for high school football, called the Gridiron Classic, at Husky Stadium on a trial basis in December 2023. Announced by the WIAA in June, it will mark the return of the annual games to Seattle, which last hosted them at the Kingdome in 1994; the university granted significantly discounted venue fees for the WIAA, with the latter hoping for a long-term agreement if the games are successfully held. The games were previously rotated among three Pierce County high school venues after the WIAA elected to move them out of the Tacoma Dome in 2019 amid rising costs and impaired sight lines from the latter's 2018 renovations.

=== 2011–2013 renovation ===
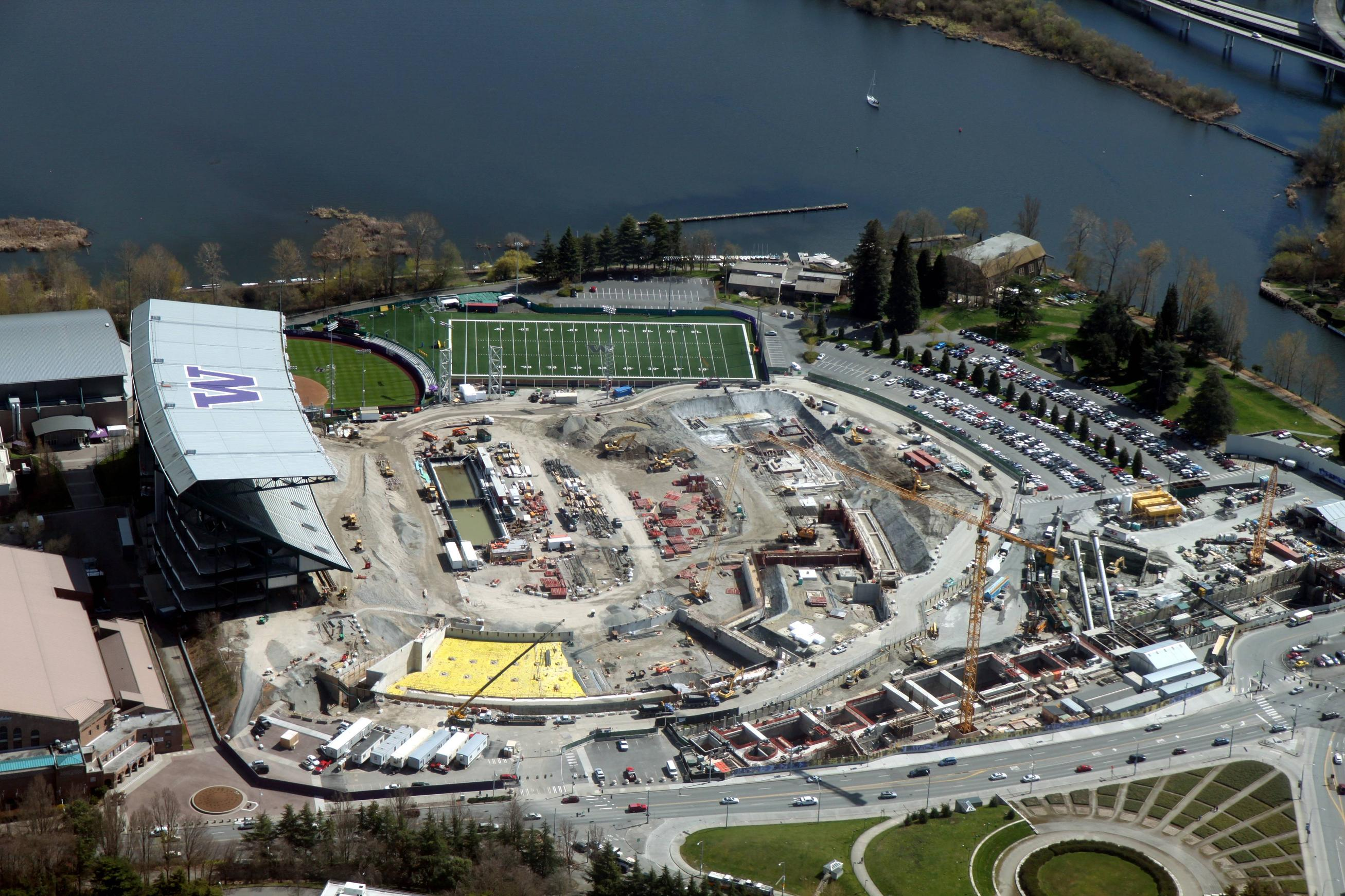
Renovation in April 2012

Photo from student section in West endzone during Husky game in September 2019

Husky Stadium had developed numerous structural problems over the years as a result of standing for nine decades in Seattle's moist weather, particularly in the lower bowl. In November 2011, Husky Stadium began a $261 million renovation, the largest single capital project in the university's history. Home games were played at CenturyLink Field during the 2012 season while construction took place. The Apple Cup in 2011 was moved to CenturyLink (Qwest Field through 2011, now Lumen Field) to advance the start of the project by several weeks.

The new Husky Stadium was developed by Wright Runstad & Company, designed by 360 Architecture, and constructed by Turner Construction company. The steel decking was supplied by Profile Steel. The new stadium is the first and primary income source of a completely remodeled athletic district which includes a new $19 million Husky Ballpark, a new track and field stadium, renovated soccer stadium, $50 million basketball operations and practice facility and recently completed projects such as the Husky Legends Center, the Conibear Shellhouse and Alaska Airlines Arena renovations, and the construction of the Dempsey Indoor facility. This major remodel of the athletic village coincided with construction for an underground station for a northern extension of the Link light rail system and a replacement of the Evergreen Point Floating Bridge.

The renovation project incorporated a new grand concourse, press box, video and audio system, and football offices, as well as new and improved amenities, concession stands, and bathrooms. The track that had enclosed the playing field was removed, and the field itself lowered by four feet to make room for additional seating closer to the sidelines. The student section was relocated from the north sideline to the west end zone, and the temporary bleachers in the east end zone were replaced with a permanent structure featuring field-level suites. The addition of box suites reduced the seating capacity from 72,500 to 70,138. Despite the reduction in capacity, the renovated stadium is expected to be as loud as its predecessor. Additionally, new parking garages were constructed and facilities throughout the athletic village were renovated.

From 2015 to 2026, Alaska Airlines owned naming rights to the field, which was officially known as "Alaska Airlines Field at Husky Stadium." The agreement, worth $41 million over 10 years, became the largest of its kind in college athletics. The airline declined to renew the agreement upon its expiration, although it continued to partner with UW athletics overall. On November 12, 2026, it was announced that Columbia Bank bought the naming rights to rename the stadium Columbia Bank Stadium starting in 2027.

== Surface ==
The playing field at Husky Stadium was originally dirt, which was then replaced with natural grass in 1938. In 1968, Washington became one of the first major college teams to play on AstroTurf at home; at the time, the Houston Astrodome, Neyland Stadium in Knoxville, Tennessee, and Camp Randall Stadium in Madison, Wisconsin, were the only other major facilities with artificial turf. The AstroTurf field was replaced in 1972, 1977, 1987, and 1995.

FieldTurf, a new variation of synthetic turf, was installed in 2000 at a cost of $1,074,958. The new turf features enhanced drainage and reduced abrasion through the use of synthetic fibers that are tufted into an infill of sand and rubber. The project was funded by Seattle Seahawks owner Paul Allen, who used Husky Stadium as a temporary home venue during the construction of Lumen Field. The first of its kind in the NFL, the surface was so popular with the players that the Seahawks, who had planned to use natural grass at their new stadium, instead installed their own FieldTurf surface. The FieldTurf at Husky Stadium was replaced with a newer one after nine seasons in 2009 at a cost of $350,000. Another replacement was completed in 2013 as part of the stadium's major renovations. Husky Stadium returned to AstroTurf in 2021, using the RootZone 3DM system; the surface was then replaced again in 2026.

The Husky Stadium end zones were painted gold during the 1980s and early 1990s; the new AstroTurf in 1995 changed them to purple. They became natural green with the installation of FieldTurf in 2000, which lasted until 2009 when they reverted to gold for one season. Purple end zones returned prior to the 2010 season, and were temporarily painted black for the Huskies' first "blackout" game against UCLA on November 18.

== Culture ==
=== The Wave ===
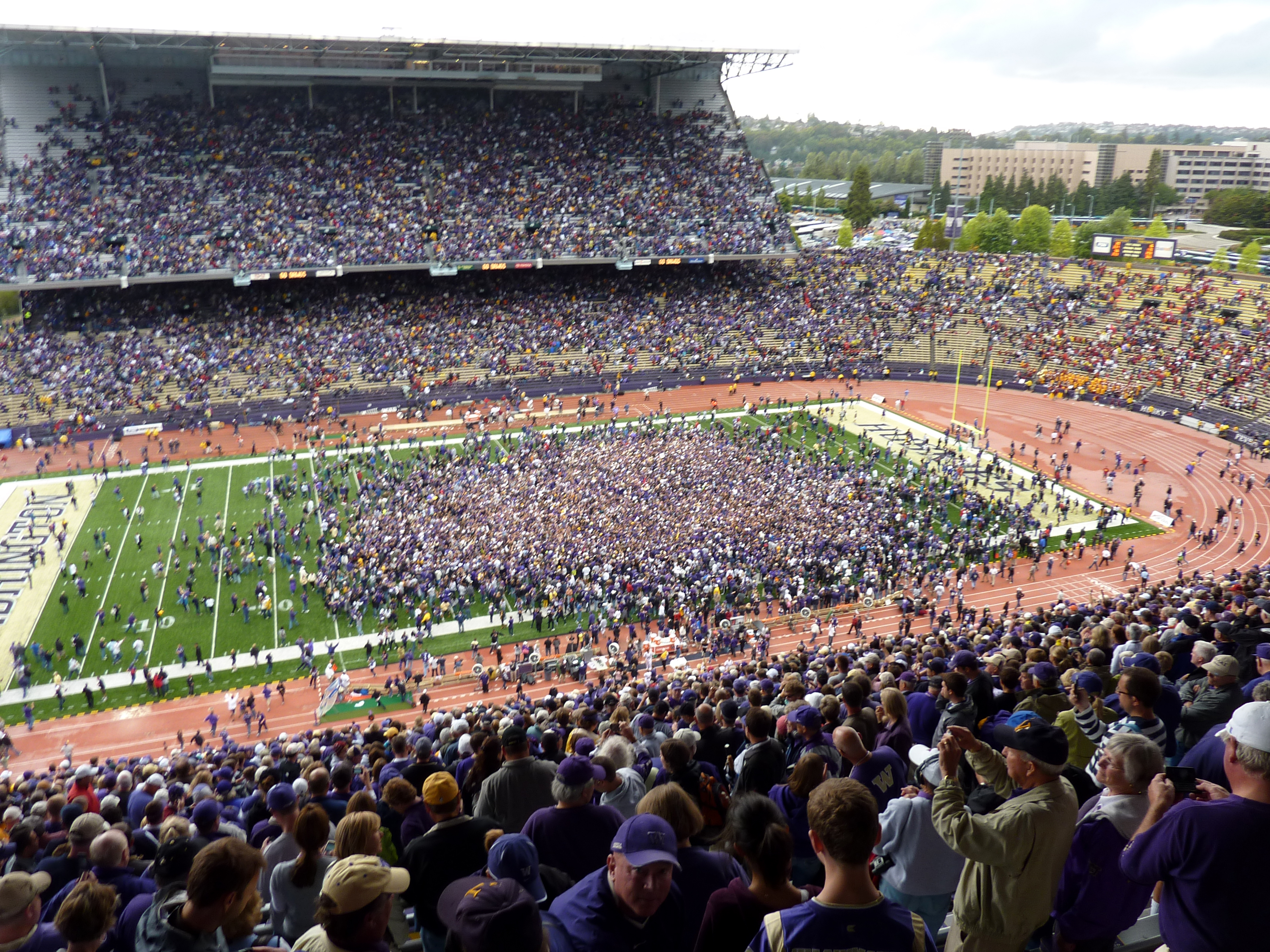
Ecstatic Washington Huskies college football fans storm the field at Husky Stadium in celebration after defeating the heavily favored No. 3 USC Trojans in a 2009 upset

Many claim that the first audience wave originated in Husky Stadium on Halloween 1981, at the prompting of Husky band trumpeter Dave Hunter, although it is documented to have begun at the Oakland Coliseum two weeks earlier during an MLB playoff game. Contrary to Hunter's account, former Washington yell leader Robb Weller has also claimed credit for the first wave. Weller was the guest yell-king during the Huskies' homecoming football game against Stanford. His initial concept for the wave was for it to travel vertically, from the bottom of the stands to the top, within the Husky student section. When the stunt was met with limited interest, he then decided to reverse the movement of the wave to travel from top to bottom. This failed miserably, as it was necessary to turn backward to see the wave progressing downward. Weller then gave up and returned his attention to the game. However, a fan named Omar Parker sitting on the open (east) end of the stadium at the student side started yelling "sideways". Weller did not hear him, but then many students tried to initiate a "sideways" wave on their own. After a few attempts, and more yelling of "sideways" by students, Weller took notice. He instructed the crowd to stand as he ran past. He moved along the track toward the open end of the stadium, explaining to the student crowd what he would do, then ran along the track toward the closed end of the stadium, in front of the student section. The stunt caught on after a couple of tries and continued around the entire stadium, and was then repeated throughout the rest of the game and the season. Longtime UW band director Bill Bissell also claimed co-creator credit with Weller, suggesting that the wave was devised by both of them prior to the game. The following week Bill Scott (known as "Bill the Beer Man") started the wave in Husky Stadium and also at the Seattle Seahawks game in the Kingdome.

=== Loudness ===
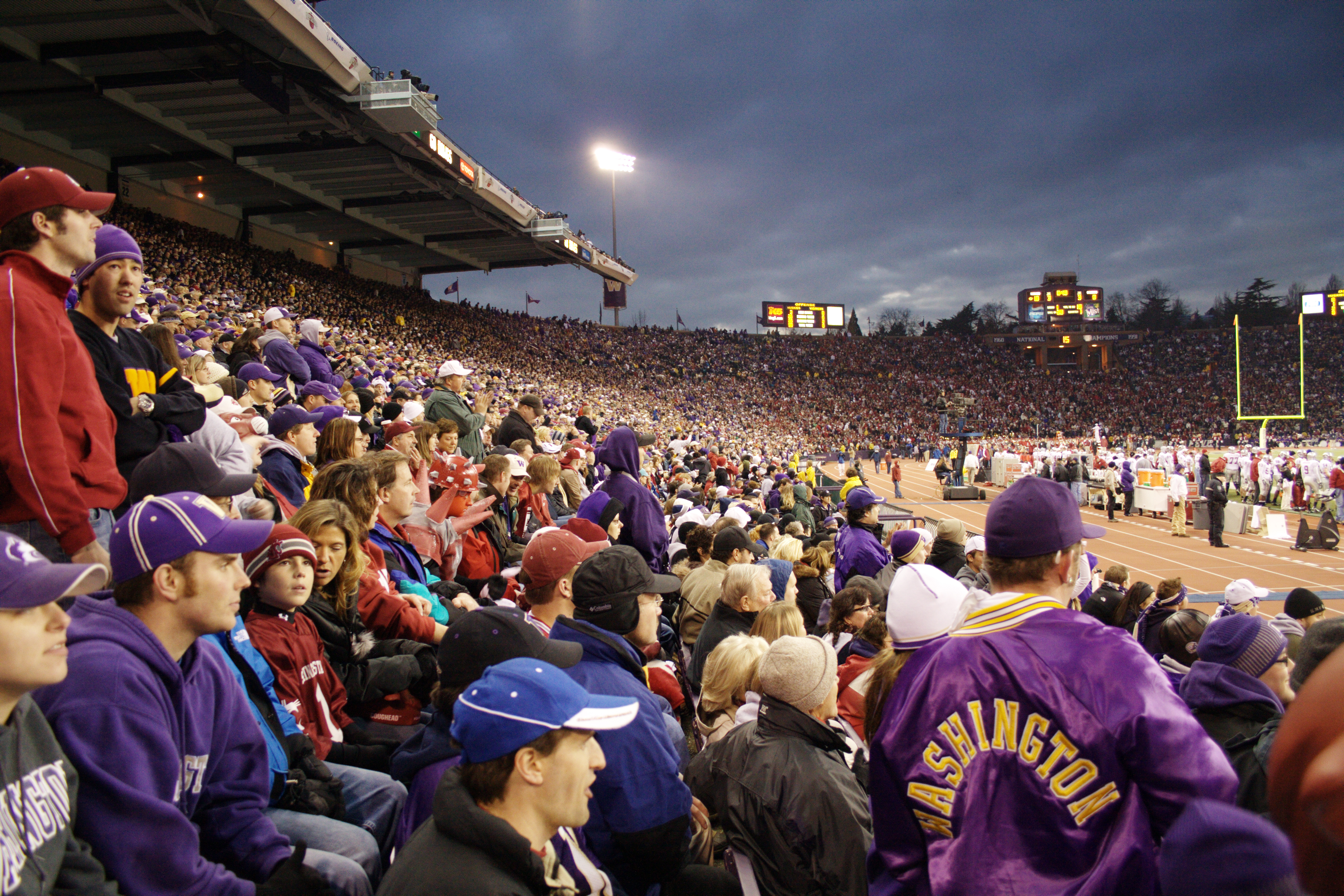
Capacity crowd in the south stands at the 100th Apple Cup in 2007

Husky Stadium has long been recognized as one of the loudest stadiums in the nation. This is in part due to the stadium's design; almost 70% of the seats are located between the end zones, covered by cantilevered metal roofs that trap the sound.

On occasion, the high decibel levels at Husky games along with fans stomping their feet in the bleachers cause television cameras to shake. During the night game against #12 Nebraska on September 19, 1992, ESPN measured the noise level at over 130 decibels, well above the threshold of pain. The maximum recorded level of 133.6 decibels, according to ESPN, is the highest ever recorded at a college football stadium.

=== Tailgating ===
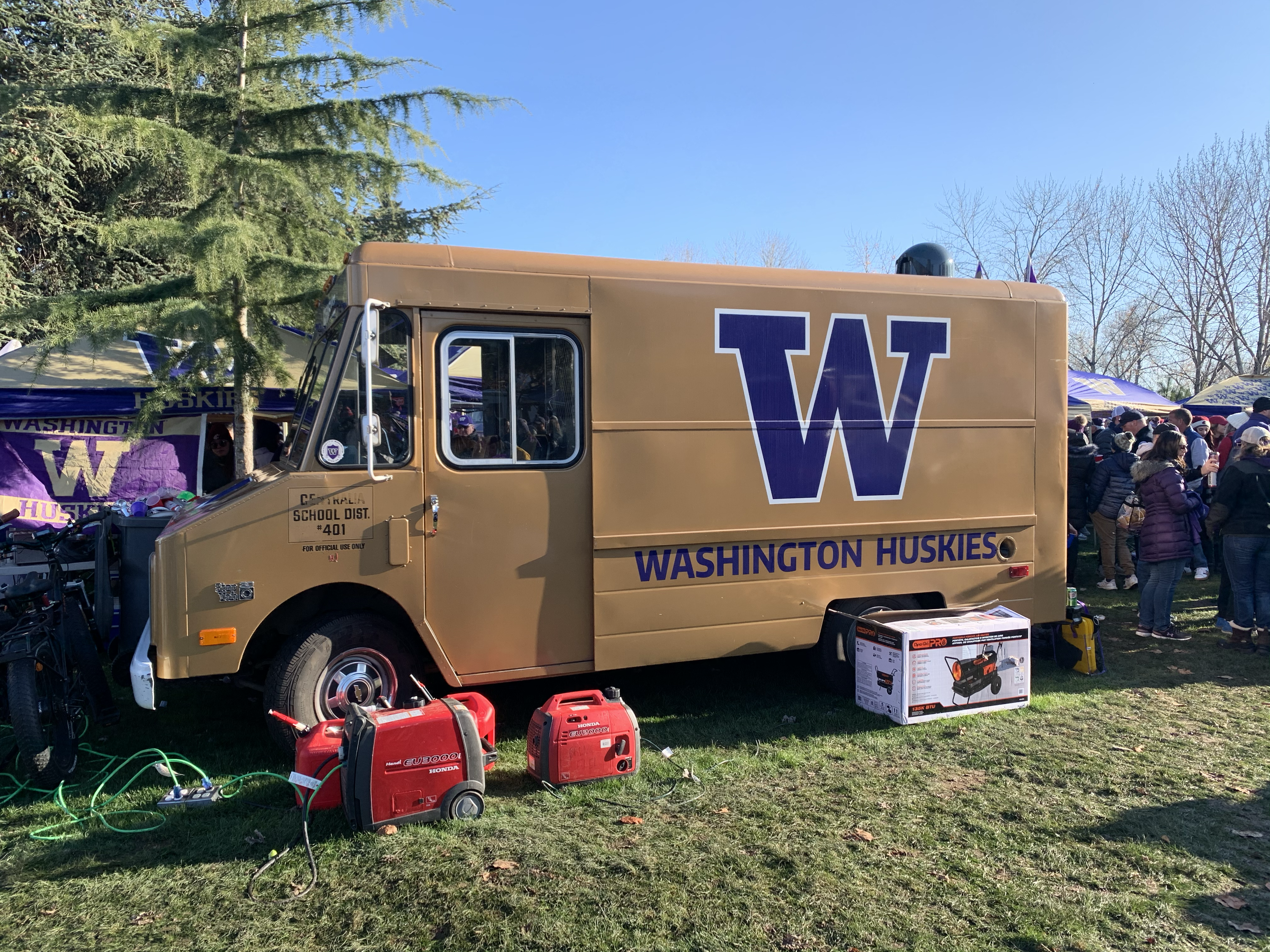
Tailgating at Husky Stadium prior to the 2019 Apple Cup

The north and south parking lots are packed with cars for tailgating. Husky Stadium is unusual in that fans can travel to football games by boat, known locally as "sailgating" (other stadiums with this feature include Neyland Stadium at Tennessee, Heinz Field at Pittsburgh, and McLane Stadium at Baylor). There can be upwards of 12,000 people out on Lake Washington next to Husky Stadium during game days. Before kickoff, the Washington crew team offers shuttles to anyone that wants to go to and from the boats and docks for the game.

Fans also gather at the Dempsey Indoor Facility just north of the stadium for Husky Huddles. After the game, the Tyee Sports Council and the University of Washington Athletic Department put on events where fans can gather and hear analysis of the game from Washington coaches and Husky Legends, and listen to the Husky Marching Band.

== NFL exhibition games ==
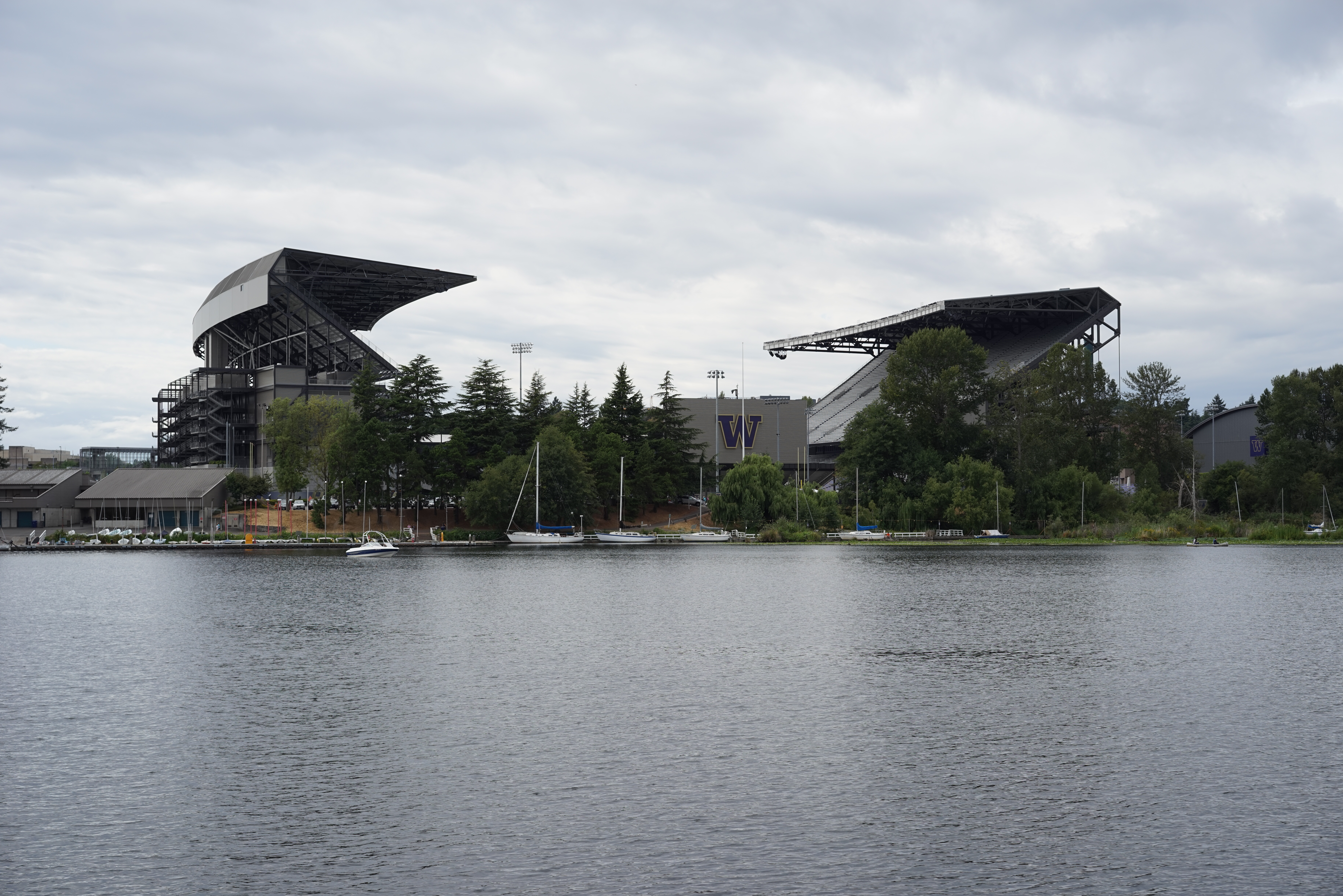
Looking west from Union Bay in 2015

Before the arrival of the Seattle Seahawks in 1976, Husky Stadium hosted 12 NFL preseason games between 1955 and 1975. The San Francisco 49ers played six times at the stadium, the most of any team. Other teams to make multiple appearances include the New York Giants, Los Angeles Rams, Cleveland Browns, and Chicago/St. Louis Cardinals.

At one point after the 1970 NFL season, Ralph Wilson came close to moving the Buffalo Bills from dilapidated War Memorial Stadium to Husky Stadium. The threat of relocation prompted the developers in the Buffalo suburbs to construct Rich Stadium in Orchard Park (later Ralph Wilson Stadium and now Highmark Stadium), which opened in 1973. The Bills have resided there ever since.

== Other sports ==
Husky Stadium was among several local venues considered as a potential temporary home for a Major League Soccer team in the mid-1990s. The University of Washington offered to let a prospective team, including the Seattle Sounders, use the stadium for two years if a plan to build a permanent soccer stadium was in place. Husky Stadium was also considered as a potential 1994 FIFA World Cup venue, but lacked a suitable grass surface; it was also a candidate venue in the unsuccessful U.S. bid for the 2022 FIFA World Cup alongside Qwest Field.

== See also ==
- List of NCAA Division I FBS football stadiums
- Lists of stadiums

Preceded by The Kingdome; The Kingdome	Home of the Seattle Seahawks; First half of 1994; 2000 – 2001	Succeeded by The Kingdome; Seahawks Stadium
