= NVB =

NVB may refer to:

- Najat Vallaud-Belkacem (born 1977), French politician
- National tariff system (Netherlands), in public transport (Dutch: Nationale vervoerbewijzen)
- Nederlandse Volksbeweging, a Dutch political reform movement (1945–1951)
- Neurovascular bundle, in biology
- North Valley Bancorp, an American bank (1972–2014)
