= Umpqua Holdings Corporation =

Former American bank based in Oregon

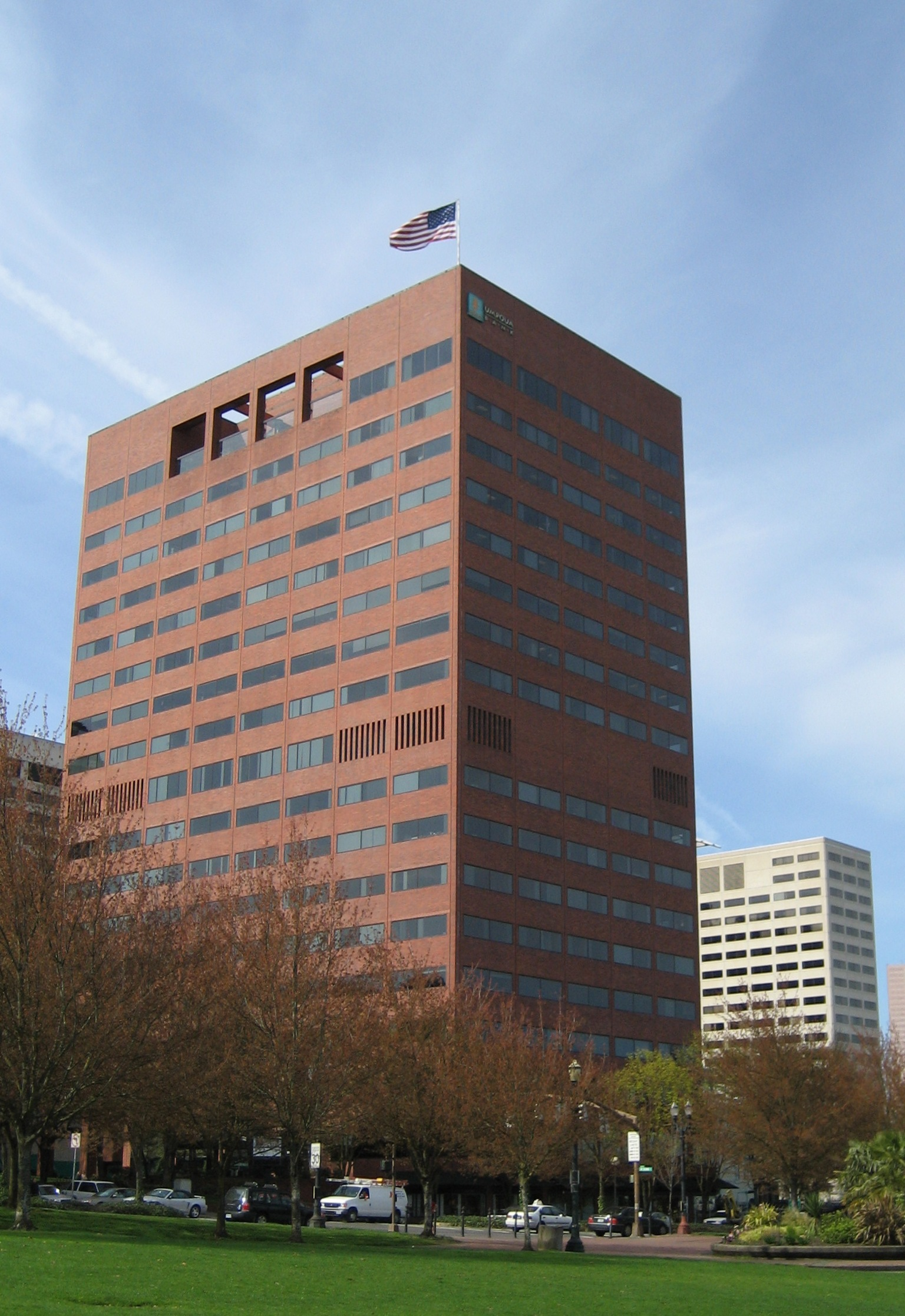
- Umpqua Bank's headquarters, Umpqua Bank Plaza in Portland, Oregon
- Formerly: South Umpqua State Bank (1953–1998); South Umpqua Bank (1998–2000)
- Type: Subsidiary
- Traded as: Nasdaq: UMPQ
- Industry: Commercial Banks
- Founded: November 9, 1953; 72 years ago
- Defunct: March 1, 2023; 3 years ago (as an independent bank); September 1, 2025; 13 months ago (as a brand)
- Fate: Merged with Columbia Banking System
- Successor: Columbia Bank
- Headquarters: Bank: Canyonville, Oregon (1953–1972); Roseburg, Oregon (1972–2023); Holding Company: Portland, Oregon; 45°30′47″N 122°40′31″W
- Number of locations: 350
- Key people: Peggy Fowler (Chair); Cort O'Haver (CEO)
- Products: Checking accounts Savings accounts Retirement accounts Home loans Personal investing Private bank Business loans Treasury management Merchant services
- Revenue: ▲US$871.6 million (2015)
- Operating income: ▲US$253.3 million (2015)
- Net income: ▲US$222.5 million (2015)
- Number of employees: 4,491 (December 31, 2015)
- Parent: Columbia Banking System, Inc. (2023–2025)
- Website: https://www.umpquabank.com

Umpqua Holdings Corporation, d.b.a. Umpqua Bank, was a financial holding company based in downtown Portland, Oregon, United States. Headquarters were in the Umpqua Bank Plaza, formerly the headquarters of Benj. Franklin Savings and Loan. The firm had two principal operating subsidiaries: Umpqua Bank (the Bank) and Umpqua Investments (formerly Strand, Atkinson, Williams and York (Investments)).

The company’s main operating segments were personal banking and lending, business banking and lending, and wealth management. The bank serves consumers and businesses in the community. As of 2015, Umpqua Bank had $24 billion in assets and $18 billion in deposits and was ranked among the largest 60 banks in the nation. Its parent company, Umpqua Holdings, was publicly traded. As of 2016, Umpqua Bank was the largest Oregon-based bank and had 350 branches in Oregon, Washington, California, Nevada and Idaho.

In October 2021, Umpqua announced it was merging with Tacoma-based Columbia Bank. Umpqua Bank branches would transition to the Columbia name and branding. The combined holdings company would be based in Tacoma, with the bank operational headquarters based in the Portland area.

== History ==
South Umpqua State Bank was formed in 1953, in Canyonville, Oregon, with six employees. It was started by a group of people working in the timber business who wanted to create a means for the employees to cash their payroll checks. The bank opened with capital of $50,000 and surplus and reserves of $25,000. The bank’s first savings account was opened by Pete Duchene, a local business agent. D.B. “Tex” Ritter and his wife Nadine opened the first commercial account for their South Umpqua Trucking Company.

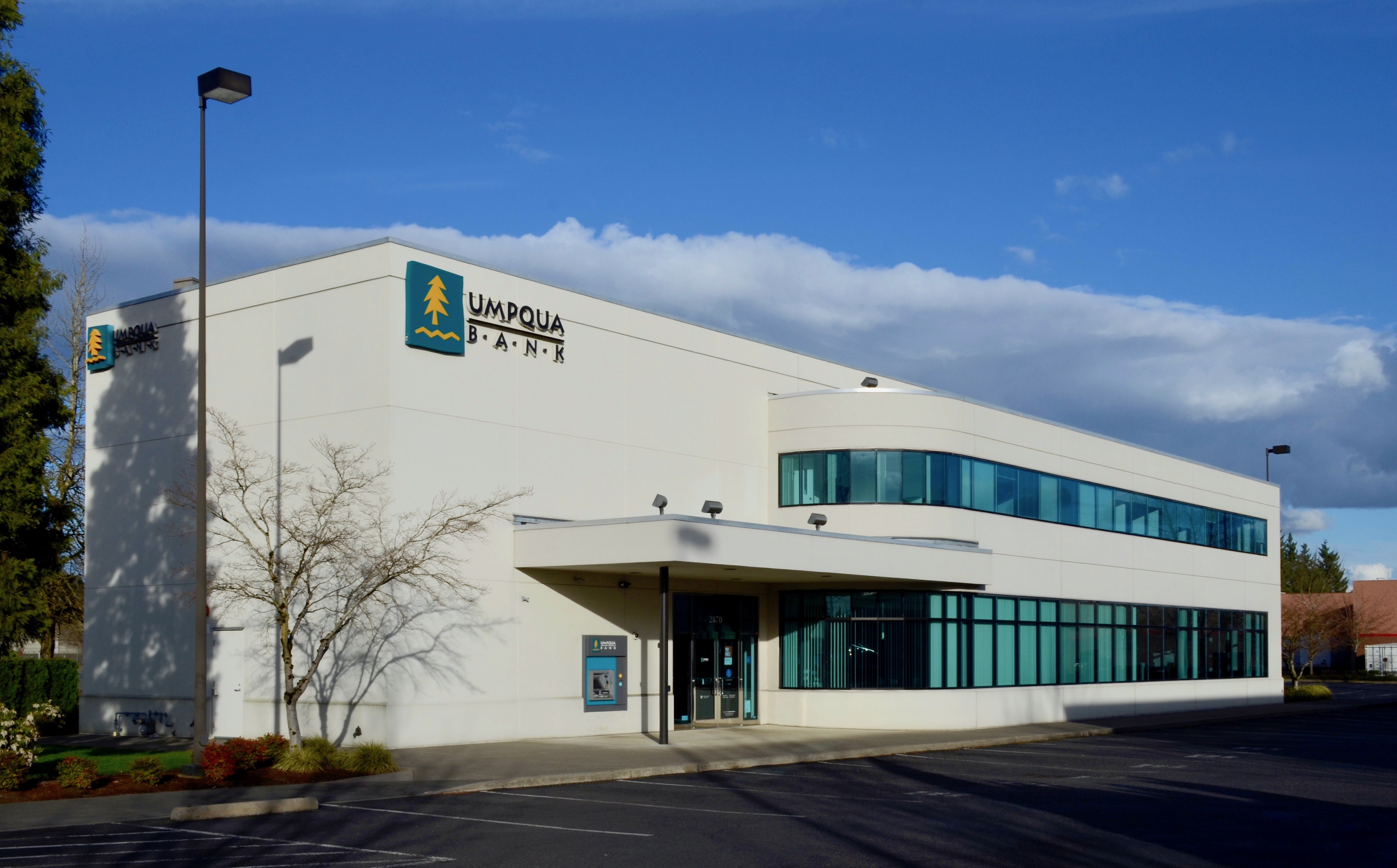
An Umpqua Bank branch in Hillsboro, Oregon

In 2002, Umpqua increased its number of branches to 63 by acquiring Centennial Bancorp of Eugene, Oregon, for $214 million. On January 16, 2009, Umpqua agreed to assume the deposits of Vancouver, Washington-based Bank of Clark County after the latter bank was closed by the Washington Department of Financial Institutions. Umpqua agreed to assume the deposits of Seattle, Washington-based Evergreen Bank in January 2010 after the latter was closed by the Washington Department of Financial Institutions and the Federal Deposit Insurance Corporation (FDIC) was appointed receiver. A month later the company agreed to take over the deposits of Tacoma, Washington-based Rainier Pacific Bank after it was closed by state regulators. The acquisition, completed on February 26, 2010 under a purchase and assumption agreement with the FDIC, added Rainier Pacific's $718 million in assets and $446 million in deposits.

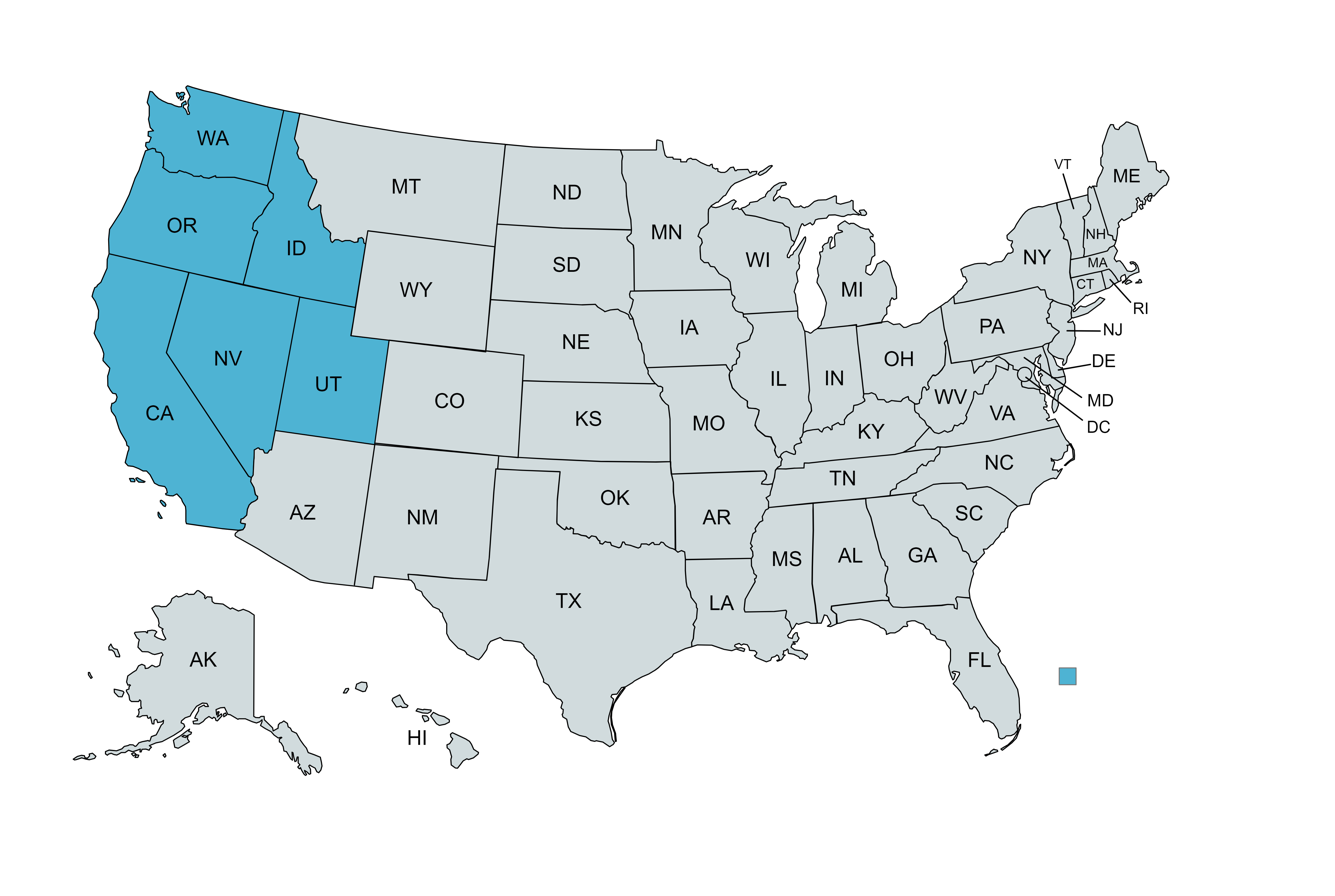
States with Umpqua Bank locations

Umpqua continued with acquisitions in 2012 when they attempted to buy California-based American Perspective Bank for $44.7 million, which would have added two branches to Umpqua's then 196 branches. The deal fell through, however, when Umpqua was outbid; American Perspective paid Umpqua a $1.6 million fee to terminate the deal. Umpqua had been expanding into the San Francisco Bay Area and closed a $24.9 million deal to buy Bay Area-based Circle Bancorp in November 2012.

In September 2013, Umpqua announced it would buy Sterling Financial Corporation, parent of Sterling Bank, the second largest bank in Washington. The $2 billion deal closed in April 2014 and increased the number of bank branches to 394 and increased assets to $22 billion.

Former CEO and President of Umpqua Holdings Corporation Raymond Davis took over the local 40-person South Umpqua Bank in 1994. Davis became CEO and President of Umpqua Holdings in 1999. In 2007, Davis authored a book titled Leading for Growth: How Umpqua Bank Got Cool and Created a Culture of Greatness. Cort O’Haver became President in April 2016, with Davis retaining the role of CEO. Davis stepped down as CEO in January 2017. O’Haver took over as CEO at that point while Davis became executive chair of the bank's board and continued to oversee Pivotus Ventures Inc. until his formal retirement, which was announced In late December 2017 and effective January 2, 2018.

In late February 2023, Columbia Banking System and Umpqua Holdings officially closed their merger combining banking operations, with more than $52 billion in assets. The bank now operates as Umpqua Bank. The holding company, Columbia Banking System, Inc., trades on the Nasdaq under the ticker symbol 'COLB.'

== See also ==
- List of companies based in Oregon
