= Benj. Franklin Savings and Loan =

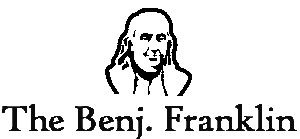
- Type: Public
- Industry: Banking
- Founded: 1925
- Defunct: 1990
- Fate: Seized during the savings and loan crisis
- Headquarters: Portland, Oregon, USA

Benj. Franklin Savings and Loan was a thrift based in Portland, in the U.S. state of Oregon. Founded in 1925, the company was seized by the United States Government in 1990. In 1996 the United States Supreme Court found that this and similar seizures were based on an unconstitutional provision of the Financial Institutions Reform, Recovery, and Enforcement Act of 1989 (FIRREA). Shareholders of the thrift sued the federal government for damages caused by the seizure, with the shareholders winning several rounds in the courts. In 2013, $9.5 million was allocated for disbursement to shareholders.

== History ==
Benj. Franklin S&L's television commercials featured its president, Bob Hazen, in which he hawked toasters and other free gifts to woo new depositors and to pitch other financial products and services. Hazen is credited with inventing the thrift marketing phrase: "Pay Yourself First."

Hazen's father founded the Benj. Franklin in 1925. Although the name on signs and letterhead was "Benj." in promotions and discussions, the full word "Benjamin" was always pronounced.

Between 1982 and 1989 the thrift made a profit in 16 consecutive calendar quarters and became the number one mortgage lender in the Portland metropolitan area. It had strong lending positions in other major areas of the Northwest.

== Headquarters ==
Their named headquarters building was 1 SW Columbia, in Portland, Oregon. A 30-story 1980s brick-veneer office building, fronting on the Willamette River near the Hawthorne and Marquam Bridges, the building still stands as the Umpqua Bank Plaza, headquarters of Umpqua Holdings Corporation.

Hazen was a fan of cast-iron architecture, a technique popular in the 19th century to early 20th century. He had collected castings from a great many, as the old buildings were torn down over the years by developers. Several of these iron fronts were incorporated into the executive level and board room of the building.

== Seeds of the seizure ==
In 1982 the entire industry was on the verge of bankruptcy, as was the Federal Deposit Insurance Corporation and the Federal Savings and Loan Insurance Corporation (FSLIC), the government agencies that insured banks and thrifts to protect the depositors. Interest rates on savings deposits were over 15% at a time when the industry was invested in long-term mortgages charging about 8%.

When regulators seize a bank or a thrift, they find a healthy bank or thrift to "acquire" the assets, liabilities and customers of the failing enterprise. There are various incentives, including an accounting strategy that values the negative net worth of the failing thrift as a capital asset of "Goodwill" to the acquiring thrift. These were called "Supervisory Goodwill Agreements". The acquiring thrift was allowed to show this "Goodwill" as an asset for regulatory compliance purposes, depreciating (writing it down) over a long period of years. "Supervisory Goodwill" was also called "Blue Sky."

Absent "Blue Sky" most acquiring thrifts would be instantly out of compliance with regulatory capitalization requirements, so it was a necessary component of most forced mergers.

In 1982, Benj. Franklin was asked by the FSLIC to acquire a failing thrift, Equitable Savings and Loan. The agreement with the government included a 40-year amortization of over $340 million in "Supervisory Goodwill" ($644 million in 2008 dollars). Benj. Franklin and the government made a similar agreement in 1985 concerning the acquisition of Western Heritage Savings and Loan. These agreements had the full approval of the Federal Home Loan Bank Board.

== Scandals and FIRREA ==
In the middle of the S&L crisis of the late 1980s; the officers of several thrifts were accused and later convicted of defrauding investors and depositors. In 1989 Congress passed FIRREA. Critics suggest that FIRREA was a hasty reaction to the frauds and scandals that actually exacerbated the S&L problem, from crisis to a true disaster. Among its controversial provisions, FIRREA retroactively revoked agreements for the long-term amortization of goodwill.

The US Constitution prohibits "Ex Post Facto" laws (making something illegal after it has happened). In 1996, the US Supreme Court found that this clause applied to the retroactive aspects of FIRREA.

== Seizure ==
In late 1989 regulators notified Benj. Franklin that the $330 million in "Supervisory Goodwill Agreement" phantom capital from the Equitable S&L merger must be removed from the balance sheets under the new FIRREA rules. Benj. Franklin was informed that unless it came up with a replacement for that $330 million in capital within about 90 days, it would be declared insolvent and seized.

The managers of Benj. Franklin pointed to the contract all had signed, and took the position that the new requirement to raise additional capital was a violation of that contract. They took the posture that they were in compliance and had a contract which defined compliance and did not need to come up with $330 million, roughly double the amount then held as capital.

Regulators declared Benj. Franklin insolvent and seized its assets on February 21, 1990, under protest. In September 1990, Bank of America acquired the thrift from the government. In August 2013, it was announced shareholders would receive $9.5 million, or $1.23 per share, in a disbursement of the company's assets.

== Lawsuit ==
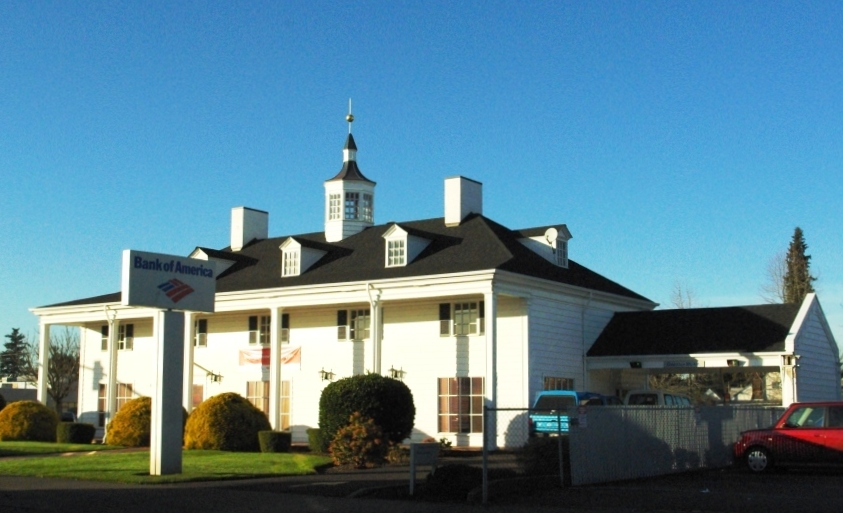
Former branch in downtown Hillsboro, Oregon, now a branch of Bank of America. This neo-colonial architecture was intended to communicate stability.

- In 1990 shareholders sued the government for breach of contract. They've won in every contest so far.
- In 1995, it was ruled that these shareholders had the right to bring suit "shareholder standing".
- In 1996, the U.S. Supreme Court ruled in a companion case that the government had breached its contract for long term amortization of goodwill.
- In 1997, a judge decided that the government breached its contract with Benj. granting "summary judgment on liability." Summary judgment means no trial was needed.

Trial on the issue of how much damages should be awarded started in January 1999, and finished in September 1999. Government experts testified that the damages to Benj. due to the seizure was zero. Experts testified that the value of Benj. Franklin at the time of the 1999 trial if it had not been seized would have been $944,000,000.

== See also ==
- List of companies based in Oregon
