= Pacific Premier Bancorp =

Bank: Holding company

Pacific Premier Bank
- Formerly: Life Savings and Loan Institution (1983–1985); Life Savings Bank (1985–1997); Life Bank (1997–2002)
- Traded as: Nasdaq: PPBI
- Industry: Financial services
- Founded: August 5, 1983; 43 years ago
- Defunct: September 2, 2025; 13 months ago
- Fate: Acquired by Columbia Banking System
- Successor: Columbia Bank
- Headquarters: San Bernardino, California (1983–2006); Costa Mesa, California (2006–2012); Irvine, California (2012–2025)
- Number of locations: 57 (2025)
- Net income: ▲US$158.8 million (2024)
- Total assets: ▼US$17.90 billion (2024)
- Total equity: ▲US$2.96 billion (2024)
- Number of employees: 1,325 FTE (2024)
- Website: www.columbiabank.com/ppbi

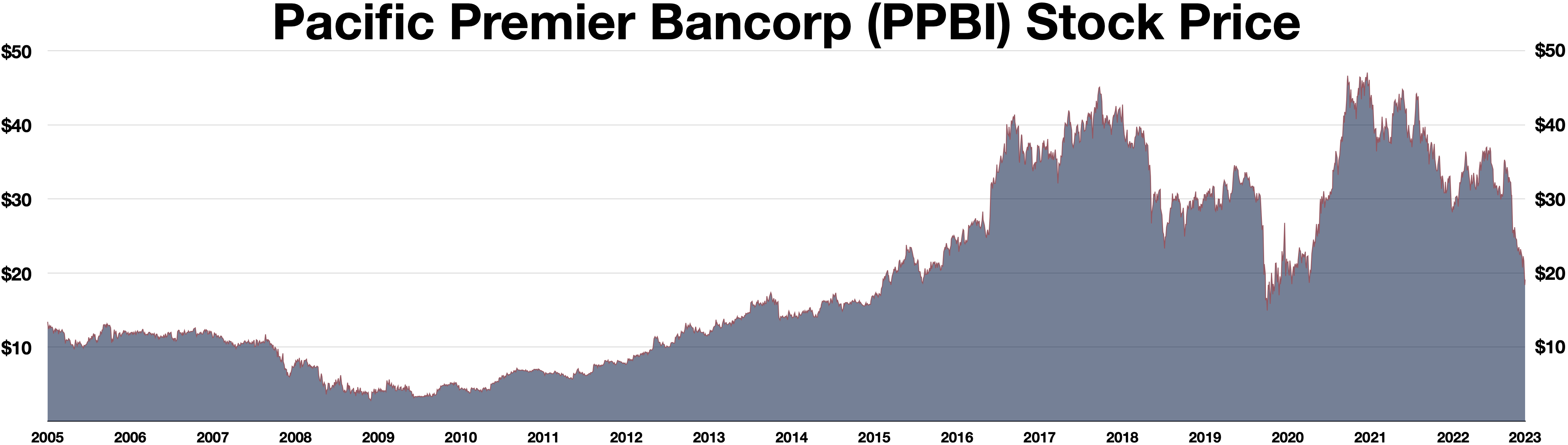
Pacific Premier Bancorp (PPBI) stock price

Pacific Premier Bancorp, Inc. was an American bank holding company under the Bank Holding Company Act of 1956 headquartered in Irvine, California, US. Its principal business focused on Pacific Premier Bank, which offers a range of financial services to individuals, businesses, and professionals. The bank operated numerous branches in California, Arizona, Nevada, and Washington.

Pacific Premier Bank also offered commercial escrow services and facilitates 1031 exchange transactions through its Commerce Escrow division.

== History ==
=== Foundation ===
Pacific Premier Bank was originated from Life Bank and founded in 1983.

In 1991, the bank became a federally chartered stock savings bank. In 1997 Pacific Premier Bancorp, Inc. was formed as a banking holding company.

In 2006, new depository branches were formed in Costa Mesa, Huntington Beach, and Los Alamitos. In 2007, the bank became a California-chartered commercial bank.

=== 2011-2020 Growth through acquisition ===
In 2011, Pacific Premier Bank completed the acquisition of Canyon National Bank. On April 27, 2012, the Company completed the acquisition of Palm Desert National Bank. On March 15, 2013, the company acquired First Associations Bank, a Texas-chartered bank headquartered in Dallas, Texas. On June 25, 2013, Pacific Premier Bancorp acquired San Diego Trust Bank.

On November 18, 2013, the company acquired Infinity Franchise Holdings with a price estimated to be approximately $16 million. In October 2014, it bought Independence Bank, located in Newport Beach, for $71.5 million.

In April 2017, the company bought Heritage Oaks Bancorp. In 2018, it acquired the holding company of Grandpoint Bank Grandpoint Capital, Regents Bank, and the Biltmore Bank of Arizona with approximately $3.2 billion in total assets.

In 2020, the bank bought Opus Bank with approximately $8 billion in total assets, along with its divisions PENSCO Trust Company (now Pacific Premier Trust) and Commerce Escrow.

On April 23, 2025, Columbia Banking System, Inc. entered into a definitive agreement to acquire Pacific Premier Bancorp. The acquisition was closed on Sept. 2, 2025.

== Sponsorship ==
Pacific Premier Bank has been a sponsor of the Los Angeles Chargers since 2017.
