= Umpqua Bank Plaza =

Skyscraper in Portland Oregon

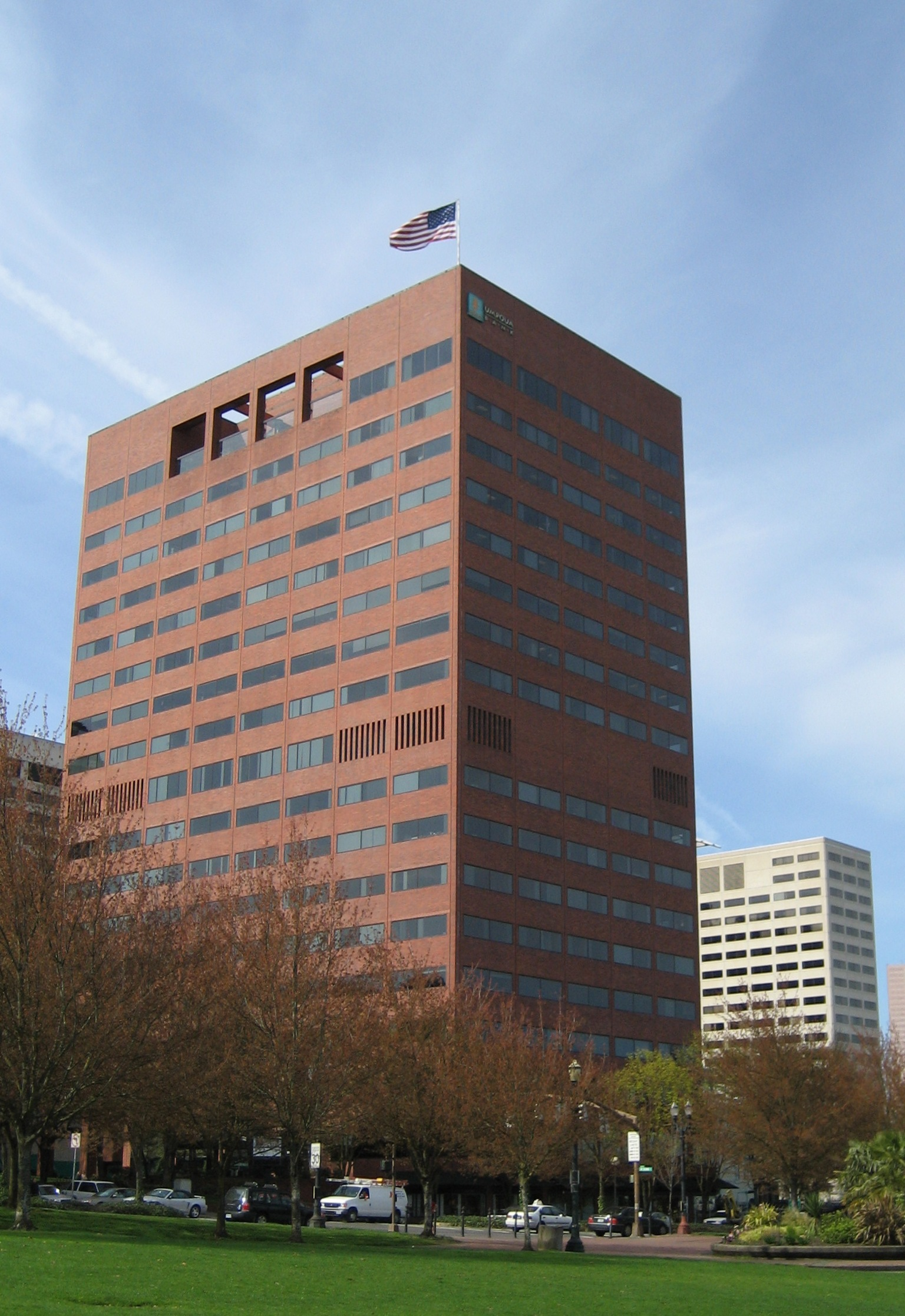
- Umpqua Bank Plaza from Waterfront Park

- Location within Portland, Oregon
- Former names: Benjamin Franklin Plaza

General information
- Type: Office
- Location: Downtown Portland, Oregon, United States
- Coordinates: 45.5133467°N 122.6752496°W
- Completed: 1974
- Opening: 1975
- Cost: US$16 million
- Owner: Zeller Realty Group

Height
- Roof: 263 feet (80 m)
- Top floor: 20

Technical details
- Floor count: 19
- Floor area: 265,000 square feet (24,600 m^{2})

Design and construction
- Architect: ZGF Architects

Umpqua Bank Plaza is a 19-story office building in Downtown Portland, Oregon, United States. Faced with red brick, the structure is 263 feet (80 m) tall and has 265,000 square feet (24,600 m^{2}) of space. Opened in 1975 at a cost of $16 million, the building was designed by Wolff, Zimmer, Gunsul, Frasca (now known as ZGF Architects). Originally named the Benjamin Franklin Plaza after tenant Benj. Franklin Savings and Loan, the building was later renamed after former tenant Umpqua Holdings Corporation.

== History ==
Construction began in 1974 on the 19-story structure, with plans to name it after a construction materials company that was to call it home. Construction ended in 1974 on the $16 million project, but the namesake suffered economic setbacks and did not move into the building, leaving it nameless. The building opened in 1975, and Benjamin Franklin Federal Savings and Loan Association moved their headquarters to the building and were able to get the building named as the Benjamin Franklin Plaza. When Benjamin Franklin moved into the 19th floor, cast iron pieces from the demolished Ladd Building were added as the CEO was a fan of the old look. Additionally, part of the stained-glass ceiling from the old Washington Hotel was on that floor housing the executive offices of the thrift.

In 1983, RREEF Funds purchased the building for about US$35 million. Benj. Franklin Savings & Loan was closed by the federal government in 1990 and liquidated, but the name of the building remained. Nichiei America Corporation, a subsidiary of Nichiei Co. Ltd., purchased the building in 1990 from RREEF Funds for $34 million. In 1997, the Plaza was remodeled at a cost of $2.7 million and won Office Building of the Year from the Building Owners and Managers Association of Portland. Sportswear company Fila opened a design office in the building in 1997.

In 1998, Spieker Properties bought the tower from Nichiei at a cost of $50 million. Spieker Properties later merged and became part of Equity Office Properties Trust. Following the attacks on the morning of September 11, 2001, the structure was one of many taller buildings to be temporarily closed to the public due to security concerns. Accounting firm Ernst & Young opened an office in the building in 2003.

Umpqua Bank became the Plaza's largest tenant in 2005 when it added more than 52,000 square feet (4,800 m^{2}) to its lease, where it already leased 12,000 square feet (1,100 m^{2}) for a bank branch and some offices. This led to the Benjamin Franklin Plaza being renamed as the Umpqua Bank Plaza on January 19, 2005. The bank's parent company, Umpqua Holdings Corporation, houses its headquarters in the building, though the bank is still headquartered in Roseburg in Southern Oregon.

In March 2007, Shorenstein Properties purchased the building, along with several others in Portland, from The Blackstone Group, which acquired them as part of its acquisition of EQ Office. Blackstone had acquired the same buildings when they purchased Equity Office Properties Trust. The building earned Gold Leadership in Energy and Environmental Design (LEED) certification from the U.S. Green Building Council in 2012 for its sustainability. Shorenstein sold the tower to Zeller Realty Group in January 2017 for $90 million.

== Details ==
The nineteen storey, Class A office space tower has 270,000 square feet (25,000 m^{2}) of leasable space. Rising 263 feet, the building was designed by Robert Frasca of Portland architecture firm Zimmer Gunsul Frasca Partnership. The office building was the first high-rise for the firm and has a red brick exterior. These were Willamina brick incorporated into prefabricated panels, and this was the last instance of this brick being used in a Portland building.

Located at One southwest Columbia Street, it is across the street from Tom McCall Waterfront Park and is bounded by Columbia, Jefferson, First, and Naito Parkway on the southern end of downtown. The building includes a 200 space underground parking structure and a rooftop terrace. Around the base of the tower are landscaped plazas and a gazebo. Internal numbering at the skyscraper omits the thirteenth floor.

== See also ==
- List of tallest buildings in Portland, Oregon
