= Peggy Fowler =

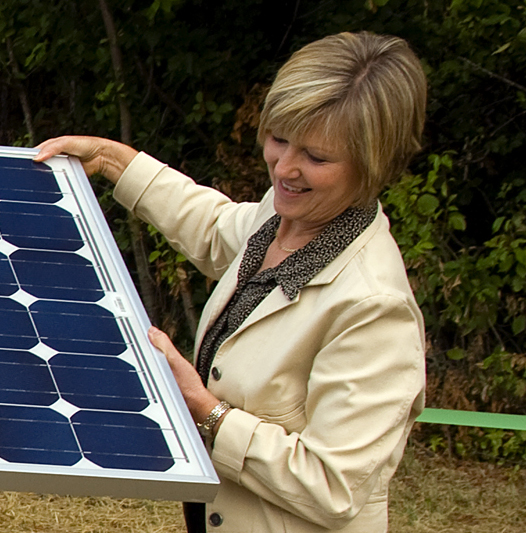
- Fowler in 2008
- Born: Peggy Y. Fowler; July 14, 1951 (age 75); Nampa, Idaho, United States
- Education: George Fox University; University of Michigan; University of Idaho
- Occupation: Business executive
- Spouse: Robert G. Fowler

Peggy Y. Fowler (born July 14, 1951) is an American businessperson in the state of Oregon. She was the chief executive officer (CEO) of Portland General Electric (PGE), and as of 2007 was the 11th highest-paid CEO in Oregon. A native of Idaho, she worked for PGE, a private electric utility, from 1974 to 2009.

== Early life ==
Peggy Fowler was born in Nampa, Idaho, on July 14, 1951. The daughter of a Quaker minister, J. Russell Stands and Frances Martin Stands, she grew up in Oregon, first in Portland. Fowler was the youngest of five children in the family, with the next oldest nine years older than she was. Growing up in a religious household, she did not watch TV at home until around age 10, and did not attend a movie until reaching college. From the age of two until five she wore an eye patch over her right eye and is legally blind in one eye. While in fifth grade the family moved from Portland to Hillsboro, Oregon, a suburb to the west. In school she excelled in math and played the flute, while hoping to become a scientist.

After high school Fowler attended George Fox College, a Quaker school in Newberg, Oregon. At college she majored in chemistry and mathematics. She graduated in 1973 with a degree in those subjects, and completed graduate work from the University of Michigan and the University of Idaho. She was married a first time at age 21, with a divorce resulting within a few years.

== Career ==
After college she began working for the Oregon Graduate Institute School of Science and Engineering, hoping to earn a Ph.D. at the school. In 1974, Fowler began working for Portland General Electric as a chemist, and began working her way up the management ladder, first as general manager of the company’s environmental and analytic services department. She was hired during the 1980s as the manager of PGE’s customer service department, located in Gresham, Oregon. She was the first female manager of that division that includes the line repair crews, meter reading, and billing.

Enron purchased PGE in 1997 and operated the company as a wholly owned subsidiary. In 1998, Fowler became a director with the company and worked as the chief operating officer, keeping that title until 2000. She was president of Enron’s Portland General Holdings corporation from 1999 to 2003 when it filed for bankruptcy. She was then named chairperson of the board for PGE in 2001, remaining in that position until early 2004. Fowler served as president of the company from 1998 to April 2000. In April 2000, Fowler was promoted to the position of chief executive officer at the company.

Fowler was named by the Portland Business Journal in 2005 as Oregon’s most admired CEO. In April 2006, PGE became its own company again when its stock began trading on the New York Stock Exchange. Fowler and seven other employees of the utility rang the opening bell at the stock exchange on April 10, 2006. In 2007, Fowler was paid by PGE a total of almost $2.3 million in compensation, making her the 11th highest paid CEO in Oregon, and the highest paid female CEO in the state. Fowler retired from the company in March 2009 and joined the board of directors where she stayed until May 2012. She joined the board of directors at Umpqua Holdings Corp. in 2009 and became chair of the board in 2012.

== Other ==
Peggy Fowler is married and has two stepchildren. She lives with her husband Robert in Tigard, Oregon. She is a board member of the Oregon Business Council, Oregon Independent College Foundation, and several regional healthcare organizations. She won the Utility Women’s Leadership Conference’s Leadership Award in 2000. In June 2007, she was appointed to the board of the Portland branch of the Federal Reserve Bank of San Francisco, and awarded the Portland First Citizen Award.
