= Sterling Financial Corporation =

Former American bank

- Industry: Banking
- Founded: 1983; 43 years ago
- Founder: Harold Gilkey
- Defunct: April 18, 2014; 12 years ago
- Fate: Acquired by Umpqua Holdings Corporation
- Headquarters: Spokane, Washington
- Number of locations: 173 (prior to 2014 acquisition)
- Areas served: Washington, Oregon, California, Idaho
- Key people: Leslie S. Biller, Chairman; J. Gregory Seibly, CEO, Ezra Eckhardt, President; Patrick J. Rusnak, CFO
- Revenue: ▼$0.379 billion (2013)
- Net income: ▼$0.093 billion (2013)
- Total assets: ▲$10.319 billion (2013)
- Total equity: ▼$1.215 billion (2013)
- Number of employees: 2,547
- Subsidiaries: Sterling Savings Bank (d.b.a. Argent Bank in California)
- Website: Last archive of official website

Sterling Financial Corporation was a bank holding company headquartered in Spokane, Washington. In 2014, the company was acquired by Umpqua Holdings Corporation.

The bank operated 173 branches in Washington, Oregon, California, Idaho.

== History ==
The company commenced operations in 1983.

In 1998, the company acquired 33 branches from KeyCorp.

In early 2004, Sterling finalized the acquisition of Klamath First Bancorp Inc. of Klamath Falls, Oregon.

In 2007, the company agreed to acquire North Valley Bancorp for $196 million in cash and stock, but the merger was cancelled after failing to win regulatory approval.

During the 2008 financial crisis, the company received a $303 million investment by the United States Department of the Treasury as part of the Troubled Asset Relief Program (TARP). The bank ultimately repaid the Treasury for all monies owned from TARP.

In October 2009, the company received a cease and desist order from regulators and initiated executive changes. In 2010, the company raised $730 million in capital to avoid being shut down by regulators. Thomas H. Lee Partners and Warburg Pincus each acquired a 22.6% stake in the company, along with more than 30 other investors.

In 2011, the company acquired Vancouver-based First Independent Bank.

In 2012, the company changed the name of its bank from Sterling Savings Bank to Sterling Bank and laid off 6% of its workforce.

In March 2013, the company acquired American Heritage Holdings for $6.5 million.

In May 2013, the company acquired the Seattle-area operations of Boston Private Bank & Trust Company.

On September 11, 2013, Umpqua Holdings Corporation announces it is acquiring Sterling Financial Corporation.

In October 2013, the company acquired Commerce National Bank of Newport Beach, California for $42.9 million.

In February 2014, the company sold 6 branches to Banner Bank.

On April 18, 2014, Umpqua Holdings Corporation acquired the company for $2 billion in cash and stock.
