= North Valley Bancorp =

- Industry: Banking
- Founded: 1972; 54 years ago
- Defunct: October 3, 2014; 11 years ago
- Fate: Acquired by Tri Counties Bank
- Headquarters: Redding, California
- Key people: Michael J. Cushman, CEO & President; Kevin R. Watson, CFO
- Revenue: ▼$32 million (2013)
- Net income: ▼$3 million (2013)
- Total assets: ▲$917 million (2013)
- Total equity: ▼$93 million (2013)
- Number of employees: 319

North Valley Bancorp was a bank holding company headquartered in Redding, California. The company operated 22 branches. The company was acquired by TriCo Bancshares in October 2014, in a merger valued at more than $178 million.

== History ==
In September 1972, North Valley Bank was established as a California-chartered bank. The company commenced operations in February 1973.

In 1980, North Valley Bancorp was incorporated as the holding company for North Valley Bank.

In 2000, the company acquired Six Rivers National Bank.

In September 2004, the company acquired Yolo Community Bank for $23 million.

In June 2006, the company merged its two subsidiary banks: North Valley Bank and NVB Business Bank.

In 2007, Sterling Financial Corporation agreed to acquire the company for $196 million in cash and stock, but the merger was cancelled after failing to win regulatory approval.

In October 2014, the company was acquired by Tri Counties Bank for $178.4 million in stock.
