= WaFd Bank =

Seattle-based bank

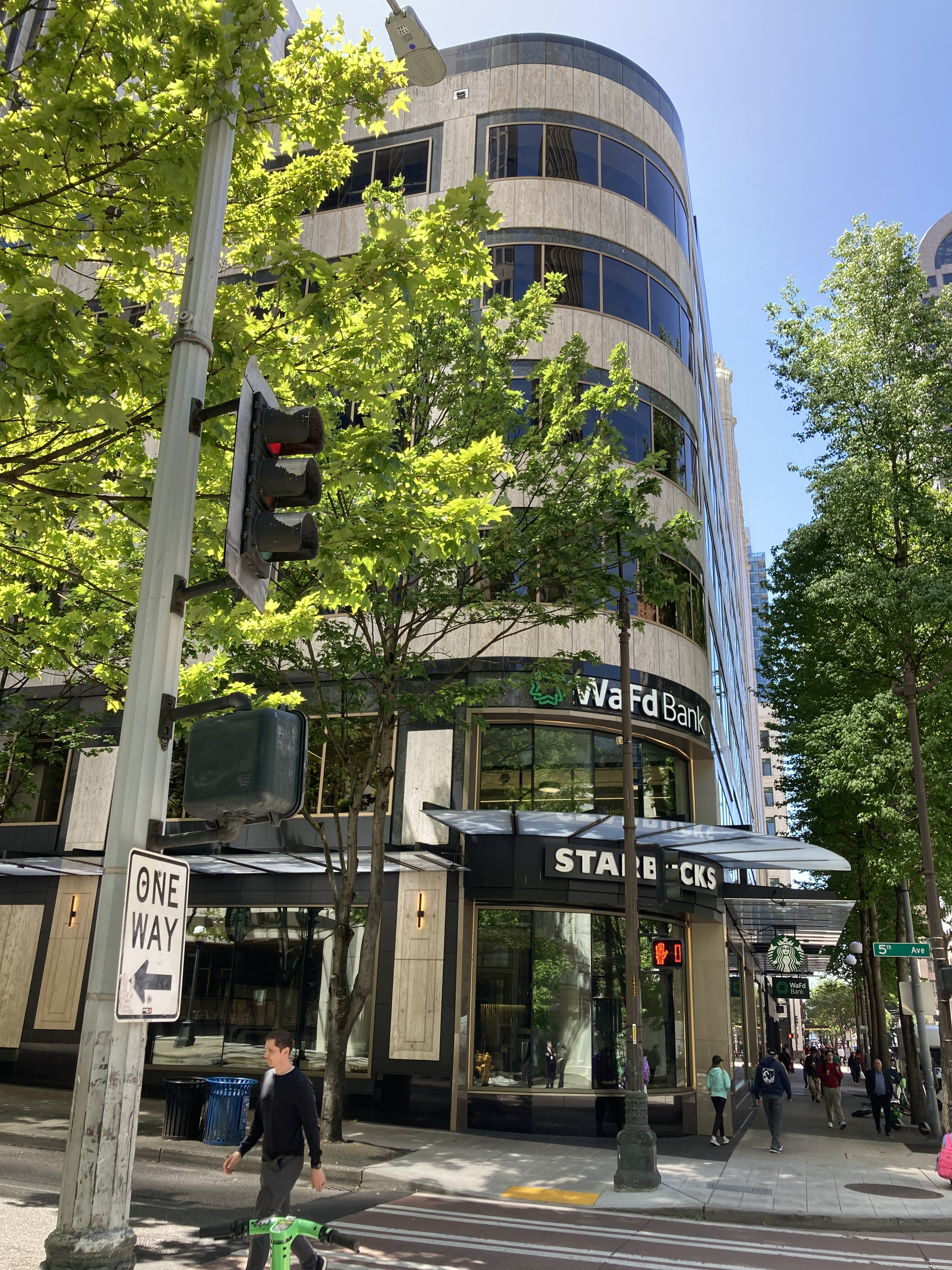
- WaFd Bank's headquarters in downtown Seattle
- Formerly: Washington Federal
- Type: Public
- Traded as: Nasdaq: WAFD; S&P 600 component
- Industry: Financial services
- Founded: January 1, 1917; 109 years ago
- Headquarters: Seattle, Washington, United States
- Number of locations: 210 (September 30, 2024)
- Area served: Washington, Oregon, Arizona, Idaho, Nevada, Utah, New Mexico, California, Texas
- Key people: Brent J. Beardall, President and Chief Executive Officer; Kelli Holz, Chief Financial Officer; Cathy Cooper, Chief Consumer Banker; Ryan Mauer, Chief Credit Officer; Kim Robison, Chief Operating Officer; James Endrizzi, Chief Commercial Banker
- Products: Consumer Banking, Corporate Banking, Insurance, Investment Banking, Mortgage loans, Private Banking, Private equity, Wealth management, Credit cards, Financial Analysis
- Net income: ▼US$ 200 million (September 30, 2024)
- Total assets: ▲US$ $26.252 billion (September 30, 2024)
- Total equity: ▼US$ $2.757 billion (September 30, 2024)
- Number of employees: 2,208 (September 30, 2024)
- Parent: WaFd, Inc.
- Website: www.wafdbank.com

WaFd Bank (formerly known as Washington Federal) is a regional bank based in Seattle, Washington. It operates 210 branches in Washington, Oregon, Idaho, Nevada, Utah, Arizona, New Mexico, California, and Texas. It is on the list of largest banks in the United States.

== History ==
The bank was founded on April 24, 1917 in Ballard, Washington as Ballard Savings and Loan by a group of businessmen. In 1958, it merged with Washington Federal Savings and Loan Association of Bothell. The bank took the name Washington Federal for "wider geographical acceptance".

The bank demutualized in 1982 and the present holding company structure was adopted in 1995.

In 2019, the bank was rebranded as WaFd Bank (pronounced Wah-Fed), a long-used nickname for the bank.

In January 2025, WaFd Bank announced it would exit mortgage lending after more than a century in the market, citing rising regulatory burdens and limited profitability, and refocus its business model on small business banking and commercial lending.

In September 2026, WaFd, Inc. announced an agreement to merge with EverBank Financial Corp. in a deal valued at approximately US$3.9 billion. The combined bank is expected to be led by Greg Seibly as chief executive officer and Brent Beardall as president, subject to completion of the transaction and regulatory approvals.

=== Acquisitions ===
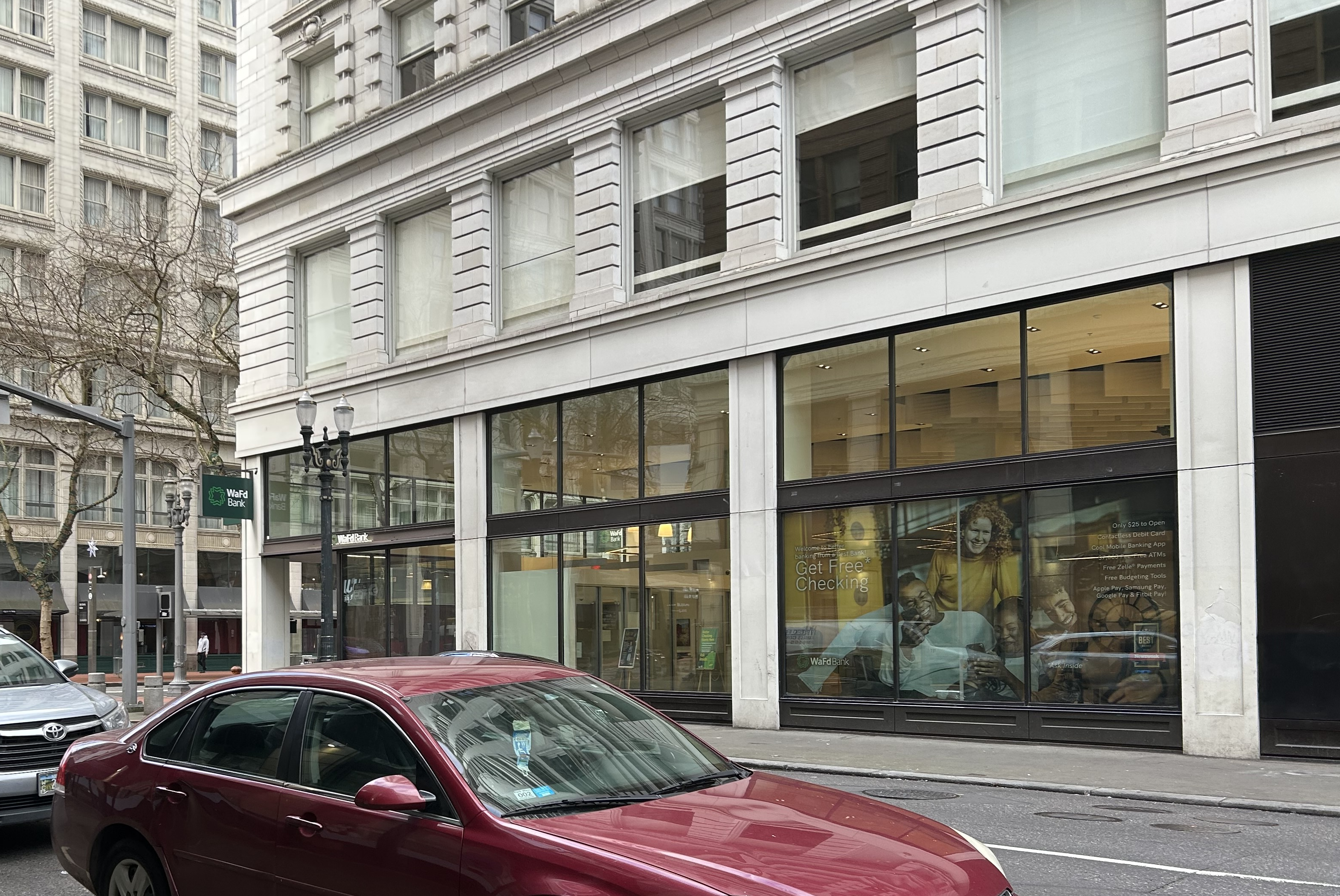
A WaFd Bank branch in Portland, Oregon

- Seattle Federal Savings and Loan, 1971
- First Federal Savings and Loan Association, Mount Vernon, Washington, 1978
- United First Federal, Boise, Idaho, 1987
- Provident Federal Savings and Loan, Boise, 1987
- Northwest Federal Savings and Loan, Boise, 1988
- Freedom Federal Savings and Loan, Corvallis, Oregon, 1988
- Family Federal Savings and Loan Association, Dallas, Oregon, 1990
- First Federal Savings and Loan Association, Idaho Falls, Idaho, 1991
- Metropolitan Savings Association, Portland and Eugene, Oregon, 1991
- First Federal Savings Bank, Salt Lake City, 1993
- West Coast Mutual Savings Bank, Centralia, Washington, 1996
- Metropolitan Bancorp, Seattle, November 29, 1996
- United Savings and Loan Bank (4 branches, based in Seattle) for $65 million in 2003. Founded on July 6, 1960, it was the first savings and loan owned by Asian Americans.
- First Mutual Bank, Bellevue, Washington, 2008
- Horizon Bank (18 branches), seized by the Federal Deposit Insurance Corporation after bank failure, Bellingham, Washington, 2010
- Charter Bank, 6 branches, Albuquerque, New Mexico, 2011
- South Valley Bancorp Inc., Klamath Falls, Oregon, 2012
- 51 branches from Bank of America in Washington, Oregon, Idaho, and New Mexico, 2013
- 23 branches from Bank of America in Arizona and Nevada, 2014
- Luther Burbank Savings in California and Washington, March 2024.
