= Columbia Bank =

American bank based in Tacoma, Washington

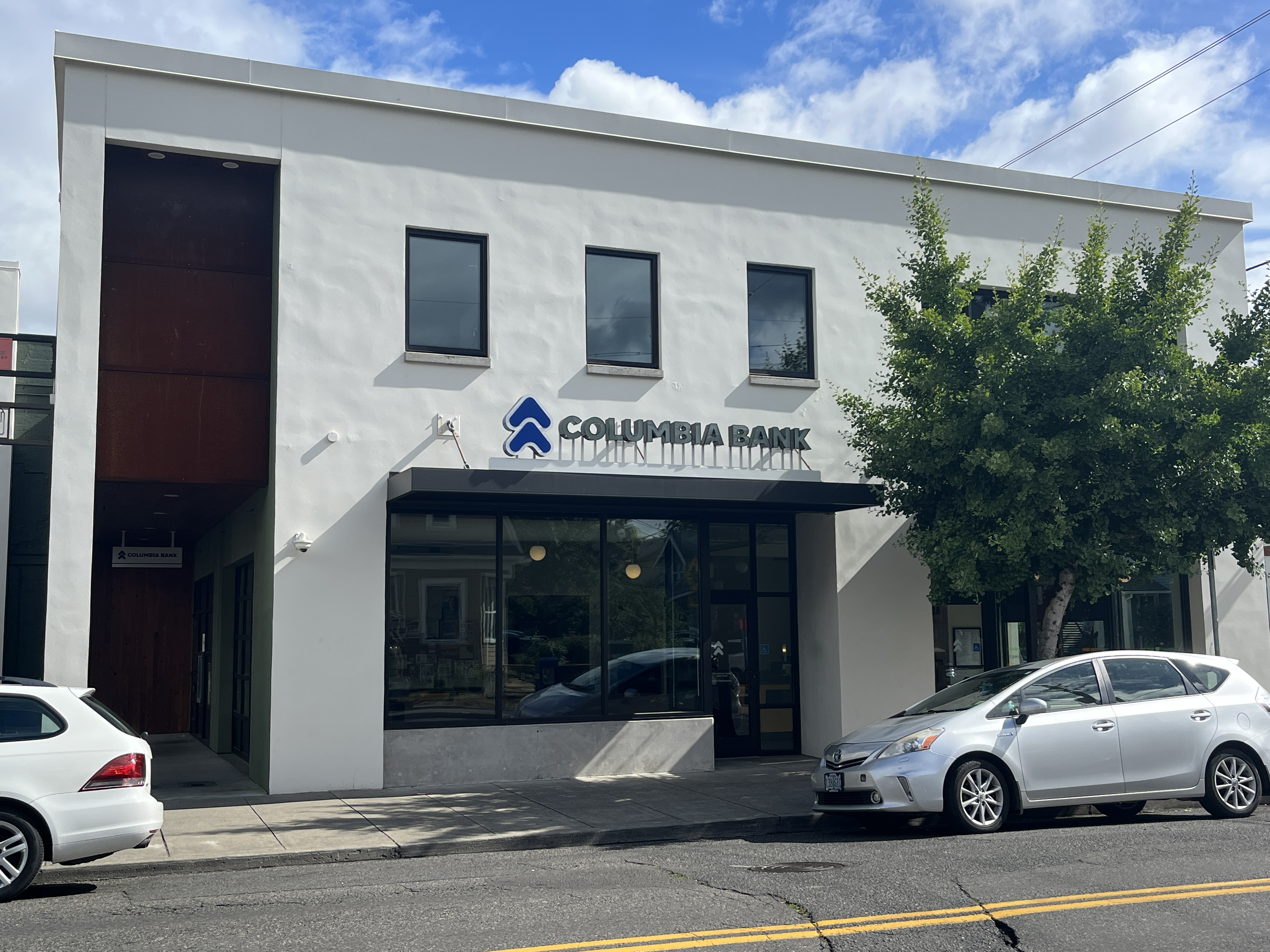
- Exterior of a bank branch in Portland, Oregon, 2026
- Formerly: Columbia National Bank (1973–1993); Columbia State Bank (1993–2023); Umpqua Bank (2023–2025)
- Traded as: Nasdaq: COLB
- Industry: Commercial Banks
- Founded: November 10, 1973; 52 years ago (as Columbia National Bank); August 16, 1993; 33 years ago (as Columbia State Bank)
- Headquarters: Bank: Longview, Washington (1973–1993); Tacoma, Washington (1993–2023); Portland, Oregon (since 2023); Holding Company: Tacoma, Washington (since 1993)
- Number of locations: 376 (2026)
- Key people: Clint Stein (President, CEO, and Chairman); Christopher Merrywell (Co-President); Torran Nixon (Co-President); Ivan Seda (CFO)
- Products: Checking accounts Savings accounts Retirement accounts Home loans Personal investing Private bank Business loans Treasury management Merchant services
- Revenue: ▼US$283 million (2026)
- Net income: ▼US$192.3 million (2026)
- Total assets: ▼US$66.03 billion (2026)
- Total equity: ▼US$7.66 billion (2026)
- Parent: Columbia National Bankshares, Inc. (1973–1993); Columbia Banking System, Inc. (since 1993)
- Website: https://www.columbiabank.com

Columbia Bank is a bank based in Portland, Oregon. It is the primary subsidiary of Tacoma, Washington based financial holding company Columbia Banking System, Inc. It operates 350 branches in Washington, Oregon, California, Arizona, Nevada, Idaho, Utah, and Colorado.

== History ==
Columbia National Bank began in Longview, Washington in 1973. Columbia Banking System was formed in 1988 for the purpose of acquiring Columbia National Bank, which it did in 1993. Columbia National Bank switched to a state-run charter and rebranded as Columbia State Bank. The same year it conducted an IPO and moved its headquarters from Longview to Tacoma.

In 2013, Columbia acquired West Coast Bank, significantly increasing its presence in Oregon. Columbia entered the Idaho market with its acquisition of Intermountain Community Bancorp, parent of Panhandle State Bank, in 2014. Columbia acquired Pacific Continental Bank in 2017. Columbia entered the California market with its acquisition of Merchants Bank of Commerce in 2021.

In October 2021, Columbia Banking System announced a merger of equals with Portland, Oregon-based Umpqua Holdings Corporation and its bank subsidiary, Umpqua Bank. Although Columbia was the nominal survivor, Umpqua was the accounting acquirer, and the combined bank adopted the Umpqua Bank name. The combined company's corporate headquarters were in Tacoma, Washington, while the bank's headquarters were in Portland, Oregon. The $5 billion deal closed in March 2023.

In April 2025, Columbia announced its acquisition of Irvine, California-based Pacific Premier Bancorp for $2 billion. The deal closed in September 2025.

In September 2025 Umpqua Bank rebranded to Columbia Bank, unifying all of Columbia's subsidiaries under one name.
