= Prevention of viral hemorrhagic fever =

Viral disease prevention methods

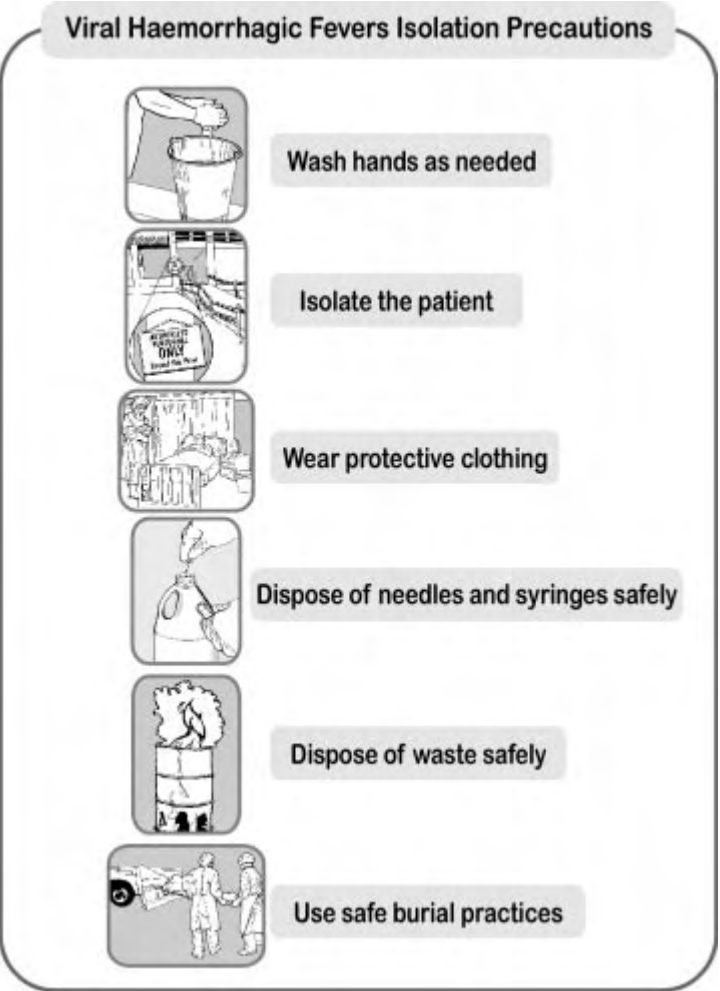
VHF isolation precautions poster

Viral hemorrhagic fevers (VHFs) are a diverse group of diseases. Prevention methods are very similar for the different viruses. The vast majority of the information in this article is from the document "Infection Control for Viral Hemorrhagic Fevers in the African Health Care Setting", which was published in December 1998. It was prepared by the Centers for Disease Control and Prevention (CDC) (part of the national government in the United States of America) and the World Health Organization (WHO) (a non-governmental organization).

The VHFs impacting people in Africa include Lassa fever, Rift Valley fever, Marburg virus, Ebola virus, Crimean-Congo hemorrhagic fever (CCHF), and yellow fever.

Many VHFs are spread through bites or scratches of infected bats, mosquitos, rodents, or ticks.

Some VHFs are spread by touching an infected animal's or human's body fluids, including blood, feces, pus, saliva, semen, urine, and vomit. They can also spread with airborne droplets. In other words, if an infected person coughs, which means tiny drops of their saliva come out of their mouth and into the air, then another person who is nearby can become infected.

== Standard precautions ==
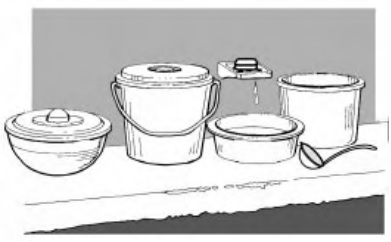
An example of a handwashing station in a low resource setting

The use of standard precautions is recommended with all patients in a healthcare environment. This includes a minimum level of standard precautions for use with all people regardless of their infection status, routine handwashing practices, safe handling and disposal of used needles and syringes, and intensifying standard precautions. It also includes VHF isolation precautions when needed.

Limited supplies and resources may prevent a health facility from using all the standard precautions all the time. However, health facilities should establish and maintain a basic, practical level of standard precautions that can be used routinely with patients in their health facility. This requires a source of clean water, routine handwashing before and after any contact with a person who has fever, and safe handling and disposal of sharp instruments and equipment.

Washing hands with soap and water eliminates microorganisms from the skin and hands. This provides some protection against transmission of VHF and other diseases. This requires at least cake soap cut into small pieces, soap dishes with openings that allow water to drain away, running water or a bucket kept full with clean water, a bucket for collecting rinse water and a ladle for dipping, if running water is not available, and one-use towels.

The handwashing technique that is recommended is to place a piece of soap in the palm of one hand, wash the opposite hand and forearm, rub the surfaces vigorously for at least 10 seconds, move soap to the opposite hand and repeat, use clean water to rinse both hands and then the forearms, dry the hands and forearms with a clean one-use towel, or let rinsed hands and forearms air-dry.

Reusable needles and syringes are not recommended. If reusable needles and syringes are used, clean, disinfect and sterilize them before reuse. Needles and syringes used with VHF patients require special care. Cleaning staff should wear two pairs of gloves when handling needles and syringes used with any patient with a known or suspected VHF.

== Identifying suspected cases ==
In an outbreak situation, several cases occur around the same time. They may be grouped together, and there may be person-to-person transmission. An initial diagnosis of a VHF can be made based on the signs and symptoms of the specific VHF.

Suspecting a VHF during a non-outbreak situation in a single case is more difficult. The early symptoms of a VHF include high fever and headache. These are also symptoms for many infections seen at the health facility. Most people who present with fever do not have a VHF. Their fever is more often caused by malaria, typhoid fever, dysentery, severe bacterial infection or other fever-producing illnesses usually seen in the area.

The health worker probably will not suspect a VHF until more severe signs develop and the patient does not respond to recommended treatment for other illnesses. However, health workers should be aware of the possibility of VHF in a non-outbreak situation. As soon as a VHF is suspected, VHF isolation precautions should begin. This will help reduce the number of people exposed to the VHF.

== Isolation ==
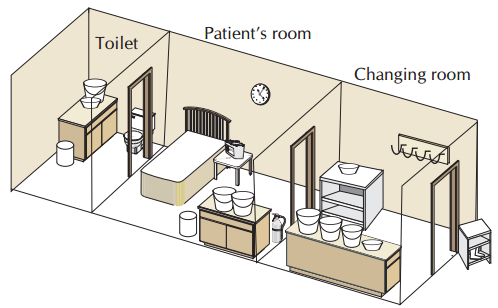
A sample layout of an isolation area

Isolating the VHF patient will restrict patient access to health facility staff trained to use VHF isolation precautions. Establish a barrier between the VHF patient and uninfected patients, other health facility staff, and visitors.

== Protective clothing ==
When a VHF case is suspected in the health facility, the following protective clothing should be worn in the isolation area:

- A scrub suit or inner layer of clothing (an old shirt and trousers brought from home)
- A pair of thin gloves
- Rubber boots or overshoes (only if the floor is soiled)
- A gown or outer layer of clothing (surgical or disposable gown with long sleeves and cuffs)
- A plastic apron worn over both layers of clothes
- A second pair of thin or thick gloves. Wearing a second pair of gloves provides an added measure of safety during patient care and when handling contaminated supplies
- A HEPA-filter (high-efficiency particulate air respirator) or other biosafety mask (or surgical mask if HEPA-filter or other biosafety mask is not available)
- Cotton head covering
- Clear eyeglasses or non-fogging goggles

When protective clothing is not available or is in short supply, adaptations must be made and used.

=== Putting on ===
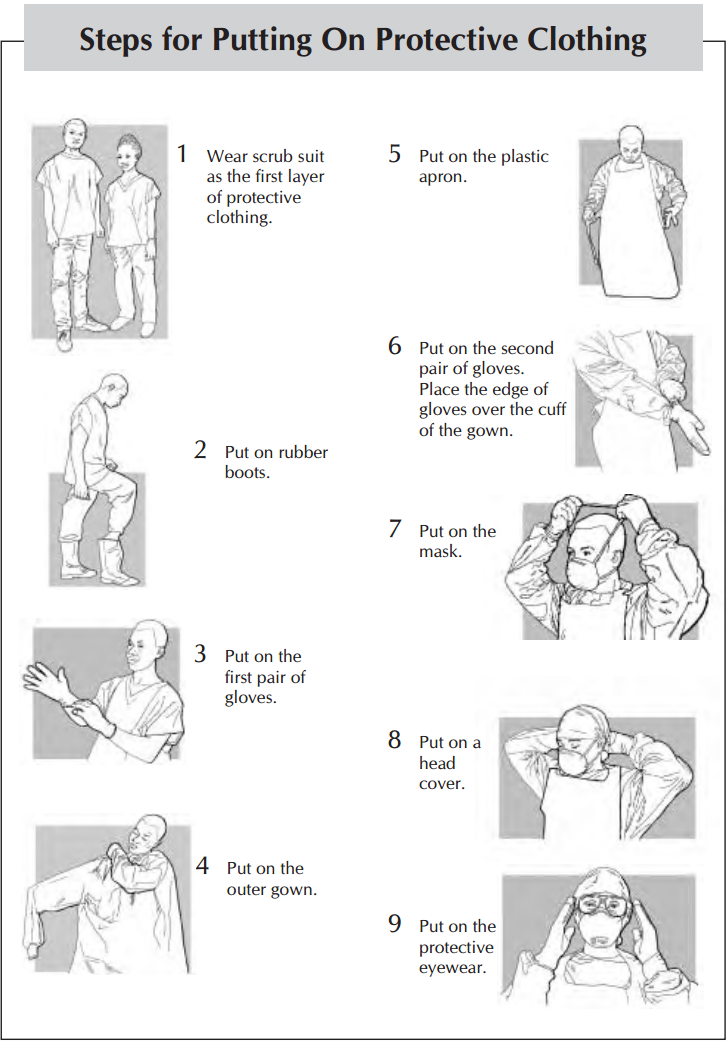
Steps for putting on protective clothing

There are specific recommendation regarding the putting on of protective clothing including:

- Before entering the changing room, remove jewelry, wallets and other valuables.
- Remove street clothes and hang them on a hook. Put on the scrub suit or set of old clothes.
- Enter the changing room.
- Put on rubber boots. Put on each boot and tuck the trouser leg inside the boot. If overboots are used, tape the top of the boot to the leg with plastic tape. This will help prevent spills from running inside the boots.
- Put on the first pair of gloves. Look at your hands for cut or broken skin. If the skin is cut or broken, refrain from direct patient contact. Put on one glove at a time. If the scrub suit or set of old clothes has long sleeves, place the edge of each glove under the cuff. When only one pair of gloves is worn, place the edge of the glove over the cuff or gown. If gloves are not available, use plastic bags. Put on one layer now. Attach and close the first layer with tape or elastic bands
- Put on the outer gown. Pick up the gown from the inside. This is especially important if the gown is being reused
- Put on the plastic or rubber apron.
- Put on the second pair of gloves
- Put on the mask and head cover
- Put on the protective eyewear. Attach the eyeglasses or goggles behind the head with string or cord to prevent the eyewear from falling off.
Introduction

Trained oberserver

Removing own clothing

Examining equipment

Hand cleaning

Boot covers

Inner gloves

Coverall

N95 respirator

surgical hood

Outer apron

Outer gloves

Face shield

Verification

=== Taking off ===
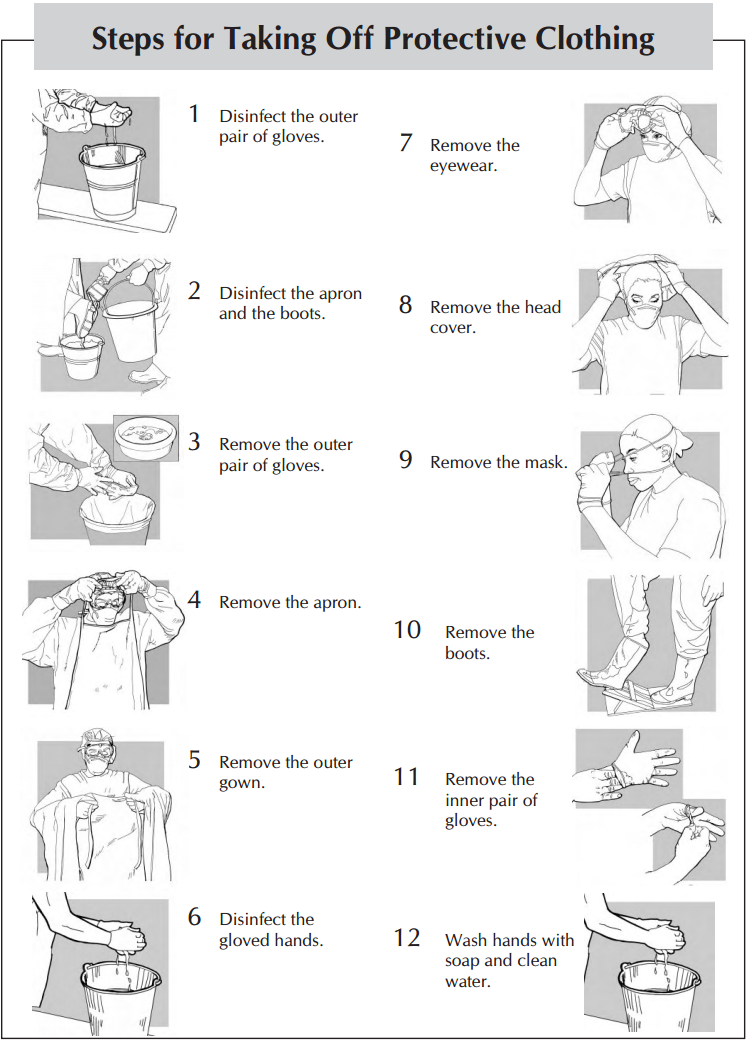
Steps for taking off protective clothing

There are also specific recommendations regarding the removal of protective clothing including:

- Disinfect the outer pair of gloves, wash the gloved hands in soap and water, dip the gloved hands in 1:100 bleach solution (see below) for one minute
- Disinfect the apron. Spray or wipe it with 1:100 bleach solution.
- Disinfect the boots. Use a sprayer containing 1:100 bleach solution to spray boots or hold the foot over a pan or basin and ask another health worker to pour 1:100 bleach solution over the boots or step into a shallow pan containing 1:100 bleach solution and wipe boots on a bleach-drenched cloth
- Remove the outer pair of gloves
- Remove the apron and outer gown
- Disinfect the gloved hands after contact with apron and outer gown.
- Remove the eyewear, head cover and mask.
- Remove the boots. Place a towel that has been soaked in 1:100 bleach solution on the floor for health facility staff to stand on when removing boots
- Remove the inner pair of gloves.
- Remove inner layer of clothes and dress in street clothes.
- Wash hands with soap and clean water before leaving the changing room

== Disinfection of equipment ==
Disinfection kills almost all bacteria, fungi, viruses, and protozoa. It reduces the number of microorganisms to make equipment and surfaces safer for use. When VHF is suspected in the health facility, all medical, nursing, laboratory and cleaning staff should disinfect:

- Hands and skin after contact with a VHF patient or infectious body fluids
- Gloved hands after contact with each VHF patient or after contact with infectious body fluids (when gloves cannot be changed)
- Thermometers, stethoscopes and other medical instruments after use with each VHF patient
- Spills of infectious body fluids on the walls and floors
- Patient excreta and containers contaminated by patient excreta
- Reusable supplies such as protective clothing and patient bedding
- Used needles and syringes

=== Preparing bleach ===
Two strengths of solution are recommended.

- 1:10 bleach solution is a strong solution used to disinfect excreta and bodies. It is also used to prepare the 1:100 bleach solution.
- 1:100 bleach solution is used to disinfect surfaces, medical equipment, patient bedding, reusable protective clothing before it is laundered, rinsing gloves between contact with each patient, rinsing gloves, apron and boots before leaving the patient's room, disinfecting contaminated waste for disposal

The dilutions mentioned pertain to a starting concentration of 5% active chlorine, so the 1:10 solution is 0.5% and the 1:100 is 0.05%.

These solutions must be prepared new each day as they lose their strength after 24 hours.

== Disposal of waste ==
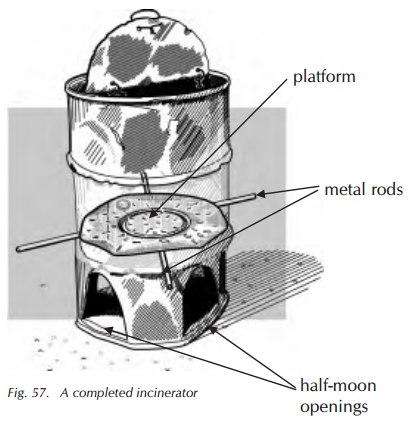
A completed incinerator

Direct, unprotected contact during disposal of infectious waste can result in accidental transmission of VHF. For this reason, all contaminated waste produced in the care of the VHF patient must be disposed of safely. All non-reusable items should be destroyed so they cannot be used again. Burning should be carried out at least daily.

Liquid waste, including patient excreta, can be disposed of in an isolated latrine or toilet set aside for VHF cases. Burning is the recommended method for disposal of other VHF-contaminated waste. A safe and inexpensive disposal system can be made by using an incinerator or a pit for burning. Use fuel to accelerate the burning and ensure that all waste is completely destroyed.

== Burial practices ==
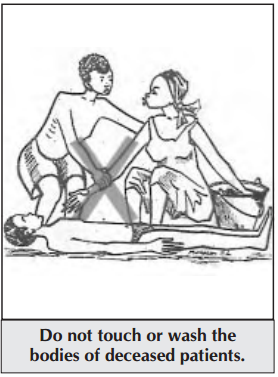
Community education material regarding dead bodies and viral hemorrhagic fever

There is risk of transmission in the health facility when a VHF patient dies because the bodies and body fluids of deceased VHF patients remain contagious for several days after death. Family and community members are also at risk if burial practices involve touching and washing the body.

Burial should take place as soon as possible after the body is prepared in the health facility. Health facility staff should prepare the body safely and instruct families on what is and is not safe.

To prepare the body, protective clothing is recommended per usually with a second pair of thick rubber gloves. The body and the area around it is sprayed with 1:10 bleach solution. The body is placed in a “body bag” (mortuary sack) and it is closed securely. The body bag is sprayed with 1:10 bleach solution. The body is then transported to the burial site as soon as possible. Any person who must touch or carry the body during transport should wear the same protective clothing as is worn in the isolation area. The grave should be at least 2 meters deep. Viewing the body is not possible and the burial ceremony should be limited to family only. The interior of the vehicle where the body was carried should be rinsed with 1:10 bleach solution.

== Community education ==
Community education and involvement is an important part of the prevention of the spread of VHF.
