= Neuber =

Neuber is a surname. Notable people with the surname include:

- Friederike Caroline Neuber (1697–1760), German actress and theatre director
- Georg Neuber (1925–2022), German fencer
- Gustav Adolf Neuber (1850–1932), German surgeon
- Janko Neuber (born 1971), German cross-country skier
