= Operating theater =

Room in a hospital in which surgeries are performed

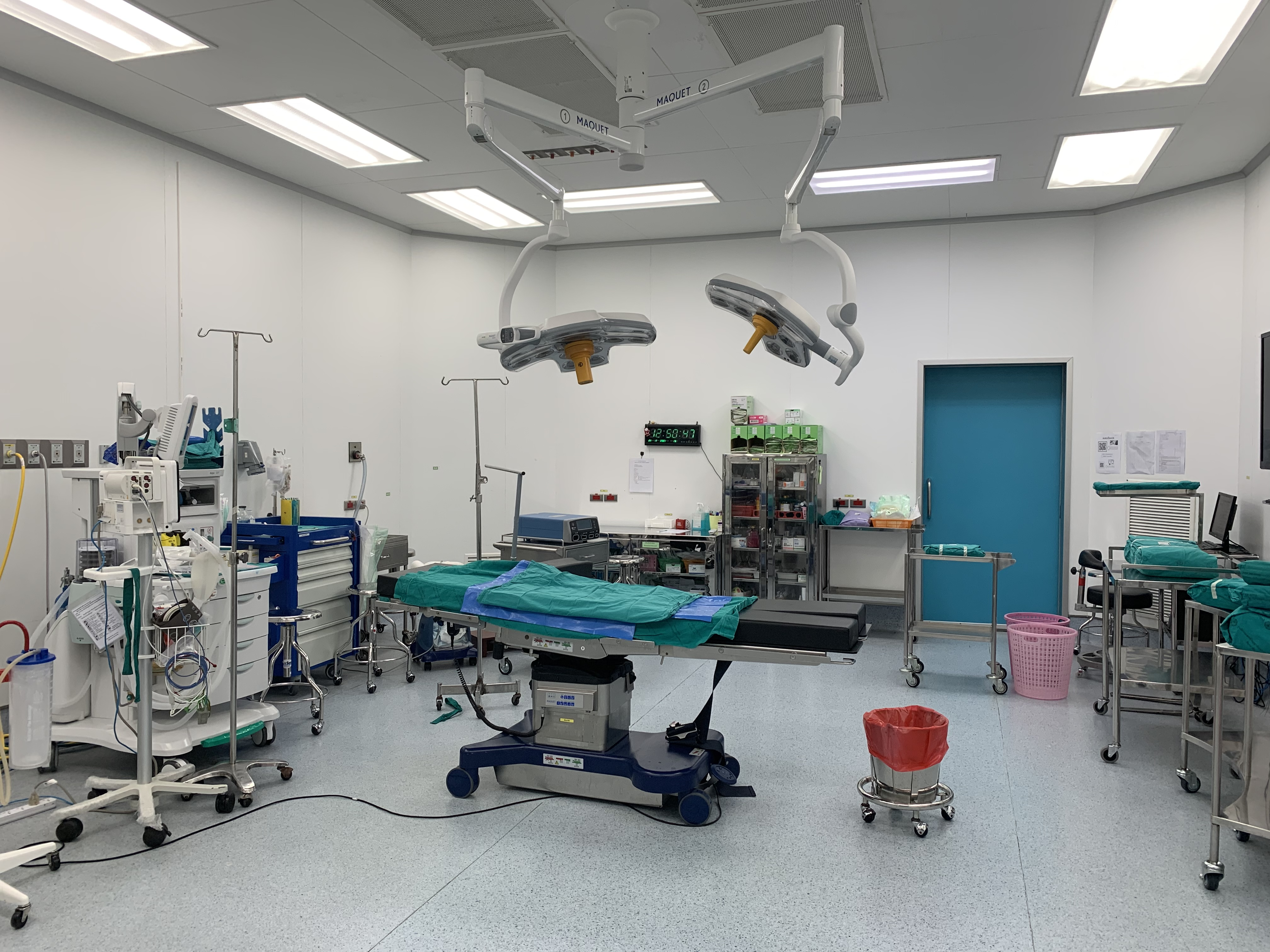
Inside a modern operating room

An operating theater (or operation theater, OT; also known as an operating room or OR, as well as an operating suite or operation suite) is a facility within a hospital where surgical operations are carried out in an aseptic environment.

Historically, the term operating theater referred to a non-sterile, tiered theater or amphitheater in which students and other spectators could watch surgeons perform surgery. Contemporary operating rooms are usually devoid of a theater setting, making the term operating theater a misnomer in those cases.

== Classification of operation theatre ==
Operating rooms are spacious, in a cleanroom, and well-lit, typically with overhead surgical lights, and may have viewing screens and monitors. Operating rooms are generally windowless, though windows are becoming more prevalent in newly built theaters to provide clinical teams with natural light, and feature controlled temperature and humidity. Special air handlers filter the air and maintain a slightly elevated pressure. Electricity support has backup systems in case of a black-out. Rooms are supplied with wall suction, oxygen, and possibly other gasses used during provision of anesthesia. Key equipment consists of the operating table and the anesthesia cart. In addition, there are tables to set up instruments. There is storage space for common surgical supplies. There are containers for disposables. Outside the operating room, or sometimes integrated within, is a dedicated scrubbing area that is used by surgeons, anesthetists, ODPs (operating department practitioners), and nurses prior to surgery. An operating room will have a map to enable the terminal cleaner to realign the operating table and equipment to the desired layout during cleaning. Operating rooms are typically supported by an anaesthetic room, prep room, scrub and a dirty utility room.

Several operating rooms are part of the operating suite that forms a distinct section within a health-care facility. Besides the operating rooms and their wash rooms, it contains rooms for personnel to change, wash, and rest, preparation and recovery rooms, storage and cleaning facilities, offices, dedicated corridors, and possibly other supportive units. In larger facilities, the operating suite is climate- and air-controlled, and separated from other departments so that only authorized personnel have access.

=== Operating room equipment ===
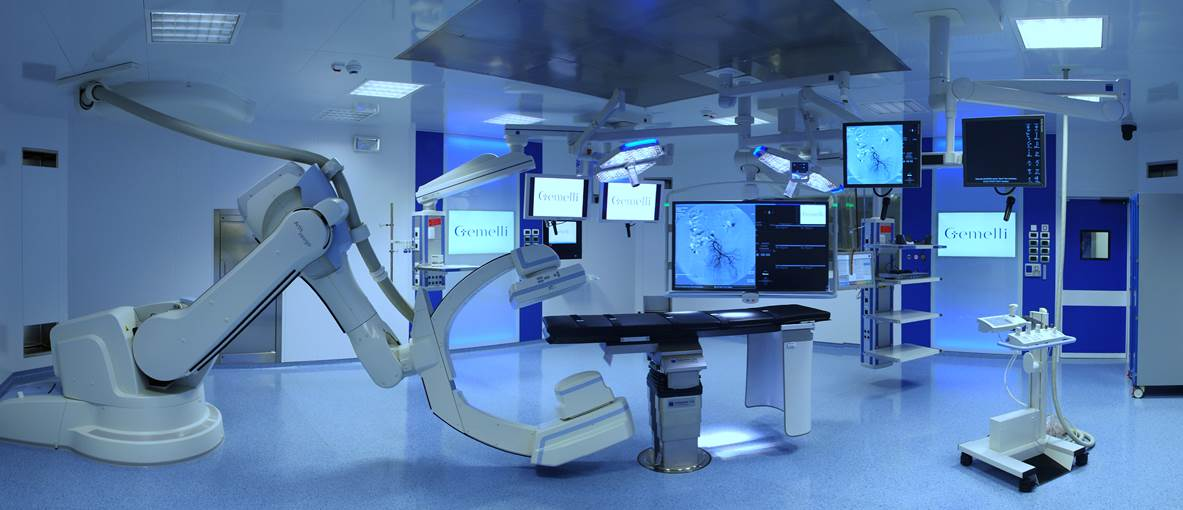
Hybrid operating room for cardiovascular surgery at Gemelli Hospital in Rome

- The operating table in the center of the room can be raised, lowered, and tilted in any direction.
- The operating room lights are over the table to provide bright light, without shadows, during surgery.
- The anesthesia machine is at the head of the operating table. This machine has tubes that connect to the patient to assist them in breathing during surgery, and built-in monitors that help control the mixture of gases in the breathing circuit.
- The anesthesia cart is next to the anesthesia machine. It contains the medications, equipment, and other supplies that the anesthesiologist may need.
- Sterile instruments to be used during surgery are arranged on a stainless steel table.
- An electronic monitor (which records the heart rate and respiratory rate by adhesive patches that are placed on the patient's chest).
- The pulse oximeter machine attaches to the patient's finger with an elastic band aid. It measures the amount of oxygen contained in the blood.
- Automated blood pressure measuring machine that automatically inflates the blood pressure cuff on a patient's arm.
- An electrocautery machine uses high frequency electrical signals to cauterize or seal off blood vessels and may also be used to cut through tissue with a minimal amount of bleeding.
- If surgery requires, a heart-lung machine or other specialized equipment may be brought into the room.
- Supplementary portable air decontaminating equipment is sometimes placed in the OR.
- Advances in technology now support hybrid operating rooms, which integrate diagnostic imaging systems such as MRI and cardiac catheterization into the operating room to assist surgeons in specialized neurological and cardiac procedures.

== Surgeon and assistants' equipment ==
People in the operating room wear PPE (personal protective equipment) to help prevent bacteria from infecting the surgical incision. This PPE includes the following:

- A protective cap covering their hair
- Masks over their lower face, covering their mouths and noses with minimal gaps to prevent inhalation of plume or airborne microbes
- Shades or glasses over their eyes, including specialized colored glasses for use with different lasers. a fiber-optic headlight may be attached for greater visibility
- Sterile gloves; usually latex-free due to latex sensitivity which affects some health care workers and patients
- Long gowns, with the bottom of the gown no closer than six inches to the ground.
- Protective covers on their shoes
- If x-rays are expected to be used, lead aprons/neck covers are used to prevent overexposure to radiation

The surgeon may also wear special glasses to help them see more clearly. The circulating nurse and anesthesiologist will not wear a gown in the OR because they are not a part of the sterile team. They must keep a distance of 12–16 inches from any sterile object, person, or field.

== History ==
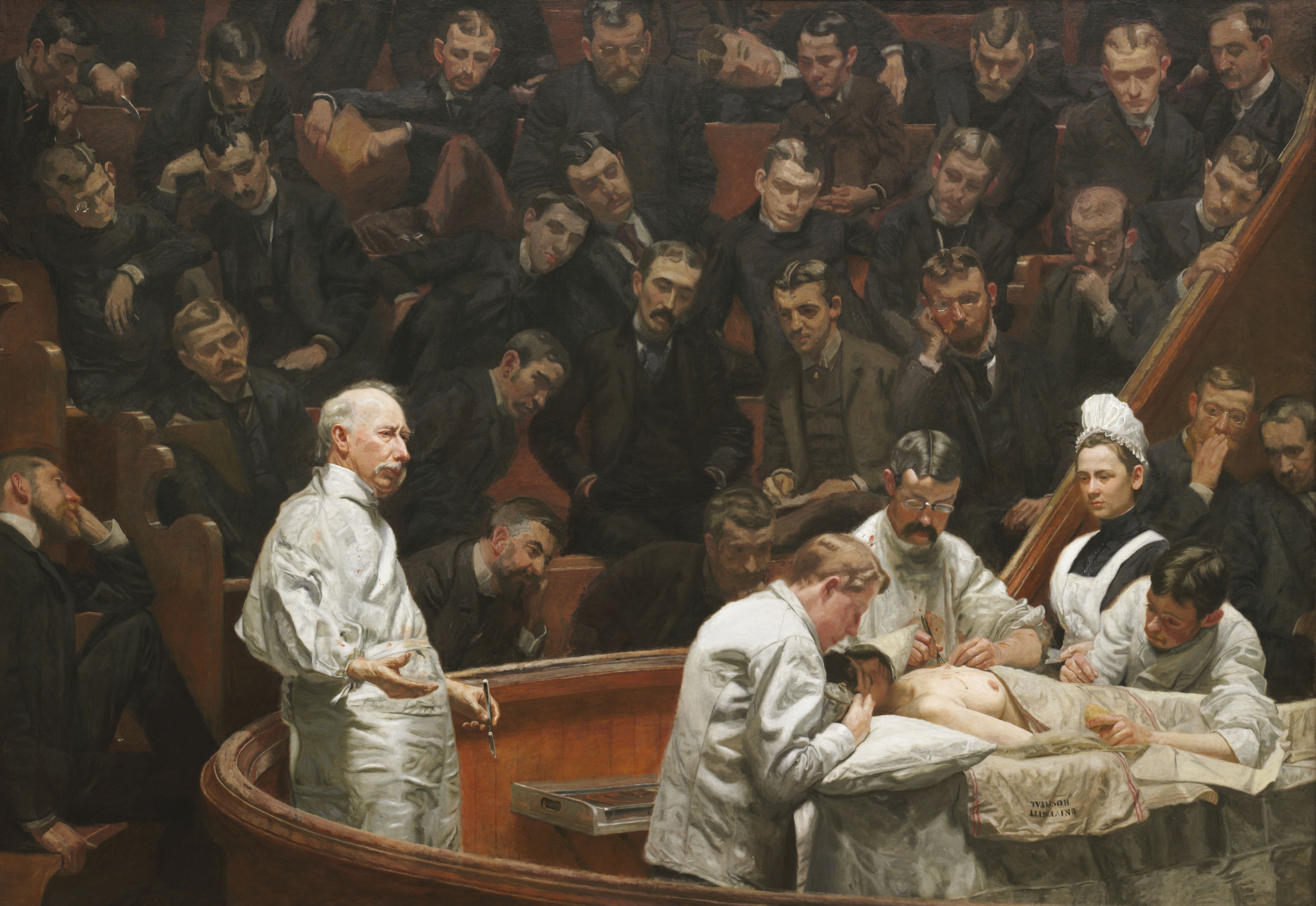
The Agnew Clinic, 1889, by Thomas Eakins, showing the tiered arrangement of observers watching the operation.

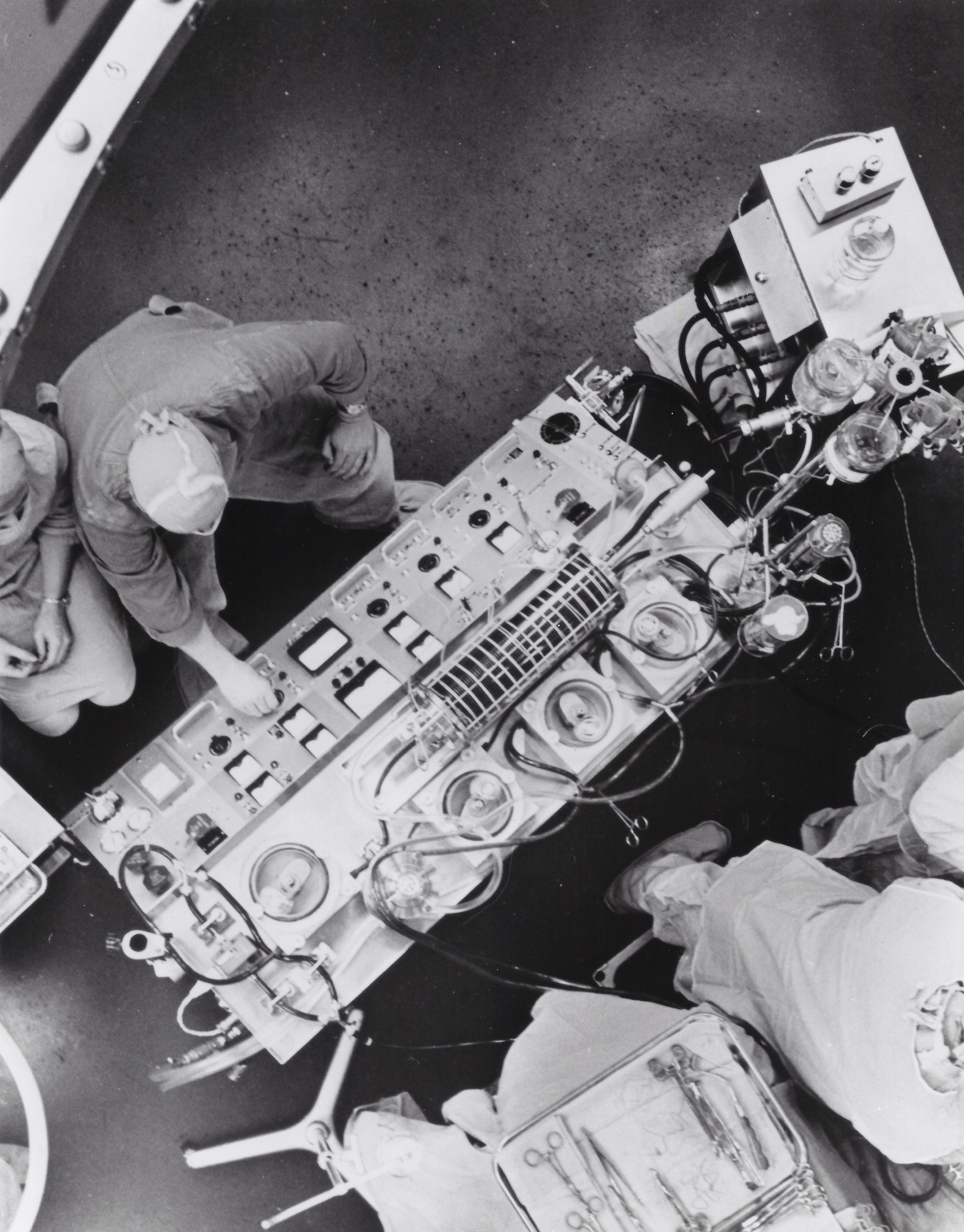
An operating room in the United States, c. 1960; heart–lung machine with rotating disc oxygenator shown

Early Modern operating theaters in an educational setting had raised tables or chairs at the center for performing operations surrounded by steep tiers of standing stalls for students and other spectators to observe the case in progress. The surgeons wore street clothes with an apron to protect them from blood stains, and they operated bare-handed with unsterilized instruments and supplies.

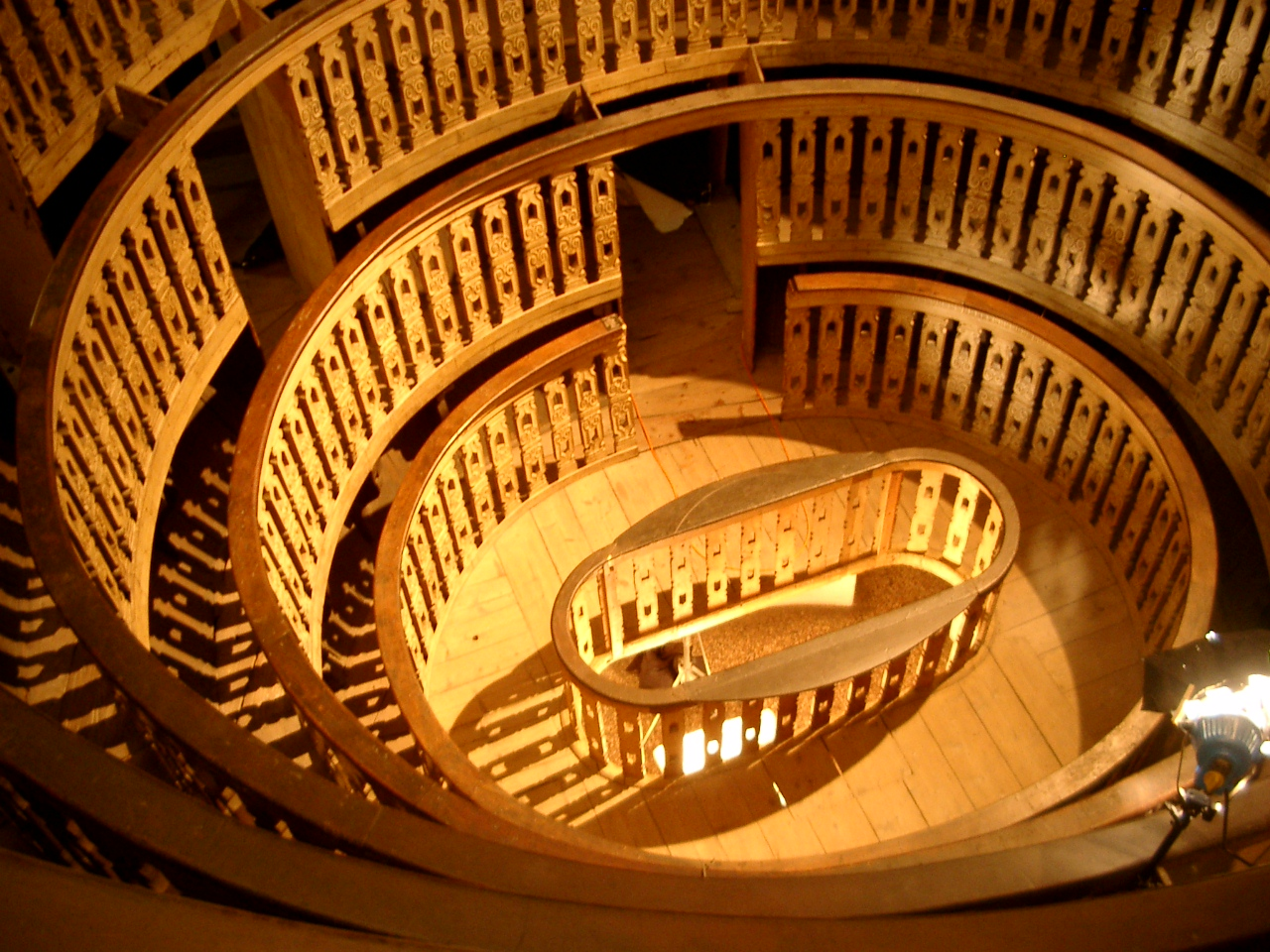
The University of Padua houses the oldest surviving permanent anatomical theatre in Europe, dating from 1595. It was used as an anatomical lecture hall where professors operated only on corpses.

The University of Padua began teaching medicine in 1222. It played a leading role in the identification and treatment of diseases and ailments, specializing in autopsies and the inner workings of the body. In 1884 German surgeon Gustav Neuber implemented a comprehensive set of restrictions to ensure sterilization and aseptic operating conditions through the use of gowns, caps, and shoe covers, all of which were cleansed in his newly invented autoclave. In 1885 he designed and built a private hospital in the woods where the walls, floors and hands, arms and faces of staff were washed with mercuric chloride, instruments were made with flat surfaces and the shelving was easy-to-clean glass. Neuber also introduced separate operating theaters for infected and uninfected patients and the use of heated and filtered air in the theater to eliminate germs. In 1890 surgical gloves were introduced to the practice of medicine by William Halsted. Aseptic surgery was pioneered in the United States by Charles McBurney.

=== Surviving operating theaters ===
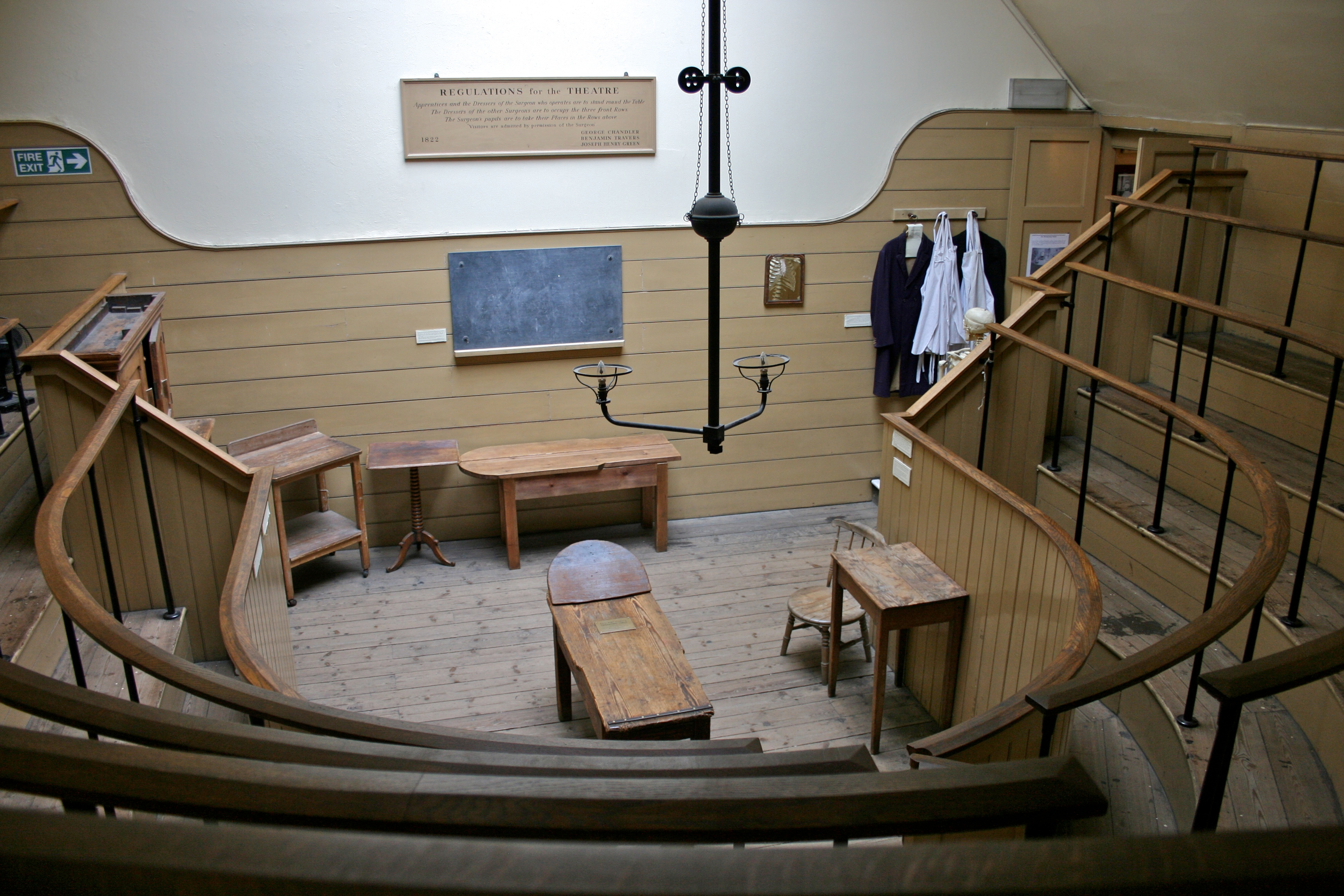
Old Operating Theatre in London

The oldest surviving operating theater is thought to be the 1804 operating theater of the Pennsylvania Hospital in Philadelphia. The 1821 Ether Dome of the Massachusetts General Hospital is still in use as a lecture hall. Another surviving operating theater is the Old Operating Theatre in London. Built in 1822, it is now a museum of surgical history. The Anatomical Theater at the University of Padua, in Italy, inside Palazzo Bo was constructed and used as a lecture hall for medical students who observed the dissection of corpses, not surgical operations. It was commissioned by the anatomist Girolamo Fabrizio d'Acquapendente in 1595.

== Safety and Hazards ==
The operating room presents occupational risks and safety challenges. These risks and hazards can affect the wellbeing of the staff, who often work in these high risk environments and can interfere with surgery. The health risks in the operating theater that can pose short or long term effects. The risks can range from physical strain, equipment related injuries, biohazardous material, and environmental factors. In order to keep the operating theater a safe environment for both staff and the patient, there are strict protocols. These strict protocols are communicated within the surgical team for safety of both staff and the patient. The protocols ensure safe handling of the equipment, proper training from staff, protective measures of biological and physical hazards. This helps greatly reduce harmful exposures as well as injuries. Occupational safety is one of the major two components that focuses on the safety of the staff. Chemical safety is the other major component that addresses anesthetic gasses and hazardous substances that can pose a serious problem to the staff and the patient on the operating room table.

=== Occupational Safety ===
Occupational safety refers to protecting staff from work related hazards and injuries. Physical hazards include sharp objects, repetitive movements, static positions, and loud equipment. Surgeons experience the highest rate of work-related musculoskeletal disorders compared to other physicians in other specialties due to standing in a static position for long periods of time and using repetitive hand and wrist movements that can lead to muscle fatigue and strain injuries. Surgeons are also at high risks for cuts and stabs due to the amount of sharp objects in an operating theater. Lack of proper equipment, assistance, and safety policies could lead to injuries from sharp objects. The Occupational Safety and Health Administration (OSHA), a United States agency that regulates conditions of work environments, does not regulate the management of uncontaminated instruments and sharps. To decrease these risks that surgeons face, hospitals and medical facilities should implement strict safety measures, including ergonomic training, proper equipment handling protocols, surgical safety checklists and regular safety audits.

=== Chemical Safety ===
Chemical safety refers to safely being able to manage and prevent any exposure to hazardous substances and anesthetic gases. The OSHA Occupational Exposure to hazardous Chemicals in Laboratories describe procedures that are applicable to many work settings. Chemical safety rules should be written for the specific need and be provided to all potentially exposed. It should cover administrative and purchasing responsibilities, safety documentation, chemical management, inspections and emergency preparedness. Chemicals are often used by anesthesiologist, and without proper precaution, it can cause potential hazards with the health care workers inside the operating room . There can be airborne and surface contaminants during procedures, this can affect staff as well as the person on the table. During the use of anesthesia in the operating room, anesthesia gasses can escape through a leak, the anesthesia machine, tubing, etc. Chronic exposure of waste anesthesia gasses can lead to reproductive and long-term organ effects for operating room staff. In an uncontrolled air quality setting, there is no way of telling how much leakage there is which is harmful to operating room staff. There are also disinfectant wipes and that may be used to help with the sterilization of equipment. The chemical that is used to disinfect can be harsh on the skin and even cause respiratory problems due to how harsh the chemical may be. Strengthening chemical safety management is an important prevention step. This involves hospitals having proper labeling, safe storage, and handling of disinfectants and anesthetic agents, along with ensuring that staff understand the health risks associated with these substances.

== See also ==
- Anatomical theater
- Hybrid operating room
