= Universal precautions =

Medical standard for contact avoidance

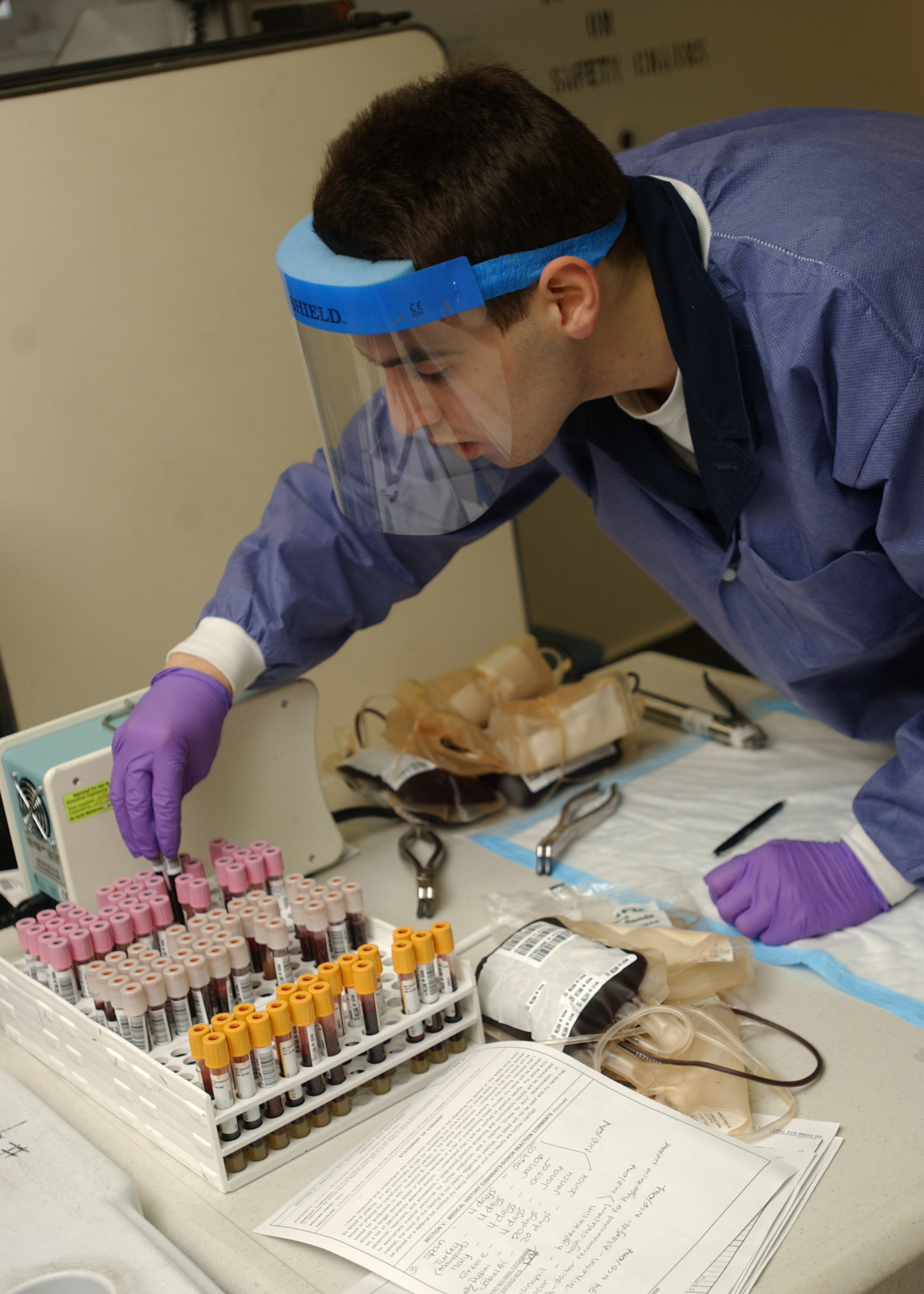
A US Navy hospital corpsman wearing personal protective equipment (PPE) while handling blood samples.

Universal precautions refers to the practice, in medicine, of avoiding contact with patients' bodily fluids, by means of the wearing of nonporous articles such as medical gloves, goggles, and face shields. The infection control techniques were essentially good hygiene habits, such as hand washing and the use of gloves and other barriers, the correct handling of hypodermic needles, scalpels, and aseptic techniques.

Following the AIDS outbreak in the 1980s, the US CDC formally introduced them in 1985–88. Every patient was treated as if infected, and therefore precautions were taken to minimize risk.

In 1987, the practice of universal precautions was adjusted by a set of rules known as body substance isolation. In 1996, both practices were replaced by the latest approach known as standard precautions. Use of personal protective equipment is now recommended in all health care settings.

== Historical significance ==
Universal precautions are an infection control practice. Under universal precautions all patients were considered to be possible carriers of blood-borne pathogens. The guideline recommended wearing gloves when collecting or handling blood and body fluids contaminated with blood, wearing face shields when there was danger of blood splashing on mucous membranes, and disposing of all needles and sharp objects in puncture-resistant containers.

Universal precautions were introduced in the US by CDC in the wake of the AIDS epidemic between 1985 and 1988.

In 1987, the practice of universal precautions was adjusted by a set of rules known as body substance isolation. In 1996, both practices were replaced by the latest approach known as standard precautions.

== Use ==
Universal precautions were designed for doctors, nurses, patients, and healthcare workers who came into contact with patients and their bodily fluids. This included staff and others who might not come into direct contact with patients.

Universal precautions were typically practiced in any environment where workers were exposed to bodily fluids, such as blood, semen, vaginal secretions, synovial fluid, amniotic fluid, cerebrospinal fluid, pleural fluid, peritoneal fluid, pericardial fluid, feces and urine.

Bodily fluids which did not require such precautions included nasal secretions, vomitus, perspiration, sputum and saliva.

== Equipment ==
Since pathogens fall into two broad categories, bloodborne (carried in the body fluids) and airborne, personal protective equipment included, but was not limited to barrier gowns, gloves, masks, eyewear like goggles or glasses and face shields.

== Additional precautions ==
Additional precautions are used in addition to universal precautions for patients who are known or suspected to have an infection that requires extra measures, depending on the suspected route of transmission. Additional precautions are not needed for blood-borne infections unless there are complicating factors or to avoid leukocyte-related complications of blood transfusion.

Conditions demanding additional precautions are prion diseases (e.g., Creutzfeldt–Jakob disease), diseases with air-borne transmission (e.g., tuberculosis), diseases with droplet transmission (e.g., mumps, rubella, influenza, pertussis) and transmission by direct or indirect contact with dried skin (e.g., colonisation with MRSA) or contaminated surfaces or any combination of the above.

== Adverse effects ==
As of 2010 research around stigma and discrimination in health-related settings has implicated universal precautions as a means by which health care workers discriminate against patients. Particularly the employment of universal precautions when working with people with HIV and/or hepatitis C has been demonstrated to be inconsistent and implicated with feelings of stigmatization reported by those populations. Health-cased social research in 2004 revealed that by not applying universal precautions universally, as is the purpose, health professionals are instead making judgements based on an individual's health status. It is speculated that this differential approach to care stems from stigma towards HIV and hepatitis C, rooted largely in fears and misconceptions around transmission and assumptions about patient lifestyle and risk.

== See also ==
- Barrier nursing
- Body substance isolation
- Viral hemorrhagic fever
- Hepatitis B
