= Isolation pod =

Individual quarantine container

An isolation pod is a capsule which is used to provide medical isolation for a patient. Examples include the Norwegian EpiShuttle and the USAF's Transport Isolation System (TIS) or Portable Bio-Containment Module (PBCM), which are used to provide isolation when transporting patients by air.

Isolation devices were developed in the 1970s for the aerial evacuation of patients with Lassa fever. In 2015, Human Stretcher Transit Isolator (HSTI) pods were used for the aerial evacuation of health workers during the Ebola virus epidemic in Guinea.

Isolation pod provide 100% protection to Frontline/Health workers biosafety level-4. During the COVID outbreak in India, 2020-21, Ahmedabad-based company Edithheathcare.in developed such pods to isolate infectious patients.

A review of 14 relevant studies concluded that the use of isolation pods for the transport of COVID-19 patients would not normally be appropriate as the use of oxygen masks and other, less-demanding precautions would be adequate. During the COVID-19 pandemic, the UK's NHS hospitals set up separate reception areas, which were called isolation pods, but these were typically temporary accommodation such as a portacabin or tent, without special technical features, just being located at a distance from the permanent facilities.

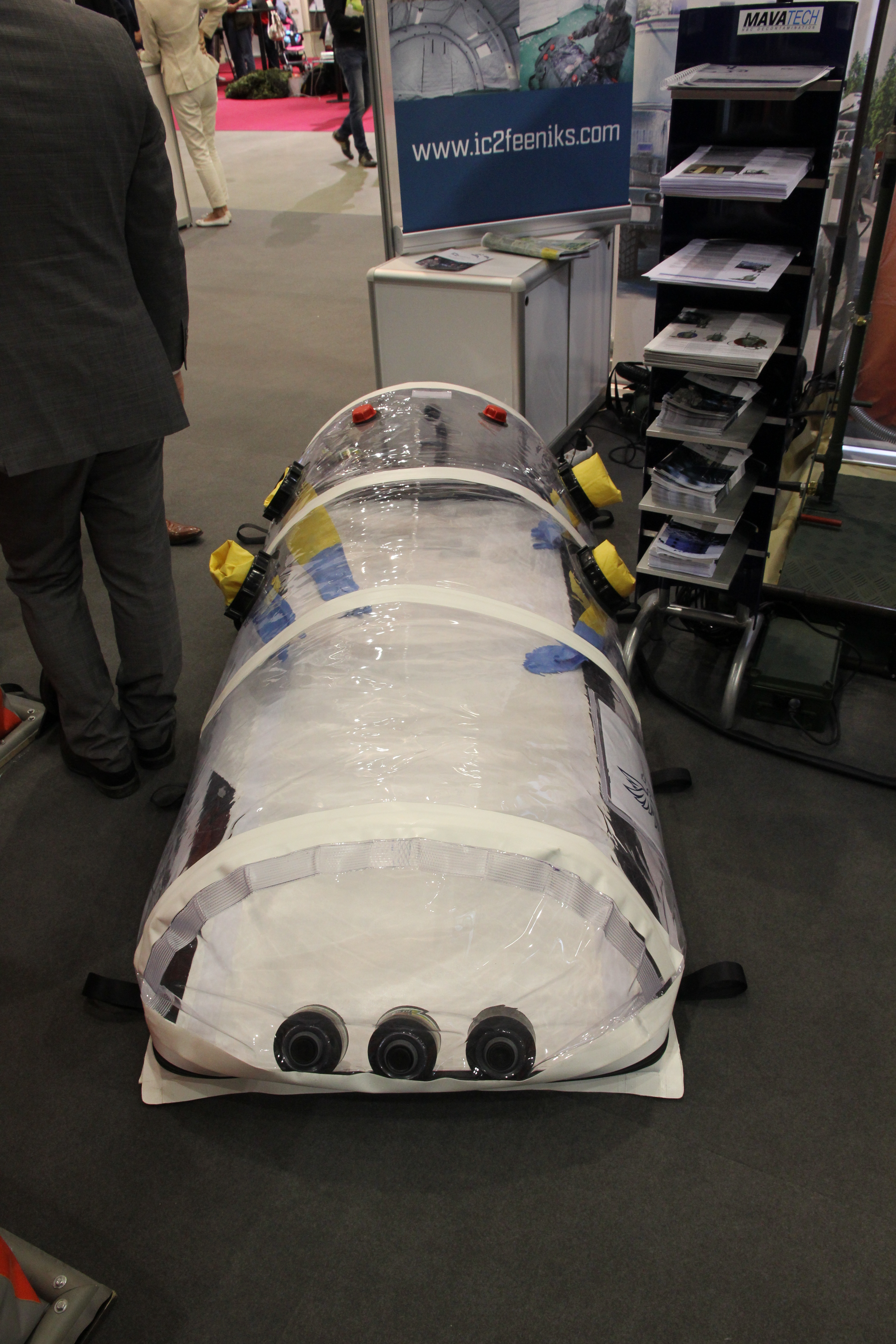
A pod designed to isolate chemical, biological, radiological and nuclear (CBRN) risks

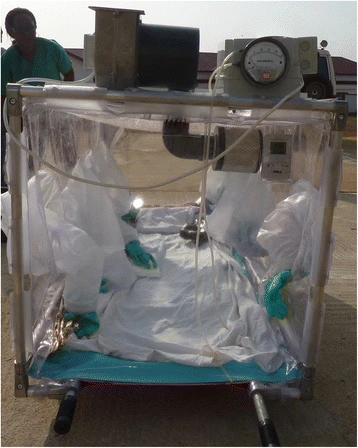
A HSTI-TCOL pod used in Guinea during an Ebola outbreak

== See also ==
- isolation ward – Medical ward designed to prevent the spread of infection
- mobile quarantine facility – Sealed accommodation for returned Apollo astronauts
- sealed train – International rail transportation of individuals without passing through customs
