= Operating field =

Sterile area where surgery is performed

An operating field, also referred to as a surgical field, is an isolated sterile area where surgery is performed. It is usually utilized to reduce the chance of post-operative infections, and aims to improve efficiency during surgery. Lower complication rates post surgery have also been linked to clearness of the operating field.
