= Protective isolation =

Health measures to avoid contracting an infection

Protective isolation or reverse isolation denotes the practices used for protecting vulnerable persons for contracting an infection. When people with weakened immune systems are exposed to organisms, it could lead to infection and serious complications. It is sometimes practiced in patients with severe burns and leukemia, or those undergoing chemotherapy. When reverse isolation is practiced in laminar air flow or high-efficiency particulate air (HEPA)-filtered rooms, there was an improvement in survival for patients receiving bone marrow or stem cell grafts.

== Precautions ==
When a person is in protective isolation, the room should be properly cleaned and ventilated. Only necessary furniture should be present in the room. Hand hygiene products such as hand sanitizer, soap, paper towels, and gloves should be made available. The hospital staff and visitors shall use protective clothing and equipment while visiting the person under protective isolation. The number of visitors should be limited and sick people should not visit the person who is under protective isolation. Dedicated medical equipment is used for the patient, and in cases where equipment should be shared, it is cleaned with a disinfectant.

== Consequences ==
A small study showed that children brought up under protective isolation have been reported to have less self-generated activity, including motor and motor-based cognitive skills.
