= Transmission-based precautions =

Infection-control precautions in health care

Transmission-based precautions are infection-control precautions in health care, in addition to the so-called "standard precautions". They are the latest routine infection prevention and control practices applied for patients who are known or suspected to be infected or colonized with infectious agents, including certain epidemiologically important pathogens, which require additional control measures to effectively prevent transmission.

Universal precautions are also important to address as far as transmission-based precautions. Universal precautions is the practice of treating all bodily fluids as if it is infected with HIV, HBV, or other blood borne pathogens.

Transmission-based precautions build on the so-called "standard precautions" which institute common practices, such as hand hygiene, respiratory hygiene, personal protective equipment protocols, soiled equipment and injection handling, patient isolation controls and risk assessments to limit spread between patients.

== History ==
The following table shows the history of guidelines for transmission-based precautions in U.S. hospitals as of 2007:

Year	Document issued	Comment
1970	Isolation Technique for Use in Hospitals, 1st ed.	Introduced seven isolation precaution categories with color-coded cards: Strict, Respiratory, Protective, Enteric, Wound and Skin, Discharge, and Blood. No user decision-making required. Simplicity a strength; over isolation prescribed for some infection.
1975	Isolation Techniques for Use in Hospitals, 2nd ed.	Same conceptual framework as 1st edition.
1983	CDC Guideline for Isolation Precautions in Hospitals	Provided two systems for isolation: category-specific and disease-specific. Protective Isolation eliminated; Blood Precautions expanded to include Body Fluids. Categories included Strict, Contact, Respiratory, AFB, Enteric, Drainage/Secretion, Blood and Body Fluids. Emphasized decision-making by users.
1985-88	Universal precautions	Developed in response to HIV/AIDS epidemic. Dictated application of Blood and Body Fluid precautions to all patients, regardless of infection status. Did not apply to feces, nasal secretions, sputum, sweat, tears, urine, or vomitus unless contaminated by visible blood. Added personal protective equipment to protect health care workers from mucous membrane exposures. Handwashing recommended immediately after glove removal. Added specific recommendations for handling needles and other sharp devices; concept became integral to OSHA's 1991 rule on occupational exposure to blood-borne pathogens in healthcare settings.
1987	Body substance isolation	Emphasized avoiding contact with all moist and potentially infectious body substances except sweat even if blood not present. Shared some features with Universal Precautions. Weak on infections transmitted by large droplets or by contact with dry surfaces. Did not emphasize need for special ventilation to contain airborne infections. Handwashing after glove removal not specified in the absence of visible soiling.
1996	Guideline for Isolation Precautions in Hospitals	Prepared by the Healthcare Infection Control Practices Advisory Committee (HICPAC). Melded major features of Universal Precautions and Body Substance Isolation into standard precautions to be used with all patients at all times. Included three transmission-based precaution categories: airborne, droplet, and contact . Listed clinical syndromes that should dictate use of empiric isolation until an etiological diagnosis is established.

== Rationale for use in healthcare setting ==
Communicable diseases occur as a result of the interaction between a source (or reservoir) of infectious agents, a mode of transmission for the agent, a susceptible host with a portal of entry receptive to the agent, the environment. The control of communicable diseases may involve changing one or more of these components, the first three of which are influenced by the environment. These diseases can have a wide range of effects, varying from silent infection – with no signs or symptoms – to severe illness and death. According to its nature, a certain infectious agent may demonstrate one or more following modes of transmission direct and indirect contact transmission, droplet transmission and airborne transmission.

Transmission-based precautions are used when the route(s) of transmission is (are) not completely interrupted using "standard precautions" alone.

=== Standard precautions ===
Standard precautions include:

- Hand hygiene or hand washing to prevent oneself from contracting an illness or disease and prevent the spread of pathogens (e.g. bacteria, viruses, parasites) to other people, thus reducing the potential for transmission. Hand hygiene can be accomplished with different modalities including alcohol-based hand sanitizers, soap and water, or antiseptic hand wash. There are techniques and benefits to using one modality over another. Utilization of alcohol-based hand sanitizer is generally recommended when the hands are not visibly soiled or before and after contact with a person (e.g. patient in a healthcare setting), or object. With proper technique, soap and water are preferred for visibly soiled hands or in situations where hands various pathogens cannot be killed with alcohol-based hand sanitizers (e.g. spore-producing organisms like Clostridioides difficile).
- personal protective equipment (PPE) in cases of infectious material exposure etiquette,
- respiratory hygiene principles,
- patient isolation controls,
- soiled equipment handling,
- and injection handling.

== Research ==
Research studies in the form of randomized controlled trials and simulation studies are needed to determine the most effective types of personal protective equipment for preventing the transmission of infectious diseases to healthcare workers. There is low-quality evidence that supports making improvements or modifications to personal protective equipment to help decrease contamination. Examples of modifications include adding tabs to masks or gloves to ease removal and designing protective gowns so that gloves are removed at the same time. In addition, there is weak evidence that the following PPE approaches or techniques may lead to reduced contamination and improved compliance with PPE protocols: Wearing double gloves, following specific doffing (removal) procedures such as those from the CDC, and providing people with spoken instructions while removing PPE.

== Definitions ==
Three categories of transmission-based precautions have been designed with respect to the modes of transmission, namely Contact precautions, Droplet precautions, and Airborne precautions. For some diseases with multiple routes of transmission, more than one transmission-based precautions category may be used. When used either singly or in combination, they are always used in addition to standard precautions.

=== Contact precautions ===
Contact precautions poster

Contact precautions are intended to prevent transmission of infectious agents, including epidemiologically important microorganisms, which are spread by direct or indirect contact with the patient or the patient's environment. The specific agents and circumstance for which contact precautions are indicated are found in Appendix A of the 2007 CDC Guidance. The application of contact precautions for patients infected or colonized with Multidrug-Resistant Organisms MDROs is described in the 2006 HICPAC/CDC MDRO guideline. Contact precautions also apply where the presence of excessive wound drainage, fecal incontinence, or other discharges from the body suggest an increased potential for extensive environmental contamination and risk of transmission. A single-patient room is preferred for patients who require contact precautions. When a single-patient room is not available, consultation with infection control personnel is recommended to assess the various risks associated with other patient placement options (e.g., cohorting, keeping the patient with an existing roommate). In multi-patient rooms, >3 feet spatial separation between beds is advised to reduce the opportunities for inadvertent sharing of items between the infected/colonized patient and other patients. Healthcare personnel caring for patients on contact precautions wear a gown and gloves for all interactions that may involve contact with the patient or potentially contaminated areas in the patient's environment. Donning PPE upon room entry and discarding before exiting the patient room is done to contain pathogens, especially those that have been implicated in transmission through environmental contamination (e.g., VRE, C. difficile, noroviruses and other intestinal tract pathogens; RSV)

=== Droplet precautions ===
Droplet precautions poster

As of 2020, the classification systems of routes of respiratory disease transmission are based on a conceptual division of large versus small droplets, as defined in the 1930s.

Droplet precautions are intended to prevent transmission of certain pathogens spread through close respiratory or mucous membrane contact with respiratory secretions, namely respiratory droplets. Because certain pathogens do not remain infectious over long distances in a healthcare facility, special air handling and ventilation are not required to prevent droplet transmission. Infectious agents for which mere droplet precautions are indicated include B. pertussis, influenza virus, adenovirus, rhinovirus, N. meningitidis, and group A streptococcus (for the first 24 hours of antimicrobial therapy). A single patient room is preferred for patients who require droplet precautions. When a single-patient room is not available, consultation with infection control personnel is recommended to assess the various risks associated with other patient placement options (e.g., cohorting, keeping the patient with an existing roommate). Spatial separation of > 3 feet and drawing the curtain between patient beds is especially important for patients in multi-bed rooms with infections transmitted by the droplet route. Healthcare personnel wear a simple mask (a respirator is not necessary) for close contact with an infectious patient, which is generally donned upon room entry. Patients on droplet precautions who must be transported outside of the room should wear a mask if tolerated and follow Respiratory Hygiene/Cough Etiquette.

=== Airborne precautions ===
Airborne precautions poster

Airborne precautions prevent transmission of infectious agents that remain infectious over long distances when suspended in the air (e.g., rubeola virus [measles], varicella virus [chickenpox], M. tuberculosis, and SARS-CoV-2 [COVID-19]). The preferred placement for patients who require airborne precautions is in an airborne infection isolation room (AIIR). An AIIR is a single-patient room that is equipped with special air handling and ventilation capacity that meet the American Institute of Architects/Facility Guidelines Institute (AIA/FGI) standards for AIIRs (i.e., monitored negative pressure relative to the surrounding area, air changes per hour (ach) for new construction and renovation and 6 air exchanges per hour for existing facilities, air exhausted directly to the outside or recirculated through HEPA filtration before return). The Airborne Infectious Isolation Rooms are designed for prevention against the airborne diseases. They have their predefined Heating, Ventilation and Air conditioning (HVAC) criteria given by CDC, IDPH and ASHRAE Standard 170. CDC regulations only specify 12 ach and do not have any criteria on temperature or humidity. Meanwhile, IDPH/ASHRAE Standard 170 has more detailed design criteria for HVAC systems. According to their regulations the isolation rooms must have the ability to maintain the room temperature around 70F to 75F, while keeping the relative humidity (rh) to be minimum of 30% during winters and maximum of 60% during summers. The specified airflow is 12 ach total/ 2 ach OA (Outdoor Air) and the pressure should be negative relative to the adjacent spaces. There are some architectural design requirements for the rooms such as walls should be slab to slab, plaster or drywall ceilings with sliding-self-closing doors are preferred with all the leakages sealed. The guidelines specified by CDC, IDPH/ASHRAE Standard 170 are focused on maintaining room temperatures within specified range, one thing to look into these conditions is how the relative humidity plays a role to effect the cooling systems used for maintaining the stringent temperature requirements. While the places with low relative humidity are perfectly fine with the evaporative cooling systems used in HVAC systems, but as the relative humidity pushes towards the higher ranges i.e. more than 60%, then the evaporative cooling systems fail miserably and have to be replaced with the refrigerated cooling systems. This is to be done to prevent the corrosive action of the moisture saturated on the corrosive surfaces of isolation rooms because evaporative cooling being slow in higher relative humidity areas will allow the more contact time between moisture and corrosive surfaces. For example, during the annual monsoon season in Arizona the cooling is going to be adversely affected due to high relative humidity.

Some states require the availability of such rooms in hospitals, emergency departments, and nursing homes that care for patients with M. tuberculosis. A respiratory protection program that includes education about use of respirators, fit-testing, and user seal checks is required in any facility with AIIRs. In settings where airborne precautions cannot be implemented due to limited engineering resources (e.g., physician offices), masking the patient, placing the patient in a private room (e.g., office examination room) with the door closed, and providing N95 or higher level respirators or masks if respirators are not available for healthcare personnel will reduce the likelihood of airborne transmission until the patient is either transferred to a facility with an AIIR or returned to the home environment, as deemed medically appropriate. Healthcare personnel caring for patients on airborne precautions wear a mask or respirator, depending on the disease-specific recommendations (Appendix A), that is donned prior to room entry. Whenever possible, non-immune HCWs should not care for patients with vaccine-preventable airborne diseases (e.g., measles, chickenpox, and smallpox).

== Syndromic and empirical use ==
Since the infecting agent often is not known at the time of admission to a healthcare facility, transmission-based precautions are used empirically, according to the clinical syndrome and the likely etiologic agents at the time, and then modified when the pathogen is identified or a transmissible infectious etiology is ruled out. Diagnosis of many infections requires laboratory confirmation. Since laboratory tests, especially those that depend on culture techniques, often require two or more days for completion, transmission-based precautions must be implemented while test results are pending based on the clinical presentation and likely pathogens. Use of appropriate transmission-based precautions at the time a patient develops symptoms or signs of transmissible infection, or arrives at a healthcare facility for care, reduces transmission opportunities. While it is not possible to identify prospectively all patients needing transmission-based precautions, certain clinical syndromes and conditions carry a sufficiently high risk to warrant their use empirically while confirmatory tests are pending.

Clinical syndrome or condition¹	Potential pathogens²	Empiric precautions (always include standard precautions)
Acute diarrhea with a likely infectious cause in an incontinent or diapered patient	Enteric pathogens include enterohemorrhagic Escherichia coli O157:H7, Shigella spp, hepatitis A virus, noroviruses, rotavirus, C. difficile	Contact precautions (pediatrics and adult)
Meningitis	Neisseria meningitidis	Droplet precautions for first 24 hrs of antimicrobial therapy; mask and face protection for intubation
Meningitis	Enteroviruses M. tuberculosis	Contact precautions for infants and children
Meningitis	M. tuberculosis	Airborne precautions if pulmonary infiltrate Airborne precautions plus contact precautions if potentially infectious draining body fluid present
RASH OR EXANTHEMS, GENERALIZED, ETIOLOGY UNKNOWN		
Petechial/ecchymotic with fever (general)	Neisseria meningitidis	Droplet precautions for first 24 hrs of antimicrobial therapy
Ebola, Lassa, Marburg viruses	Droplet precautions plus contact precautions, with face/eye protection, emphasizing safety sharps and barrier precautions when blood exposure likely. Use N95 or higher respiratory protection when aerosol-generating procedure performed	
Vesicular	Varicella-zoster, herpes simplex, variola	Airborne plus contact precautions;
Vesicular	(smallpox), vaccinia viruses	Contact precautions only if herpes simplex, localized zoster in an immunocompetent host or vaccinia viruses most likely
Maculopapular with cough, coryza and fever	Rubeola (measles) virus	Airborne precautions
RESPIRATORY INFECTIONS		
Cough/fever/upper lobe pulmonary infiltrate in an HIV-negative patient or a patient at low risk for human immunodeficiency virus (HIV) infection	M. tuberculosis, Respiratory viruses, S. pneumoniae, S. aureus (MSSA or MRSA)	Airborne precautions plus contact precautions
Cough/fever/pulmonary infiltrate in any lung location in an HIV-infected patient or a patient at high risk for HIV infection	M. tuberculosis, Respiratory viruses, S. pneumoniae, S. aureus (MSSA or MRSA)	Airborne precautions plus contact precautions. Use eye/face protection if aerosol-generating procedure performed or contact with respiratory secretions anticipated. If tuberculosis is unlikely and there are no AIIRs and/or respirators available, use droplet precautions instead of airborne precautions Tuberculosis more likely in HIV-infected individual than in HIV-negative individual
Cough/fever/pulmonary infiltrate in any lung location in a patient with a history of recent travel (10–21 days) to countries with active outbreaks of SARS, avian influenza	M. tuberculosis, severe acute respiratory syndrome virus (SARS-CoV), avian influenza	Airborne plus contact precautions plus eye protection. If SARS and tuberculosis unlikely, use droplet precautions instead of airborne precautions.
Respiratory infections, particularly bronchiolitis and pneumonia, in infants and young children	Respiratory syncytial virus, parainfluenza virus, adenovirus, influenza virus, Human metapneumovirus	Contact plus droplet precautions; droplet precautions may be discontinued when adenovirus and influenza have been ruled out.
Skin or Wound Infection		
Abscess or draining wound that cannot be covered	Staphylococcus aureus (MSSA or MRSA), group A streptococcus	Contact precautions. Add droplet precautions for the first 24 hours of appropriate antimicrobial therapy if invasive Group A streptococcal disease is suspected.

¹ Patients with the syndromes or conditions listed below may present with atypical signs or symptoms (e.g.neonates and adults with pertussis may not have paroxysmal or severe cough). The clinician's index of suspicion should be guided by the prevalence of specific conditions in the community, as well as clinical judgment.

² The organisms listed under the column "Potential pathogens" are not intended to represent the complete, or even most likely, diagnoses, but rather possible etiologic agents that require additional precautions beyond standard precautions until they can be ruled out.

== Recommendations for specific infections ==
Following are recommendations for transmission-based precautions for specific infections per the US Healthcare Infection Control Practices Advisory Committee as of 2007.

Infection or condition	Precautions type¹	Precautions duration²	Precautions comments
Abscess draining, major	C	DI	No dressing or containment of drainage; until drainage stops or can be contained by dressing
Clostridioides difficile	C	DI	Discontinue antibiotics if appropriate. Do not share electronic thermometers; ensure consistent environmental cleaning and disinfection. Hypochlorite solutions may be required for cleaning if transmission continues. Handwashing with soap and water preferred because of the absence of sporicidal activity of alcohol in waterless antiseptic handrubs
Acute viral (acute hemorrhagic)	C	DI	Adenovirus most common; enterovirus, Coxsackie virus A) also associated with community outbreaks. Highly contagious; outbreaks in eye clinics, pediatric and neonatal settings, institutional settings reported. Eye clinics should follow standard precautions when handling patients with conjunctivitis. Routine use of infection control measures in the handling of instruments and equipment will prevent the occurrence of outbreaks in this and other settings.
Diphtheria pharyngeal	D	CN	Until 2 cultures taken 24 hrs. apart negative
Diphtheria cutaneous	C	CN	Until 2 cultures taken 24 hrs. apart negative
Furunculosis, staphylococcal Infants and young children	C	DI	
Rotavirus	C	DI	Ensure consistent environmental cleaning and disinfection and frequent removal of soiled diapers. Prolonged shedding may occur in both immunocompetent and immunocompromised children and the elderly
Hepatitis, viral Type A Diapered or incontinent patients	C		Maintain contact precautions in infants and children <3 years of age for duration of hospitalization; for children 3-14 yrs. of age for 2 weeks after onset of symptoms; >14 yrs. of age for 1 week after onset of symptoms.
Herpes zoster (varicella-zoster) (shingles) Disseminated disease in any patient Localized disease in immunocompromised patient until disseminated infection ruled out	A, C	DI	Susceptible HCWs should not enter room if immune caregivers are available; no recommendation for protection of immune HCWs; no recommendation for type of protection, i.e. surgical mask or respirator; for susceptible HCWs.
Impetigo	C	U24 hrs	
Influenza human (seasonal influenza)	D	5 days except DI in immunocompromised persons	Single patient room when available or cohort; avoid placement with high-risk patients; mask patient when transported out of room; chemoprophylaxis/vaccine to control/prevent outbreaks. Use gown and gloves according to standard precautions may be especially important in pediatric settings. Duration of precautions for immunocompromised patients cannot be defined; prolonged duration of viral shedding (i.e. for several weeks) has been observed; implications for transmission are unknown.
Influenza Avian (e.g. H5N1, H7, H9 strains)			See www.cdc.gov/flu/avian/professional/infect-control.htm for current avian influenza guidance.
Pandemic influenza (also a human influenza virus)	D	5 days from onset of symptoms	See http://www.pandemicflu.gov for current pandemic influenza guidance.
Lice head (pediculosis)	C	U 24 hrs	
Measles (rubeola)	A	4 days after onset of rash; DI in immune compromised	Susceptible HCWs should not enter room if immune care providers are available; no recommendation for face protection for immune HCW; no recommendation for type of face protection for susceptible HCWs, i.e., mask or respirator. For exposed susceptibles, post-exposure vaccine within 72 hrs. or immune globulin within 6 days when available. Place exposed susceptible patients on Airborne precautions and exclude susceptible health care personnel from duty from day 5 after first exposure to day 21 after last exposure, regardless of post-exposure vaccine.
Monkeypox	A, C	A-Until monkeypox confirmed and smallpox excluded C-Until lesions crusted	Use See www.cdc.gov/ncidod/monkeypox for most current recommendations. Transmission in hospital settings unlikely. Pre- and post-exposure smallpox vaccine recommended for exposed HCWs
Multidrug-resistant organisms (MDROs), infection or colonization (e.g., MRSA, VRE, VISA/VRSA, ESBLs, resistant S. pneumoniae)	S/C		MDROs judged by the infection control program, based on local, state, regional, or national recommendations, to be of clinical and epidemiologic significance. Contact precautions recommended in settings with evidence of ongoing transmission, acute care settings with increased risk for transmission or wounds that cannot be contained by dressings. See recommendations for management options in Management of Multidrug-Resistant Organisms In Healthcare Settings, 2006. Contact state health department for guidance regarding new or emerging MDRO.
Mumps (infectious parotitis)	D	U 9 days	After onset of swelling; susceptible HCWs should not provide care if immune caregivers are available. Note: (Recent assessment of outbreaks in healthy 18- to 24-year-olds has indicated that salivary viral shedding occurred early in the course of illness and that 5 days of isolation after onset of parotitis may be appropriate in community settings; however the implications for healthcare personnel and high-risk patient populations remain to be clarified.)
Parvovirus B19 (Erythema infectiosum)	D		Maintain precautions for duration of hospitalization when chronic disease occurs in an immunocompromised patient. For patients with transient aplastic crisis or red-cell crisis, maintain precautions for 7 days. Duration of precautions for immunosuppressed patients with persistently positive PCR not defined, but transmission has occurred.
Pertussis (whooping cough)	D	U 5 days	Single patient room preferred. Cohorting an option. Post-exposure chemoprophylaxis for household contacts and HCWs with prolonged exposure to respiratory secretions. Recommendations for Tdap vaccine in adults under development.
Plague (Yersinia pestis) Bubonic	S		
Plague (Yersinia pestis) Pneumonic	D	U 48 hrs	Antimicrobial prophylaxis for exposed HCW.
Pneumonia Adenovirus	D, C	DI	Outbreaks in pediatric and institutional settings reported. In immunocompromised hosts, extend duration of droplet and contact precautions due to prolonged shedding of virus
Rubella (German measles) ( also see congenital rubella)	D	U 7 days after onset of rash	Susceptible HCWs should not enter room if immune caregivers are available. No recommendation for wearing face protection (e.g., a surgical mask) if immune. Pregnant women who are not immune should not care for these patients. Administer vaccine within three days of exposure to non-pregnant susceptible individuals. Place exposed susceptible patients on Droplet Precautions; exclude susceptible healthcare personnel from duty from day 5 after first exposure to day 21 after last exposure, regardless of post-exposure vaccine
Severe acute respiratory syndrome (SARS)	A, D, C	DI plus 10 days after resolution of fever, provided respiratory symptoms are absent or improving	Airborne Precautions preferred; D if AIIR unavailable. N95 or higher respiratory protection; surgical mask if N95 unavailable; eye protection (goggles, face shield); aerosol-generating procedures and "supershedders" highest risk for transmission via small droplet nuclei and large droplets. Vigilant environmental disinfection (see www.cdc.gov/ncidod/sars)
Smallpox	A, C	DI	Until all scabs have crusted and separated (3–4 weeks). Non-vaccinated HCWs should not provide care when immune HCWs are available; N95 or higher respiratory protection for susceptible and successfully vaccinated individuals; post-exposure vaccine within 4 days of exposure protective.
Streptococcal disease (group A streptococcus) Skin, wound, or burn major	C, D	U 24 hrs	No dressing or dressing does not contain drainage adequately
Tuberculosis (M. tuberculosis) Extrapulmonary, draining lesion)	A, C		Discontinue precautions only when patient is improving clinically, and drainage has ceased or there are three consecutive negative cultures of continued drainage. Examine for evidence of active pulmonary tuberculosis.
Tuberculosis (M. tuberculosis) Pulmonary or laryngeal disease, confirmed	A		Discontinue precautions only when patient on effective therapy is improving clinically and has three consecutive sputum smears negative for acid-fast bacilli collected on separate days(MMWR 2005; 54: RR-17 https://www.cdc.gov/mmwr/preview/mmwrhtml/rr5417a1.htm?s_cid=rr5417a1_e ) 12.
Varicella Zoster	A, C	Until lesions dry and crusted	Susceptible HCWs should not enter room if immune caregivers are available; no recommendation for face protection of immune HCWs; no recommendation for type of protection, i.e. surgical mask or respirator for susceptible HCWs. In immunocompromised host with varicella pneumonia, prolong duration of precautions for duration of illness. Post-exposure prophylaxis: provide post-exposure vaccine ASAP but within 120 hours; for susceptible exposed persons for whom vaccine is contraindicated (immunocompromised persons, pregnant women, newborns whose mother's varicella onset is <5 days before delivery or within 48 hrs after delivery) provide VZIG, when available, within 96 hours; if unavailable, use IVIG, Use Airborne Precautions for exposed susceptible persons and exclude exposed susceptible healthcare workers beginning 8 days after first exposure until 21 days after last exposure or 28 if received VZIG, regardless of postexposure vaccination.
Viral hemorrhagic fevers due to Lassa, Ebola, Marburg, Crimean-Congo fever viruses	S, D, C	DI	Single-patient room preferred. Emphasize: 1) use of sharps safety devices and safe work practices, 2) hand hygiene; 3) barrier protection against blood and body fluids upon entry into room (single gloves and fluid-resistant or impermeable gown, face/eye protection with masks, goggles or face shields); and 4) appropriate waste handling. Use N95 or higher respirators when performing aerosol-generating procedures. Largest viral load in final stages of illness when hemorrhage may occur; additional PPE, including double gloves, leg and shoe coverings may be used, especially in resource-limited settings where options for cleaning and laundry are limited. Notify public health officials immediately if Ebola is suspected

1 Type of precautions: A, airborne; C, contact; D, droplet; S, standard; when A, C, and D are specified, also use S.

² Duration of precautions: CN, until off antimicrobial treatment and culture-negative; DI, duration of illness (with wound lesions, DI means until wounds stop draining); DE, until environment completely decontaminated; U, until time specified in hours (hrs) after initiation of effective therapy; Unknown: criteria for establishing eradication of pathogen has not been determined

== Discontinuation ==
Transmission-based precautions remain in effect for limited periods of time (i.e., while the risk for transmission of the infectious agent persists or for the duration of the illness (Appendix A). For most infectious diseases, this duration reflects known patterns of persistence and shedding of infectious agents associated with the natural history of the infectious process and its treatment. For some diseases (e.g., pharyngeal or cutaneous diphtheria, RSV), transmission-based precautions remain in effect until culture or antigen-detection test results document eradication of the pathogen and, for RSV, symptomatic disease is resolved. For other diseases, (e.g., M. tuberculosis) state laws and regulations, and healthcare facility policies, may dictate the duration of precautions 12). In immunocompromised patients, viral shedding can persist for prolonged periods of time (many weeks to months) and transmission to others may occur during that time; therefore, the duration of contact and/or droplet precautions may be prolonged for many weeks. The duration of contact precautions for patients who are colonized or infected with MDROs remains undefined. MRSA is the only MDRO for which effective decolonization regimens are available. However, carriers of MRSA who have negative nasal cultures after a course of systemic or topical therapy may resume shedding MRSA in the weeks that follow therapy. Although early guidelines for VRE suggested discontinuation of contact precautions after three stool cultures obtained at weekly intervals proved negative, subsequent experiences have indicated that such screening may fail to detect colonization that can persist for >1 year. Likewise, available data indicate that colonization with VRE, MRSA, and possibly MDR-GNB, can persist for many months, especially in the presence of severe underlying disease, invasive devices, and recurrent courses of antimicrobial agents. It may be prudent to assume that MDRO carriers are colonized permanently and manage them accordingly. Alternatively, an interval free of hospitalizations, antimicrobial therapy, and invasive devices (e.g., 6 or 12 months) before reculturing patients to document clearance of carriage may be used. Determination of the best strategy awaits the results of additional studies. See the 2006 HICPAC/CDC MDRO guideline for discussion of possible criteria to discontinue contact precautions for patients colonized or infected with MDROs.

== Application in ambulatory and home care settings ==
Although transmission-based precautions generally apply in all healthcare settings, exceptions exist. For example, in home care, AIIRs are not available. Furthermore, family members already exposed to diseases such as varicella and tuberculosis would not use masks or respiratory protection, but visiting HCWs would need to use such protection. Similarly, management of patients colonized or infected with MDROs may necessitate contact precautions in acute care hospitals and in some LTCFs when there is continued transmission, but the risk of transmission in ambulatory care and home care, has not been defined. Consistent use of standard precautions may suffice in these settings, but more information is needed.

Patients requiring outpatient services with known airborne or droplet transmitted diseases should be scheduled at the end of the day to minimize exposure to other patients. These patients should also be educated on proper respiratory etiquette - coughing into their elbow and wearing a mask. Healthcare professionals should also wear proper PPE when anticipating contact with these patients.

Patients with known contact transmitted diseases coming into ambulatory clinics should be triaged quickly and placed in a private room. Items used in these rooms should not be taken out of the room unless properly sanitized. Healthcare workers must practice proper hand hygiene when exiting the private room.

Patients placed in long-term care facilities should be placed in single rooms, have access to their own items or use disposable items, and should have limited contact with other residents, in order to reduce the spread of contact transmitted diseases. For patients with airborne and droplet transmitted diseases in long-term care facilities, they should wear masks when around other residents, and proper PPE and standard precautions should be maintained throughout facilities. In addition, residents of long-term care facilities who are identified as at-risk for these diseases should be immunized if possible.

== Side effects ==
When transmission-based precautions are indicated, efforts must be made to counteract possible adverse effects on patients (i.e., anxiety, depression and other mood disturbances, perceptions of stigma, reduced contact with clinical staff, and increases in preventable adverse events in order to improve acceptance by the patients and adherence by health care workers).
