= Gustav Adolf Neuber =

German surgeon (1850–1932)

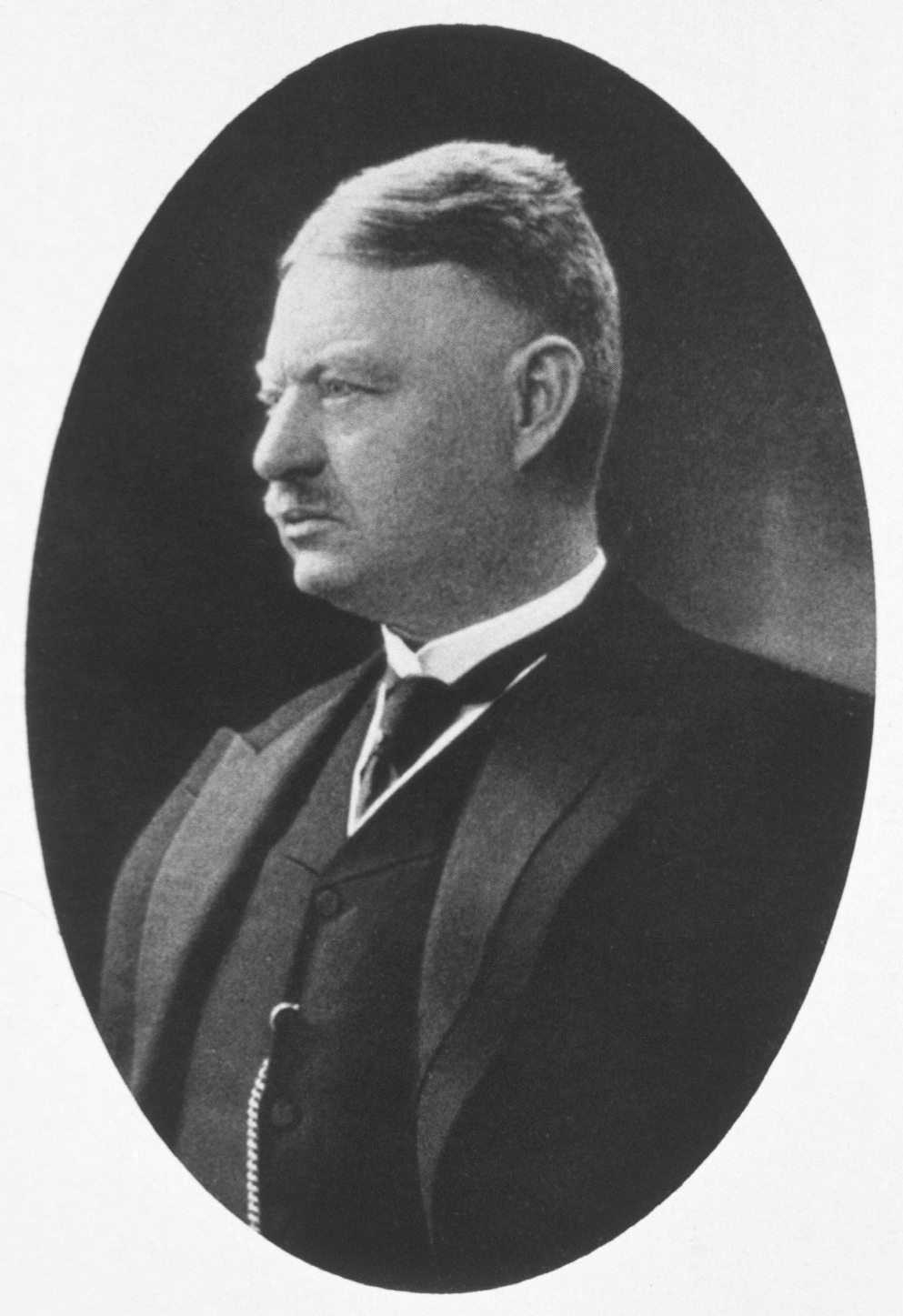
Neuber c. 1900

Gustav Adolf Neuber (24 June 1850 – 13 April 1932) was a German surgeon born in Tondern (now Tønder).

He studied medicine in several universities, receiving his doctorate in 1875 at the University of Giessen. Later he worked as an assistant to Friedrich von Esmarch (1823–1908) at the University Surgical Clinic in Kiel.

In 1884, he first proposed the use of separate operating rooms for septic and non-septic surgery, emphasizing the need for complete cleanliness in all aspects of surgery. In 1886, he opened his own private hospital on Königsweg in Kiel, where he implemented modern principles of asepsis. Neuber's clinic in Kiel is considered to be the first aseptic hospital in the world.

In 1879, he developed a "decalcified bone tube" for wound drainage. In the field of plastic surgery, he introduced a procedure for "fat auto-grafting".

== Selected writings ==
- Anleitung zur Technik der antiseptischen Wundbehandlung und des Dauerverbandes, 1883 - Instructions on the technique of antiseptic wound treatment.
- Vorschläge zur Beseitigung der Drainage für alle frischen Wunden, 1884 - Treatise on wound drainage.
- Die aseptische Wundbehandlung in meinen chirurgischen Privat-Hospitälern, 1886 - Aseptic wound treatment in my private surgical hospital.
