= Barrier nursing =

Archaic nursing term

Barrier nursing is a set of stringent infection control techniques used in nursing. The aim of barrier nursing is to protect medical staff against infection by patients and also protect patients with highly infectious diseases from spreading their pathogens to other non-infected people.

Barrier nursing was created as a means to maximize isolation care. Since it is impossible to isolate a patient from society and medical staff while still providing care, there are often compromises made when it comes to treating infectious patients. Barrier nursing is a method to regulate and minimize the number and severity of compromises being made in isolation care, while also preventing the disease from spreading.

== History and usage ==
The term "barrier nursing" was first used by the Centre for Disease Control (CDC) to describe early infection control methods in the late 1800s. From the mid-1900s to early 2000s, 15 new terms had emerged and were also being used to describe infection control. The variety of terms that described infection care led to a misunderstanding of practice recommendations and eventual low adherence to isolation precautions; this eventually forced the CDC to combine all 15 terms into one term called isolation. Nowadays barrier nursing is becoming a less commonly used term and is not even recognized by most reputable databases or online scientific journals. Yet when it is seldom used, it relates mostly to circumstantial protocols for situations regarding isolation health care.

== Simple vs strict barrier nursing ==
=== Simple barrier nursing ===
Simple barrier nursing is used when an infectious agent is suspected within a patient and standard precautions aren't working. Simple barrier nursing consists of utilizing sterile: gloves, masks, gowns, head-covers and eye protection. Nurses also wear personal protective equipment (PPE) to protect their bodies from infectious agents. Simple barrier nursing is often used for marrow transplants, human Lassa virus transmission, viral hemorrhagic fever and other virulent diseases.

=== Strict barrier nursing ===
Strict, or rigid, barrier nursing is used for the rarer and more specific deadly viruses and infections: Ebola and rabies. Strict barrier nursing is a lot more demanding in terms of safety measure requirements because of the catastrophic effects that can occur if the disease or virus is allowed through the barrier. If patients cannot be isolated from one another completely, they have to at least be isolated from the rest of the patients within the hospital. In strict barrier nursing the patients and staff are usually isolated from the common population, and every attempt is made to establish a barrier between the inside and outside of the ward. The staff going on duty have to remove all outer clothing, pass through an airlock and put on a new set of PPE. When a staff member is going off duty, they are required to take a thorough shower and leave everything that was taken into the room to be disinfected or destroyed. While strict barrier nursing methods cannot always be enforced, especially in lower income areas and countries, any modifications made must be based on sound principles. Since infection can be spread through fomites, clothes or oxygen, all efforts must be made to limit the spread of these vessels. The doctor's or nurse's hands must be thoroughly washed after touching anything in the cubicle. Taps and door-handles should be elbow- or foot-operated. Hands should be washed in the cubicle and dried outside to eliminate contamination from paper or cloth towels. In addition, antiseptic hand-cream, dispensed from a foot-operated wall container would also serve as an additional precaution.

== Psychiatric effects of barrier nursing ==
=== Positive effects ===
- Older patients and patients with more experience are content with their situation and approach it with more positivity.
- Some patients enjoy the experience of privacy and quietness that a single barrier room provides.

=== Negative effects ===
- Barrier nursing/isolation influences the quality of care and opportunity for emotional support of the patient.
- Barrier nursing imposes barriers on the expression of a patient's own identity and any normal interpersonal relationships that he/she may have.
- Barrier nursing can lead to anxiety, anger, frustration and fear especially if the patient isn't given enough information, or incorrect information on their disease.
- Barrier nursing equipment can sometimes aggravate the social stigma associated with their infectious disease.

Although participants understood the importance for Personalized Protective equipment, they still found that its use increased their fear and sense of stigma.

- Placing patients in barrier nursing rooms may expose them to less medical care or access to associated treatment.

Many researchers have indicated that healthcare professionals may regard a patient in source isolation differently from others. In studies regarding barrier nursing of patients with methicillin-resistant Staphylococcus aureus, medical staff admitted to spending less time with patients in source isolation.

=== Solutions to negative effects of barrier nursing/isolation ===
- Empowering patients with accurate and meaningful information about their disease as a means of coping with their experience.
- Providing accurate information for family and visitors in order to ensure or reduce their initial ill‑informed fear of becoming infected.
- Ensuring patients have access to a telephone as a means of communication with the outside world.
- Designing facilities with windows and free space that allow patients to see the outside world and mitigate their feelings of confinement.
