= Body substance isolation =

Body substance isolation (BSI) is a practice of isolating all body substances (blood, urine, feces, tears, etc.) of individuals undergoing medical treatment, particularly emergency medical treatment of those who might be infected with illnesses such as HIV or hepatitis so as to reduce as much as possible the chances of transmitting these illnesses. This technique was first implemented at Harborview Medical Center in Seattle, Washington. BSI is similar in nature to universal precautions, but goes further in isolating workers from pathogens, including substances now known to carry HIV.

== Place of body substance isolation practice in history ==
Universal precautions were introduced by the Center for Disease Control and Prevention in 1985 in response to the HIV epidemic. In 1987, these guidelines were adjusted by a set of rules known as body substance isolation. In 1996, core elements of both universal precautions and BSI were integrated into a practice known as standard precautions.

BSI went further than universal precautions in isolating workers from pathogens, including substances now currently known to carry HIV. These pathogens fall into two broad categories, blood-borne (carried in the body fluids) and airborne. The practice of BSI was common in pre-hospital care and emergency medical services due to the often unknown nature of the patient and their disease or medical conditions. It was a part of the National Standards Curriculum for Prehospital Providers and Firefighters. Types of body substance isolation included:

- Hospital gowns
- Medical gloves
- Shoe covers
- Surgical mask or N95 Respirator
- Safety Glasses

It was postulated that BSI precautions should be practiced in an environment where treaters were exposed to bodily fluids, such as:

- blood, semen, preseminal fluid, vaginal secretions, synovial fluid, amniotic fluid, cerebrospinal fluid, pleural fluid, peritoneal fluid, marrow, pericardial fluid, feces, nasal secretions, urine, vomitus, sputum, mucus, cervical mucus, phlegm, saliva, breastmilk, colostrum, and secretions and blood from the umbilical cord

Such infection control techniques that were recommended following the AIDS outbreak in the 1980s. Every patient was treated as if infected, and therefore precautions were taken to minimize risk. Other conditions which called for minimizing risks with BSI:

- Diseases with air-borne transmission (e.g., tuberculosis)
- Diseases with droplet transmission (e.g., mumps, rubella, influenza, pertussis)
- Transmission by direct or indirect contact with dried skin (e.g., colonisation with MRSA) or contaminated surfaces
- Prion diseases (e.g., Creutzfeldt-Jakob disease)

or any combination of the above.

== See also ==
- Barrier nursing
