= Central sterile services department =

Healthcare discipline for reprocessing reusable medical devices

Sterile processing / services
- Sterile surgical instruments prepared for clinical use

Occupation
- Occupation type: Healthcare occupation
- Activity sectors: Healthcare; medical device reprocessing; infection prevention and control

Description
- Competencies: Decontamination; medical-device identification, inspection, and assembly; sterile packaging; sterilization; process monitoring; quality control; traceability; logistics and distribution; validation
- Education required: Varies by country and role; may include workplace training, vocational qualifications, apprenticeships, professional certification, or higher education
- Fields of employment: Hospitals; surgical centers; dental facilities; centralized and off-site sterile processing facilities; mobile sterile processing units
- Related jobs: Sterile processing technician; sterile services technician; central service technician; decontamination technician; healthcare scientist

Sterile processing, also known as sterile services, is the healthcare discipline concerned with the decontamination, reprocessing, and resupply of reusable medical devices, principally surgical instruments. Facilities carrying out these functions use department names including sterile processing department (SPD), sterile services department (SSD), central sterile services department (CSSD), central sterile processing department (CSPD), and hospital sterilization and disinfection unit (HSDU), as well as variations of these terms.

Sterile processing as a centralized model and distinct discipline emerged in response to variation in decentralized ward and operating theater sterilization practices and the need for standardized process control to ensure patient safety. Developing principally in the United States and United Kingdom during the mid-20th century, centralized departments subsequently expanded internationally alongside specialist equipment, quality systems, harmonized international standards, electronic traceability, and formalized professional credentialing.

Across healthcare systems, the World Health Organization (WHO) defines the reprocessing pathway to encompass collection and transport of used devices, cleaning, disinfection, inspection, assembly, packaging, sterilization where required, storage, distribution, and traceability. These controlled, mechanized processes are designed to provide repeatable decontamination and reduce the risk of surgical-site and other healthcare-associated infections. Reprocessed inventory ranges from standard surgical trays and dental instruments to minimally invasive and robotic surgery instruments, reusable endoscopes, and anesthetic equipment.

Personnel working in the field are commonly designated as sterile processing or sterile services technicians, alongside decontamination and healthcare-science roles in certain jurisdictions. In the 21st century, the discipline has undergone increasing professionalization through competency frameworks, vocational and academic education, and certification, although regulatory recognition as health professionals varies globally.

== Scope and principles ==
=== Terminology and scope ===
Terminology varies across countries and healthcare systems. The World Health Organization (WHO) uses the term sterile services department (SSD), while central sterile services department, sterile processing department, central sterile processing department, and central service department are widely used. Additional terms include sterile processing unit, often used for off-site regional reprocessing facilities, and hospital sterilization and disinfection unit (HSDU). Facilities dedicated exclusively to reprocessing flexible endoscopes are frequently designated as endoscope processing units (EPUs) or endoscopy decontamination units (EDUs).

Sterile processing primarily concerns reusable medical devices and patient-care equipment, including surgical instruments and instrument sets, dental instruments, obstetric delivery sets, rigid and flexible endoscopes, and respiratory and anesthetic equipment. The required level of processing depends on the device's intended clinical use, physical geometry, material compatibility, and the manufacturer's validated instructions for use (IFUs).

Assigned departmental functions typically encompass the receipt and transport of soiled devices, cleaning, disinfection, inspection, assembly, packaging, sterilization, storage, distribution, traceability documentation, and quality control. Sterilization is the terminal stage of reprocessing rather than a substitute for preceding steps; thorough cleaning is essential prior to disinfection or sterilization because retained organic and inorganic soil can shield microorganisms and inhibit microbial inactivation.

=== Risk-based reprocessing ===
The Spaulding classification, developed by American physician Earle H. Spaulding, categorizes medical devices according to the infection risk associated with their clinical use. It divides devices into critical, semicritical, and noncritical categories:

- Critical devices enter sterile tissue or the vascular system (such as surgical instruments and cardiac catheters) and require sterilization.
- Semicritical devices contact mucous membranes or non-intact skin (such as flexible endoscopes and respiratory therapy equipment) and require at least high-level disinfection.
- Noncritical devices contact intact skin (such as blood pressure cuffs and stethoscopes) and require cleaning followed by low- or intermediate-level disinfection.

Device design, material compatibility, intended clinical application, and the manufacturer's validated reprocessing instructions govern the specific chemical or thermal parameters applied.

== Reprocessing cycle ==
The reprocessing cycle consists of sequential stages progressing unidirectionally from contaminated to sterile zones.

=== Collection and transport ===
Point-of-use preparation involves removing gross soil immediately after clinical use and keeping instruments moist to prevent blood, protein, and biofilm from drying onto surfaces. Contaminated devices are placed in closed, puncture-resistant, and leak-proof containers or carts for safe transport from clinical areas to the decontamination zone.

=== Cleaning and disinfection ===
Washer-disinfectors at AZ Sint-Maarten in Mechelen, Belgium.

Cleaning removes visible soil, blood, protein, and other bioburden using water, enzymatic or alkaline detergents, and mechanical action. Complex lumened, micro-cannulated, or hinged devices—such as minimally invasive and robotic instruments—often require manual brushing and flushing, followed by ultrasonic cleaning to dislodge debris from inaccessible crevices via acoustic cavitation. Most reusable surgical instruments are then processed in automated washer-disinfectors, which perform cold pre-rinses, detergent washes, thermal disinfection rinses (commonly at 90 °C (194 °F)), and drying cycles in accordance with ISO 15883.

The lethality of thermal disinfection is quantified using the A_{0} value, which represents the equivalent disinfection time in seconds at 80 °C (176 °F) based on a specified temperature coefficient (z-value). ISO 15883 uses A_{0} thresholds (such as A_{0} 600 for noncritical/semicritical items and A_{0} 3000 for surgical instruments) to verify accumulated thermal microbial reduction during washer-disinfector cycles.

=== Inspection, assembly, and packaging ===
Dental pliers inside and beside transparent sterile packaging.

After thermal disinfection, instruments are transferred to a clean preparation area or designated cleanroom where technicians inspect them—frequently using illuminated magnifiers and borescopes for internal channels—for residual debris, protein residue, corrosion, alignment, and mechanical function. Devices are reconciled and assembled into standardized surgical sets, accompanied by internal chemical indicators, and enclosed within a sterile barrier system using sterilization wrap, peel pouches, or rigid sterilization containers fitted with microbial filters.

=== Sterilization ===
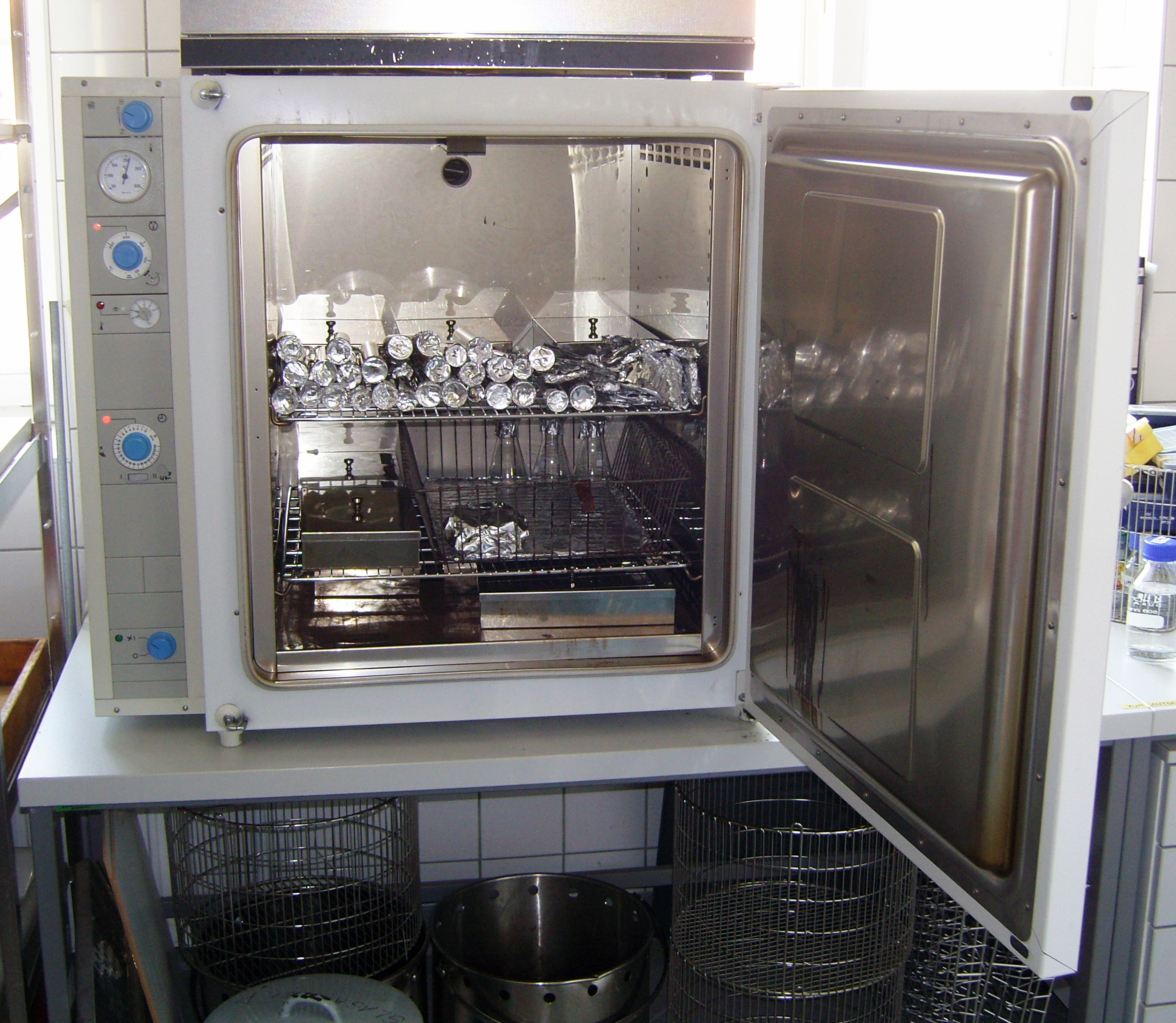
An open steam sterilizer showing the sterilization chamber.

Packaged loads are sterilized to achieve a sterility assurance level (SAL) of 10^{−6}, representing a probability of no more than one in a million of a viable microorganism surviving on an item. Heat-tolerant devices are processed via pressurized saturated steam in a prevacuum autoclave—typically at 132 °C (270 °F) for 4 minutes in North American practice or 134 °C (273 °F) for 3 to 18 minutes in European and British frameworks, or at 121 °C (250 °F) for longer holding periods. Heat- and moisture-sensitive devices, such as flexible endoscopes, cameras, and powered surgical handpieces, are processed using low-temperature modalities, including vaporized hydrogen peroxide (VHP), ethylene oxide (EtO), or low-temperature steam and formaldehyde.

=== Monitoring, storage, and distribution ===
Sterilization cycles are verified through a combination of physical parameter printouts (time, temperature, and pressure), external and internal chemical indicators, air-removal tests (such as Bowie-Dick or process challenge devices), and biological indicators containing resistant bacterial spores—specifically Geobacillus stearothermophilus for steam and VHP, and Bacillus atrophaeus for EtO. Released sterile packs are cooled to ambient temperature and stored in climate-controlled, restricted-access areas before distribution to operating rooms and clinical wards.

== History ==
=== Development of asepsis and sterilization ===
The development of sterile processing followed advances in microbiology and surgical practice during the 19th century. Ignaz Semmelweis demonstrated during the 1840s that hand disinfection by medical personnel significantly reduced mortality from puerperal fever, while Louis Pasteur's research established the germ theory of disease.

Joseph Lister applied germ theory to surgical practice in 1867 by introducing carbolic acid antiseptic techniques to prevent wound sepsis.

Surgical instruments associated with Joseph Lister.

By the late 19th century, surgical practice shifted from chemical antisepsis toward asepsis, emphasizing the exclusion of microorganisms from instruments, dressings, and the operative field. French microbiologist Charles Chamberland, working in Pasteur's laboratory, developed the pressurized-steam autoclave in 1879, enabling reliable thermal sterilization of surgical instruments and textiles.

An early Chamberland autoclave. Pressurized-steam sterilization developed during the late 19th century.

=== Centralization and mid-20th-century pioneers ===
During the first half of the 20th century, instrument preparation and sterilization remained decentralized across hospital wards and operating departments. Central service departments first emerged in the United States during the interwar and post-war periods to consolidate surgical supply, dressings, and sterilization under dedicated supervision. By the early 1960s, American central sterile supply departments had reached an advanced operational model that served as a reference point for international hospital planners.

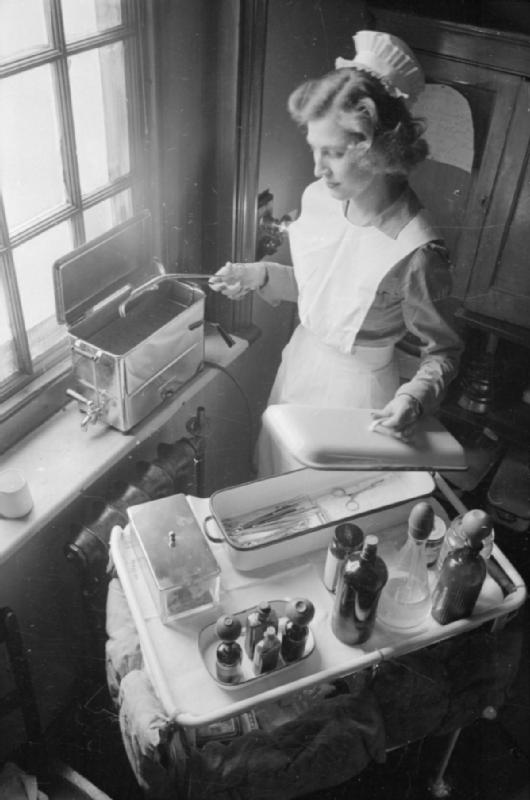
A nurse prepares sterilized surgical instruments at Park Prewett Hospital in England in 1941. Hospital instrument sterilization preceded the post-war development of centralized sterile supply departments.

In the United Kingdom, the post-war reorganization of hospitals following the 1948 establishment of the National Health Service (NHS) catalyzed systematic operational research into centralized sterilization. Following early military implementations by the British Army at Cambridge Military Hospital in Aldershot from 1955, the Nuffield Provincial Hospitals Trust conducted a landmark five-year investigation—including an experimental CSSD at Musgrave Park Hospital in Belfast—culminating in its 1958 and 1963 reports. Alongside the British Ministry of Health's 1961 Hospital Building Note No. 13, these studies codified foundational architectural and operational principles—including unidirectional workflow separation, unit packaging, and hospital-group centralization—that influenced sterile services design internationally.

Simultaneously, the Medical Research Council's 1959 investigation exposed widespread failures in hospital steam sterilizers regarding air removal and operator training. This prompted J. H. Bowie, J. C. Kelsey, and G. R. Thompson in 1963 to publish the Bowie and Dick autoclave tape test in The Lancet, establishing an international standard for daily air-removal verification in high-vacuum steam sterilizers.

=== Global expansion and late-20th-century evolution ===
From the late 1960s onward, centralized sterile processing expanded across Europe, Asia, and Oceania as surgical complexity increased and bloodborne pathogens (such as HIV and hepatitis B and C) and transmissible spongiform encephalopathies (such as variant Creutzfeldt–Jakob disease) drove stricter decontamination and protein-residue controls.

A 20th-century sterilization room at Sahlgrenska Hospital in Gothenburg, Sweden, showing sinks and earlier sterilization equipment.

In France, hospital modernization from the late 1960s promoted centralized sterilization, leading to the 1972 founding of a national sterilization society. In Japan, The University of Osaka Hospital established a centralized CSSD in 1971 that later integrated flexible endoscope and robotic instrument reprocessing. The Netherlands enacted national sterilization standards in the 1980s, while Australia and New Zealand established rigorous zoning, water-quality, and traceability mandates under AS/NZS 4187 (superseded by AS 5369:2023). Globally, the World Health Organization expanded earlier Pan American Health Organization manuals into comprehensive international guidance in 2016 to harmonize practices across varying resource settings.

== Facilities, equipment, and technology ==
=== Service design and environmental control ===
Reusable dental instruments loaded into a washer-disinfector for automated cleaning and thermal disinfection.

Modern sterile processing departments use physical and environmental segregation—typically divided into three distinct zones (decontamination, clean inspection/assembly/packaging, and sterile storage)—to prevent cross-contamination. Early architectural templates such as the 1961 British Ministry of Health guidance established this linear progression, which contemporary standards reinforce with pass-through washer-disinfectors and double-ended sterilizers acting as physical barriers between zones.

Contamination control relies on directional airflow, pressure differentials (negative pressure in decontamination areas relative to adjacent corridors, and positive pressure in clean packing and sterile storage rooms), controlled temperature and humidity, and purified water quality (such as reverse-osmosis water for final thermal rinses and steam generation). While clean inspection and packing zones incorporate HEPA-filtered air via an air handling unit and may be classified under the ISO 14644 series where specified, an entire sterile processing department is not necessarily classified as a cleanroom. Facilities operate across diverse delivery models, including hospital-based departments, off-site centralized hubs serving multiple healthcare networks, and mobile reprocessing units.

=== Equipment and industry ===
Sterile processing relies on specialized capital equipment—including ultrasonic cleaners, automated washer-disinfectors, drying cabinets, illuminated magnification and borescope inspection stations, heat sealers, prevacuum steam and low-temperature sterilizers, water-purification plants, and electronic tracking hardware—manufactured by medical-technology companies such as STERIS, Getinge, and B. Braun. Supporting consumables include enzymatic detergents, sterile barrier packaging, chemical and biological indicators, and validation test devices.

=== Traceability and documentation ===
Traceability systems reconstruct the reprocessing history, cycle parameters, operator actions, and patient-level clinical use of reusable surgical instruments and trays.

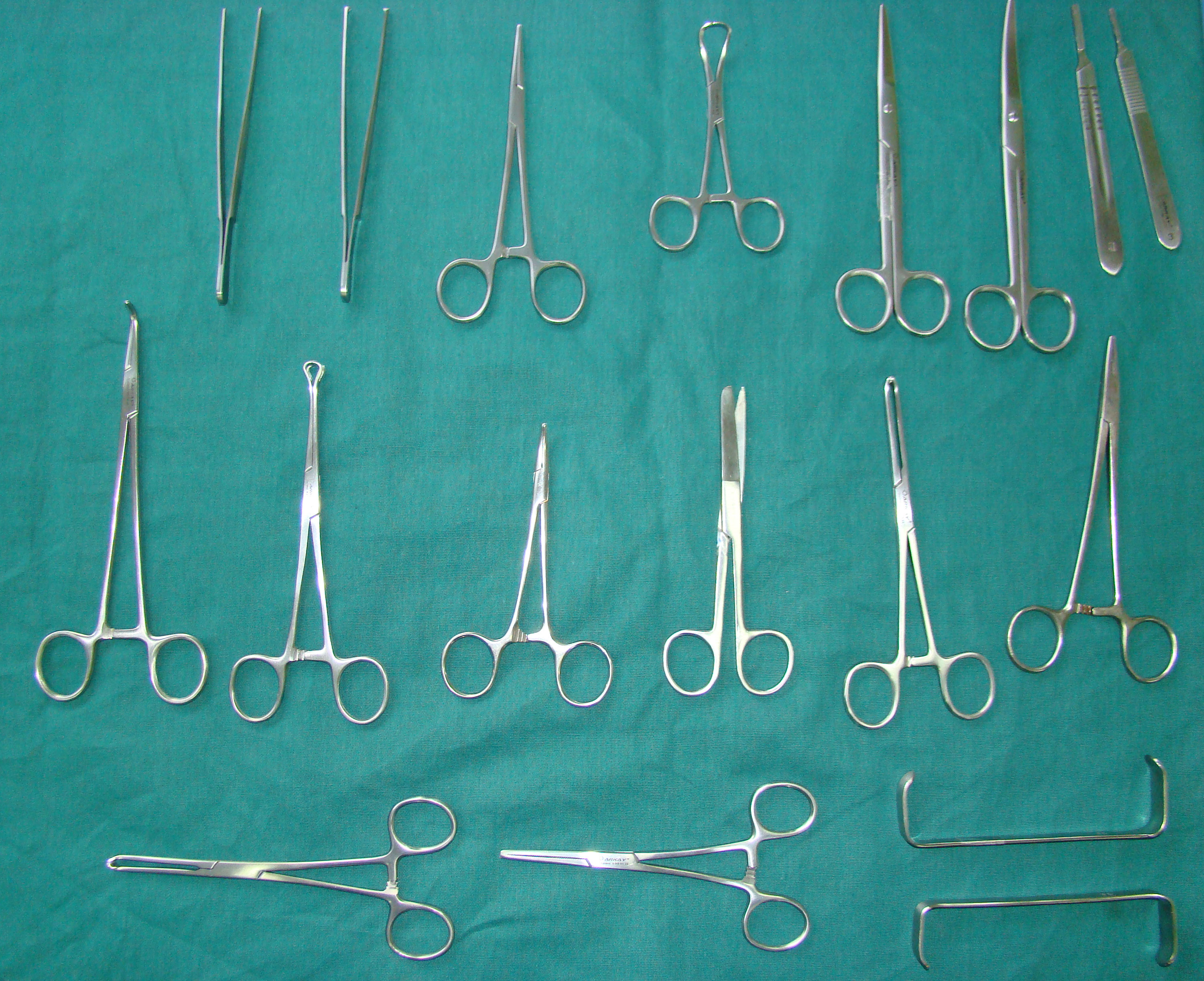
A surgical instrument set. Traceability systems can identify complete sets or individual instruments as they move through reprocessing and clinical use.

While traditional set-level systems track complete surgical trays via barcodes, individual-instrument tracking uses permanent laser-engraved two-dimensional data-matrix codes, Unique Device Identification (UDI) markings, or radio-frequency identification (RFID) tags. Electronic traceability facilitates rapid isolation of affected instruments during a product recall or sterilization cycle failure, complementing physical validation and process monitoring.

=== Environmental sustainability ===
Sterile processing accounts for a substantial share of hospital water, energy, and consumable resource use. Comparative cradle-to-grave life-cycle assessments (LCAs) consistently indicate that reusable surgical instruments reprocessed in centralized sterile services departments generate lower greenhouse-gas emissions and solid waste than single-use disposable alternatives across most clinical categories, provided reprocessing equipment is operated at high load efficiency. Sustainability initiatives within sterile processing units include transitioning from disposable polypropylene sterilization wrap to reusable rigid sterilization containers, optimizing washer-disinfector and autoclave load consolidation, and recovering reverse-osmosis reject water.

== Quality, safety, and regulation ==
=== Clinical impact and device-associated outbreaks ===
Inadequately cleaned, disinfected, or sterilized reusable medical devices can transmit pathogens and cause healthcare-associated infections and surgical site infections. Because retained organic soil and biofilm can shield microorganisms and prevent sterilants or high-level disinfectants from contacting device surfaces, sterilization cannot compensate for incomplete cleaning.

Historically, complex lumened instruments—most notably duodenoscopes used in endoscopic retrograde cholangiopancreatography (ERCP)—have been implicated in outbreaks of multidrug-resistant organisms, including carbapenem-resistant Enterobacteriaceae (CRE), even when staff adhered to manufacturers' reprocessing instructions. Molecular outbreak investigations demonstrated that intricate elevator mechanisms and micro-channels can harbor persistent biofilms, prompting international regulatory bodies to strengthen pre-cleaning protocols, introduce borescope inspection and microbiological surveillance, and promote redesigned or disposable-tip endoscopes.

=== Validation and quality assurance ===
Because sterility cannot be verified by inspecting a finished packaged device without destroying its sterile barrier, sterile processing relies on validated, continuously monitored processes. Equipment undergoes installation, operational, and performance qualification (IQ/OQ/PQ), routine calibration, preventive maintenance, and annual requalification. Process efficacy depends on multiple interdependent variables, including water purity, detergent chemistry, mechanical action, cycle time, temperature, steam dryness, air removal, load configuration, and packaging integrity.

ISO 13485, Medical devices — Quality management systems — Requirements for regulatory purposes, establishes quality-management-system requirements for organizations involved in medical-device manufacturing and reprocessing services. Rather than prescribing specific cycle parameters, ISO 13485 mandates documented governance over contamination control, process validation, traceability, nonconformity management, and corrective and preventive action (CAPA).

=== Occupational safety ===
Sterile-processing personnel face biological, chemical, thermal, and ergonomic hazards. Soiled instruments carry risks of bloodborne pathogen exposure and percutaneous sharps injuries during point-of-use sorting and manual cleaning, while process chemicals (such as enzymatic detergents, peracetic acid, and ethylene oxide), high-pressure steam autoclaves, and heavy surgical instrument trays present respiratory, burn, and musculoskeletal risks.

Surgical instruments in use during an appendectomy in Assam, India. Reusable instruments can be contaminated with blood and tissue during clinical use and require safe handling and decontamination before reuse.

Mitigation relies on fluid-resistant personal protective equipment (PPE), puncture-resistant transport containers, engineering controls (such as local exhaust ventilation and height-adjustable workstations), immunization, and strict separation of contaminated and clean workflows.

=== Standards and regulation ===
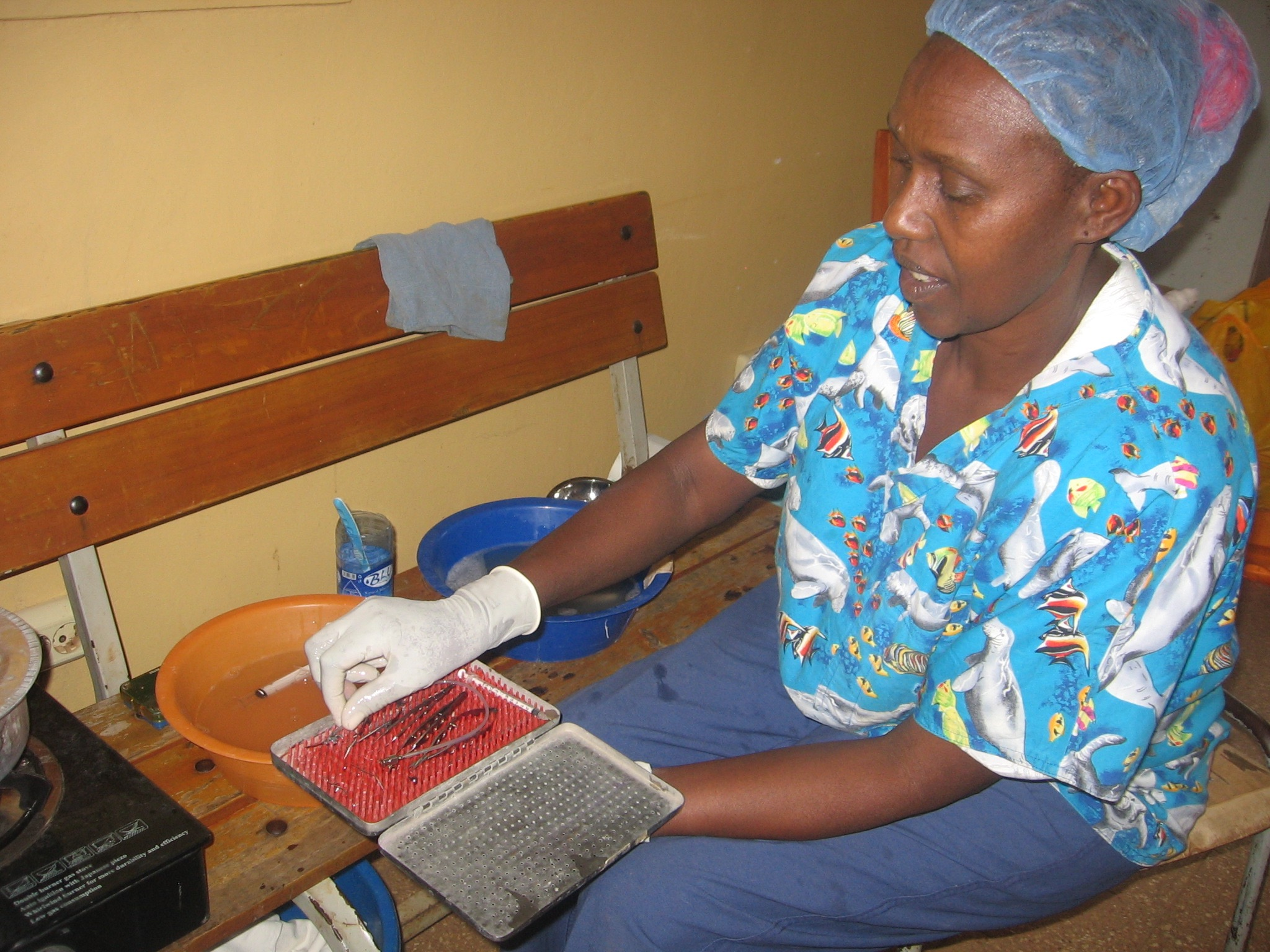
Sterilization of medical equipment in Bedele, Ethiopia. Reprocessing infrastructure and available technologies vary between healthcare systems; WHO guidance provides common principles for safe decontamination and reprocessing.

Internationally, technical harmonization is anchored by the International Organization for Standardization (ISO), notably ISO 15883 (washer-disinfectors), ISO 17665 (moist-heat sterilization), ISO 11607 (terminally sterilized packaging), and ISO 14937 (general characterization and validation of sterilizing agents). National and regional authorities implement these benchmarks through distinct regulatory frameworks:

Major international and regional sterile-processing frameworks
Jurisdiction / Body	Key standards and guidance	Regulatory and oversight focus
International (WHO / ISO)	WHO Decontamination and Reprocessing Manual (2016); ISO 15883, 17665, 11607, 13485	Global technical harmonization and resource-tiered infection-control guidance across high- and low-resource healthcare settings
United States	CDC Disinfection and Sterilization Guideline; ANSI/AAMI ST79, ST91	Dual oversight: Food and Drug Administration (FDA) regulates medical devices and validated IFUs, while CMS and accrediting bodies enforce facility compliance
United Kingdom	Health Technical Memoranda (HTM 01-01, HTM 01-06 in England; SHTM 01-01 in Scotland)	Mandatory quality systems, strict residual protein limits following vCJD precautions, and independent Authorising Engineer (Decontamination) audits
European Union	EU Medical Device Regulation (MDR 2017/745); EN 285, EN 868	Harmonized European norms for sterilizers and packaging, plus strict legal conditions governing the reprocessing of single-use devices
Australia and New Zealand	AS 5369:2023 (superseding AS/NZS 4187:2014)	Mandatory compliance for physical zone separation, water-quality specifications, validation, and electronic traceability

In low- and middle-income healthcare settings where automated washer-disinfectors, reverse-osmosis water plants, and centralized departments may be unavailable, WHO guidelines establish minimum safe standards for validated manual cleaning, benchtop steam sterilization, and basic biological or chemical monitoring.

== Personnel ==
=== Roles, training, and competence ===
Sterile-processing personnel perform decontamination, inspection, set assembly, packaging, sterilization, cycle verification, storage, and clinical distribution. Core training covers infection prevention and control, microbiology, surgical-instrument nomenclature, cleaning chemistries, sterilization physics, occupational safety and health, and quality documentation.

Formal competency assessment is used to verify that technicians can execute reprocessing steps consistently and safely. Senior, specialist, and managerial roles encompass operations management, equipment validation and qualification, risk management, nonconformance investigation, quality management, and technical review of manufacturers' instructions for use.

=== Professionalization ===
Although sterile processing evolved into a specialized technical discipline alongside centralized departments, formal qualification mandates and occupational recognition differ considerably across countries. Research in the United Kingdom has highlighted practitioner demand for standardized external education, clearer career pathways, and greater clinical visibility within healthcare systems, alongside debate over whether mandatory external qualifications should be required across the workforce.

Certification and professional bodies include the Healthcare Sterile Processing Association (HSPA) and the Certification Board for Sterile Processing and Distribution (CBSPD) in the United States, the Institute of Decontamination Sciences (IDSc) and Academy for Healthcare Science in the United Kingdom, the European Forum for Hospital Sterile Supply (EFHSS), and the World Federation for Hospital Sterilisation Sciences (WFHSS).
