= Synergy Health =

UK based healthcare company

Synergy Health plc
- Type: Public
- Traded as: LSE: SYR
- Industry: Health care
- Founded: 1991
- Defunct: October 2014
- Fate: Acquired by Steris Corporation as a tax inversion
- Headquarters: Swindon, Wiltshire
- Key people: Sir Duncan K. Nichol, Chairman; Richard Steeves, CEO
- Products: Distribution of medical hygiene products
- Services: Sterilisation and decontamination of medical instruments, laboratory services including pathology and drug testing, contract laundry for healthcare providers
- Revenue: £380.5 million (2014)
- Operating income: £61.3 million (2014)
- Net income: £34.3 million (2014)
- Number of employees: 4,500 (2012)
- Website: www.synergyhealthplc.com

Synergy Health plc (LSE: SYR) was a global company headquartered in the United Kingdom. The company provides specialist outsourced services to the healthcare and related markets around the world, including sterilization services for medical device and other manufacturers, decontamination of surgical instruments for hospitals and other medical practitioners together with related hygiene services. The company was listed on the London Stock Exchange until it was acquired by Steris Corporation in October 2014.

== History ==
Synergy was founded in 1991 as a manufacturer of surgical packs in Corby, Northamptonshire, listing on the Alternative Investment Market in London that same year. In subsequent years the company grew organically and through acquisition, buying a number of healthcare-related companies in the UK including Shiloh, and Vernon Carus. It also bought companies in Europe and Asia including Isotron Plc, and companies in the US including MSI and SRI.

In October 2014, medical technology provider Steris Corporation agreed to buy Synergy for £1.2 billion ($1.9 billion) as a tax inversion. The new Steris Corporation will be based in the UK for tax purposes (35 percent in US and only 25 percent in UK), while the US business will still operate.

== Operations ==
The company's services include the medical device sterilisation, sterilisation of reusable medical instruments, provision of outsourced laundry services and the reprocessing of surgical linen. Synergy also provides a range of laboratory services including occupational pathology services and workplace drug and alcohol testing. The company also distributes medical hygiene products such as proprietary antibacterial cleansers and wet wipes, swabs and bandages.
