= Steris =

Irish registered American medical device company

STERIS plc
- Type: Public
- Traded as: NYSE: STE; S&P 500 component
- ISIN: IE00BFY8C754
- Industry: Medical devices
- Founded: 1985; 41 years ago
- Headquarters: Mentor, Ohio, U.S.
- Key people: Daniel A. Carestio (President and CEO)
- Revenue: ▲US$5.14 billion (2024)
- Operating income: ▲US$836 million (2024)
- Net income: ▲US$378 million (2024)
- Total assets: ▲US$11.1 billion (2024)
- Total equity: ▲US$6.32 billion (2024)
- Number of employees: 18,179 (2024)
- Website: steris.com
- Footnotes; Financials as of 31 March 2024.

Steris plc is an American-Irish-based medical equipment company specializing in sterilization, sterile processing, and surgical products for the US healthcare system. Steris is operationally headquartered in Mentor, Ohio, and has been legally registered in Dublin, Ireland, for tax purposes since 2018. Previously the company was registered in the United Kingdom from 2014 to 2018.

Steris is listed on the New York Stock Exchange, and is a constituent of the S&P 500 Index. As of 2024, the president and CEO is Daniel A. Carestio.

== History ==
Steris was founded in August 1985 in Ohio, under the name "Innovative Medical Technologies".

In 2012, Steris acquired US Endoscopy for $270 million. Steris also acquired Spectrum Surgical Instruments Corp. and Total Repair Express for $110 million combined.

On April 1, 2014, Steris announced its acquisition of Integrated Medical Systems International Inc. for ~$175 million, although it would only cost the company ~$140 million after tax benefits. Shortly after, Steris also acquired Chesterfield, Missouri-based Life Systems.

In October 2014, Steris executed a tax inversion from the United States to the United Kingdom, via an offer made to acquire UK-based Synergy Health for $1.9 billion. The tax inversion was notable as it was the first US inversion post the new rules introduced by the Obama administration in 2014 to curb US corporations moving their "legal domicile" to reduce their exposure to US corporate taxation.

On June 24, 2015, Steris announced the acquisitions of General Econopak for $175 million and Black Diamond Video for $51 million.

Steris filed accounts which showed global revenues of over US$2.6 billion in 2018, of which US$1.8 billion (or 70 percent) came from the US healthcare system; and employed ~12,000 people.

In November 2018, Steris announced that it would further re-domicile its legal headquarters from the United Kingdom to Ireland; Steris had reduced its corporate tax rate from 31.3 percent to 20 percent as a result of its 2014 tax inversion to the United Kingdom, however, it believed a further reduction could be achieved by moving to Ireland.

In April 2020, Steris received emergency use authorization from the FDA for a N95 mask sterilization system to help address the shortage of personal protective equipment during the 2019-20 coronavirus pandemic.

In November 2020, Steris acquired Key Surgical, a leading global provider of sterile processing, operating room, and endoscopy products.

In June 2021, Steris acquired Cantel Medical Corporation a provider of infection prevention products and services to endoscopy, dental and dialysis.

== See also ==
- Corporate tax inversions to Ireland
- Ireland as a tax haven
- Medtronic, another example of US medical device tax inversion to Ireland
