= Gene Robinson (disambiguation) =

Gene Robinson (born 1947) is an American Episcopal bishop

Gene Robinson may also refer to:

- Gene E. Robinson (born 1955), American entomologist
- Gene Robinson, founder and CEO of Integrated Medical Systems International
- Gene Robinson, a member of Breakwater, an American funk band

== See also ==
- Eugene Robinson (disambiguation)
- Jean Robinson (1899–1986), English politician
- Jean Louis Robinson, Malagasy politician
