= Decontamination =

Process of removing or neutralizing harmful substances

Decontamination (sometimes abbreviated as decon, dcon, or decontam) is the process of removing or neutralizing contaminants from an object, person, or area, including chemicals, microorganisms, and radioactive substances. Methods include physical removal, cleaning, disinfection, chemical treatment, and, where required, sterilization. Decontamination specifically reduces or removes a contamination hazard and is therefore broader than cleaning alone.

Decontamination is used in healthcare, dentistry, veterinary medicine, food production, environmental science, forensic science, and emergency response.

In healthcare, decontamination of reusable medical devices forms part of sterile processing, a wider reprocessing cycle that can include cleaning, disinfection, and sterilization. The Spaulding classification categorizes medical devices according to their clinical use and associated infection risk and is used to determine the required level of decontamination.

== Methods ==
Methods of decontamination include:

- Antisepsis
- Disinfection
- Physical cleaning
- Sterilization (microbiology)
- Ultrasonic cleaning
- Water purification

A variety of decontaminations methods may be used, including physical processes such as distillation, and chemical cleansers such as alcohols and detergents.

== See also ==
- Decontamination foam
- Dry decontamination
- Environmental remediation
- Groundwater decontamination
- Human decontamination
- Soil decontamination
