= Infection prevention and control =

Medical discipline for preventing nosocomial or healthcare-associated infection

Infection prevention and control (IPC) is the discipline concerned with preventing healthcare-associated infections; a practical rather than academic sub-discipline of epidemiology. In Northern Europe, infection prevention and control is expanded from healthcare into a component in public health, known as "infection protection" (smittevern, smittskydd, Infektionsschutz in the local languages). It is an essential part of the infrastructure of health care. Infection control and hospital epidemiology are akin to public health practice, practiced within the confines of a particular health-care delivery system rather than directed at society as a whole.

Infection control addresses factors related to the spread of infections within the healthcare setting, whether among patients, from patients to staff, from staff to patients, or among staff. This includes preventive measures such as hand washing, cleaning, disinfecting, sterilizing, and vaccinating. Other aspects include surveillance, monitoring, and investigating and managing suspected outbreaks of infection within a healthcare setting.

A subsidiary aspect of infection control involves preventing the spread of antimicrobial-resistant organisms such as MRSA. This in turn connects to the discipline of antimicrobial stewardship—limiting the use of antimicrobials to necessary cases, as increased usage inevitably results in the selection and dissemination of resistant organisms. Antimicrobial medications (aka antimicrobials or anti-infective agents) include antibiotics, antibacterials, antifungals, antivirals and antiprotozoals.

The World Health Organization (WHO) has set up an Infection Prevention and Control (IPC) unit in its Service Delivery and Safety department that publishes related guidelines.

== Infection prevention and control ==
Aseptic technique is a key component of all invasive medical procedures. Similar control measures are also recommended in any healthcare setting to prevent the spread of infection generally.

=== Hand hygiene ===
Hand hygiene is one of the basic, yet most important steps in IPC (Infection Prevention and Control). Hand hygiene reduces the chances of HAI (Healthcare Associated Infections) drastically at a floor-low cost. Hand hygiene consists of either hand wash (water based) or hand rubs (alcohol based). Hand wash is a solid 7-steps according to the WHO standards, wherein hand rubs are 5-steps.

The American Nurses Association (ANA) and American Association of Nurse Anesthesiology (AANA) have set specific checkpoints for nurses to clean their hands; the checkpoints for nurses include, before patient contact, before putting on protective equipment, before doing procedures, after contact with patient's skin and surroundings, after contamination of foreign substances, after contact with bodily fluids and wounds, after taking off protective equipment, and after using the restroom. To ensure all before and after checkpoints for hand washing are done, precautions such as hand sanitizer dispensers filled with sodium hypochlorite, alcohol, or hydrogen peroxide, which are three approved disinfectants that kill bacteria, are placed in certain points, and nurses carrying mini hand sanitizer dispensers help increase sanitation in the work field. In cases where equipment is being placed in a container or bin and picked back up, nurses and doctors are required to wash their hands or use alcohol sanitizer before going back to the container to use the same equipment.

Independent studies by Ignaz Semmelweis in 1846 in Vienna and Oliver Wendell Holmes Sr. in 1843 in Boston established a link between the hands of health care workers and the spread of hospital-acquired disease. The U.S. Centers for Disease Control and Prevention (CDC) state that "It is well documented that the most important measure for preventing the spread of pathogens is effective handwashing". In the developed world, hand washing is mandatory in most health care settings and required by many different regulators.

In the United States, OSHA standards require that employers must provide readily accessible hand washing facilities, and must ensure that employees wash hands and any other skin with soap and water or flush mucous membranes with water as soon as feasible after contact with blood or other potentially infectious materials (OPIM).

In the UK healthcare professionals have adopted the 'Ayliffe Technique', based on the 6 step method developed by Graham Ayliffe, J. R. Babb, and A. H. Quoraishi.

Mean percentage changes in bacterial numbers
Method used	Change in bacteria present
Paper towels (2-ply 100% recycled).	48.4%
Paper towels (2-ply through-air dried, 50% recycled)	76.8%
Warm air dryer	+ 254.5%
Jet air dryer	+ 14.9%

Drying is an essential part of the hand hygiene process. In November 2008, a non-peer-reviewed study was presented to the European Tissue Symposium by the University of Westminster, London, comparing the bacteria levels present after the use of paper towels, warm air hand dryers, and modern jet-air hand dryers. Of those three methods, only paper towels reduced the total number of bacteria on hands, with "through-air dried" towels the most effective.

The presenters also carried out tests to establish whether there was the potential for cross-contamination of other washroom users and the washroom environment as a result of each type of drying method. They found that:

- the jet air dryer, which blows air out of the unit at claimed speeds of 400 mph, was capable of blowing micro-organisms from the hands and the unit and potentially contaminating other washroom users and the washroom environment up to 2 metres away
- use of a warm air hand dryer spread micro-organisms up to 0.25 metres from the dryer
- paper towels showed no significant spread of micro-organisms.

In 2005, in a study conducted by TÜV Produkt und Umwelt, different hand drying methods were evaluated. The following changes in the bacterial count after drying the hands were observed:

Drying method	Effect on bacterial count
Paper towels and roll	Decrease of 24%
Hot-air drier	Increase of 117%

=== Cleaning, disinfection and sterilization ===
Cleaning, disinfection and sterilization are related but distinct measures used to reduce the risk of transmission of microorganisms from environmental surfaces and reusable medical equipment. Cleaning removes contamination and organic material and is generally required before effective disinfection or sterilization of reusable medical devices.

For reusable medical devices, the Spaulding classification categorizes items according to the infection risk associated with their clinical use. Critical devices enter sterile tissue or the vascular system and require sterilization; semicritical devices contact mucous membranes or non-intact skin and generally require at least high-level disinfection; and noncritical devices contact intact skin and generally require cleaning and low- or intermediate-level disinfection according to their use.

In healthcare facilities, these activities can form part of sterile processing, the wider reprocessing cycle for reusable medical devices. Sterile processing can include collection and transport, cleaning, disinfection, inspection, assembly, packaging, sterilization, storage, distribution and traceability.

==== Cleaning ====
Cleaning is the removal of visible soil, organic material and other contamination from objects and surfaces. It can involve water, detergents or enzymatic products together with mechanical action such as washing, brushing, flushing or ultrasonic cleaning. Effective cleaning is important before disinfection or sterilization because retained blood, tissue and other material can interfere with subsequent microbial inactivation.

For reusable medical devices, the cleaning method depends on the construction of the device and its manufacturer's reprocessing instructions. Devices with joints, hinges, lumens or other difficult-to-access surfaces can require disassembly, brushing, flushing, ultrasonic cleaning or automated processing to allow cleaning agents to reach contaminated surfaces.

For environmental infection prevention, routine cleaning of frequently touched surfaces and appropriate hand hygiene are used alongside other infection-control measures to reduce opportunities for transmission.

==== Disinfection ====
Disinfection eliminates many or all pathogenic microorganisms on inanimate objects but does not necessarily destroy bacterial spores. Disinfection can be achieved using chemical agents or physical processes, including thermal disinfection, and the required level depends on the intended use of the item.

Under the Spaulding classification, semicritical devices require at least high-level disinfection because they contact mucous membranes or non-intact skin. Noncritical devices contact intact skin and generally require cleaning together with an appropriate lower level of disinfection.

Environmental disinfection is also used to reduce microbial contamination of healthcare surfaces. Technologies such as ultraviolet irradiation can supplement routine environmental cleaning in some healthcare settings, although their use does not replace conventional cleaning and disinfection practices.

==== Sterilization ====
Sterilization is a validated process used to render a product free from viable microorganisms. It is required for critical reusable medical devices that enter sterile tissue or the vascular system.

Steam sterilization is widely used for heat- and moisture-compatible reusable medical devices. Effective steam sterilization requires saturated steam to contact the surfaces of the load under specified conditions of time and temperature; adequate removal of air is therefore important for steam penetration.

Heat- or moisture-sensitive devices can require other validated sterilization processes, including ethylene oxide and hydrogen peroxide-based low-temperature systems. Selection of a sterilization process depends on device compatibility, intended use and the manufacturer's validated reprocessing instructions.

Sterilization processes are monitored using combinations of physical measurements, chemical indicators and biological indicators. Physical monitoring records process variables such as time, temperature and pressure; chemical indicators respond to specified processing conditions; and biological indicators use resistant microorganisms or spores to assess microbial inactivation.

Sterilization does not compensate for inadequate cleaning. Safe reuse of a medical device depends on control of the complete reprocessing pathway, including cleaning, inspection, packaging, sterilization where required, storage and handling.

=== Personal protective equipment ===
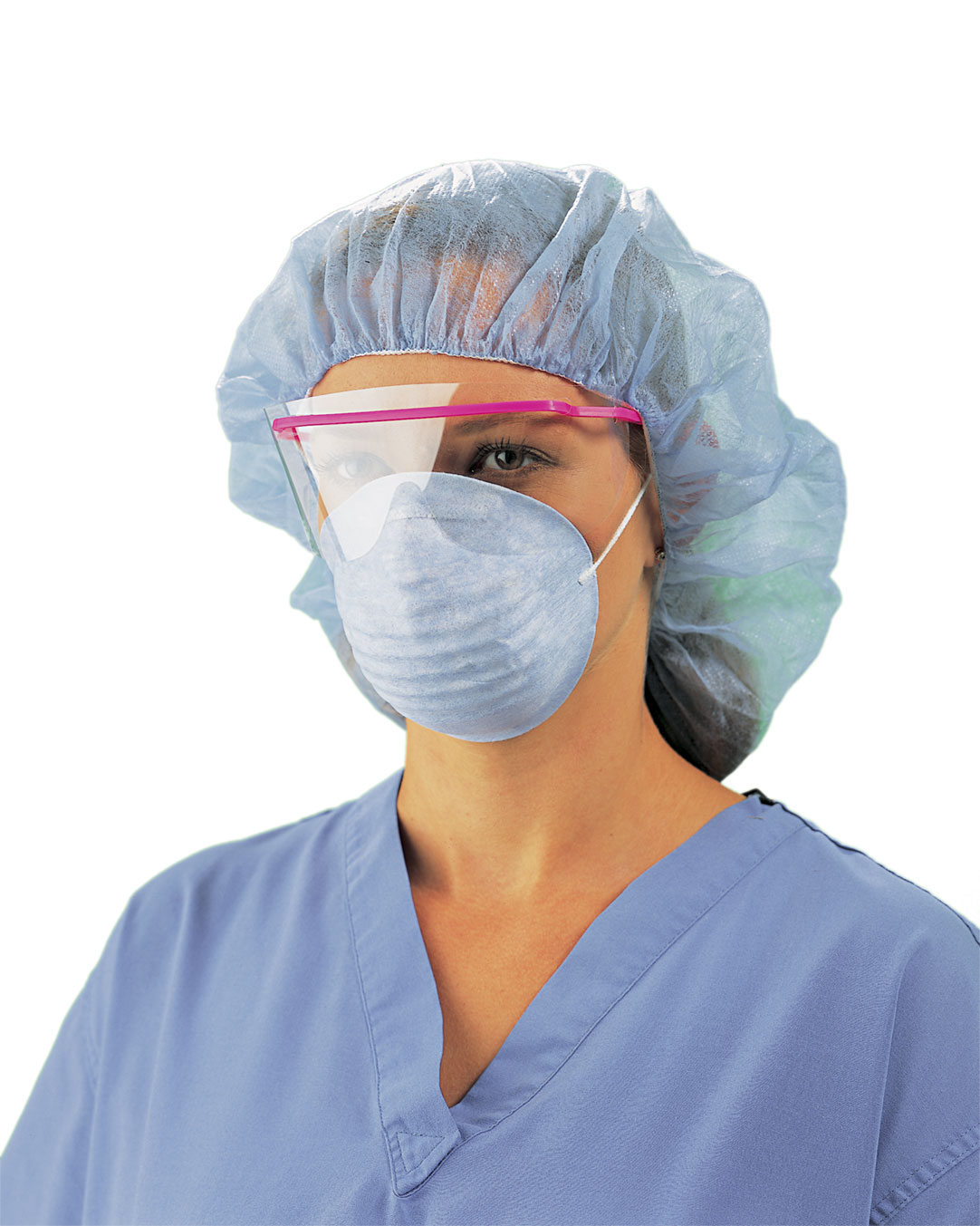
Disposable PPE

Personal protective equipment (PPE) is specialized clothing or equipment worn by a worker for protection against a hazard. The hazard in a health care setting is exposure to blood, saliva, or other bodily fluids or aerosols that may carry infectious materials such as Hepatitis C, HIV, or other blood borne or bodily fluid pathogen. PPE prevents contact with a potentially infectious material by creating a physical barrier between the potential infectious material and the healthcare worker.

The United States Occupational Safety and Health Administration (OSHA) requires the use of personal protective equipment (PPE) by workers to guard against blood borne pathogens if there is a reasonably anticipated exposure to blood or other potentially infectious materials.

Components of PPE include gloves, gowns, bonnets, shoe covers, face shields, CPR masks, goggles, surgical masks, and respirators. How many components are used and how the components are used is often determined by regulations or the infection control protocol of the facility in question, which in turn are derived from knowledge of the mechanism of transmission of the pathogen(s) of concern. Many or most of these items are disposable to avoid carrying infectious materials from one patient to another patient and to avoid difficult or costly disinfection. In the US, OSHA requires the immediate removal and disinfection or disposal of a worker's PPE prior to leaving the work area where exposure to infectious material took place. For health care professionals who may come into contact with highly infectious bodily fluids, using personal protective coverings on exposed body parts improves protection. Breathable personal protective equipment improves user-satisfaction and may offer a similar level of protection. In addition, adding tabs and other modifications to the protective equipment may reduce the risk of contamination during donning and doffing (putting on and taking off the equipment). Implementing an evidence-based donning and doffing protocol such as a one-step glove and gown removal technique, giving oral instructions while donning and doffing, double gloving, and the use of glove disinfection may also improve protection for health care professionals.

Guidelines set by the ANA and ANAA for proper use of disposable gloves include, removing and replacing gloves frequently and when they are contaminated, damaged, or in between treatment of multiple patients. When removing gloves, "grasp outer edge of glove near wrist, peel away from hand turning inside out, hold removed glove in opposite gloved hand, slide ungloved finger under wrist of gloved hand so finger is inside gloved area, peel off the glove from inside creating a 'bag' for both gloves, dispose of gloves in proper waste receptacle".

The inappropriate use of PPE equipment such as gloves, has been linked to an increase in rates of the transmission of infection, and the use of such must be compatible with the other particular hand hygiene agents used. Research studies in the form of randomized controlled trials and simulation studies are needed to determine the most effective types of PPE for preventing the transmission of infectious diseases to healthcare workers. There is low quality evidence that supports making improvements or modifications to personal protective equipment in order to help decrease contamination. Examples of modifications include adding tabs to masks or gloves to ease removal and designing protective gowns so that gloves are removed at the same time. In addition, there is weak evidence that the following PPE approaches or techniques may lead to reduced contamination and improved compliance with PPE protocols: Wearing double gloves, following specific doffing (removal) procedures such as those from the CDC, and providing people with spoken instructions while removing PPE.

=== Device-related infections ===
Healthcare-related infections such as (catheter-associated) urinary tract infections and (central-line) associated bloodstream infections can be caused by medical devices such as urinary catheters and central lines. Prudent use is essential in preventing infections associated with these medical devices. mHealth and patient participation have been used to improve risk awareness and prudent use (e.g. Participatient).

=== Antimicrobial surfaces ===
Microorganisms are known to survive on non-antimicrobial inanimate 'touch' surfaces (e.g., bedrails, over-the-bed trays, call buttons, bathroom hardware, etc.) for extended periods of time. This can be especially troublesome in hospital environments where patients with immunodeficiencies are at enhanced risk for contracting nosocomial infections.

Products made with antimicrobial copper alloy (brasses, bronzes, cupronickel, copper-nickel-zinc, and others) surfaces destroy a wide range of microorganisms in a short period. The United States Environmental Protection Agency has approved the registration of 355 different antimicrobial copper alloys and one synthetic copper-infused hard surface that kills E. coli O157:H7, methicillin-resistant Staphylococcus aureus (MRSA), Staphylococcus, Enterobacter aerogenes, and Pseudomonas aeruginosa in less than 2 hours of contact. Other investigations have demonstrated the efficacy of antimicrobial copper alloys to destroy Clostridioides difficile, influenza A virus, adenovirus, and fungi. As a public hygienic measure in addition to regular cleaning, antimicrobial copper alloys are being installed in healthcare facilities in the UK, Ireland, Japan, Korea, France, Denmark, and Brazil. The synthetic hard surface is being installed in the United States as well as in Israel.

== Vaccination of health care workers ==
Healthcare workers may be exposed to certain infections in the course of their work. Vaccines are available to provide some protection to workers in a healthcare setting. Depending on regulation, recommendation, specific work function, or personal preference, healthcare workers or first responders may receive vaccinations for hepatitis B; influenza; COVID-19, measles, mumps and rubella; Tetanus, diphtheria, pertussis; N. meningitidis; and varicella.

== Surveillance for infections ==
Surveillance is the act of infection investigation using the CDC definitions. Determining the presence of a hospital acquired infection requires an infection control practitioner (ICP) to review a patient's chart and see if the patient had the signs and symptom of an infection. Surveillance definitions exist for infections of the bloodstream, urinary tract, pneumonia, surgical sites and gastroenteritis.

Surveillance traditionally involved significant manual data assessment and entry in order to assess preventative actions such as isolation of patients with an infectious disease. Increasingly, computerized software solutions are becoming available that assess incoming risk messages from microbiology and other online sources. By reducing the need for data entry, software can reduce the data workload of ICPs, freeing them to concentrate on clinical surveillance.

As of 1998, approximately one third of healthcare acquired infections were preventable. Surveillance and preventative activities are increasingly a priority for hospital staff. The Study on the Efficacy of Nosocomial Infection Control (SENIC) project by the U.S. CDC found in the 1970s that hospitals reduced their nosocomial infection rates by approximately 32 per cent by focusing on surveillance activities and prevention efforts.

== Isolation and quarantine ==
In healthcare facilities, medical isolation refers to various physical measures taken to interrupt nosocomial spread of contagious diseases. Various forms of isolation exist, and are applied depending on the type of infection and agent involved, and its route of transmission, to address the likelihood of spread via airborne particles or droplets, by direct skin contact, or via contact with body fluids.

In cases where infection is merely suspected, individuals may be quarantined until the incubation period has passed and the disease manifests itself or the person remains healthy. Groups may undergo quarantine, or in the case of communities, a cordon sanitaire may be imposed to prevent infection from spreading beyond the community, or in the case of protective sequestration, into a community. Public health authorities may implement other forms of social distancing, such as school closings, when needing to control an epidemic.

== Barriers and facilitators of implementing infection prevention and control guidelines ==
Barriers to the ability of healthcare workers to follow PPE and infection control guidelines include communication of the guidelines, workplace support (manager support), the culture of use at the workplace, adequate training, the amount of physical space in the facility, access to PPE, and healthcare worker motivation to provide good patient care. Facilitators include the importance of including all the staff in a facility (healthcare workers and support staff) should be done when guidelines are implemented.

== Outbreak investigation ==
When an unusual cluster of illness is noted, infection control teams undertake an investigation to determine whether there is a true disease outbreak, a pseudo-outbreak (a result of contamination within the diagnostic testing process), or just random fluctuation in the frequency of illness. If a true outbreak is discovered, infection control practitioners try to determine what permitted the outbreak to occur, and to rearrange the conditions to prevent ongoing propagation of the infection. Often, breaches in good practice are responsible, although sometimes other factors (such as construction) may be the source of the problem.

Outbreaks investigations have more than a single purpose. These investigations are carried out in order to prevent additional cases in the current outbreak, prevent future outbreaks, learn about a new disease or learn something new about an old disease. Reassuring the public, minimizing the economic and social disruption as well as teaching epidemiology are some other obvious objectives of outbreak investigations.

According to the WHO, outbreak investigations are meant to detect what is causing the outbreak, how the pathogenic agent is transmitted, where it all started from, what is the carrier, what is the population at risk of getting infected and what are the risk factors.

== Training in infection control and health care epidemiology ==
Practitioners can come from several different educational streams: many begin as registered nurses, some as public health inspectors (environmental health officers), some as medical technologists (particularly in clinical microbiology), and some as physicians (typically infectious disease specialists). Specialized training in infection control and health care epidemiology are offered by the professional organizations described below. Physicians who desire to become infection control practitioners often are trained in the context of an infectious disease fellowship. Training that is conducted "face to face", via a computer, or via video conferencing may help improve compliance and reduce errors when compared with "folder based" training (providing health care professionals with written information or instructions).

In the United States, Certification Board of Infection Control and Epidemiology is a private company that certifies infection control practitioners based on their educational background and professional experience, in conjunction with testing their knowledge base with standardized exams. The credential awarded is CIC, Certification in Infection Control and Epidemiology. It is recommended that one has 2 years of Infection Control experience before applying for the exam. Certification must be renewed every five years.

A course in hospital epidemiology (infection control in the hospital setting) is offered jointly each year by the Centers for Disease Control and Prevention (CDC) and the Society for Healthcare Epidemiology of America.

== Standardization ==
=== Australia ===
In 2002, the Royal Australian College of General Practitioners published a revised standard for office-based infection control which covers the sections of managing immunisation, sterilisation and disease surveillance. However, the document on the personal hygiene of health workers is only limited to hand hygiene, waste and linen management, which may not be sufficient since some of the pathogens are air-borne and could be spread through air flow.

Since 1 November 2019, the Australian Commission on Safety and Quality in Health Care has managed the Hand Hygiene initiative in Australia, an initiative focused on improving hand hygiene practices to reduce the incidence of healthcare-associated infections.

=== United States ===
Currently, the federal regulation that describes infection control standards, as related to occupational exposure to potentially infectious blood and other materials, is found at 29 CFR Part 1910.1030 Bloodborne pathogens.

== See also ==
- Pandemic prevention – Organization and management of preventive measures against pandemics
