= HSPA =

HSPA may refer to:

- High Speed Packet Access, a mobile broadband technology
- Hawaiian Sugar Planters' Association

== Education ==
- High School Proficiency Assessment
- Humphrey School of Public Affairs, an American public policy school
- Hunter School of the Performing Arts, a school in Australia

== Healthcare ==
- Healthcare Sterile Processing Association
