= Surgical site infection =

Infection that occurs at the site of a surgical procedure

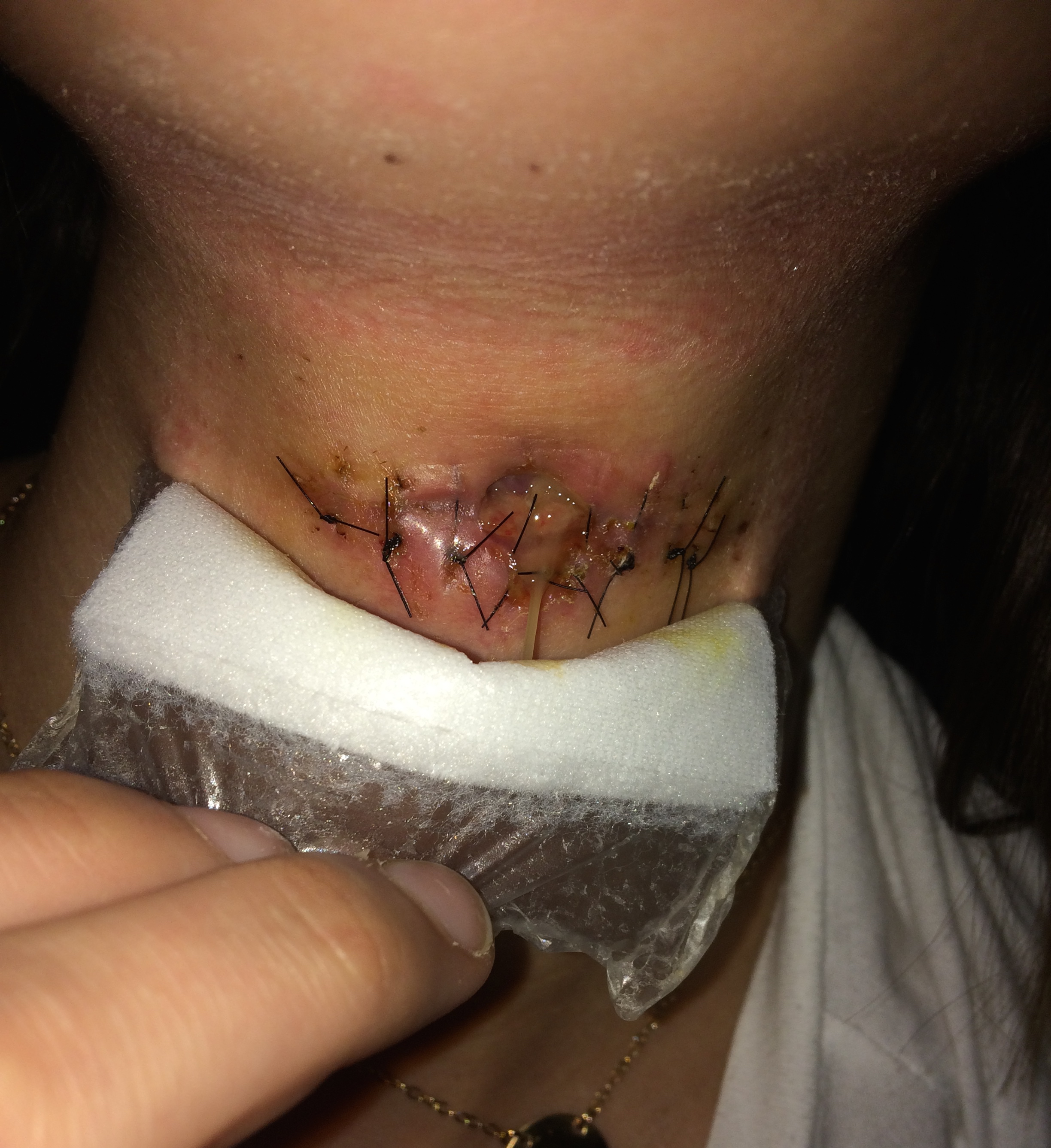
A surgical incision on the neck shows red irritation and green/yellow discharge between surgical stitches.

A surgical site infection (SSI) develop when bacteria infiltrate the body through surgical incisions. These bacteria may come from the patient's own skin, the surgical instruments, or the environment in which the procedure is performed.

An infection is designated as an SSI if it develops at the site of a surgical wound, either because of contamination during surgery or as a result of postoperative complications. For the infection to be classified as an SSI, it should occur within 30 days after surgery or within 90 days if an implant is involved.

Surgical site infections that are limited to the skin and subcutaneous tissues are classified as superficial incisional SSIs. These infections are the most common type, accounting for more than 50% of all reported surgical site infections.

Prevention of surgical site infection involves measures before, during and after surgery, including appropriate antimicrobial prophylaxis, skin preparation, aseptic technique, environmental controls, wound care, and the appropriate reprocessing of reusable medical devices via sterile processing before reuse.

== Symptoms ==
The symptoms of a surgical site infection (SSI) can vary depending on the severity and type of infection. Common signs include redness and pain around the area of the surgical wound. A cloudy or purulent fluid may drain from the wound, indicating infection. Fever is another common symptom, which may accompany other signs such as increased warmth, swelling, or delayed healing at the surgical site. Additional symptoms may also occur, depending on the nature and extent of the infection.

== Types ==
SSIs occur in different areas such as skin, tissue, organs, "implanted material, like a hip replacement".

The Centers for Disease Control and Prevention (CDC) classifies SSIs into three categories: superficial incisional, deep incisional, and organ/space infections.

- Superficial incisional infection: involve only the outer layer of skin where the incision was made.
- Deep incisional infection: affect deeper tissues beneath the incision, such as muscles and the surrounding connective tissues.
- Organ or space infection: occur in internal areas of the body, such as an organ or a cavity between organs, that were involved in the surgical procedure.

== Pathogen involving ==
The microorganisms responsible for surgical site infections (SSIs) are often derived from endogenous flora. The specific pathogens involved typically vary depending on the type of surgical procedure performed. Among the most frequently identified organisms are staphylococcus aureus, coagulase-negative staphylococci, enterococcus faecalis, and escherichia coli. These pathogens reflect the microbiological environment of the surgical field and the body sites exposed during the operation.

== Mortality ==
SSIs are a significant cause of complications following surgery, contributing to both perioperative morbidity and mortality. These infections are responsible for a large number of healthcare-associated infections globally, including over 2 million cases annually in the United States alone.

== Studies ==
There has been ongoing research on the SSIs, with the National Institute for Health and Care Research (NIHR) Global Research Health Unit on Global Surgery and GlobalSurg Collaborative. Several keypoints have been identified as Low income countries have a disproportionately greater burden of SSIs (with 4 times the burden in children) than other countries and higher rates of antibiotic resistance. More studies have investigated the role of perioperative high fraction Oxygen and Telemedicine in preventing and improving outcomes of SSIs.

A study conducted by researchers at the University of Washington School of Medicine, published in 2024 and featured by the University of Minnesota and the American Association for the Advancement of Science, and Nature involved 210 adult patients undergoing spinal fusion surgery and found that most infections following surgery were caused by bacteria already present on the patients' skin.

The researchers aimed to understand why surgical site infections (SSIs), which occur in about 1 in 30 surgeries, have not decreased despite infection prevention measures. They analyzed preoperative patient microbiomes and postoperative SSI samples using genomic analysis. Of the 210 patients, 14 (6.8%) developed SSIs. Skin, nasal, and rectal samples were taken before surgery from most patients. Whole genome sequencing of 22 SSI samples revealed that 86% were similar to bacterial strains found on the patients' skin before surgery. Further analysis of 59 additional SSIs in the same hospital showed no common bacterial strains, suggesting that the infections were not linked to external hospital sources.

A recent study of 150 adults undergoing ortho-spine procedures were randomized subjects pre-operatively to self-cleanse at home with 2% chlorhexidine gluconate and aloe-vera infused wipes or soap and water the night prior to surgery. Skin cultures were collected pre-cleansing, day of surgery at admission pre-operative, at hospital discharge and at the post-operative follow up visit with the surgeon (4–6 weeks post operative). The study revealed those cleansing with chlorhexidine gluconate (CHG) had statistically significantly less bacterial skin burden (including pathogens commonly associated with development of surgical site infections) than those who used soap and water. This protection lasted up to 4 days, perhaps due to the inclusion of aloe vera in the wipes moistening the skin allowing the CHG to cross several epidermal layers. This is important as the first 3–4 days after incision is the most vulnerable time as the skin epithelizes and heals forming a barrier to pathogens.

A 2025 study of adults undergoing surgery for extremity or pelvic fractures reported that iodine povacrylex in isopropyl alcohol, when used for preoperative skin antisepsis in closed fracture surgery, was associated with fewer surgical site infections within 90 days than chlorhexidine gluconate in isopropyl alcohol. Infection rates after open fractures and the likelihood of unplanned fracture-related reoperation within one year were similar between the two antiseptic solutions.

=== Global Surgical-Site Infection score ===
A 'Global Surgical-Site Infection' score was published by NIHR Global Research Health Unit on Global Surgery and GlobalSurg Collaborative that allows the SSIs risk prediction with perioperative variables.

== See also ==
- Wound dehiscence
- Prosthetic joint infection
