= RSDL =

RSDL may refer to:

- RESTful Service Description Language, an XML description of HTTP-based web applications
- Rotating Staircase Deadline, a Linux CPU scheduler
- Rail Simulator Developments Ltd, a developer of Rail Simulator
- Reactive skin decontamination lotion; See Dry decontamination
- Reverse spiral dual layer, a DVD format; For example See Intimate and Live
- Residential Surveillance at a Designated Location, a form of detention in the People's Republic of China
- Russian Social Democratic Labour Party
