= Eugene Robinson =

Eugene Robinson may refer to:

- Eugene Robinson (American football) (born 1963), American football player
- Eugene Robinson (journalist) (born 1954), American journalist
- Eugene Robinson, a singer in the band Oxbow

== See also ==
- Gene Robinson (disambiguation)
