= Sterility assurance level =

Probability concept in microbiology

In microbiology, sterility assurance level (SAL) is the probability that a single unit that has been subjected to sterilization nevertheless remains nonsterile.

It is never possible to prove that all organisms have been destroyed, as the likelihood of survival of an individual microorganism is never zero. So SAL is used to express the probability of the survival. For example, medical device manufacturers and hospital sterile processing departments design and validate their terminal sterilization processes to achieve an SAL of 10^{−6}, representing a 1 in 1,000,000 chance of a non-sterile unit.

== Terminology ==
Mathematically, SALs are probabilities, often very small but (by definition) always lying between zero and one. So when they are expressed in scientific notation their exponents are nonpositive, as for instance, "The SAL of this process is 10^{−6}". But the term SAL is sometimes also used to refer to a sterilization's efficacy. This usage (technically the multiplicative inverse) results in nonnegative exponents, as in "The SAL of this process is 10^{6}". To avoid ambiguity from these inverse usages, some authors use the term log reduction (e.g., "This process gives a six-log reduction").

SALs can also be used to describe the microbial population that was destroyed by the sterilization process, though this is not the same as the probabilistic definition. What is often called a "log reduction" (technically a reduction by one order of magnitude) represents a 90% reduction in microbial population. Thus a process that achieves a "6-log reduction" (10^{−6}) will theoretically reduce an initial population of one million organisms to very close to zero. The difference in meaning between this and the probabilistic sense can be seen from an example: if careful assays before and after indicate that a procedure has inactivated 90% of the biological agents in some unit, then the procedure can be correctly reported to have achieved a 1-log reduction, even though the probability that the unit is sterile is not 90% but 0.

Because of all these ambiguities, contexts in which it is critical to prevent any confusion—such as in the setting of standards—require that SAL terminology be defined carefully and explicitly.

SALs describing the "Probability of a Non-Sterile Unit" are expressed more specifically in some literature.
