= Sterilant gas monitoring =

Detection of hazardous gases

Sterilant gas monitoring is the detection of hazardous gases used by health care and other facilities to sterilize medical supplies that cannot be sterilized by heat or steam methods. The current FDA approved sterilant gases are ethylene oxide, hydrogen peroxide and ozone. Other liquid sterilants, such as peracetic acid, may also be used for sterilization and may raise similar occupational health issues. Sterilization means the complete destruction of all biological life (including viruses and sporoidal forms of bacteria), and sterilization efficacy is typically considered adequate if less than one in a million microbes remain viable.

== Hazards of sterilant gases ==
Since sterilant gases are selected to destroy a wide range of biological life forms, any gas which is suitable for sterilization will present a hazard to personnel exposed to it. NIOSH's IDLH (immediately dangerous to life and health) values for the three sterilant gases are 800 ppm (ethylene oxide), 75 ppm (hydrogen peroxide) and 5 ppm (ozone). For comparison, the IDLH of cyanide gas (hydrogen cyanide) is 50 ppm. The OSHA PEL (permissible exposure limit) will be considerably lower than this; 1 ppm for ethylene oxide, or 5 ppm for a 15 minute short-term exposure limit. Thus exposure to even low levels of sterilant gas should not be treated casually and most facilities go to great lengths to adequately protect their employees. In addition to toxicity, ethylene oxide is flammable (from above 3%) and ozone is damaging to equipment not designed to resist it.

Sterilizer manufacturers go to great lengths to make their products as safe as possible but, as with any mechanical device, they can and sometimes do fail and leaks have been reported. The odor threshold for these gases is above the PELs and for ethylene oxide it is 500 ppm, approaching that of the IDLH. Odor is thus inadequate as a monitoring technique. Continuous gas monitors are used as part of an overall safety program to provide a prompt alert to nearby workers in the event that there is a leak of the sterilant gas.

== Monitoring equipment ==
The monitor alarms are typically set to warn if the concentrations exceed the OSHA permissible exposure limits (PELs), 1.0 ppm for ethylene oxide and 1.0 and 0.1 ppm for hydrogen peroxide and ozone respectively. The PELs are calculated as 8 hour time weighted average values (i.e. the average exposure over a typical shift).
