= Integrated Medical Systems International =

Surgical instrument management and clinical consulting company

Integrated Medical Systems International, Inc.
- Company type: Private
- Industry: Medical instruments
- Founded: 1982; 44 years ago
- Founder: Gene Robinson
- Defunct: 2014
- Fate: Acquired
- Successor: Steris
- Headquarters: Birmingham, Alabama, United States
- Number of locations: 3
- Area served: Worldwide
- Key people: Gene Robinson (founder & CEO), Debra Robinson (managing partner)
- Services: Surgical Instrument and Device Repair, Sterile Process Management, Management of Instruments in Operating Room and Endoscopy Suite, Implant Tracking Software, Pre-owned Surgical Equipment, and Education.
- Revenue: $117 million (2012)
- Number of employees: 1,200 (2014)
- Subsidiaries: Wedge Manufacturing, Inc.

Integrated Medical Systems International (IMS) was an American surgical instrument management and clinical consulting company specializing in repair management, sterile process management, tracking, and other services related to surgical and endoscopic devices and instruments. It was acquired by the Steris Corporation of Mentor, Ohio in 2014.

The company operated repair facilities in Alabama, Florida, and Maryland. Prior to being acquired, IMS had more than 1,200 employees nationwide.

== History ==
The company was originally incorporated in 1982, as Gibson-Robinson, Inc., as a distributor of operating room products. In 1987, the company name was changed to IMS. The company focused on distributing until 1990, when repair services were added. The company provided a range of services and products related to operating room efficiency.

The company was acquired by Steris Corporation of Mentor, Ohio in 2014.

== Services ==
IMS provides refurbishment, education, process improvement, inventory management, and related services for 2,500 hospitals and surgery centers. IMS operates three repair facilities and performs on-Location repairs. It sells used equipment and repairs flexible and rigid endoscopes and stainless, laparoscopic, power, ophthalmic, and specialty instruments.

Additional services:

- Software for healthcare facilities for tracking allograft tissue, implants, and medical devices.
- Central Sterile Process Management including education, certification readiness, regulatory compliance, project management, OR/SPD asset management, and interim management and staffing.
- Surgical Endoscopy Solutions teams directly support minimally invasive procedures, providing room setup and breakdown, in-room trouble-shooting, instrument decontamination, preference card management, and maintenance or repair of instrumentation and scopes.

== Subsidiaries ==
Wedge Manufacturing was an IMS subsidiary that used Computer Numerical Control machinists to produce small parts for customers in the healthcare, aerospace, defense and other industries. In addition to production services, Wedge provides inspections, reverse engineering and prototype development. Wedge specializes in components for situations that require tight tolerances or unusual materials. In 2009, engineers at the University of Alabama at Birmingham worked with Wedge to create a bearing holder for the GLACIER cryogenic freezer, which the university was producing for use in the International Space Station.

== Sponsorships and partnerships ==
IMS sponsored Instruments of Mercy, Inc. is a non-profit organization. IOM repaired donated surgical instruments already in the hands of healthcare providers for mission trips. Instruments of Mercy has refurbished equipment for over 100 missions in over two dozen countries. Medical professionals preparing for mission trips may receive up to $6,000 in repair costs and up to 24 trips are supported annually. IOM's largest medical client was Mercy Ships.

IMS maintained relationships with professional organizations including: AORN, HSPA, The Society of Gastroenterology Nurses and Associates (SGNA), the Association of Medical Instrumentation (AAMI), and the Association for Healthcare Resource & Materials Management (AHRMM).

== Recognition ==
- Association of periOperative Registered Nurses' Jerry G. Peers Distinguished Service Award (2013)
