= Cantel Medical Corporation =

American healthcare company

Cantel Medical Corp.
- Type: Subsidiary
- Traded as: NYSE: CMD
- ISIN: US1380981084
- Industry: Medical devices
- Founded: 1963; 63 years ago
- Headquarters: Little Falls, New Jersey, U.S.
- Key people: Charles Michael Diker (Chairman); George L. Fotiades (President, CEO); Peter G. Clifford (COO, EVP); Shuan M. Blakeman (CFO, SVP)
- Products: Infection Prevention and compliance; Water Purification and Filtration
- Revenue: ▲US$871.92 million (2018)
- Operating income: ▲US$121.66 million (2018)
- Net income: ▲US$91.04 million (2018)
- Total assets: ▲US$963.71 million (2018)
- Total equity: ▲US$608.87 million (2018)
- Number of employees: ▲2,693 (July 31, 2018)
- Parent: Steris
- Divisions: MEDIVATORS Inc.; Mar Cor Purification; Crosstex International, Inc.
- Website: cantelmedical.com

Cantel Medical Corporation is an American company that produces and sells medical equipment. The company is based in Little Falls, New Jersey.

== History ==
Cantel Medical Corporation was founded in 1963 by Charles M. Diker in Little Falls, New Jersey.

The company purchased Minntech Corporation in 2001 for a reported $70 million.

In March 2018, the company acquired Belgium-based Aexis Medical for $24.8 million.

Cantel acquired Ashland, Ohio-based Vista Research Group for $10.5 million in January 2019. In October of that year, the company acquired Chicago-based dental instrument maker Hu-Friedy for $719.4 million.

In June 2021, Steris, an American medical equipment company, acquired Cantel Medical Corporation.
