= Dry decontamination =

Dry decontamination is a method of removing contaminants (such as chemicals, biological particles, or other liquids, gasses, or solids) without the need to use water or other liquids. Decontamination is an essential duty of hazmat responders as it protects victims from harmful reactions to the contaminants.

Dry decontamination is a relatively recent method of decontamination and is especially useful in cold weather conditions, or when water is scarce or difficult to transport. Dry decontamination reduces the size and manpower requirements of the decontamination line and eliminates the need to purchase excess equipment that becomes ineffective due to storage or infrequent use.

== Dry decontamination methods ==
Dry decontamination is usually performed after the removal of clothing and before a shower (when available). There are five different types of dry decontamination, each of which can be used in conjunction with others to remove up to 100% of all suspected contaminants:

1. Scraping
2. Absorbent materials
3. Adsorbent materials
4. Vacuuming
5. Pressurized air

=== Scraping ===
Scraping is a process of decontamination in which the bulk contaminant is removed from the victim or environment using a spatula, wooden tongue depressor, or other handheld implement. Scraping works best with viscous liquids and solids.

=== Absorbent materials ===
Absorbent materials are specifically made to absorb (or capture and contain) contaminants. Absorbent materials include FiberTect, Reactive Skin Decontamination Lotion (RSDL), Fuller's earth, flour, baking soda, paper towels, etc., all of which absorb hazardous materials from the victim. After absorption is completed using an absorbent material and immediate danger has passed, the contaminated surface should be blotted with a wet paper towel. An absorbent material increases in volume when a contaminant is absorbed.

==== DEC'POL ====
The DEC'POL® Emergency Decontamination Mitt is a polyvalent device that incorporates superabsorbent material with active agents for the destruction of chemical and biological contamination. The mitt was developed and is produced in Lyon, France, by clothes and fabric manufacturer Ouvry SAS. DEC'POL is available in cases of 20 mitts.

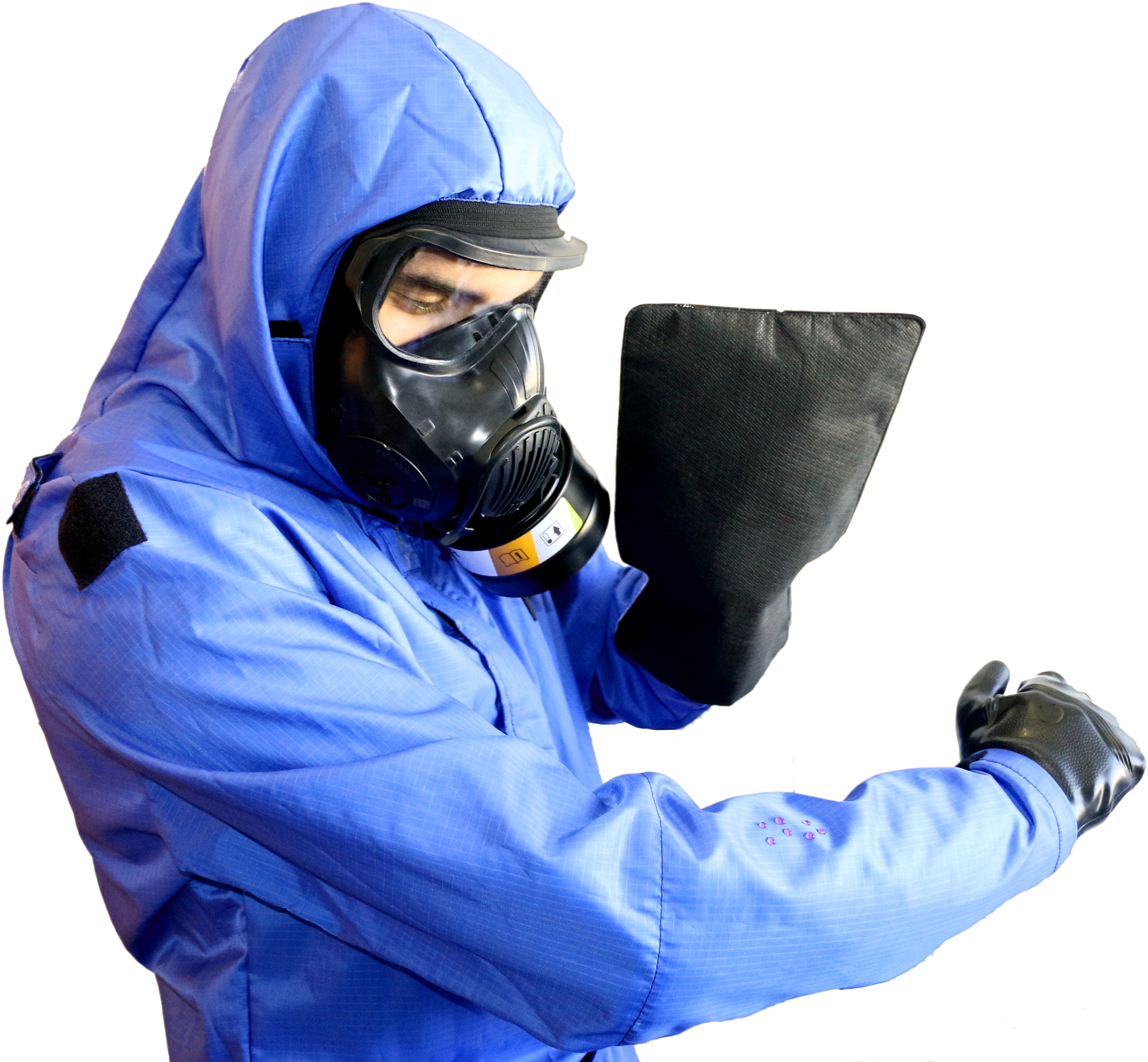
DEC'POL – Emergency Decontamination Mitt

==== FiberTect ====
FiberTect is a multi-layer nonwoven composite fabric that absorbs and adsorbs chemical, biological, and radiological contaminants. It is made of two layers of polyester with an inner layer of fibrous activated carbon. The three layers are needle-punched to form a single fabric that allows the material to be structurally sound while creating void spaces for better absorption and adsorption. FiberTect is available in wipes or mitts, which remove up to 90% of contaminants.

==== RSDL ====
RSDL (or Reactive Skin Decontamination Lotion) consists of an absorbent sponge applicator and a lotion that neutralizes toxic agents. RSDL removes or neutralizes chemical warfare agents, T-2 mycotoxins, and pesticides. RSDL is the standard decontamination means for many armed forces such as the US Army, Canadian Forces and the German Bundeswehr.

==== Fuller's earth ====
Fuller's earth is any clay material that has the ability to absorb oil, grease, etc. without chemical treatment. It is also used for filtering, clarifying, decoloring, and as a filler in paint. It is used by the military and first responders to decontaminate clothing and equipment.

=== Adsorbent materials ===
Adsorbent materials adhere to and encapsulate contaminants on various surfaces. Adsorbent materials do not increase in volume when a contaminant is absorbed.

=== Vacuuming ===
Vacuuming physically removes solid materials from victims and the contaminated environment. Vacuuming should only be done when the victim and all people in the vicinity are wearing respiratory protection and the usefulness of vacuuming can be limited by the availability of supplies, equipment, and electricity.

=== Pressurized air ===
Pressurized air uses low-pressure air streams to remove solid, dry contaminants from equipment and the environment. As with vacuuming, the use of pressurized air should be limited to situations where all people in the contaminated area are wearing personal protective equipment (PPE). The use of pressurized air is often not recommended because there are many hazards associated with the method, including respiratory and skin damage.

== Dry decon vs. wet decon ==
=== Advantages of dry decontamination ===
Dry decontamination reduces concerns associated with cold weather decontamination while also speeding up the decontamination process by allowing victims to self-decontaminate (or be decontaminated by a first responder with minimal cross-contamination). In addition, some contaminants are water-reactive and wet decontamination methods may only increase the potential hazards.

==== Time effectiveness ====
The deployment of a dry decontamination system allows the victim to assist in his/her own decontamination. In addition, dry decontamination operations are expedited by allowing for the quick removal of contaminants from the victim's skin, reducing the amount of time a victim is in contact with the contamination (which therefore minimizes the potential harm caused).

==== Cold weather decontamination ====
When conducting decontamination in temperatures below 36 °F, dry decontamination can be an effective solution that prevents more casualties resulting from hypothermia. Other sources recommend that wet decontamination be avoided in external temperatures of below 65 °F to avoid the adverse effects of cold shock.

==== Logistical issues ====
Wet decontamination lines require not only a water source, but occasionally electricity for deployment. As a rule, dry decontamination is faster both in deployment and clean-up as it does not require an immediate water supply, contaminated water collection basin, resources (like hoses, nozzles, shelters, and other large pieces of equipment), or a large number of personnel.

== Mass casualty decontamination ==
Large-scale decontamination often involves civilians who, unlike soldiers and responders, are not trained in decontamination methods. Currently, wet decontamination is most frequently used in large-scale decontamination efforts, during which civilians are directed by soldiers and responders to shower (usually with water and a detergent or bleach). Dry decontamination is proving to be a safer, more effective method of decontamination for large-scale incidents.
