= Vaporized hydrogen peroxide =

Vapor form of hydrogen peroxide

Vaporized hydrogen peroxide (trademarked VHP, also known as hydrogen peroxide vapor, HPV) is a vapor form of hydrogen peroxide (H_{2}O_{2}) with applications as a low-temperature antimicrobial vapor used to decontaminate enclosed and sealed areas such as laboratory workstations, isolation and pass-through rooms, and even aircraft interiors.

== Use as sterilant ==
=== Regulatory status ===
VHP is registered by the U.S. Environmental Protection Agency as a sterilant, which the EPA defines as "a substance that destroys or eliminates all forms of microbial life in the inanimate environment, including all forms of vegetative bacteria, bacterial spores, fungi, fungal spores, and viruses". As a sterilant, VHP is one of the chemicals approved for decontamination of anthrax spores from contaminated buildings, such as occurred during the 2001 anthrax attacks in the U.S. It has also been shown to be effective in removing exotic animal viruses, such as avian influenza and Newcastle disease from equipment and surfaces.

=== Application ===
VHP is produced from a solution of liquid H_{2}O_{2} and water, by generators specifically designed for the purpose. These generators initially dehumidify the ambient air, then produce VHP by passing aqueous hydrogen peroxide over a vaporizer, and circulate the vapor at a programmed concentration in the air, typically from 140 ppm to 1400 ppm, depending on the infectious agent to be cleared. By comparison, a concentration of 75 ppm is considered to be "Immediately Dangerous to Life or Health" in humans. After the VHP has circulated in the enclosed space for a pre-defined period, it is circulated back through the generator, where it is broken down into water and oxygen by a catalytic converter until concentrations of VHP fall to safe levels (typically <1 ppm). Alternatively, the VHP is vented to the outside air, in cases where recapturing of the VHP is not needed.

=== Use in hospitals ===
Vaporized hydrogen peroxide has been investigated as an airborne disinfectant and infection control measure for hospitals and has been shown to reduce incidence of nosocomial infections from several pathogens. Clostridioides difficile associated disease, VRE and MRSA are all associated with environmental contamination. H_{2}O_{2} vapor has been used in hospitals to eradicate causal agents, e.g., antibiotic-resistant Klebsiella pneumoniae, from the environment and prevent infection of subsequent patients.

=== Monitoring technologies ===
OSHA mandates a PEL of 1.0 ppm (1.4 mg/m ) for HPV. Typically, safe working environments around sterilization equipment is achieved with electrochemical sensors capable of measuring in the parts per billion and low parts per million levels. These sensors are typically inexpensive and limited to ambient conditions. Moreover, HPV electrochemical sensors are often located near the sterilization equipment to detect possible leaks during the sterilization cycle. In 2014, Advanced Sterilization Products (ASP), sovaldi the manufacturer of the Sterrad hydrogen peroxide gas plasma sterilizer, issued a letter to hospital risk managers warning them that hydrogen peroxide residues may be found in the sterilization load. HPV being present in the sterilization load, could lead the accidental exposure of hospital staff.

Monitoring hydrogen peroxide levels inside the sterilization chamber during the sterilization cycle can be challenging. Technical issues such as condensation, vacuum, and high concentration have prevented many sensing technologies such as electrochemical sensors from providing real-time monitoring of H_{2}O_{2} concentration. Under these conditions, optical methods such as spectroscopy can be used to ensure that lethal concentrations of H_{2}O_{2} are achieved in the sterilization chamber.
