= Healthcare Sterile Processing Association =

- Abbreviation: HSPA
- Type: 501(c)(6)
- Registration no.: 36-6066612
- Headquarters: Chicago, IL
- CEO: Susan Adams, BA, CAE
- Revenue: US$7.32 million (2022)
- Expenses: US$7.61 million (2022)
- Website: myhspa.org

The Healthcare Sterile Processing Association (HSPA), formerly International Association of Health Central Service Material Management (IAHSCMM), is a professional association which represents sterile processing professionals, and is based in Chicago, Illinois with over 48,000 members worldwide.

HSPA in association with Purdue University provides education and professional certification for central service personnel in the field. These certifications include:

- Certified Registered Central Service Technician (CRCST)
- Certified Endoscope Reprocessor (CER)
- Certified Instrument Specialist (CIS)
- Certified Healthcare Leadership (CHL)
- Certified Central Service Vendor Program (CCSVP)

== Publications ==
HSPA publishes several manuals to support the educational component of the certifications offered. These include:

- Endoscope Reprocessing Manual, 2nd Edition
- Instrument Resource Manual, 1st Edition
- Sterile Processing Leadership Manual, 4th edition
- Sterile Processing Technical Manual, 9th Edition, with accompanying study workbook
- Instrument Care and Handling: Preventing Damage and Prolonging Instrument Life
- PROCESS, a bimonthly professional journal
- Insights, a biweekly newsletter
