= Spaulding classification =

Earle Spaulding of Temple University (Philadelphia, Pennsylvania) in a 1939 paper on disinfection of surgical instruments in a chemical solution proposed "a strategy for sterilization or disinfection of inanimate objects and surfaces based on the degree of risk involved in their use". In order to simplify the nature of the disinfection process, Spaulding classified instruments and items used in patient care according to infection risk into "critical", "semicritical", and "noncritical" categories. He also classified levels of germicidal activity as "high", "intermediate", and "low". While influential, the Spaulding scheme is susceptible to oversimplification and can be difficult to implement.
