= Sterilization (microbiology) =

Process that eliminates all biological agents on an object or in a volume

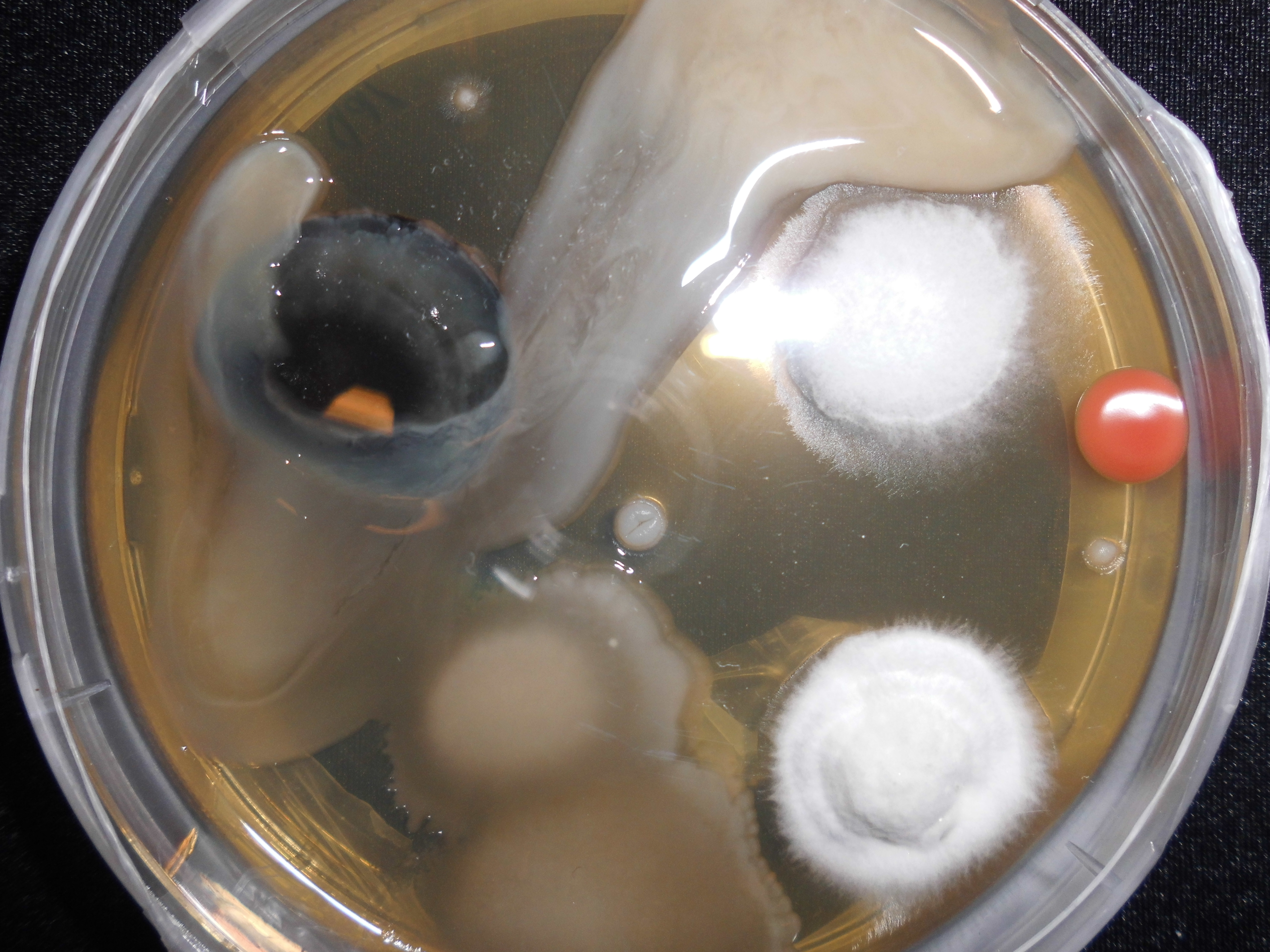
Microorganisms growing on an agar plate

Sterilization (British English: sterilisation) refers to any process that removes, kills, or deactivates all forms of life (particularly microorganisms such as fungi, bacteria, spores, and unicellular eukaryotic organisms) and other biological agents (such as prions or viruses) present in fluid or on a specific surface or object. Sterilization can be achieved through various means, including heat, chemicals, irradiation, high pressure, and filtration. Sterilization is distinct from disinfection, sanitization, and pasteurization, in that those methods reduce rather than eliminate all forms of life and biological agents present. After sterilization, fluid or an object is referred to as being sterile or aseptic.

== Applications ==
=== Foods ===
One of the first steps toward modernized sterilization was made by Nicolas Appert, who discovered that application of heat over a suitable period of time slowed the decay of foods and various liquids, preserving them for safe consumption for a longer time than was typical. In the early 1900's the use of baby bottle sterilization became an important tool in the battle of infant mortality. Canning of foods is an extension of the same principle and has helped to reduce food borne illness ("food poisoning"). Other methods of sterilizing foods include ultra-high temperature processing (which uses a shorter duration of heating), food irradiation, and high pressure (pascalization).

In the context of food, sterility typically refers to commercial sterility, defined as "the absence of microorganisms capable of growing in the food at normal non-refrigerated conditions at which the food is likely to be held during distribution and storage" according to the Codex Alimentarius.

=== Medicine and surgery ===
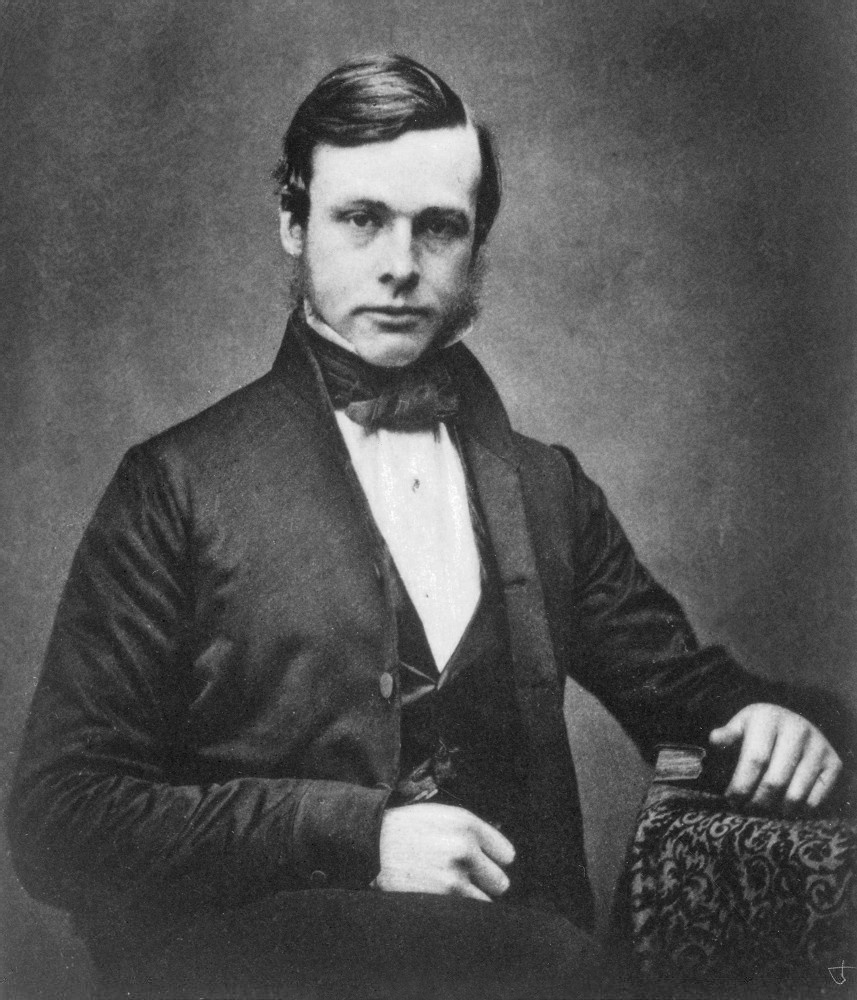
Joseph Lister, a pioneer of antiseptic surgery.

Apparatus to sterilize surgical instruments (1914–1918)

In general, surgical instruments and medications that enter an already aseptic part of the body (such as the bloodstream, or penetrating the skin) must be sterile. Examples of such instruments include scalpels, hypodermic needles, and artificial pacemakers. This is also essential in the manufacture of parenteral pharmaceuticals.

Preparation of injectable medications and intravenous solutions for fluid replacement therapy requires not only sterility but also well-designed containers to prevent entry of adventitious agents after initial product sterilization.

The sterilization of surgical instruments by boiling, dry heat, and flame treatment was introduced around 1883 by Octave Roche Simon Terrillon. The general introduction of steam sterilization into surgery occurred in 1886 by Ernst von Bergmann and Curt Schimmelbusch. In 1890 the use of an Arnold Steam Cooker for sterilization of medical instruments was published and demonstrated by Dr. Herbert E. Smith. Within a year modifications were made creating the Arnold Sterilizer as laboratories and physicians documented the success of steam sterilization.Most medical and surgical devices used in healthcare facilities are made of materials that are able to undergo steam sterilization, typically, since the late 20th century, within sterile processing facilities. However, since 1950, there has been an increase in medical devices and instruments made of materials (e.g., plastics) that require low-temperature sterilization. Ethylene oxide gas has been used since the 1950s for heat- and moisture-sensitive medical devices. Within the past 15 years, a number of new, low-temperature sterilization systems (e.g., vaporized hydrogen peroxide, peracetic acid immersion, ozone) have been developed and are being used to sterilize medical devices.

=== Spacecraft ===
There are strict international rules to protect the contamination of Solar System bodies from biological material from Earth. Standards vary depending on both the type of mission and its destination; the more likely a planet is considered to be habitable, the stricter the requirements are.

Many components of instruments used on spacecraft cannot withstand very high temperatures, so techniques not requiring excessive temperatures are used as tolerated, including heating to at least 120 °C (248 °F), chemical sterilization, oxidization, ultraviolet, and irradiation.

== Quantification ==
Sterilization aims to reduce or eliminate microorganisms and other potential pathogens present in a material. In laboratory and industrial practice, steam sterilization is commonly used for culture media, except when treating heat-labile components. Microbial death by heat generally follows first-order kinetics, which can be expressed as: $-{dN \over dt} = kN$

where $N$ is the number of viable microorganisms, $t$ is the sterilization time, and $k$ is the specific death rate constant. Integration yields:

$\ln\left(\frac{N}{N_0}\right) = -kt$

where $N_0$ is the initial number of microorganisms.

The degree of sterilization is often quantified using the decimal reduction time, or D-value, defined as the time required to reduce $N_0$ by one logarithmic unit (i.e to $10^{-1} \times N_0$) or when initial population is reduced by one-tenth ($10^{-1}$). The surviving population after time t can then be expressed as:

$N = N_0 \times 10^{-t/D}$

The D-value is a function of sterilization conditions and varies with the type of microorganism, temperature, water activity, pH, etc.

As in any first-order reaction, the reaction rate increases with temperature due to an increase in the rate constant $k$. For thermal destruction of microorganisms, the specific death rate remains constant at a constant temperature. The dependence of $k$ on temperature follows the Arrhenius relationship:

$k = A e^{-\frac{E}{RT}}$

where $A$ is a constant known as Arrhenius factor, $E$ is the activation energy, $R$ is the gas constant, and $T$ is absolute temperature. Now, combining the first-order death kinetics with the Arrhenius equation results in the following expression for heat sterilization of a pure culture at constant temperature:

$\ln\!\left(\frac{N}{N_0}\right) = -\,A\,t\,e^{-\frac{E}{RT}}$

or, $\ln N = \ln N_0 - At e^{-\frac{E}{RT}}$

Theoretically, the likelihood of the survival of an individual microorganism is never zero. To compensate for this, the overkill method is often used. Using the overkill method, sterilization is performed by sterilizing for longer than is required to kill the bioburden present on or in the item being sterilized. This provides a sterility assurance level (SAL) equal to the probability of a non-sterile unit.

For high-risk applications, such as medical devices and injections, a sterility assurance level of at least 10^{−6} is required by the United States of America Food and Drug Administration (FDA).

== Heat ==
=== Steam ===
Steam sterilization, also known as moist heat sterilization, uses heated saturated steam under pressure to inactivate or kill microorganisms via denaturation of macromolecules, primarily proteins. This method is a faster process than dry heat sterilization. Steam sterilization is performed using an autoclave, sometimes called a converter or steam sterilizer. The object or liquid is placed in the autoclave chamber, which is then sealed and heated using pressurized steam to a temperature set point for a defined period of time. Steam sterilization cycles can be categorized as either pre-vacuum or gravity displacement. Gravity displacement cycles rely on the lower density of the injected steam to force cooler, denser air out of the chamber drain. In comparison, pre-vacuum cycles create a vacuum in the chamber to remove cool dry air prior to injecting saturated steam, resulting in faster heating and shorter cycle times. Typical steam sterilization cycles are between 3 and 30 minutes at 121–134 °C (250–273 °F) at 100 kPa (15 psi), but adjustments may be made depending on the bioburden of the article being sterilized, its resistance (D-value) to steam sterilization, the article's heat tolerance, and the required sterility assurance level. Following the completion of a cycle, liquids in a pressurized autoclave must be cooled slowly to avoid boiling over when the pressure is released. This may be achieved by gradually depressurizing the sterilization chamber and allowing liquids to evaporate under a negative pressure, while cooling the contents.

Proper autoclave treatment will inactivate all resistant bacterial spores in addition to fungi, bacteria, and viruses, but is not expected to eliminate all prions, which vary in their heat resistance. For prion elimination, various recommendations state 121–132 °C (250–270 °F) for 60 minutes or 134 °C (273 °F) for at least 18 minutes. The 263K scrapie prion is inactivated relatively quickly by such sterilization procedures; however, other strains of scrapie and strains of Creutzfeldt-Jakob disease (CKD) and bovine spongiform encephalopathy (BSE) are more resistant. Using mice as test animals, one experiment showed that heating BSE positive brain tissue at 134–138 °C (273–280 °F) for 18 minutes resulted in only a 2.5 log decrease in prion infectivity.

Most autoclaves have meters and charts that record or display information, particularly temperature and pressure as a function of time. The information is checked to ensure that the conditions required for sterilization have been met. Indicator tape is often placed on the packages of products prior to autoclaving, and some packaging incorporates indicators. The indicator changes color when exposed to steam, providing a visual confirmation.

Biological indicators can also be used to independently confirm autoclave performance. Simple biological indicator devices are commercially available, based on microbial spores. Most contain spores of the heat-resistant microbe Geobacillus stearothermophilus (formerly Bacillus stearothermophilus), which is extremely resistant to steam sterilization. Biological indicators may take the form of glass vials of spores and liquid media, or as spores on strips of paper inside glassine envelopes. These indicators are placed in locations where it is difficult for steam to reach to verify that steam is penetrating that area.

For autoclaving, cleaning is critical. Extraneous biological matter or grime may shield organisms from steam penetration. Proper cleaning can be achieved through physical scrubbing, sonication, ultrasound, or pulsed air.

Pressure cooking and canning is analogous to autoclaving, and when performed correctly renders food sterile.

To sterilize waste materials that are chiefly composed of liquid, a purpose-built effluent decontamination system can be utilized. These devices can function using a variety of sterilants, although using heat via steam is most common.

=== Dry ===
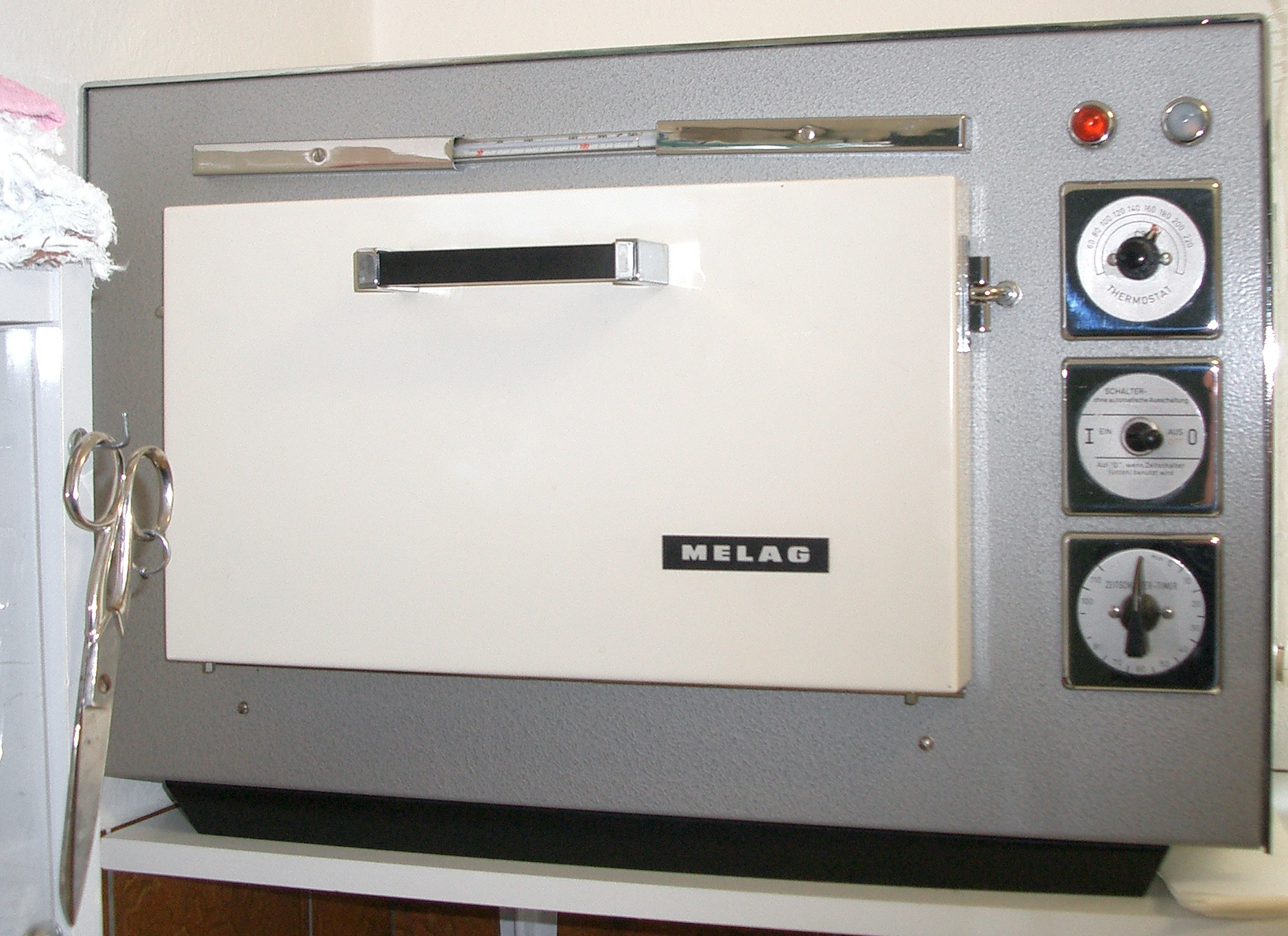
Dry heat sterilizer

Dry heat was the first method of sterilization and is a longer process than moist heat sterilization. The destruction of microorganisms through the use of dry heat is a gradual phenomenon. With longer exposure to lethal temperatures, the number of killed microorganisms increases. Forced ventilation of hot air can be used to increase the rate at which heat is transferred to an organism and reduce the temperature and amount of time needed to achieve sterility. At higher temperatures, shorter exposure times are required to kill organisms. This can reduce heat-induced damage to food products.

The standard setting for a hot air oven is at least two hours at 160 °C (320 °F). A rapid method heats air to 463.15 K (190.00 °C; 374.00 °F) for 6 minutes for unwrapped objects and 12 minutes for wrapped objects. Dry heat has the advantage that it can be used on powders and other heat-stable items that are adversely affected by steam (e.g., it does not cause rusting of steel objects).

=== Flaming ===
Flaming is done to inoculation loops and straight-wires in microbiology labs for streaking. Leaving the loop in the flame of a Bunsen burner or alcohol burner until it glows red ensures that any infectious agent is inactivated or killed. This is commonly used for small metal or glass objects, but not for large objects (see Incineration below). However, during the initial heating, infectious material may be sprayed from the wire surface before it is killed, contaminating nearby surfaces and objects. Therefore, special heaters have been developed that surround the inoculating loop with a heated cage, ensuring that such sprayed material does not further contaminate the area. Another problem is that gas flames may leave carbon or other residues on the object if the object is not heated enough. A variation on flaming is to dip the object in a 70% or more concentrated solution of ethanol, then briefly leave the object in the flame of a Bunsen burner. The ethanol will ignite and burn off rapidly, leaving less residue than a gas flame

=== Incineration ===
Incineration is a waste treatment process that involves the combustion of organic substances contained in waste materials. This method also burns any organism to ash. It is used to sterilize medical and other biohazardous waste before it is discarded with non-hazardous waste. Bacteria incinerators are mini furnaces that incinerate and kill off any microorganisms that may be on an inoculating loop or wire.

=== Tyndallization ===
Named after John Tyndall, tyndallization is an obsolete and lengthy process designed to reduce the level of activity of sporulating microbes that are left by a simple boiling water method. The process involves boiling for a period of time (typically 20 minutes) at atmospheric pressure, cooling, incubating for a day, and then repeating the process a total of three to four times. The incubation allow heat-resistant spores surviving the previous boiling period to germinate and form the heat-sensitive vegetative (growing) stage, which can be killed by the next boiling step. This is effective because many spores are stimulated to grow by the heat shock. The procedure only works for media that can support bacterial growth, and will not sterilize non-nutritive substrates like water. Tyndallization is also ineffective against prions.

=== Glass bead sterilizers ===
Glass bead sterilizers work by heating glass beads to 250 °C (482 °F). Instruments are then quickly doused in these glass beads, which heat the object while physically scraping contaminants off their surface. Glass bead sterilizers were once a common sterilization method employed in dental offices as well as biological laboratories, but are not approved by the U.S. Food and Drug Administration (FDA) and Centers for Disease Control and Prevention (CDC) to be used as a sterilizers since 1997. They are still popular in European and Israeli dental practices, although there are no current evidence-based guidelines for using this sterilizer.

== Chemical sterilization ==
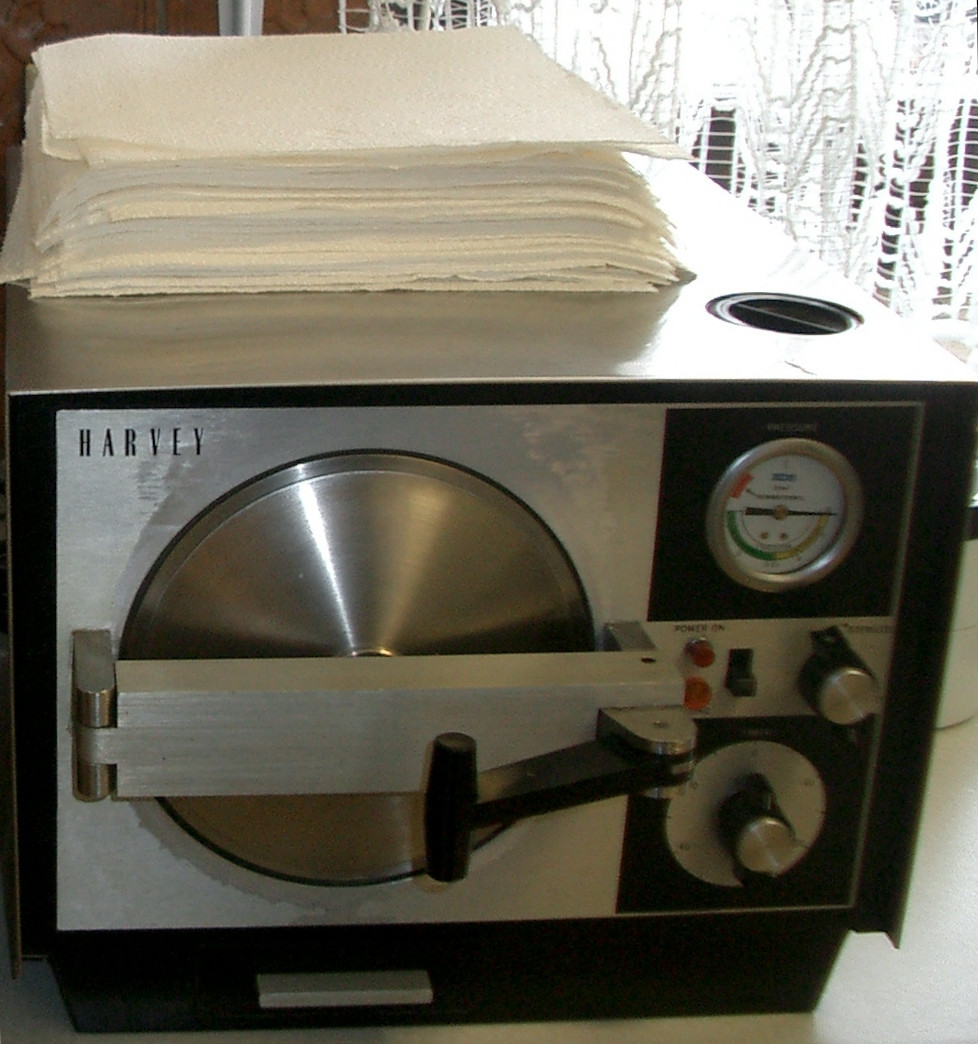
Chemiclav

Chemicals are also used for sterilization. Heating provides a reliable way to rid objects of all transmissible agents, but it is not always appropriate if it will damage heat-sensitive materials such as biological materials, fiber optics, electronics, and many plastics. In these situations, chemicals either in a gaseous or liquid form, can be used as sterilants. While the use of gas and liquid chemical sterilants avoids the problem of heat damage, users must ensure that the article to be sterilized is chemically compatible with the sterilant being used and that the sterilant is able to reach all surfaces that must be sterilized (typically cannot penetrate packaging). In addition, the use of chemical sterilants poses new challenges for workplace safety, as the properties that make chemicals effective sterilants usually make them harmful to humans. The procedure for removing sterilant residue from the sterilized materials varies depending on the chemical and process that is used.

=== Ethylene oxide ===
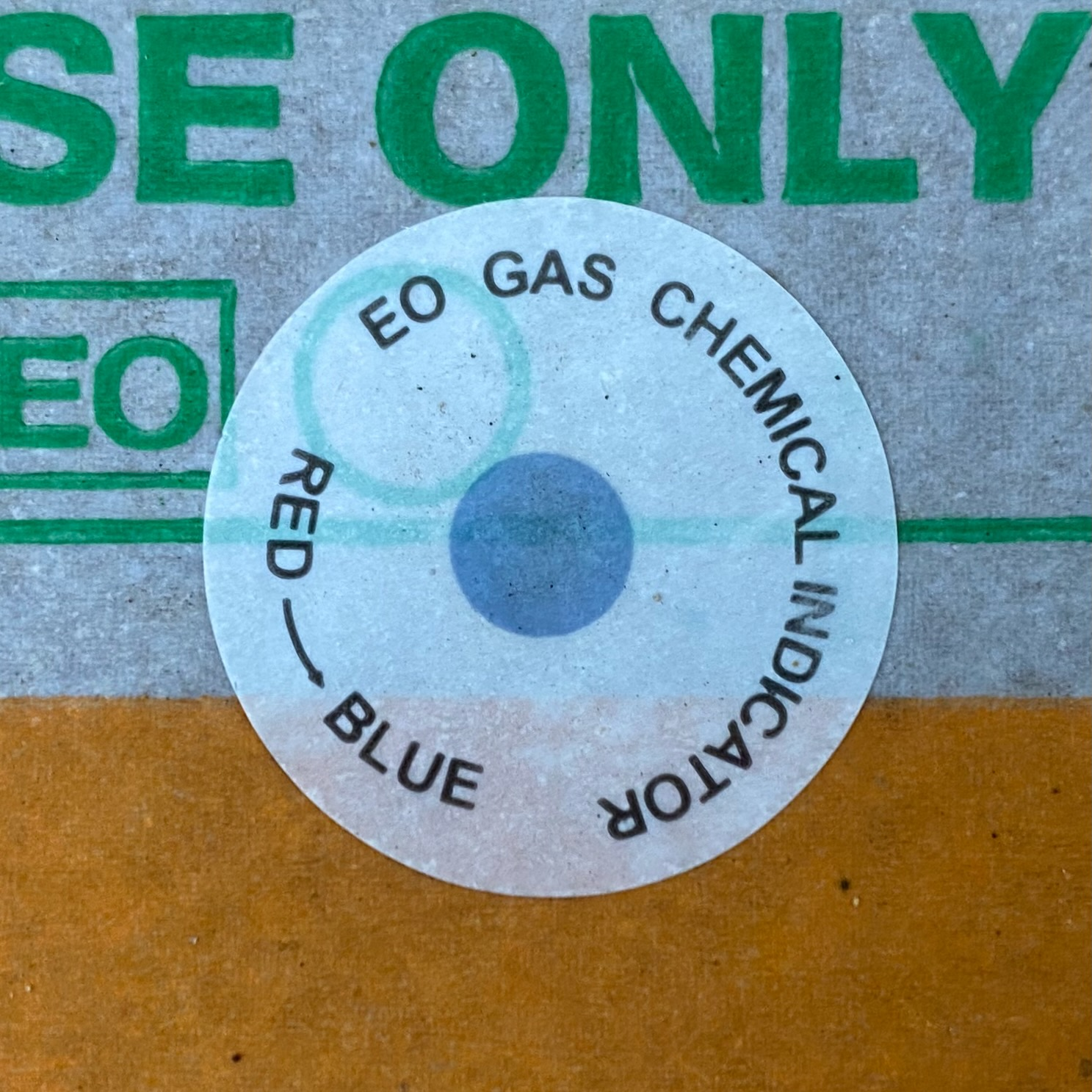
EO sterilisation sticker on a box of medical supplies. The colour turns from red to blue permanently in the presence of EO

Ethylene oxide (EO, EtO) gas treatment is one of the common methods used to sterilize, pasteurize, or disinfect items because of its wide range of material compatibility. It is also used to process items that are sensitive to processing with other methods, such as radiation (gamma, electron beam, X-ray), heat (moist or dry), or other chemicals. Ethylene oxide treatment is the most common chemical sterilization method, used for approximately 70% of total sterilizations, and for over 50% of all disposable medical devices.

Ethylene oxide treatment is generally carried out between 30 and 60 °C (86 and 140 °F) with relative humidity above 30% and a gas concentration between 200 and 800 mg/L. Typically, the process lasts for several hours. Ethylene oxide is highly effective, as it penetrates all porous materials, and it can penetrate through some plastic materials and films. Ethylene oxide kills all known microorganisms, such as bacteria (including spores), viruses, and fungi (including yeasts and moulds), and is compatible with almost all materials even when used repeatedly. It is flammable, toxic, and carcinogenic; however, only with a reported potential for some adverse health effects when not used in compliance with published requirements. Ethylene oxide sterilizers and processes require biological validation after sterilizer installation, significant repairs, or process changes.

The traditional process consists of a preconditioning phase (in a separate room or cell), a processing phase (more commonly in a vacuum vessel and sometimes in a pressure rated vessel), and an aeration phase (in a separate room or cell) to remove EO residues and lower by-products such as ethylene chlorohydrin (EC or ECH) and, of lesser importance, ethylene glycol (EG). An alternative process, known as all-in-one processing, also exists for some products whereby all three phases are performed in the vacuum or pressure rated vessel. This latter option can facilitate faster overall processing time and residue dissipation.

The most common EO processing method is the gas chamber. To benefit from economies of scale, EO has traditionally been delivered by filling a large chamber with a combination of gaseous EO, either as pure EO, or with other gases used as diluents; diluents include chlorofluorocarbons (CFCs), hydrochlorofluorocarbons (HCFCs), and carbon dioxide.

Ethylene oxide is still widely used by medical device manufacturers. Since EO is explosive at concentrations above 3%, EO was traditionally supplied with an inert carrier gas, such as a CFC or HCFC. The use of CFCs or HCFCs as the carrier gas was banned because of concerns of ozone depletion. These halogenated hydrocarbons are being replaced by systems using 100% EO, because of regulations and the high cost of the blends. In hospitals, most EO sterilizers use single-use cartridges because of the convenience and ease of use compared to the former plumbed gas cylinders of EO blends.

It is important to adhere to patient and healthcare personnel government specified limits of EO residues in and/or on processed products, operator exposure after processing, during storage and handling of EO gas cylinders, and environmental emissions produced when using EO.

The U.S. Occupational Safety and Health Administration (OSHA) has set the permissible exposure limit (PEL) at 1 ppm – calculated as an 8-hour time-weighted average (TWA) – and 5 ppm as a 15-minute excursion limit (EL). The National Institute for Occupational Safety and Health's (NIOSH) immediately dangerous to life and health limit (IDLH) for EO is 800 ppm. The odor threshold is around 500 ppm, so EO is imperceptible until concentrations are well above the OSHA PEL. Therefore, OSHA recommends that continuous gas monitoring systems be used to protect workers using EO for processing.

=== Nitrogen dioxide ===
Nitrogen dioxide (NO_{2}) gas is a rapid and effective sterilant for use against a wide range of microorganisms, including common bacteria, viruses, and spores. The unique physical properties of NO_{2} gas allow for sterilant dispersion in an enclosed environment at room temperature and atmospheric pressure. The mechanism for lethality is the degradation of DNA in the spore's core through nitration of the phosphate backbone, which kills the exposed organism as it absorbs NO_{2}. This degradations occurs at even very low concentrations of the gas. NO_{2} has a boiling point of 21 °C (70 °F) at sea level, which results in a relatively high saturated vapour pressure at ambient temperature. Because of this, liquid NO_{2} may be used as a convenient source for the sterilant gas. Liquid NO_{2} is often referred to by the name of its dimer, dinitrogen tetroxide (N_{2}O_{4}). Additionally, the low levels of concentration required, coupled with the high vapour pressure, assures that no condensation occurs on the devices being sterilized. This means that no aeration of the devices is required immediately following the sterilization cycle. NO_{2} is also less corrosive than other sterilant gases, and is compatible with most medical materials and adhesives.

The most-resistant organism (MRO) to sterilization with NO_{2} gas is the spore of Geobacillus stearothermophilus, which is the same MRO for both steam and hydrogen peroxide sterilization processes. The spore form of G. stearothermophilus has been well characterized over the years as a biological indicator in sterilization applications. Microbial inactivation of G. stearothermophilus with NO_{2} gas proceeds rapidly in a log-linear fashion, as is typical of other sterilization processes. Noxilizer, Inc. has commercialized this technology to offer contract sterilization services for medical devices at its Baltimore, Maryland (USA) facility. This has been demonstrated in Noxilizer's lab in multiple studies and is supported by published reports from other labs. These same properties also allow for quicker removal of the sterilant and residual gases through aeration of the enclosed environment. The combination of rapid lethality and easy removal of the gas allows for shorter overall cycle times during the sterilization (or decontamination) process and a lower level of sterilant residuals than are found with other sterilization methods. Eniware, LLC has developed a portable, power-free sterilizer that uses no electricity, heat, or water. The 25 liter unit makes sterilization of surgical instruments possible for austere forward surgical teams, in health centers throughout the world with intermittent or no electricity and in disaster relief and humanitarian crisis situations. The 4-hour cycle uses a single use gas generation ampoule and a disposable scrubber to remove NO_{2} gas.

=== Ozone ===
Ozone is used in industrial settings to sterilize water and air, as well as a disinfectant for surfaces. It has the benefit of being able to oxidize most organic matter. On the other hand, it is a toxic and unstable gas that must be produced on-site, so it is not practical to use in many settings.

Ozone offers many advantages as a sterilant gas; ozone is a very efficient sterilant because of its strong oxidizing properties (E=2.076 vs SHE) capable of destroying a wide range of pathogens, including prions, without the need for handling hazardous chemicals since the ozone is generated within the sterilizer from medical-grade oxygen. The high reactivity of ozone means that waste ozone can be destroyed by passing over a simple catalyst that reverts it to oxygen and ensures that the cycle time is relatively short. The disadvantage of using ozone is that the gas is very reactive and very hazardous. The NIOSH's IDLH for ozone is 5 ppm, 160 times smaller than the 800 ppm IDLH for ethylene oxide. NIOSH and OSHA have set the PEL for ozone at 0.1 ppm, calculated as an 8-hour time-weighted average. The sterilant gas manufacturers include many safety features in their products but prudent practice is to provide continuous monitoring of exposure to ozone, in order to provide a rapid warning in the event of a leak. Monitors for determining workplace exposure to ozone are commercially available.

=== Glutaraldehyde and formaldehyde ===
Glutaraldehyde and formaldehyde solutions (also used as fixatives) are accepted liquid sterilizing agents, provided that the immersion time is sufficiently long. To kill all spores in a clear liquid can take up to 22 hours with glutaraldehyde and even longer with formaldehyde. The presence of solid particles may lengthen the required period or render the treatment ineffective. Sterilization of blocks of tissue can take much longer, due to the time required for the fixative to penetrate. Glutaraldehyde and formaldehyde are volatile, and toxic by both skin contact and inhalation. Glutaraldehyde has a short shelf-life (<2 weeks), and is expensive. Formaldehyde is less expensive and has a much longer shelf-life if some methanol is added to inhibit polymerization of the chemical to paraformaldehyde, but is much more volatile. Formaldehyde is also used as a gaseous sterilizing agent; in this case, it is prepared on-site by depolymerization of solid paraformaldehyde. Many vaccines, such as the original Salk polio vaccine, are sterilized with formaldehyde.

=== Hydrogen peroxide ===
Hydrogen peroxide, in both liquid, vaporized hydrogen peroxide (VHP), and ionized hydrogen peroxide (iHP), are other chemical sterilizing agents. Hydrogen peroxide is a strong oxidant, which allows it to destroy a wide range of pathogens. Hydrogen peroxide is used to sterilize heat- or temperature-sensitive articles, such as rigid endoscopes. In medical sterilization, hydrogen peroxide is used at higher concentrations, ranging from around 35% up to 90%. The biggest advantage of hydrogen peroxide as a sterilant is the short cycle time. Whereas the cycle time for ethylene oxide may be 10 to 15 hours, some modern hydrogen peroxide sterilizers have a cycle time as short as 28 minutes.

Drawbacks of hydrogen peroxide include material compatibility, a lower capability for penetration and operator health risks. Products containing cellulose, such as paper, cannot be sterilized using VHP and products containing nylon may become brittle. The penetrating ability of hydrogen peroxide is not as good as ethylene oxide and so there are limitations on the length and diameter of the lumen of objects that can be effectively sterilized. Hydrogen peroxide is a primary irritant and the contact of the liquid solution with skin will cause bleaching or ulceration depending on the concentration and contact time. It is relatively non-toxic when diluted to low concentrations, but is a dangerous oxidizer at high concentrations (> 10% w/w). The vapour is also hazardous, primarily affecting the eyes and respiratory system. Even short-term exposures can be hazardous and NIOSH has set the IDLH at 75 ppm, less than 1/10 the IDLH for ethylene oxide (800 ppm). Prolonged exposure to lower concentrations can cause permanent lung damage and consequently, OSHA has set the permissible exposure limit to 1.0 ppm, calculated as an 8-hour time-weighted average. Sterilizer manufacturers go to great lengths to make their products safe through careful design and incorporation of many safety features, though there are still workplace exposures of hydrogen peroxide from gas sterilizers documented in the FDA Manufacturer and User Facility Device Experience (MAUDE) database. When using any type of gas sterilizer, prudent work practices should include good ventilation, a continuous gas monitor for hydrogen peroxide, and good work practices and training.

Vaporized hydrogen peroxide (VHP) and ionized hydrogen peroxide (iHP) are used to sterilize large enclosed and sealed areas, such as entire rooms and aircraft interiors.

VHP and iHP break down in a short time to water and oxygen.

=== Peracetic acid ===
Peracetic acid (0.2%) is a recognized sterilant by the FDA for use in sterilizing medical devices such as endoscopes. Peracetic acid which is also known as peroxyacetic acid is a chemical compound often used in disinfectants such as sanitizers. It is most commonly produced by the reaction of acetic acid with hydrogen peroxide by using an acid catalyst. Peracetic acid is never sold in un-stabilized solutions which is why it is considered to be environmentally friendly. Peracetic acid is a colorless liquid and the molecular formula of peracetic acid is C_{2}H_{4}O_{3} or CH_{3}COOOH. More recently, peracetic acid is being used throughout the world as more people are using fumigation to decontaminate surfaces to reduce the risk of COVID-19 and other diseases.

=== Potential for chemical sterilization of prions ===
Prions are highly resistant to chemical sterilization. Treatment with aldehydes, such as formaldehyde, have actually been shown to increase prion resistance. Hydrogen peroxide (3%) used for 1 hour was shown to be ineffective, providing less than 3 logs (10^{−3}) reduction in contamination. Iodine, formaldehyde, glutaraldehyde, and peracetic acid also fail this test (1 hour treatment). Only chlorine, phenolic compounds, guanidinium thiocyanate, and sodium hydroxide reduce prion levels by more than 4 logs; chlorine (too corrosive to use on certain objects) and sodium hydroxide are the most consistent. Many studies have shown the effectiveness of sodium hydroxide.

== Radiation sterilization ==
Sterilization can be achieved using electromagnetic radiation, such as ultraviolet light (UV), X-rays, and gamma rays, or irradiation by subatomic particles such as electron beams. Electromagnetic or particulate radiation can be energetic enough to ionize atoms or molecules (ionizing radiation), or less energetic (non-ionizing radiation).

=== Non-ionizing radiation sterilization ===
UV irradiation (from a germicidal lamp) is useful for sterilization of surfaces and some transparent objects. Many objects that are transparent to visible light absorb UV. UV irradiation is routinely used to sterilize the interiors of biological safety cabinets between uses, but is ineffective in shaded areas, including areas under dirt (which may become polymerized after prolonged irradiation, so that it is very difficult to remove). It also damages some plastics, such as polystyrene foam if exposed for prolonged periods of time.

=== Ionizing radiation sterilization ===
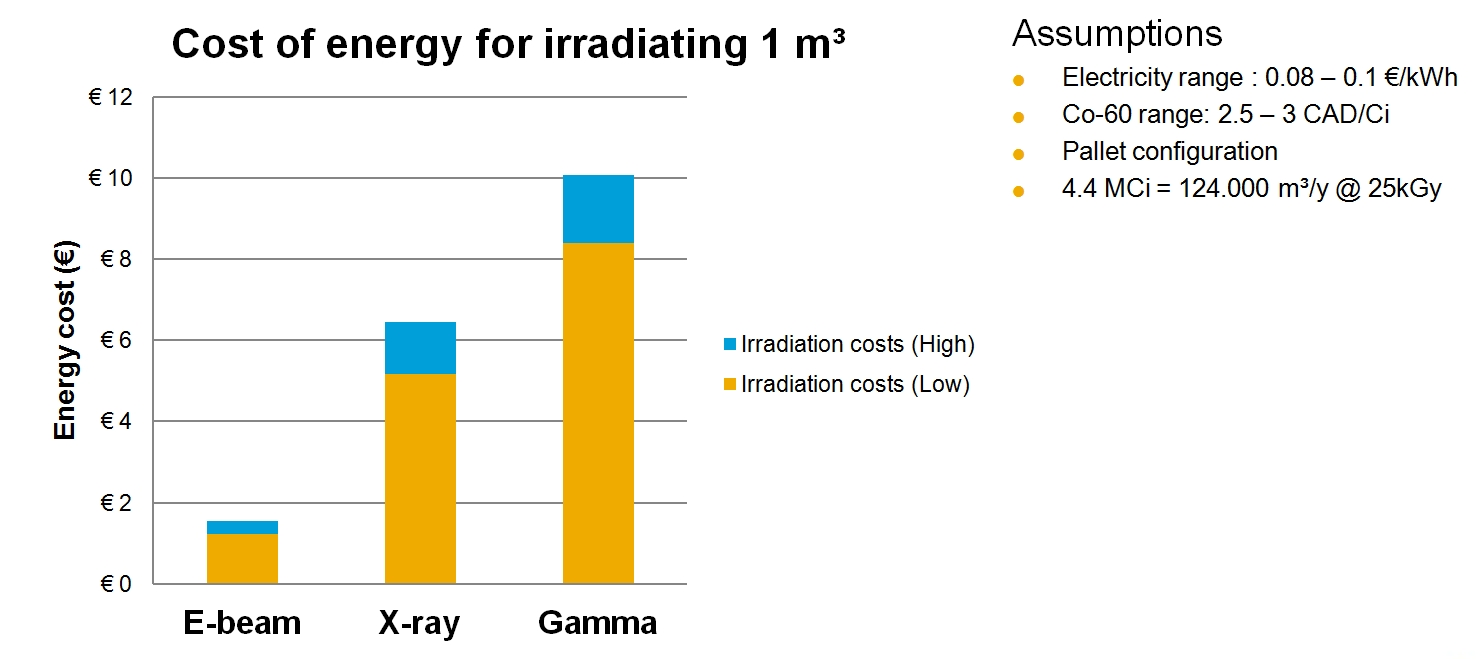
Efficiency illustration of the different radiation technologies (electron beam, X-ray, gamma rays)

The safety of irradiation facilities is regulated by the International Atomic Energy Agency of the United Nations and monitored by the different national Nuclear Regulatory Commissions (NRC). The radiation exposure accidents that have occurred in the past are documented by the agency and thoroughly analyzed to determine the cause and improvement potential. Such improvements are then mandated to retrofit existing facilities and future design.

Gamma radiation is very penetrating, and is commonly used for sterilization of disposable medical equipment, such as syringes, needles, cannulas and IV sets, and food. It is emitted by a radioisotope, usually cobalt-60 (^{60}Co) or caesium-137 (^{137}Cs), which have photon energies of up to 1.3 and 0.66 MeV, respectively.

Use of a radioisotope requires shielding for the safety of the operators while in use and in storage. With most designs, the radioisotope is lowered into a water-filled source storage pool, which absorbs radiation and allows maintenance personnel to enter the radiation shield. One variant keeps the radioisotope under water at all times and lowers the product to be irradiated in the water in hermetically sealed bells; no further shielding is required for such designs. Other uncommonly used designs are dry storage, providing movable shields that reduce radiation levels in areas of the irradiation chamber, etc. An incident in Decatur, Georgia, USA, where water-soluble caesium-137 leaked into the source storage pool, required Nuclear Regulatory Commission (NRC) intervention and led to the use of this radioisotope being almost entirely discontinued in favor of the more costly, non-water-soluble cobalt-60. Cobalt-60 gamma photons have about twice the energy, and hence greater penetrating range, of caesium-137-produced radiation.

Electron beam processing is also commonly used for sterilization. Electron beams use an on-off technology and provide a much higher dosing rate than gamma or X-rays. Due to the higher dose rate, less exposure time is needed and thereby any potential degradation to polymers is reduced. Because electrons carry a charge, electron beams are less penetrating than both gamma and X-rays. Facilities rely on substantial concrete shields to protect workers and the environment from radiation exposure.

High-energy X-rays (produced by bremsstrahlung) allow irradiation of large packages and pallet loads of medical devices. They are sufficiently penetrating to treat multiple pallet loads of low-density packages with very good dose uniformity ratios. X-ray sterilization does not require chemical or radioactive material: high-energy X-rays are generated at high intensity by an X-ray generator that does not require shielding when not in use. X-rays are generated by bombarding a dense material (target) such as tantalum or tungsten with high-energy electrons, in a process known as bremsstrahlung conversion. These systems are energy-inefficient, requiring much more electrical energy than other systems for the same result.

Irradiation with X-rays, gamma rays, or electrons does not make materials radioactive, because the energy used is too low. Generally an energy of at least 10 MeV is needed to induce radioactivity in a material. Neutrons and very high-energy particles can make materials radioactive, but have good penetration, whereas lower energy particles (other than neutrons) cannot make materials radioactive, but have poorer penetration.

Sterilization by irradiation with gamma rays may however affect material properties.

Irradiation is used by the United States Postal Service to sterilize mail in the Washington, D.C. area. Some foods (e.g., spices and ground meats) are sterilized by irradiation.

Subatomic particles may be more or less penetrating and may be generated by a radioisotope or a device, depending upon the type of particle.

== Sterile filtration ==
Fluids that would be damaged by heat, irradiation, or chemical sterilization, such as drug solution, can be sterilized by microfiltration using membrane filters. This method is commonly used for heat labile pharmaceuticals and protein solutions in medicinal drug processing. A microfilter with pore size of usually 0.22 μm will effectively remove microorganisms. Some Staphylococcal species have, however, been shown to be flexible enough to pass through 0.22 μm filters. In the processing of biologics, viruses must be removed or inactivated, requiring the use of nanofilters with a smaller pore size (20–50 nm). Smaller pore sizes lower the flow rate, so in order to achieve higher total throughput or to avoid premature blockage, pre-filters might be used to protect small pore membrane filters. Tangential flow filtration (TFF) and alternating tangential flow (ATF) systems also reduce particulate accumulation and blockage.

Membrane filters used in production processes are commonly made from materials such as mixed cellulose ester or polyethersulfone (PES). The filtration equipment and the filters themselves may be purchased as pre-sterilized disposable units in sealed packaging or must be sterilized by the user, generally by autoclaving at a temperature that does not damage the fragile filter membranes. To ensure proper functioning of the filter, the membrane filters are integrity tested post-use and sometimes before use. The nondestructive integrity test assures that the filter is undamaged and is a regulatory requirement. Typically, terminal pharmaceutical sterile filtration is performed inside of a cleanroom to prevent contamination.

== Preservation of sterility ==
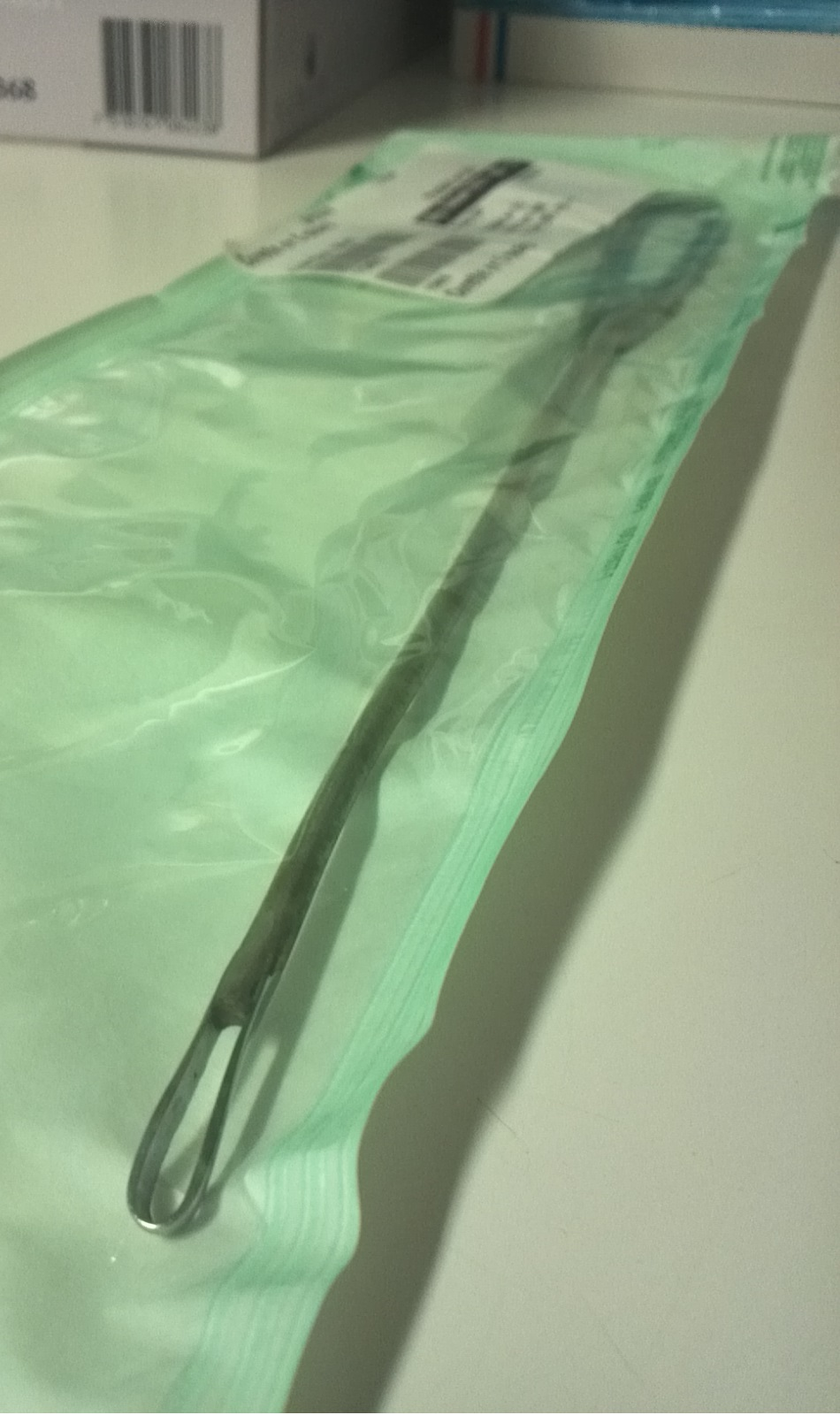
A curette in sterile packaging.

Instruments that have undergone sterilization can be maintained in such condition by containment in sealed packaging until use.

Aseptic technique is the act of maintaining sterility during procedures.

== See also ==
- Antibacterial soap
- Asepsis
- Aseptic processing
- Contamination control
- Electron irradiation
- Food packaging
- Food preservation
- Food safety
- Spaulding classification
- Sterilant gas monitoring

== Sources ==
- WHO - Infection Control Guidelines for Transmissible Spongiform Encephalopathies. Retrieved Jul 10, 2010
- Ninemeier J. Central Service Technical Manual (6th ed.). International Association of Healthcare Central Service Materiel Management. Archived from the original on 2020-08-07.
- Control of microbes
- Raju GK, Cooney CL (1993). "Media and air sterilization". In Stephanopoulos G (ed.). Biotechnology, 2E, Vol. 3, Bioprocessing. Weinheim: Wiley-VCH. pp. 157–84. ISBN 3-527-28313-7.
- Innovative Technologies for the Biofunctionalisation and Terminal Sterilisation of Medical Devices
- Sterilization of liquids, solids, waste in disposal bags and hazardous biological substances
- Pharmaceutical Filtration - The Management of Organism Removal, Meltzer TH, Jornitz MW, PDA/DHI 1998
- "Association for Advancement of Medical Instrumentation ANSI/AAMI ST41-Ehylene Oxyde Sterilization in Healthcare facilities: Safety and Effectiveness. Arlington, VA: Association for Advancement of Medical Instrumentation; 2000." ISBN 1-57020-420-9
- "US Department of Labor, Occupational Safety and Health Administration.29 CFR 1910.1020. Access to Employee Medical Records.". October 26, 2007.
- Perioperative Standards and Recommended Practices, AORN 2013, ISBN 978-1-888460-77-3
