= Quarantine =

Epidemiological intervention to prevent disease transmission

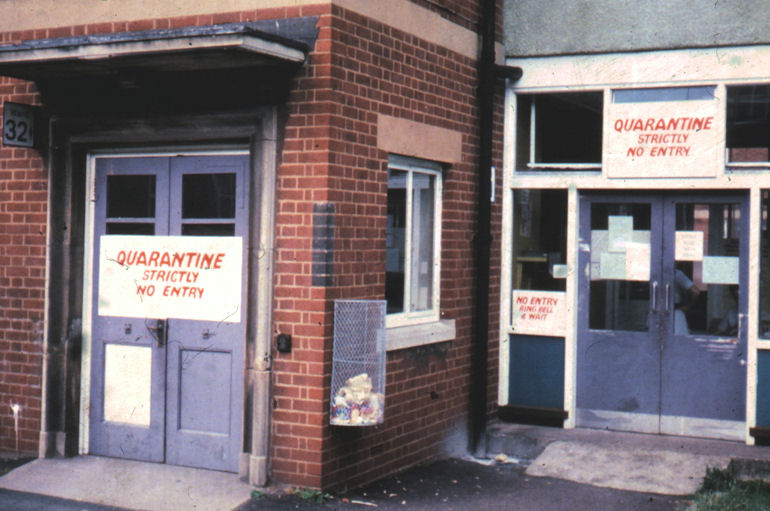
A quarantine was imposed on parts of East Birmingham Hospital after a 1978 smallpox outbreak.

A quarantine is a restriction on the movement of people, animals, and goods which is intended to prevent the spread of disease or pests. It is often used in connection to disease and illness, preventing the movement of those who may have been exposed to a communicable disease, yet do not have a confirmed medical diagnosis. It is distinct from medical isolation, in which those confirmed to be infected with a communicable disease are separated, or isolated, from the healthy population.

The concept of quarantine is known to have been practiced around the world throughout history. Notable quarantines in modern history include the village of Eyam in 1665 during the bubonic plague outbreak in England; East Samoa during the 1918 flu pandemic; the Diphtheria outbreak during the 1925 serum run to Nome, the 1972 Yugoslav smallpox outbreak, the 2002–2004 SARS outbreak, the 2013–2016 Western African Ebola epidemic, and extensive quarantines throughout the world during the COVID-19 pandemic.

Ethical and practical considerations must be contemplated in the application of quarantine to people. Practice differs from country to country, as different countries vest the authority to quarantine their citizens and other persons under a variety of scenarios at different levels of government, with wide variation in quarantine enforcement mechanisms.

In some countries, quarantine is just one of many measures governed by legislation relating to the broader concept of biosecurity. For example, Australian biosecurity is mostly governed by the single overarching Biosecurity Act 2015. However, that is not the only Australian law focusing on quarantine; Section 107 of the Constitution preserves states' broad residual legislative powers, including public health powers, and Section 51(ix) gives the Commonwealth power to legislate with respect to quarantine—that power is generally concurrent rather than exclusive. As a result, both the Commonwealth and the states can enact quarantine laws, with Commonwealth law prevailing in cases of inconsistency.

== Etymology and terminology ==
The word quarantine comes from quarantena or quarantaine, meaning "forty days", used in the Venetian language in the 14th and 15th centuries and also in France. The word is designated in the period during which all ships were required to be isolated before passengers and crew could go ashore during the Black Death plague. The quarantena followed the trentino, or "thirty-day isolation" period, first imposed in 1377 in the Republic of Ragusa, Dalmatia (modern Dubrovnik in Croatia).

Merriam-Webster gives various meanings to the noun form, including "a period of 40 days", several relating to ships, "a state of enforced isolation", and as "a restriction on the movement of people and goods which is intended to prevent the spread of disease or pests". The word is also used as a verb.

Quarantine is distinct from medical isolation, in which those confirmed to be infected with a communicable disease are isolated from the healthy population.

Quarantine may be used interchangeably with cordon sanitaire, and although the terms are related, cordon sanitaire refers to the restriction of movement of people into or out of a defined geographic area, such as a community, in order to prevent an infection from spreading.

== History ==
An early mention of isolation occurs in the Biblical book of Leviticus, written in the seventh century BC or perhaps earlier, which describes the procedure for separating out infected people to prevent spread of disease under the Mosaic Law:

"If the shiny spot on the skin is white but does not appear to be more than skin deep and the hair in it has not turned white, the priest is to isolate the affected person for seven days. On the seventh day the priest is to examine him, and if he sees that the sore is unchanged and has not spread in the skin, he is to isolate him for another seven days."

=== Medieval ===
The mandatory quarantine of special groups of patients, including those with leprosy, started early in Islamic history. A hadith going back to the Islamic prophet Muhammad advised individuals present in a region with a plague outbreak to remain in place, and advised healthy individuals to avoid travelling there.

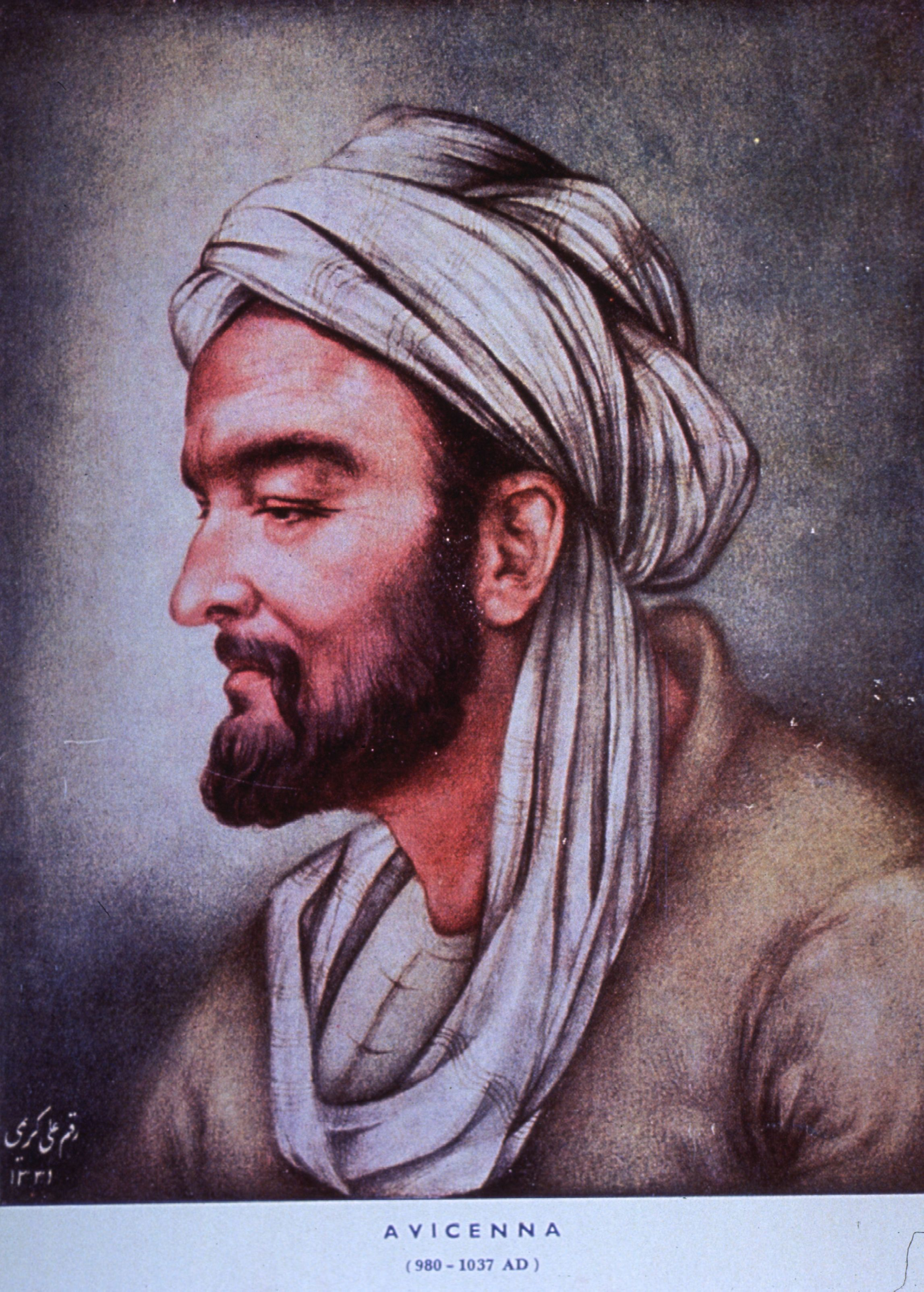
Ibn Sina (Avicenna), one of the earliest physicians to propose systematic isolation and quarantine procedures to limit the spread of infectious diseases in his medical treatises.

in 1025, Persian Muslim polymath Ibn Sina (Avicenna) proposed a systematic and scientific formalization of quarantine in his medical encyclopedia, The Canon of Medicine. He established the clinical necessity of isolation to prevent "the spread of diseases," fundamentally shifting the practice from a traditional custom to a rigorous medical protocol. He also recommended quarantine for patients with infectious diseases, especially tuberculosis. In the early 8th century the sixth Umayyad caliph Al-Walid I segregated lepers from the general population, with some later sources crediting the caliph with opening a hospital. The separation of lepers from the general population was also practiced in the Moroccan city of Fez, where lepers were relocated to a cave system outside of the city. Dedicated leprosariums were built in the time of the Ottoman sultan Murad II in the 15th century, with some of the facilities operating for centuries. Since the sixteenth century, the Ottoman Empire has isolated travellers coming from epidemic areas during the Bubonic plague. A quarantine involved isolating healthy travellers for a period of time so that it could be ascertained if they were sick or not.

The word "quarantine" originates from quarantena, the Venetian language form, meaning "forty days". This is due to the 40-day isolation of ships and people practised as a measure of disease prevention related to the plague. Between 1348 and 1359, the Black Death wiped out an estimated 30% of Europe's population, and a significant percentage of Asia's population. Such a disaster led governments to establish measures of containment to handle recurrent epidemics. A document from 1377 states that before entering the city-state of Ragusa in Dalmatia (modern Dubrovnik in Croatia), newcomers had to spend 30 days (a trentine) in a restricted place (originally nearby islands) waiting to see whether the symptoms of Black Death would develop. In 1448 the Venetian Senate prolonged the waiting period to 40 days, thus giving birth to the term "quarantine". The forty-day quarantine proved to be an effective formula for handling outbreaks of the plague. Dubrovnik was the first city in Europe to set up quarantine sites such as the Lazzarettos of Dubrovnik where arriving ship personnel were held for up to 40 days. According to estimates, the bubonic plague had a 37-day period from infection to death. Therefore, the European quarantines would have been highly successful in determining the health of crews from potential trading and supply ships.

Other diseases lent themselves to the practice of quarantine before and after the devastation of the plague. Those affected by leprosy were historically isolated long-term from society. Quarantine systems were enacted to prevent the spread of syphilis in Zurich in the 15th and 16th centuries, the advent of yellow fever in Spain at the beginning of the 19th century, and the arrival of Asiatic cholera in 1831.

Venice took the lead in measures to check the spread of plague, having appointed three guardians of public health in the first years of the Black Death (1348). The next record of preventive measures comes from Reggio/Modena in 1374. Venice founded the first lazaret (on a small island adjoining the city) in 1403. In 1467 Genoa followed the example of Venice, and in 1476 the old leper hospital of Marseille was converted into a plague hospital. The great lazaret of Marseille, perhaps the most complete of its kind, was founded in 1526 on the island of Pomègues. The practise at all the Mediterranean lazarets did not differ from the English procedure in the Levantine and North African trade. On the arrival of cholera in 1831 some new lazarets were set up at western ports; notably, a very extensive establishment near Bordeaux. Afterwards, they were used for other purposes.

=== Modern history ===
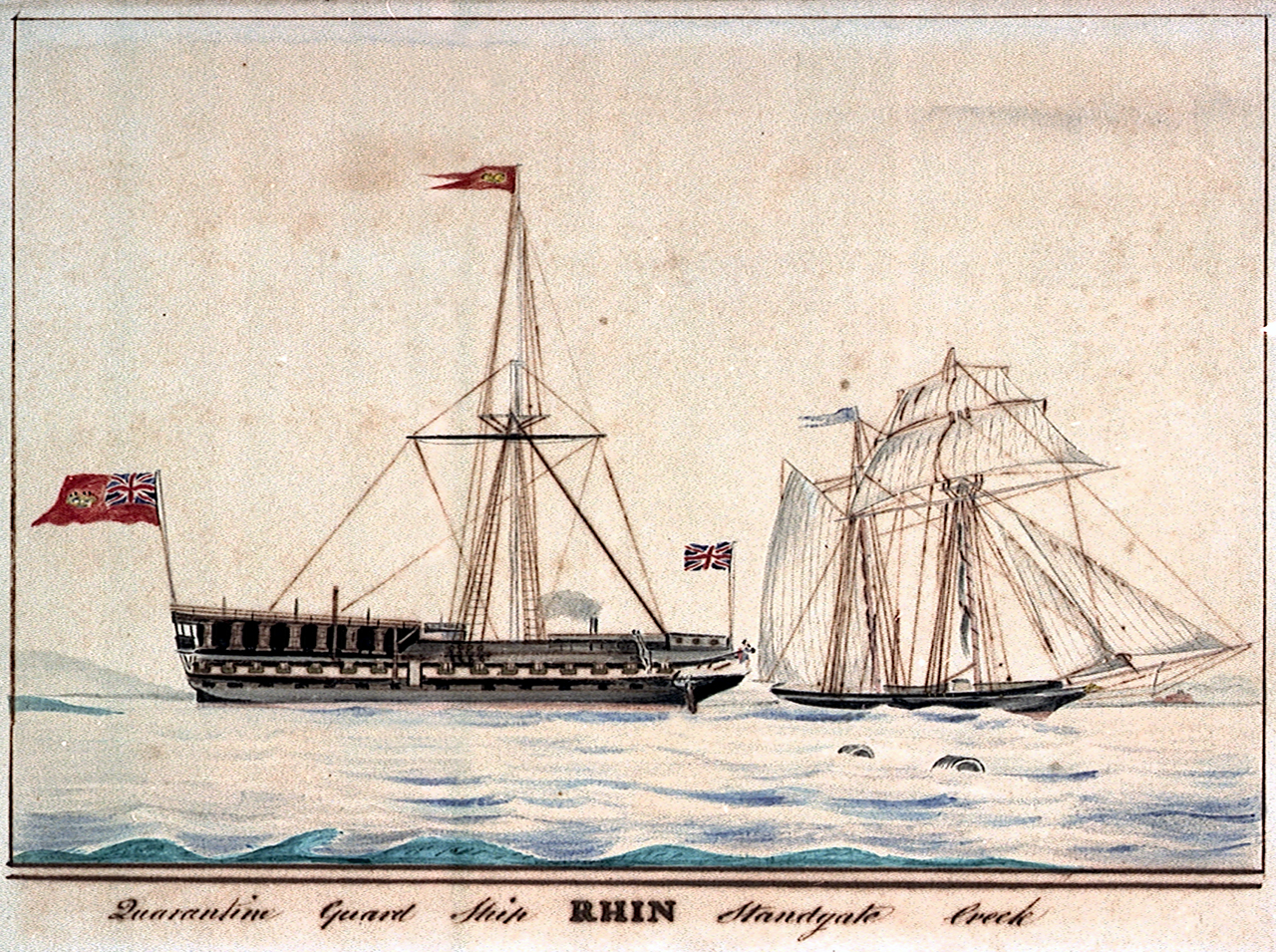
19th-century illustration of the British quarantine ship HMS Rhin of Sheerness

Epidemics of yellow fever ravaged urban communities in North America throughout the late-eighteenth and early-nineteenth centuries, the best-known examples being the 1793 Philadelphia yellow fever epidemic and outbreaks in Georgia (1856) and Florida (1888). Cholera and smallpox epidemics continued throughout the nineteenth century, and plague epidemics affected Honolulu and San Francisco from 1899 until 1901. State governments generally relied on the cordon sanitaire as a geographic quarantine measure to control the movement of people into and out of affected communities. During the 1918 influenza pandemic, some communities instituted protective sequestration (sometimes referred to as "reverse quarantine") to keep the infected from introducing influenza into healthy populations. Additionally, the nature of the influenza virus that caused the 1918 pandemic gave rise to a public awareness of the dichotomy between "crowd" and "home" diseases. Simply quarantining the sick in isolation was ineffective in halting the spread of the disease, and new quarantine standards that extended regulations to public spaces became increasingly more common. Most Western countries implemented a range of containment strategies, including isolation, surveillance, and the closure of schools, churches, theatres, and public events.

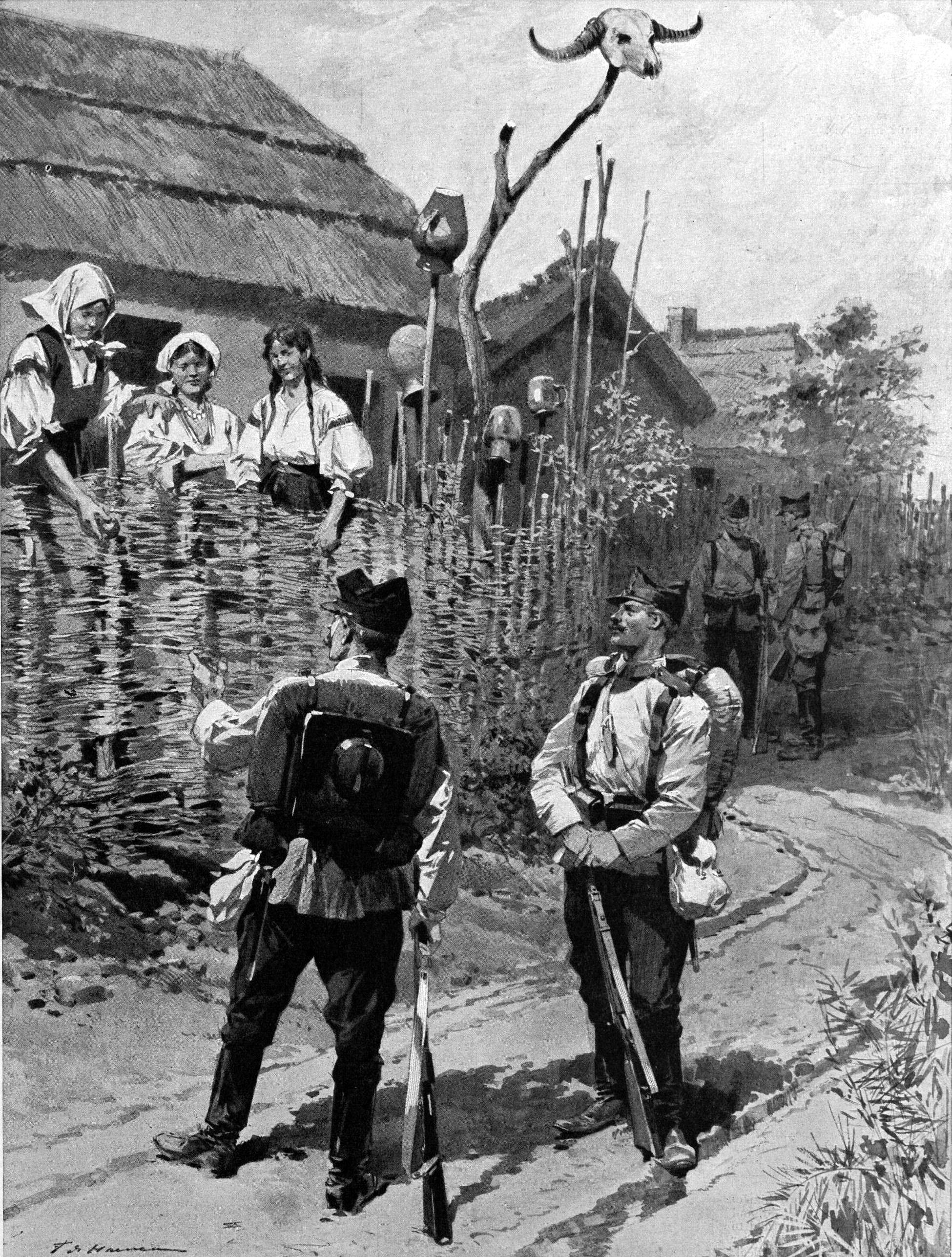
Isolating a village in Romania whose inhabitants believe that doctors poison those suspected of cholera (1911)

People were prevented from entering the Ashanti Empire at border checkpoints if they exhibited symptoms of smallpox. Those who discovered symptoms of the disease after entering Ashanti were quarantined in remote villages. In the 1830s, both the Ottoman Empire and Egypt established new quarantine systems. In 1831, Mehmet Ali of Egypt founded the Quarantine Board in Alexandria. In 1838, the Ottoman government installed the Supreme Council of Health, including the Quarantine Administration, in Istanbul. These two institutions set up permanent quarantines throughout the eastern Mediterranean, based on the western Mediterranean quarantine model. For example, at the port of İzmir, all ships and their cargo would be inspected and those suspected of carrying the plague would be towed to separate docks and their personnel housed in separate buildings for a determined period of time. In Thessaly, along the Greek-Turkish border, all travellers entering and exiting the Ottoman Empire would be quarantined for 9–15 days. Upon appearance of the plague, the quarantine stations would be militarised and the Ottoman army would be involved in border control and disease monitoring.

==== International conventions 1852–1927 ====
Since 1852, several conferences were held involving European powers, with a view to uniform action in keeping out infection from the East and preventing its spread within Europe. All but that of 1897 were concerned with cholera. No result came of those at Paris (1852), Constantinople (1866), Vienna (1874), and Rome (1885), but each of the subsequent ones doctrine of constructive infection of a ship as coming from a scheduled port, and an approximation to the principles advocated by the United Kingdom for many years. The principal countries which retained the old system at the time were Spain, Portugal, Turkey, Greece, and Russia (the British possessions at the time, Gibraltar, Malta, and Cyprus, being under the same influence). The aim of each international sanitary convention had been to bind the governments to a uniform minimum of preventive action, with further restrictions permissible to individual countries. The minimum specified by international conventions was very nearly the same as the British practice, which had been in turn adapted to continental opinion in the matter of the importation of rags.

The Venice convention of 30 January 1892 dealt with cholera by the Suez Canal route; that of Dresden of 15 April 1893, with cholera within European countries; that of Paris of 3 April 1894, with cholera by the pilgrim traffic; and that of Venice, on 19 March 1897, was in connection with the outbreak of plague in the East, and the conference met to settle on an international basis the steps to be taken to prevent, if possible, its spread into Europe. An additional convention was signed in Paris on 3 December 1903.

A multilateral international sanitary convention was concluded at Paris on 17 January 1912. This convention was most comprehensive and was designated to replace all previous conventions on that matter. It was signed by 40 countries, and consisted of 160 articles. Ratifications by 16 of the signatories were exchanged in Paris on 7 October 1920. Another multilateral convention was signed in Paris on 21 June 1926, to replace that of 1912. It was signed by 58 countries worldwide, and consisted of 172 articles.

In Latin America, a series of regional sanitary conventions were concluded. Such a convention was concluded in Rio de Janeiro on 12 June 1904. A sanitary convention between the governments of Argentina, Brazil, Paraguay, and Uruguay was concluded in Montevideo on 21 April 1914. The convention covers cases of Asiatic cholera, oriental plague and yellow fever. It was ratified by the Uruguayan government on 13 October 1914, by the Paraguayan government on 27 September 1917 and by the Brazilian government on 18 January 1921.

Sanitary conventions were also concluded between European states. A Soviet-Latvian sanitary convention was signed on 24 June 1922, for which ratifications were exchanged on 18 October 1923. A bilateral sanitary convention was concluded between the governments of Latvia and Poland on 7 July 1922, for which ratifications were exchanged on 7 April 1925. Another was concluded between the governments of Germany and Poland in Dresden on 18 December 1922, and entered into effect on 15 February 1923. Another one was signed between the governments of Poland and Romania on 20 December 1922. Ratifications were exchanged on 11 July 1923. The Polish government also concluded such a convention with the Soviet government on 7 February 1923, for which ratifications were exchanged on 8 January 1924. A sanitary convention was also concluded between the governments of Poland and Czechoslovakia on 5 September 1925, for which ratifications were exchanged on 22 October 1926. A convention was signed between the governments of Germany and Latvia on 9 July 1926, for which ratifications were exchanged on 6 July 1927.

In 1897, the incubation period for this disease was determined and this was to be adopted for administrative purposes. The incubation period was comparatively short, some three or four days. After much discussion ten days was accepted by a majority. The principle of disease notification was unanimously adopted. Each government had to notify other governments of the existence of plague within their jurisdictions and state the measures of prevention being carried out to prevent its spread. The area declared infected was limited to the district or village where the disease prevailed, and no locality was deemed to be infected because of the importation into it of a few cases of plague while there has been no spread. It was decided during the prevalence of plague, every country had the right to close its land borders to traffic. At the Red Sea, it was decided after discussion a healthy vessel could pass through the Suez Canal and continue its voyage in the Mediterranean during the incubation period of the disease and that vessels passing through the Canal in quarantine might, subject to the use of the electric light, coal up in quarantine at Port Said by night or by day, and that passengers might embark in quarantine at that port. Infected vessels, if these carry a doctor and a disinfecting stove, have a right to navigate the Canal in quarantine and subject only to the landing of those who have plague.

In the 20th and 21st centuries, people suspected of carrying infectious diseases have been quarantined, as in the cases of Andrew Speaker (multi-drug-resistant tuberculosis, 2007) and Kaci Hickox (Ebola, 2014). During the 1957–58 influenza pandemic and the 1968 flu pandemic, several countries implemented measures to control spread of the disease. In addition, the World Health Organization applied a global influenza surveillance network.

During the 1994 plague in India, many people were quarantined. Vessels and aircraft carrying passengers were fumigated.

In the SARS epidemic, thousands of Chinese people were quarantined and checkpoints to take temperatures were set up.

Moving infected patients to isolation wards and home-based self-quarantine of people potentially exposed was the main way the Western African Ebola virus epidemic was ended in 2016; members of the 8th WHO Emergency Committee criticised international travel restrictions imposed during the epidemic as ineffective due to difficulty of enforcement, and counterproductive as they slowed down aid efforts.

The People's Republic of China has employed mass quarantines – firstly of the city of Wuhan and subsequently of all of the Hubei province (population 55.5 million) – in the COVID-19 pandemic. After a few weeks, the Italian government imposed lockdowns for the entire country (more than 60 million people) in an attempt to stop the spread of the disease there. India quarantined itself from the world for a period of one month. Most governments around the world restricted or advised against all non-essential travel to and from countries and areas affected by the outbreak. By late 2020, the virus had already spread within communities in large parts of the world, with many not knowing where or how they were infected.

== Signals and flags ==
The signal flag "Quebec", also called the "Yellow Jack", is a yellow flag that was historically used to signal quarantine (it stands for Q), but in modern use indicates the opposite, as a signal of a ship free of disease which requests boarding and inspection.

Plain yellow, green, and even black flags have been used to symbolise disease in both ships and ports, with the colour yellow having a longer historical precedent, as a colour of marking for houses of infection, previous to its use as a maritime marking colour for disease. The former flag used for the purpose was the "Lima" (L) flag, which is a mixture of yellow and black flags previously used. It is sometimes called the "yellow jack" but this was also a name for yellow fever, which probably derives its common name from the flag, not the colour of the victims (cholera ships also used a yellow flag). The plain yellow flag ("Quebec" or Q in international maritime signal flags) probably derives its letter symbol for its initial use in quarantine, but this flag in modern times indicates the opposite—a ship that 'requests free pratique', i.e. that declares itself free of quarantinable disease, and requests boarding and routine port inspection.

Ships in quarantine today would fly either the Q flag alone, meaning "My vessel is 'healthy' and I request free pratique", or the double Q flag (QQ), meaning "I require health clearance".

== Ethical and practical considerations ==
The quarantining of people often raises questions of civil rights, especially in cases of long confinement or segregation from society, such as that of Mary Mallon (also known as Typhoid Mary), a typhoid fever carrier who was arrested and quarantined in 1907 and later spent the last 23 years and 7 months of her life in medical isolation at Riverside Hospital on North Brother Island.

=== The United Nations and the Siracusa Principles ===
Guidance on when and how human rights can be restricted to prevent the spread of infectious disease is found in the Siracusa Principles, a non-binding document developed by the Siracusa International Institute for Criminal Justice and Human Rights and adopted by the United Nations Economic and Social Council in 1984. The Siracusa Principles state that restrictions on human rights under the International Covenant on Civil and Political Rights must meet standards of legality, evidence-based necessity, proportionality, and gradualism, noting that public health can be used as grounds for limiting certain rights if the state needs to take measures 'aimed at preventing disease or injury or providing care for the sick and injured.' Limitations on rights (such as quarantine) must be 'strictly necessary,' meaning that they must:

- respond to a pressing public or social need (health)
- proportionately pursue a legitimate aim (prevent the spread of infectious disease)
- be the least restrictive means required for achieving the purpose of the limitation
- be provided for and carried out in accordance with the law
- be neither arbitrary nor discriminatory
- only limit rights that are within the jurisdiction of the state seeking to impose the limitation.

In addition, when quarantine is imposed, public health ethics specify that:

- all restrictive actions must be well-supported by data and scientific evidence
- all information must be made available to the public
- all actions must be explained clearly to those whose rights are restricted and to the public
- all actions must be subject to regular review and reconsideration.

Finally, the state is ethically obligated to guarantee that:

- infected people will not be threatened or abused
- basic needs such as food, water, medical care, and preventive care will be provided
- communication with loved ones and with caretakers will be permitted
- constraints on freedom will be applied equally, regardless of social considerations
- patients will be compensated fairly for economic and material losses, including salary.

=== Psychological impact ===
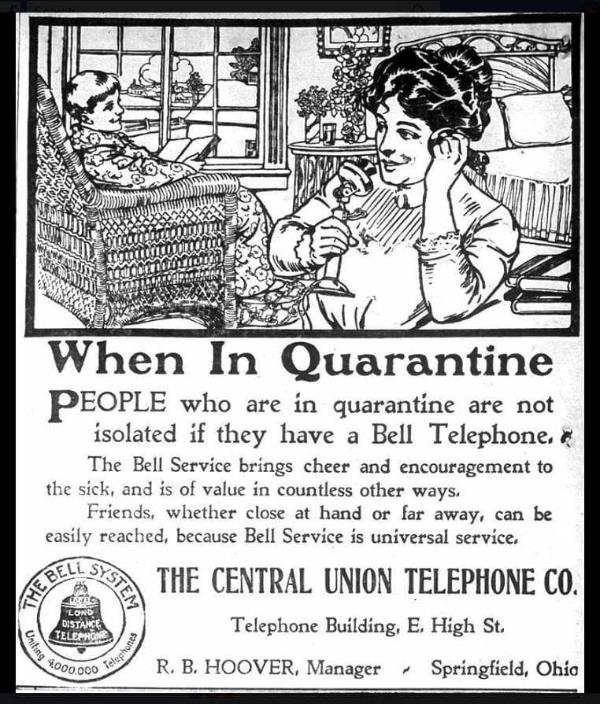
Bell Telephone advertisement, 1918

Quarantine can have adverse psychological effects on the quarantined, including post-traumatic stress, confusion, and anger. According to a "Rapid Review" published in The Lancet in response to the COVID-19 pandemic, "Stressors included longer quarantine duration, infection fears, frustration, boredom, inadequate supplies, inadequate information, financial loss, and stigma. Some researchers have suggested long-lasting effects. In situations where quarantine is deemed necessary, officials should quarantine individuals for no longer than required, provide clear rationale for quarantine and information about protocols, and ensure sufficient supplies are provided. Appeals to altruism by reminding the public about the benefits of quarantine to wider society can be favourable." Although youngsters appear to be less vulnerable to COVID-19, the side effects of the pandemic can be devastating. Quarantine from the pandemic led to an increase the prevalence of violence in the family, depression, anxiety, and post-traumatic stress disorder. Children and adolescents may be highly exposed to biopsychosocial stressors generated by the pandemic and once population's containment measures to reduce virus spread are required, they could be potentially affected by the disruption in daily life routine as a result of social isolation and their unseasoned ability to conceive and comprehend the short- and long-term consequences of this outbreak.

=== Short-term quarantines, e.g. for decontamination ===
Quarantine periods can be very short, such as in the case of a suspected anthrax attack, in which people are allowed to leave as soon as they shed their potentially contaminated garments and undergo a decontamination shower. For example, an article entitled "Daily News workers quarantined" describes a brief quarantine that lasted until people could be showered in a decontamination tent.

The February–March 2003 issue of HazMat Magazine suggests that people be "locked in a room until proper decon could be performed", in the event of "suspect anthrax".

Standard-Times senior correspondent Steve Urbon (14 February 2003) describes such temporary quarantine powers:

Civil rights activists in some cases have objected to people being rounded up, stripped and showered against their will. But Capt. Chmiel said local health authorities have "certain powers to quarantine people".

The purpose of such quarantine-for-decontamination is to prevent the spread of contamination and to contain the contamination such that others are not put at risk from a person fleeing a scene where contamination is suspect. It can also be used to limit exposure, as well as eliminate a vector.

New developments for quarantine include new concepts in quarantine vehicles such as the ambulance bus, mobile hospitals, and lockdown/invacuation (inverse evacuation) procedures, as well as docking stations for an ambulance bus to dock to a facility under lockdown.

== Standard quarantine practices in different countries ==
=== Australia ===
Biosecurity in Australia is governed by the Biosecurity Act 2015. The Department of Agriculture, Water and the Environment (DAWE) is responsible for border inspection of products brought into Australia, and assesses the risks the products might harm Australian environment. No person, goods, and vessels are permitted into Australia without clearance from DAFF. Visitors are required to fill in the information card on arriving in Australia. Besides other risk factors, visitors are required to declare what food and products made of wood and other natural materials they have. Visitors who fail to do so may be subject to a fine of A$444, or may face criminal prosecution and be fined up to A$444,000 or imprisonment of up to 10 years.

Australia has very strict quarantine standards. Quarantine in northern Australia is especially important because of its proximity to South-East Asia and the Pacific, which have many pests and diseases not present in Australia. For this reason, the region from Cairns to Broome—including the Torres Strait—is the focus for quarantine activities that protect all Australians. As Australia has been geographically isolated from other major continents for millions of years, there is an endemically unique ecosystem free of several severe pests and diseases that are present in many parts of the world. If other products are brought inside along with pests and diseases, it would damage the ecosystem seriously and add millions of costs in the local agricultural businesses.

=== Canada ===
There are three quarantine Acts of Parliament in Canada: Quarantine Act (humans), Health of Animals Act (animals), and Plant Protection Act (vegetations). The first legislation is enforced by the Canada Border Services Agency after a complete rewrite in 2005. The second and third legislations are enforced by the Canadian Food Inspection Agency. If a health emergency exists, the Governor in Council can prohibit importation of anything that it deems necessary under the Quarantine Act.

Under the Quarantine Act, all travellers must submit to screening and if they believe they might have come into contact with communicable diseases or vectors, they must disclose their whereabouts to a Border Services Officer. If the officer has reasonable grounds to believe that the traveller is or might have been infected with a communicable disease or refused to provide answers, a quarantine officer (QO) must be called and the person is to be isolated. If a person refuses to be isolated, any peace officer may arrest without warrant.

A QO who has reasonable grounds to believe that the traveller has or might have a communicable disease or is infested with vectors, after the medical examination of a traveller, can order him/her into treatment or measures to prevent the person from spreading the disease. QO can detain any traveller who refuses to comply with his/her orders or undergo health assessments as required by law.

Under the Health of Animals Act and Plant Protection Act, inspectors can prohibit access to an infected area, dispose or treat any infected or thought to be infected animals or plants. The Minister can order for compensation to be given if animals/plants were destroyed pursuant to these acts.

Each province also enacts its own quarantine/environmental health legislation.

=== Hong Kong ===
Under the Prevention and Control of Disease Ordinance (HK Laws. Chap 599), a health officer may seize articles they believe to be infectious or containing infectious agents. All travellers, if requested, must submit themselves to a health officer. Failure to do so is against the law and is subject to arrest and prosecution.

The law allows for health officers who have reasonable grounds to detain, isolate, quarantine anyone or anything believed to be infected, and to restrict any articles from leaving a designated quarantine area. He/she may also order the Civil Aviation Department to prohibit the landing or leaving, embarking or disembarking of an aircraft. This power also extends to land, sea or air crossings.

Under the same ordinance, any police officer, health officer, member of the Civil Aid Service, or member of the Auxiliary Medical Service can arrest a person who obstructs or escapes from detention.

=== United Kingdom ===
To reduce the risk of introducing rabies from continental Europe, the United Kingdom required from 1897 to 2000 that dogs, and most other animals introduced to the country, spend six months in quarantine at an HM Customs and Excise pound; this policy was abolished in 2000 in favour of a scheme generally known as Pet Passports, where animals can avoid quarantine if they have documentation showing they are up to date on their appropriate vaccinations.

==== British maritime quarantine rules 1711–1896 ====
Quarantine Act 1710
- Act of Parliament
- Parliament of Great Britain
- Long title: An Act to oblige Ships, coming from Places infected, more effectually to perform their Quarentine.
- Citation: 9 Ann. c. 2
- Territorial extent: Great Britain

Dates
- Royal assent: 23 December 1710
- Commencement: 25 December 1710 (Note: Section 2.)
- Repealed: 15 July 1867
Other legislation
Amended by	Quarantine Act 1720
Repealed by	Statute Law Revision Act 1867
Relates to	Quarantine Act 1721; Levant Trade Act 1752; Quarantine and Customs Act 1788

Status: Repealed

Text of statute as originally enacted

The plague had disappeared from England for more than thirty years before the practice of quarantine against it was definitely established by the Quarantine Act 1710 (9 Ann. c. 2). The first act was called for due to fears that the plague might be imported from Poland and the Baltic region. A second act of Parliament, the Quarantine Act 1721 (8 Geo. 1. c. 10), was due to the prevalence of plague at Marseille and other places in Provence, France. It was renewed in 1733 after a new outbreak in continental Europe, and again in 1743, due to an epidemic in Messina. A rigorous quarantine clause was introduced into the Levant Trade Act 1752, an act regulating trade with the Levant, and various arbitrary orders were issued during the next twenty years to meet the supposed danger of infection from the Baltic region. Although no plague cases ever came to England during that period, the restrictions on traffic became more stringent, and in 1788 a very strict Quarantine and Customs Act 1788 (28 Geo. 3. c. 34) was passed, with provisions affecting cargoes in particular. The act was revised in 1801 and 1805, and in 1823–24 an elaborate inquiry was followed by an act of Parliament making quarantine only at discretion of the privy council, which recognised yellow fever or other highly infectious diseases as calling for quarantine, along with plague. The threat of cholera in 1831 was the last occasion in England of the use of quarantine restrictions. Cholera affected every country in Europe, despite all efforts to keep it out. When cholera returned to England in 1849, 1853 and 1865–66, no attempt was made to seal the ports. In 1847 the privy council ordered all arrivals with a clean bill of health from the Black Sea and the Levant to be admitted, provided there had been no case of plague during the voyage, and afterwards the practice of quarantine was discontinued.

After the passing of the Quarantine Act 1710 the protective practices in England were haphazard and arbitrary. In 1721 two vessels carrying cotton goods from Cyprus, then affected by the plague, were ordered to be burned with their cargoes, the owners receiving an indemnity. By the clause in the Levant Trade Act 1752, ships arriving in the United Kingdom with a "foul bill" (i.e. coming from a country where plague existed) had to return to the lazarets of Malta, Venice, Messina, Livorno, Genoa, or Marseille, to complete a quarantine or to have their cargoes opened and aired. Since 1741 Stangate Creek (on the Medway) had been the quarantine station but it was available only for vessels with clean bills of health. In 1755 lazarets in the form of floating hulks were established in England for the first time, the cleansing of cargo (particularly by exposure to dews) having been done previously on the ship's deck. No medical inspections were conducted, but control was the responsibility of the Officers of Royal Customs and quarantine. In 1780, when plague was in Poland, even vessels with grain from the Baltic region had to spend forty days in quarantine, and unpack and air their cargoes, but due to complaints mainly from Edinburgh and Leith, an exception was made for grain after that date. About 1788 an order of the council required every ship liable to quarantine to hoist a yellow flag in the daytime and show a light at the main topmast head at night, in case of meeting any vessel at sea, or upon arriving within four leagues of the coast of Great Britain or Ireland, the Channel Islands, or the Isle of Man.

After 1800, ships from plague-affected countries (or with foul bills) were permitted to complete their quarantine in the Medway instead of at a Mediterranean port on the way, and an extensive lazaret was built on Chetney Hill near Chatham (although it was later demolished). The use of floating hulks as lazarets continued as before. In 1800 two ships with hides from Mogador in Morocco were ordered to be sunk with their cargoes at the Nore, the owners receiving an indemnity. Animal hides were suspected of harbouring infections, along with a long list of other items, and these had to be exposed on the ship's deck for twenty-one days or less (six days for each instalment of the cargo), and then transported to the lazaret, where they were opened and aired for another forty days. The whole detention of the vessel was from sixty to sixty-five days, including the time for reshipment of her cargo. Pilots had to pass fifteen days on board a convalescent ship. From 1846 onwards the quarantine establishments in the United Kingdom were gradually reduced, while the last vestige of the British quarantine law was removed by the Public Health Act 1896, which repealed the Quarantine Act 1825 (with dependent clauses of other acts), and transferred from the privy council to the Local Government Board the powers to deal with ships arriving infected with yellow fever or plague. The powers to deal with cholera ships had been already transferred by the Public Health Act 1875.

British regulations of 9 November 1896 applied to yellow fever, plague and cholera. Officers of Her Majesty's Customs, as well as of Her Majesty's Coastguard and the Board of Trade (for signalling), were empowered to take the initial steps. They certified in writing the master of a supposedly infected ship, and detained the vessel provisionally for not more than twelve hours, giving notice meanwhile to the port sanitary authority. The medical officer of the port boarded the ship and examined every person in it. Every person found infected was taken to a hospital and quarantined under the orders of the medical officer, and the vessel remained under his orders. Every person suspected could be detained on board for 48 hours or removed to the hospital for a similar period. All others were free to land upon giving the addresses of their destinations to be sent to the respective local authorities, so that the dispersed passengers and crew could be kept individually under observation for a few days. The ship was then disinfected, dead bodies buried at sea, infected clothing, bedding, etc., destroyed or disinfected, and bilge-water and water-ballast pumped out at a suitable distance before the ship entered a dock or basin. Mail was subject to no detention. A stricken ship within 3 miles of the shore had to fly a yellow and black flag at the main mast from sunrise to sunset.

=== United States ===
In the United States, authority to quarantine people with infectious diseases is split between the state and federal governments. States (and tribal governments recognized by the federal government) have primary authority to quarantine people within their boundaries. Federal jurisdiction only applies to people moving across state or national borders, or people on federal property and for certain diseases. For states, this quarantine power is vested by the Tenth Amendment, while the federal powers are rooted in Title 42 of the US Code.

==== Federal rules ====
Communicable diseases for which apprehension, detention, or conditional release of people are authorised must be specified in Executive Orders of the President. As of 2014, these include Executive Orders 13295 13375, and 13674; the latest executive order specifies the following infectious diseases: cholera, diphtheria, infectious tuberculosis, plague, smallpox, yellow fever, viral haemorrhagic fevers (Lassa, Marburg, Ebola, Crimean-Congo, South American, and others not yet isolated or named), severe acute respiratory syndromes (SARS), and influenza from a novel or re-emergent source.

The Department of Health and Human Services is responsible for quarantine decisions, specifically the Centers for Disease Control and Prevention's Division of Global Migration and Quarantine. As of 21 March 2017, Centers for Disease Control and Prevention (CDC) regulations specify:

- All commercial passenger flights must report deaths or illnesses to the CDC.
- Individuals must apply for a travel permit if they are under a Federal quarantine, isolation, or conditional release order.
- When an individual who is moving between U.S. states is "reasonably believed to be infected" with a quarantinable communicable disease in a "qualifying stage", the CDC may apprehend or examine that individual for potential infection.
- This includes new regulatory authority permitting the CDC Director to prohibit the importation of animals or products that pose a threat to public health.

The rules:

- Do not authorise compulsory medical testing, vaccination, or medical treatment without prior informed consent.
- Require CDC to advise individuals subject to medical examinations that they will be conducted by an authorised health worker and with prior informed consent.
- Include strong due process protections for individuals subject to public health orders, including a right to counsel for indigent individuals.
- Limit to 72 hours the amount of time that an individual may be apprehended pending the issuance of a federal order for isolation, quarantine, or conditional release.

==== American quarantine facilities ====
The Division of Global Migration Health (DGMH) of the US Centers for Disease Control (CDC) operates small quarantine facilities at a number of US ports of entry. As of 2014, these included one land crossing (in El Paso, Texas) and 19 international airports. (Note: The 19 airports with quarantine facilities are in Anchorage, Atlanta, Boston, Chicago, Dallas/Ft. Worth, Detroit, Honolulu, Houston, Los Angeles, Miami, Minneapolis, New York City (JFK), Newark, Philadelphia, San Diego, San Francisco, San Juan, Seattle, and Washington, D.C. (Dulles).)

Besides the port of entry where it is located, each station is also responsible for quarantining potentially infected travellers entering through any ports of entry in its assigned region. These facilities are fairly small; each one is operated by a few staff members and capable of accommodating 1–2 travellers for a short observation period. Cost estimates for setting up a temporary larger facility, capable of accommodating 100 to 200 travellers for several weeks, have been published by the Airport Cooperative Research Program (ACRP) in 2008 of the Transportation Research Board.

==== American quarantine of imported goods ====
The United States puts immediate quarantines on imported products if a contagious disease is identified and can be traced back to a certain shipment or product. All imports will also be quarantined if the disease appears in other countries. According to Title 42 U.S.C. §§264 and 266, these statutes provide the Secretary of Health and Human Services peacetime and wartime authority to control the movement of people into and within the United States to prevent the spread of communicable disease.

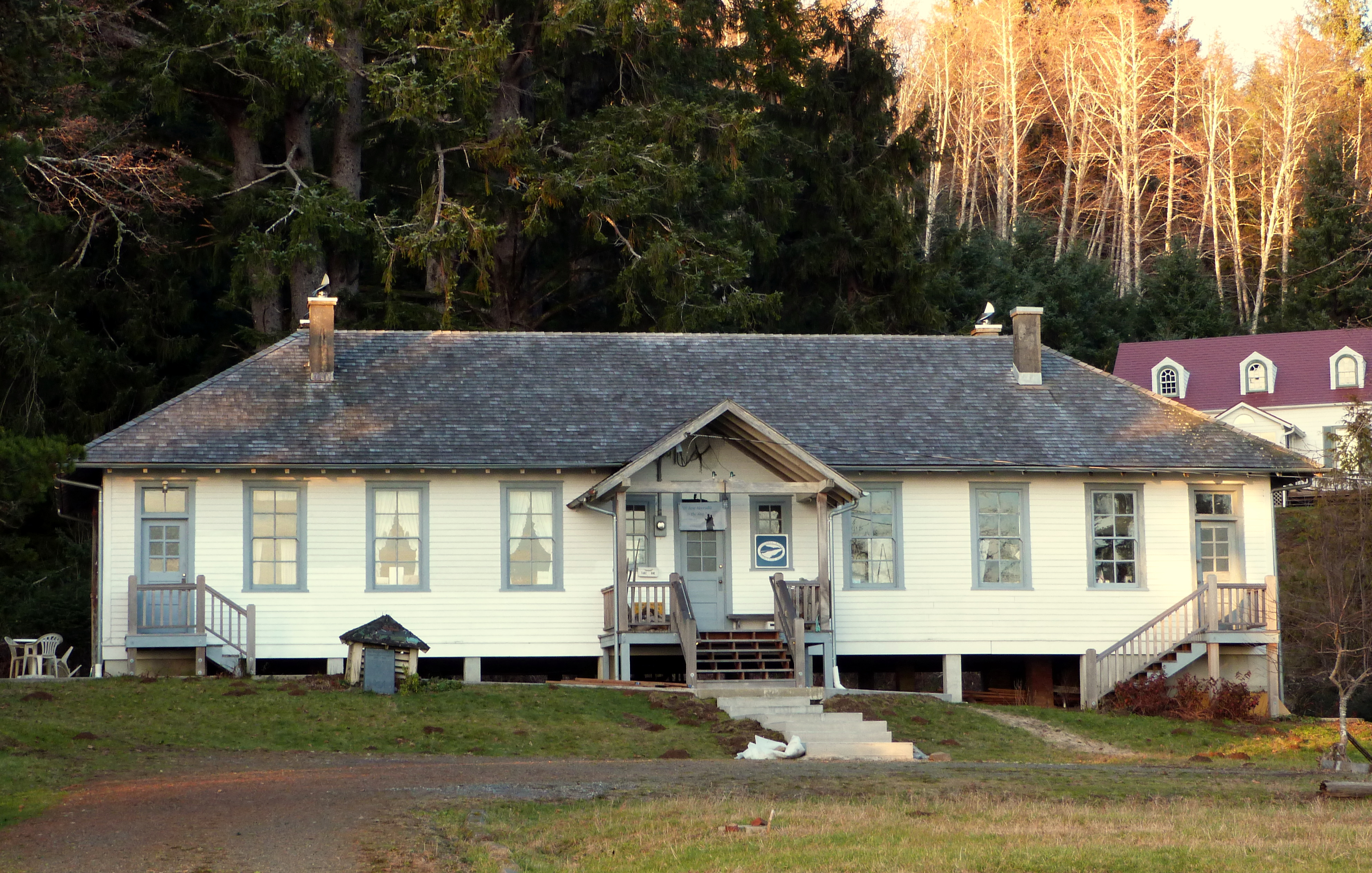
The quarantine hospital building (lazaretto) at the historic Columbia River Quarantine Station near Knappton, Washington

==== History of quarantine laws in the United States ====
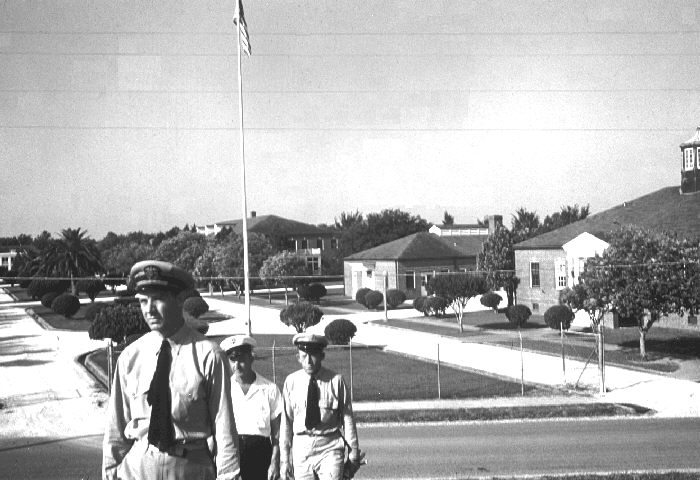
Public Health Service Quarantine Station, New Orleans, Louisiana, 1957

Quarantine law began in Colonial America in 1663, when in an attempt to curb an outbreak of smallpox, the city of New York established a quarantine. In the 1730s, the city built a quarantine station on the Bedloe's Island. The Philadelphia Lazaretto was the first quarantine hospital in the United States, built in 1799, in Tinicum Township, Delaware County, Pennsylvania. There are similar national landmarks such as the Columbia River Quarantine Station, Swinburne Island and Angel Island. The Pest House in Concord, Massachusetts was used as early as 1752 to quarantine those with cholera, tuberculosis and smallpox.

In early June 1832, during the cholera epidemic in New York, Governor Enos Throop called a special session of the Legislature for 21 June, to pass a Public Health Act by both Houses of the State Legislature. It included to a strict quarantine along the Upper and Lower New York-Canadian frontier. In addition, New York City Mayor Walter Browne established a quarantine against all peoples and products of Europe and Asia, which prohibited ships from approaching closer than 300 yards to the city, and all vehicles were ordered to stop 1.5 miles away.

The Immigrant Inspection Station on Ellis Island, built in 1892, is often mistakenly assumed to have been a quarantine station, however its marine hospital (Ellis Island Immigrant Hospital) only qualified as a contagious disease facility to handle less virulent diseases like measles, trachoma and less advanced stages of tuberculosis and diphtheria; those affected by smallpox, yellow fever, cholera, leprosy or typhoid fever, could neither be received nor treated there.

Mary Mallon was quarantined in 1907 under the Greater New York Charter, Sections 1169–1170, which permitted the New York City Board of Health to "remove to a proper place...any person sick with any contagious, pestilential or infectious disease."

During the 1918 flu pandemic, people were also quarantined. Most commonly suspect cases of infectious diseases are requested to voluntarily quarantine themselves, and Federal and local quarantine statutes only have been uncommonly invoked since then, including for a suspected smallpox case in 1963.

The 1944 Public Health Service Act "to apprehend, detain, and examine certain infected persons who are peculiarly likely to cause the interstate spread of disease" clearly established the federal government's quarantine authority for the first time. It gave the United States Public Health Service responsibility for preventing the introduction, transmission and spread of communicable diseases from foreign countries into the United States, and expanded quarantine authority to include incoming aircraft. The act states that "...any individual reasonably believed to be infected with a communicable disease in a qualifying stage and...if found to be infected, may be detained for such time and in such manner as may be reasonably necessary."

No federal quarantine orders were issued from 1963 until 2020, as American citizens were evacuated from China during the COVID-19 pandemic.

=== List of quarantine services in the world ===
- Australian Quarantine and Inspection Service
- MAF Quarantine Service, in the New Zealand
- Quarantine, Western Australia
- Samoa Quarantine Service, in the West Samoa
- Racehorse & Equine Quarantine Services, A company built & developed by Frankie Thevarasa Kuala Lumpur Malaysia
- Federal Service for Supervision of Consumer Rights Protection and Human Welfare, a Federal Quarantine Service of the Government of Russia.

== Notable quarantines ==
=== Eyam village, 1665 (plague) ===
Eyam was a village in Britain that imposed a cordon sanitaire on itself to stop the spread of the bubonic plague to other communities in 1665. The plague ran its course over 14 months and one account states that it killed at least 260 villagers. The church in Eyam has a record of 273 individuals who were victims of the plague.

=== Convict ship Surry, Sydney Harbour, 1814 (typhoid) ===
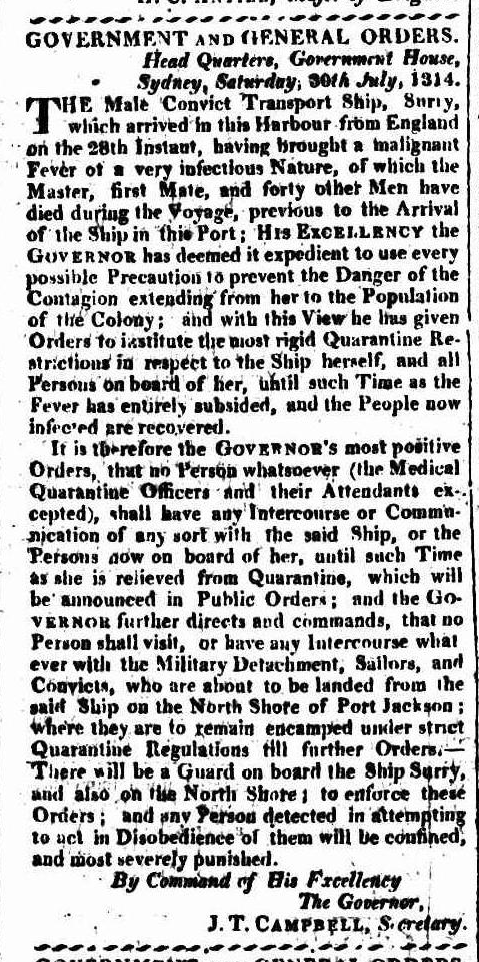
Quarantine of the convict ship Surry on the North Shore of Sydney Harbour in 1814, the first quarantine in Australia

On 28 July 1814, the convict ship Surry arrived in Sydney Harbour from England. Forty-six people had died of typhoid during the voyage, including 36 convicts, and the ship was placed in quarantine on the North Shore. Convicts were landed, and a camp was established in the immediate vicinity of what is now Jeffrey Street in Kirribilli. This was the first site in Australia to be used for quarantine purposes.

=== 'Typhoid Mary' (US), 1907–1910 and 1915–1938 ===
Mary Mallon was a cook who was found to be a carrier of Salmonella enterica subsp. enterica, the cause of typhoid fever, and was forcibly isolated from 1907 to 1910. At least 53 cases of the infection were traced to her, and three deaths. Subsequently, she spent a further 23 years in isolation prior to her death in 1938. The presence of the bacteria in her gallbladder was confirmed on autopsy.

=== East Samoa, 1918 (flu pandemic) ===
During the 1918 flu pandemic, the then Governor of American Samoa, John Martin Poyer, imposed a full protective sequestration of the islands from all incoming ships, successfully preventing influenza from infecting the population and thus achieving zero deaths within the territory. In contrast, the neighbouring New Zealand-controlled Western Samoa was among the hardest hit, with a 90% infection rate and over 20% of its adults dying from the disease. This failure by the New Zealand government to prevent and contain the Spanish Flu subsequently rekindled Samoan anti-colonial sentiments that led to its eventual independence.

=== Gruinard Island, 1942–1990 (anthrax) ===
In 1942, during World War II, British forces tested out their biological weapons program on Gruinard Island and infected it with anthrax. A quarantine order was subsequently placed on the island. The quarantine was lifted in 1990, when the island was declared safe, and a flock of sheep was released onto the island.

=== Apollo series space explorers, 1969–1971 ===
Between 24 July 1969 and 9 February 1971, the astronauts of Apollo 11, Apollo 12, and Apollo 14, were quarantined (in each case for a total of 21 days) after returning to Earth, initially where they were recovered, and then were transferred to the Lunar Receiving Laboratory, to prevent possible interplanetary contamination by microorganisms from the Moon. All lunar samples were also held in the biosecure environment of the Lunar Receiving Laboratory for initial assay.

=== Yugoslavia, 1972 (smallpox) ===
The 1972 Yugoslav smallpox outbreak was the final outbreak of smallpox in Europe. The World Health Organization fought the outbreak with extensive quarantine and a cordon sanitaire, and the government instituted martial law.

=== Case of Kaci Hickox' return to US, 2014 (Ebola) ===
In 2014, Kaci Hickox, a Doctors Without Borders nurse from Maine, legally battled 21-day quarantines imposed by the states of New Jersey and Maine after returning home from treating Ebola patients in Sierra Leone. "Hickox was sequestered in a medical tent for days because New Jersey announced new Ebola regulations the day she arrived. She eventually was allowed to travel to Maine, where the state sought to impose a 'voluntary quarantine' before trying and failing to create a buffer between her and others. A state judge rejected attempts to restrict her movements, saying she posed no threat as long as she wasn't demonstrating any symptoms of Ebola. Hickox said health care professionals like those at the U.S. Centers for Disease Control and Prevention – not politicians like New Jersey Gov. Chris Christie and Maine Gov. Paul LePage – should be in charge of making decisions that are grounded in science, not fear."

=== COVID-19 pandemic, 2020–2023 ===
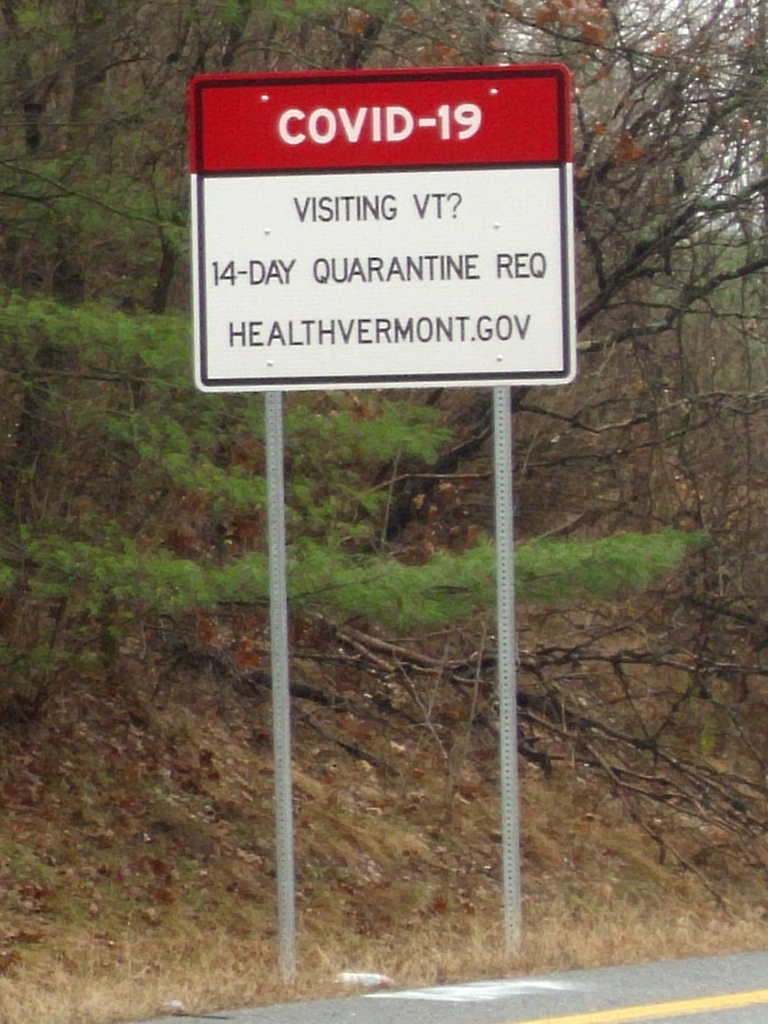
A road sign at an exit on Interstate 91 in Vermont, photographed in November 2020.

During the COVID-19 pandemic, multiple governmental actors enacted quarantines in an effort to curb the rapid spread of the virus. Quarantine-like restrictions on movement included curfews and restrictions variously described as stay-at-home orders, shelter-in-place orders, shutdowns or lockdowns.

On 26 March 2020, 1.7 billion people worldwide were under some form of lockdown, which increased to 2.6 billion people two days later—around a third of the world's population.

==== Hubei ====
In Hubei, the origin of the epidemic, a cordon sanitaire was imposed on Wuhan and other major cities in China, affecting around 500 million people, which is unprecedented in scale in human history, to limit the rate of spread of the disease. The 'lockdown' of Wuhan, and subsequently a wider-scale 'lockdown' throughout Hubei province, began on 23 January 2020. At this stage, the spread of the virus in mainland China was running at approximately 50% growth in cases per day. On 8 February, the daily rate of spread fell below 10%.

==== Italy ====
As the outbreak spread there, beginning 22 February 2020, a cordon sanitaire was imposed on a group of at least 10 different municipalities in Northern Italy, effectively quarantining more than 50,000 people. This followed a second day when the declared detected cases leapt enormously (the period from 21 to 23 February saw daily increases of 567%, 295% and 90% respectively). A week later the rate of increase of cases in Italy was significantly reduced (the period from 29 February to 4 March saw daily increases of 27%, 50%, 20%, 23%, and 23%).

On 8 March 2020, a much wider region of Northern Italy was placed under quarantine restrictions, involving around 16 million people. On the next day, the quarantine was extended to the whole of Italy, effective on 10 March 2020, placing roughly 60 million people under quarantine.

A team of Chinese experts, together with some 31 tonnes of supplies, arrived in Rome on 13 March 2020 to help Italy fight the virus.

On 22 March 2020, Russia sent nine Ilyushin 76 planes with expert virologists, epidemiologists, medical equipment, and pharmaceuticals in a humanitarian aid operation that Italian media dubbed "From Russia With Love".

Eventually the lockdown was extended until 3 May, although starting from 14 April stationery shops, bookshops, and children clothing's shops were allowed to open.

On 26 April 2020, the so-called "Phase 2" was announced, to start from 4 May. Movements across regions were still forbidden, while movements between municipalities were allowed only to visit relatives or for work and health reasons. Moreover, closed factories could re-open, but schools, bars, restaurants, and barbers were still closed.

As at 4 May 2020, when new cases were running around 0.5%, (c. 1600 persons) per day and consistently falling, it was expected that museums and retailers might reopen from 18 May, while hairdressers, bars and restaurants were expected to reopen fully on 1 June.

Regional lockdowns were subsequently imposed as further waves of the virus spread through the country.

==== Rest of Europe ====
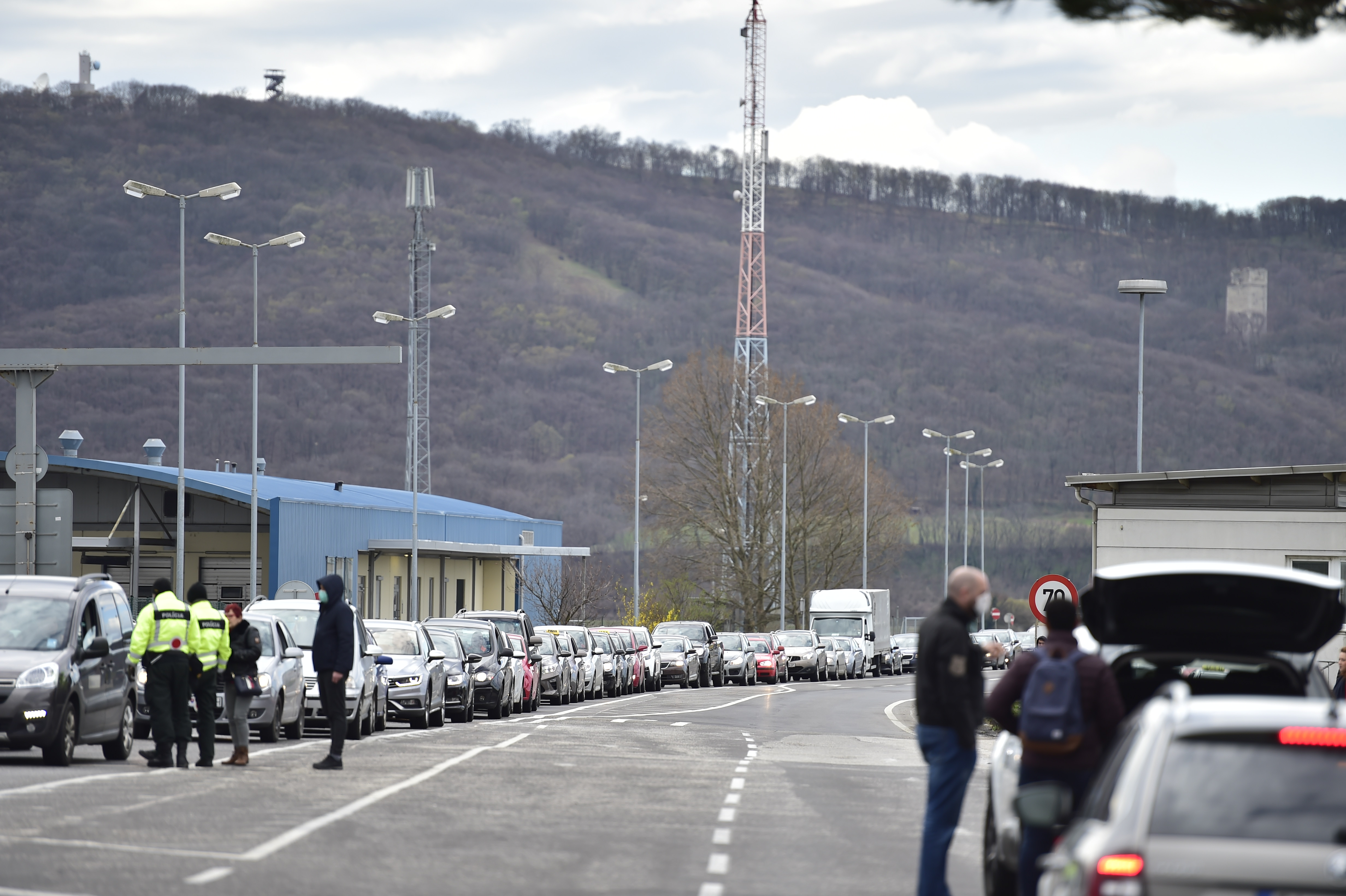
Slovakia closed borders to non-residents because of the coronavirus disease 2019 pandemic.

As cases of the virus spread to and took hold in more European countries, many followed the earlier examples of China and Italy and began instituting policies of lockdown. Notable among these were Ireland (where schools were closed in mid March for the rest of the month, and limits were set on sizes of meetings), Spain (where a lockdown was announced on 14 March), Czech Republic, Norway, Denmark, Iceland, Poland, Turkey, and France, while the United Kingdom noticeably lagged behind in adopting such measures.

As of 18 March 2020, more than 250 million people were in lockdown across Europe.

==== Rest of the world ====
In the immediate context of the start of the pandemic in Wuhan, countries neighbouring or close to China adopted a cautious approach. For example, Sri Lanka, Macau, Hong Kong, Vietnam, Japan, and South Korea had all imposed some degree of lockdown by 19 February. As countries across the world reported escalating case numbers and deaths, more and more countries began to announce travel restrictions and lockdowns. Africa and Latin America were relatively delayed in the spread of the virus, but even on these continents, countries began to impose travel bans and lockdowns. Brazil and Mexico began lockdowns in late February and much of the rest of Latin America followed suit in early March. Much of Africa was on lockdown by the start of April. Kenya, for example, blocked certain international flights and subsequently placed a ban on 'global' meetings.

As of 1 April 2020, more than 280 million people, or about 86% of the population, were under some form of lockdown in the United States, 59 million people were in lockdown in South Africa, and 1.3 billion people were in lockdown in India.

== Self-quarantine ==
Self-quarantine (or self-isolation) is a popular term that emerged during the COVID-19 pandemic, which spread to most countries in 2020. Citizens able to do so were encouraged to stay home to limit the spread of the disease. Health specialists advise that self-quarantine lasts 14 days. Two weeks gives the necessary time for them to determine whether or not they will become ill and become contagious to others.

== Other uses ==
U.S. President John F. Kennedy euphemistically referred to the U.S. Navy's interdiction of shipping en route to Cuba during the Cuban Missile Crisis as a "quarantine" rather than a blockade, because a quarantine is a legal act in peacetime, whereas a blockade is defined as an act of aggression under the U.N. Charter.

In computer science, "quarantining" describes putting files infected by computer viruses into a special directory, so as to eliminate the threat they pose, without irreversibly deleting them.

The Spanish term for quarantine, (la) cuarentena, refers also to the period of postpartum confinement in which a new mother and her baby are sheltered from the outside world.

== See also ==
- Biosecurity – Preventive measures designed to reduce the risk of infectious disease transmission
- Epidemiology – Study of health and disease within a population
- Extra-Terrestrial Exposure Law – Regulations adopted by NASA to guard the Earth against any harmful contamination
- Infection control – Medical discipline for preventing nosocomial or healthcare-associated infection
- Isolation (health care) – Measure taken to prevent contagious diseases from being spread
- Lazaretto – Quarantine station for maritime travelers
- Lytton Quarantine Station – Heritage-listed former quarantine station in Brisbane, Queensland, Australia
- Pest house – Building used for persons afflicted with communicable diseases
- Protective sequestration – Public health term
- Quaranup, a former quarantine station in Albany, Western Australia
- Social distancing – Infection control technique by keeping a distance from each other
