= 1972 Yugoslav smallpox outbreak =

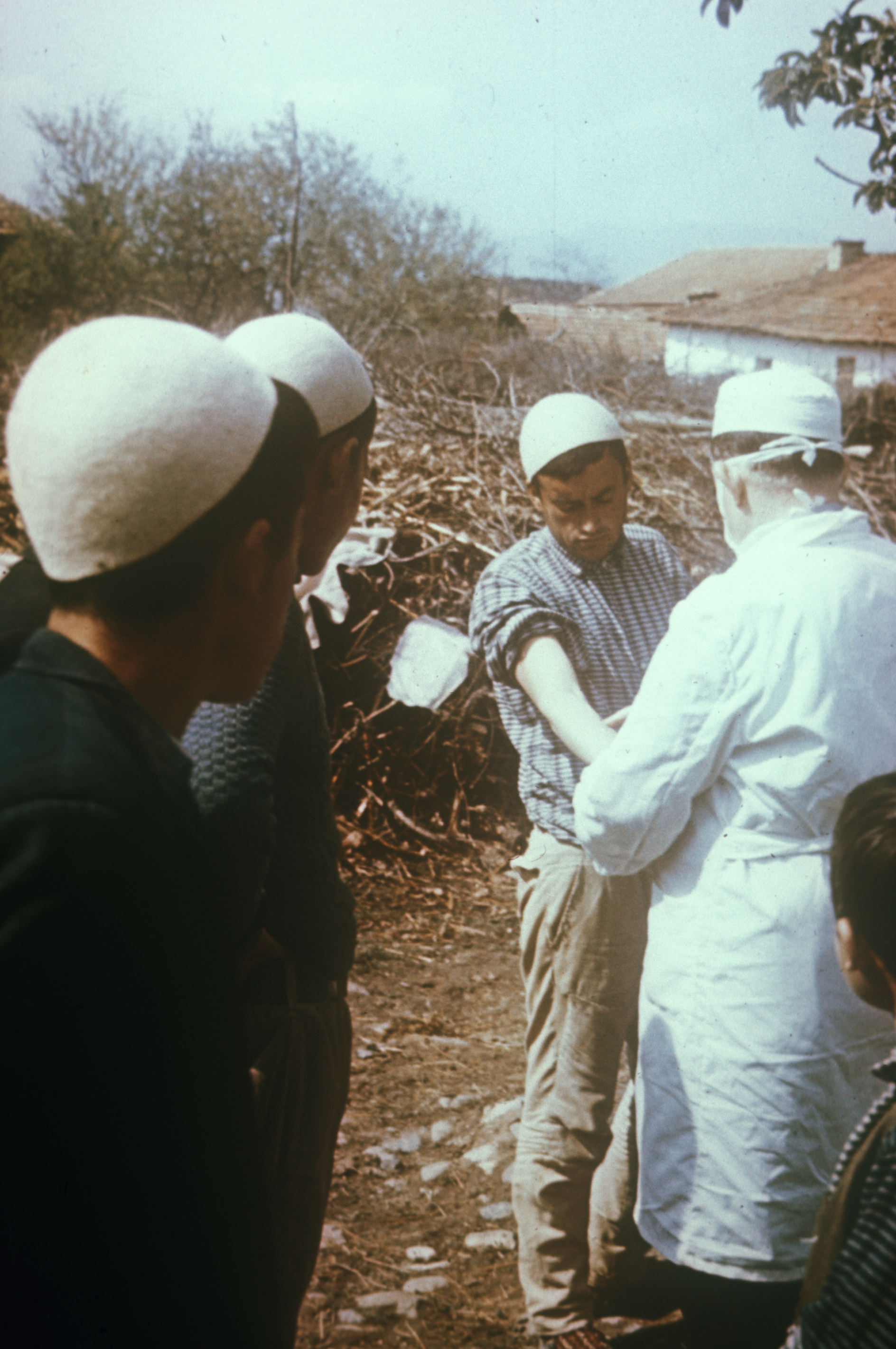
- Field physicians checking an immunization reaction in a man during a smallpox epidemic, Kosovo, 1972
- Disease: Smallpox
- Pathogen: Variola
- Location: SFR Yugoslavia: SR Serbia; SAP Kosovo; Belgrade
- Index case: A Muslim pilgrim from SAP Kosovo
- Dates: 16 February - 11 April 1972
- Confirmed cases: 175
- Deaths: 35

The 1972 Yugoslav smallpox outbreak was the largest outbreak of smallpox in Europe after the Second World War. It was centered in Kosovo, a province of Serbia within Yugoslavia, and the capital city of Belgrade. A Kosovar Albanian Muslim pilgrim had contracted the virus in the Middle East. Upon returning to his home in Kosovo, he started the epidemic in which 175 people were infected, killing 35. The epidemic was efficiently contained by enforced quarantine and mass vaccination. The 1982 film Variola Vera is based on the event.

== Background ==
By 1972 the disease was considered to be eradicated in Europe. The population of Yugoslavia had been regularly vaccinated for 50 years, and the last case was reported in 1930. This was the major cause of the initial slow reaction by doctors, who did not promptly recognize the disease.

In October 1970, an Afghan family went on pilgrimage from Afghanistan, where smallpox was endemic, to Mashhad in Iran, triggering an epidemic of smallpox in Iran that would last until September 1972. By late 1971, smallpox-infected pilgrims had carried smallpox from Iran into Syria and Iraq.

== Outbreak ==
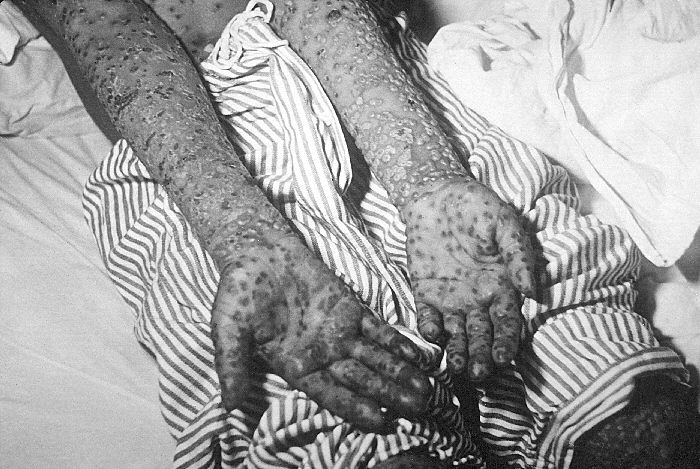
Patient with smallpox, Kosovo, Yugoslavia epidemic, March and April 1972.

In early 1972, a 38-year-old Kosovo Albanian Muslim clergyman named Ibrahim Hoti, from Damnjan near Gjakova, Kosovo, undertook the Hajj. He visited holy sites in Iraq, where cases of smallpox were known. He returned home on February 15. The following morning he suffered aches and was tired. After feeling feverish for a couple of days and developing a rash, he recovered, likely because he had been vaccinated two months earlier.

On March 3, Latif Mumdžić, a thirty-year-old teacher, who had just arrived in Đakovica to attend school, fell ill. He had no known direct contact with Hoti. He may have been infected by one of the clergyman's friends or relatives who visited during his illness, or simply by passing the clergyman in the street. When Mumdžić visited the local medical center two days later, doctors attempted to treat his fever with penicillin (smallpox is a virus, so this was ineffective). His condition did not improve, and after a couple of days, his brother took him to the hospital in Čačak, 150 km to the north in Serbia. The doctors there could not help him, so he was transferred by ambulance to the central hospital in Belgrade. On March 9, Mumdžić was shown to medical students and staff as a case of an atypical reaction to penicillin, which was a plausible explanation for his condition. On the following day, Mumdžić suffered massive internal bleeding and, despite efforts to save his life, died that evening. The cause of death was listed as "reaction to penicillin". In fact, he had contracted Hemorrhagic Smallpox , a highly contagious form of smallpox. Before his death, Mumdžić directly infected 38 people (including nine doctors and nurses), eight of whom died. A few days after Mumdžić's death, 140 smallpox cases erupted across Kosovo province. On 16 March, the smallpox virus was isolated in Belgrade by Ana Gligić, the head of the national smallpox laboratory, which was followed by strict measures that prevented the spread of the disease in the city and thus a major disaster.

== Reaction ==
The government's reaction was swift. Martial law was declared on March 16. Measures included cordons sanitaires of villages and neighborhoods, roadblocks, a prohibition of public assembly, closure of borders and prohibition of all non-essential travel. Hotels were requisitioned for quarantines in which 10,000 people who may have been in contact with the virus were held under guard by the Yugoslav People's Army.

Mumdžić's brother developed a smallpox rash on March 20, resulting in medical authorities realizing that Mumdžić had died of smallpox. The authorities undertook massive revaccination of the population, helped by the World Health Organization (WHO), "almost the entire Yugoslavian population of 18 million people was vaccinated". Leading experts on smallpox were flown in to help, including Donald Henderson and Don Francis.

By mid-May, the outbreak was contained and the country returned to normal life. During the epidemic, 175 people contracted smallpox and 35 died.

== Legacy ==
The Yugoslav government received international praise for the successful containment of the epidemic, which was one of the finest hours for Donald Henderson and the WHO, as well as one of the crucial steps in the eradication of smallpox.

In 1982, Serbian director Goran Marković made the film Variola Vera about the outbreak.
