= Protective sequestration =

Public health term

Protective sequestration, in public health, is social distancing measures taken to protect a small, defined, and still-healthy population from outsiders during an epidemic (or pandemic) before the infection reaches that population. It is sometimes referred to as "reverse cordon sanitaire." Protective sequestration may be employed to protect specific, especially vulnerable people from exposure.

Due to the disruption that protective sequestration can cause, it is typically considered only under exceptional circumstances where implementation and enforcement are feasible. It is more easily achieved in circumstances where voluntary compliance of the sequestered population is likely.

== Terminology ==
The term "protective sequestration" was coined by Howard Markel and his colleagues, in their paper that described the successes and failures of several communities in the United States in their attempts to shield themselves from the 1918–1920 Spanish flu pandemic during the second wave of that pandemic (September–December 1918). The term avoids the use of the word quarantine, which, in public health, refers to the voluntary or enforced detention of a person who, because of actual or possible contact with an infectious agent, may have become infected and therefore be capable of passing it along to others. The duration of quarantine is determined by the incubation period of the infection, i.e., the time between acquisition of the infectious agent and the development of signs or symptoms of the illness caused by that agent.

== Advantages and disadvantages ==
An advantage of protective sequestration is that it shields selected people from infection and possibly buys them time for the development and distribution of drugs or vaccine or to avoid a period of especially high transmission. A disadvantage, apart from its social and economic cost, is that those sequestered have no opportunity to develop naturally-acquired immunity to the infectious agent through contact with it, and, therefore, they remain susceptible to the agent during subsequent waves of the epidemic or pandemic.

== Usage ==
=== Spanish flu ===
During the 1918 Spanish flu pandemic, factors that contributed to the rare successes of protective sequestration were the following:

- The community leaders recognized the danger posed by the pandemic before it reached the community and implemented protective measures early (before neighboring communities did)
- Taking advantage of the community's remoteness or natural barriers that were generally, but not always, present, the community leadership established and enforced a cordon around the outer perimeter of the community
- Anyone seeking entry into the community was placed in quarantine for the incubation period of the infection and released into the community only after they were shown to be free of infection. Furthermore, the leadership established a system whereby supplies were delivered and received in a way that eliminated human-to-human contact with those delivering the supplies
- Families were kept together so that life within the protected zone was as normal as possible. Schools remained in session and places of worship remained open, people continued to work, and entertainment remained available
- Protective sequestration measures remained in effect for the duration of the risk, which was short enough that residents would not become restless.

The best known historical example is the measures taken by the town of Gunnison, Colorado, during the 1918 influenza epidemic. To prevent an introduction of the infection, the town isolated itself from the surrounding area for two months at the end of 1918. All highways were barricaded near the county lines. Train conductors warned all passengers that if they stepped outside of the train in Gunnison, they would be arrested and quarantined for five days. Although no deaths from the flu were recorded during the sequestration, it was not sustainable long-term; as townspeople became increasingly restless, the restrictions were lifted in February 1919, but a flu outbreak hit Gunnison in March, killing five people. Several other communities adopted similar measures.

Princeton University utilized protective sequestration and avoided any fatalities.

In the South Pacific, the Governor of American Samoa, John Martin Poyer, imposed a reverse cordon sanitaire of the islands from all incoming ships, successfully achieving zero deaths within the territory during the influenza epidemic. In contrast, the neighboring New Zealand-controlled Western Samoa was among the hardest hit, with a 90% infection rate and over 20% of its adults dying from the disease.

In late 1918, Spain attempted unsuccessfully to prevent the spread of the Spanish flu by imposing border controls, roadblocks, restricted rail travel, and a maritime cordon sanitaire prohibiting ships with sick passengers from landing, but by then the epidemic was already in progress in Spain.

=== COVID-19 pandemic ===
- During COVID-19, several communities implemented measures to allow vulnerable populations to sequester away from congregate living settings. In Washington, DC, several hotels were contracted to provide isolation and quarantine sites for unhoused individuals. In addition, the Pandemic Emergency Program for Medically Vulnerable Individuals (PEP-V) operated dedicated hotel sites exclusively for medically vulnerable unhoused individuals to avoid congregate living settings and voluntarily sequester to avoid community spread.
- Many incarcerated individuals experienced involuntary protective sequestration in solitary confinement during the pandemic.
- On March 16, 2020, the tribal leadership of the Havasupai closed access to its community in Havasu Creek to tourists to prevent the introduction of COVID-19 into the population.
- In March 2020, several villages in Alaska, such as Arctic Village and Fort Yukon, AK have severely restricted travel into these villages, to prevent the introduction of COVID-19. Since March 14, all arrivals are subject to a mandatory two-week quarantine. Volunteers patrolled the villages to stop any outsiders attempting to enter Fort Yukon by snowmobile.

== See also ==
- Cordon sanitaire (medicine)
- Zero-COVID
