= List of acts of the Parliament of Great Britain from 1721 =

This is a complete list of acts of the Parliament of Great Britain for the year 1721.

For acts passed until 1707, see the list of acts of the Parliament of England and the list of acts of the Parliament of Scotland. See also the list of acts of the Parliament of Ireland.

For acts passed from 1801 onwards, see the list of acts of the Parliament of the United Kingdom. For acts of the devolved parliaments and assemblies in the United Kingdom, see the list of acts of the Scottish Parliament, the list of acts of the Northern Ireland Assembly, and the list of acts and measures of Senedd Cymru; see also the list of acts of the Parliament of Northern Ireland.

The number shown after each act's title is its chapter number. Acts are cited using this number, preceded by the year(s) of the reign during which the relevant parliamentary session was held; thus the Union with Ireland Act 1800 is cited as "39 & 40 Geo. 3. c. 67", meaning the 67th act passed during the session that started in the 39th year of the reign of George III and which finished in the 40th year of that reign. Note that the modern convention is to use Arabic numerals in citations (thus "41 Geo. 3" rather than "41 Geo. III"). Acts of the last session of the Parliament of Great Britain and the first session of the Parliament of the United Kingdom are both cited as "41 Geo. 3".

Acts passed by the Parliament of Great Britain did not have a short title; however, some of these acts have subsequently been given a short title by acts of the Parliament of the United Kingdom (such as the Short Titles Act 1896).

Before the Acts of Parliament (Commencement) Act 1793 came into force on 8 April 1793, acts passed by the Parliament of Great Britain were deemed to have come into effect on the first day of the session in which they were passed. Because of this, the years given in the list below may in fact be the year before a particular act was passed.

== 7 Geo. 1. St. 2 ==
The seventh session of the 5th Parliament of Great Britain, which met from 31 July 1721 until 10 August 1721.

This session was also traditionally cited as 7 Geo. 1. Stat. 2, 7 Geo. 1. st. 2, 7 G. 1. Stat. 2, 7 G. 1. St. 2 or 7 G. 1. st. 2.

=== Public acts ===
Short title	Citation	Royal assent
Long title
National Debt Act 1721 or the South Sea Sufferer's Act 1721 (repealed)	7 Geo. 1. St. 2. c. 1	10 August 1721
An Act for making several provisions to restore the publick credit, which suffers by the frauds and mismanagements of the late directors of the South-Sea Company, and others. (Repealed by Statute Law Revision Act 1870 (33 & 34 Vict. c. 69))

=== Private acts ===
Short title	Citation	Royal assent
Long title
Lostan's Naturalization Act 1721	7 Geo. 1. St. 2. c. 1 Pr.	10 August 1721
An Act for naturalizing James Lostan.

=== Sources ===
- Pickering, Danby, ed. (1765). "Anno septimo Georgii I. Stat. 2". The Statutes at Large. Vol. 14: From the Fifth to the Ninth Year of King George I. Cambridge: Joseph Bentham. pp. 360–368 – via Internet Archive.
- Pickering, Danby, ed. (1765). "Anno septimo Georgii I. Stat. 2". The Statutes at Large. Vol. 14: From the Fifth to the Ninth Year of King George I. Cambridge: Joseph Bentham. pp. 360–368 – via Google Books.
- Pickering, Danby, ed. (1765). "Anno septimo Georgii I. Stat. 2". The Statutes at Large. Vol. 14: From the Fifth to the Ninth Year of King George I. Cambridge: Joseph Bentham. pp. 360–368 – via Google Books.
- Pickering, Danby, ed. (1765). "Anno septimo Georgii I. Stat. 2". The Statutes at Large. Vol. 14: From the Fifth to the Ninth Year of King George I. Cambridge: Joseph Bentham. pp. 360–368 – via Internet Archive.
- Journals of the House of Commons. Vol. 19. London: His Majesty's Stationery Office. 1803. pp. 640–645 – via Google Books.
- Chronological Table of and Index to the Statutes. Vol. 1: To the End of the Session 59 Vict. Sess. 2 (1895) (13th ed.). London: Her Majesty's Stationery Office. 1896. p. 96 – via Google Books.

== 8 Geo. 1 ==
The eighth session of the 5th Parliament of Great Britain, which met from 19 October 1721 until 7 March 1722.

This session was also traditionally cited as 8 G. 1.

=== Public acts ===
Short title	Citation	Royal assent
Long title
Land Tax Act 1721 (repealed)	8 Geo. 1. c. 1	7 December 1721
An Act for granting an Aid to His Majesty, by a Land Tax, to be raised in Great Britain, for the Service of the Year One Thousand Seven Hundred Twenty-two. (Repealed by Statute Law Revision Act 1867 (30 & 31 Vict. c. 59))
Lotteries Act 1721 (repealed)	8 Geo. 1. c. 2	12 February 1722
An Act for continuing the Duties on Malt, Mum, Cyder, and Perry, to raise Money, by Way of a Lottery, for the Service of the Year One Thousand Seven Hundred Twenty-two; and for transferring the Deficiencies of a late Malt Act (Note: Taxation, etc. Act 1712 (12 Ann. c. 2)) to the Land Tax for the said Year; and for giving Time for inserting the Money given with Apprentices in their Indentures; and touching lost Bills, Tickets, or Orders; and for exchanging the Tickets in the Exchequer for Certificates; and for suppressing Lotteries denominated Sales, and other private Lotteries; and for enlarging the Time for the Accomptant General of the Bank of England to return Duplicates of Annuities into the Exchequer. (Repealed for England and Wales and Scotland by Betting and Lotteries Act 1934 (24 & 25 Geo. 5. c. 58) and for Northern Ireland by Betting and Lotteries Act (Northern Ireland) 1957 (c. 19 (N.I.)))
Mutiny Act 1721 (repealed)	8 Geo. 1. c. 3	12 February 1722
An Act for the punishing Mutiny and Desertion, and for the better Payment of the Army and their Quarters. (Repealed by Statute Law Revision Act 1867 (30 & 31 Vict. c. 59))
Salt Duties, etc. Act 1721 (repealed)	8 Geo. 1. c. 4	12 February 1722
An Act for taking off the Duty upon all Salt used in the curing of Red Herrings, and laying a proportionable Duty upon all Red Herrings consumed at Home only; and for ascertaining the Customs and Excise payable for the Sugar-houses in Scotland; and for making an Allowance for Salt lost in any Harbour or River of this Realm; and for the better securing the Duties on Salt delivered in Scotland. (Repealed by Statute Law Revision Act 1867 (30 & 31 Vict. c. 59))
Highgate and Hampstead Highways Act 1721 (repealed)	8 Geo. 1. c. 5	12 February 1722
An Act to explain and amend the Act, passed in the Third Year of His present Majesty's Reign, (Note: Middlesex and Hertfordshire Roads Act 1716 (3 Geo. 1. c. 4 Pr.)) for repairing the Highway from several Places therein mentioned, leading towards Highgate Gatehouse and Hampstead, in the County of Middlesex. (Repealed by Highgate and Hampstead Roads Act 1776 (16 Geo. 3. c. 76) and Roads to Highgate House and Hampstead Act 1821 (1 & 2 Geo. 4. c. cx))
Quakers Act 1721 (repealed)	8 Geo. 1. c. 6	12 February 1722
An Act for granting the People called Quakers such Forms of Affirmation, or Declaration, as may remove the Difficulties which many of them lie under. (Repealed by Promissory Oaths Act 1871 (34 & 35 Vict. c. 48))
Elgin Beer Duties Act 1721 (repealed)	8 Geo. 1. c. 7	12 February 1722
An Act for laying a Duty of Two Pennies Scots, or one Sixth Part of a Penny Sterling, upon every Scots Pint of Ale or Beer that shall be brewed for Sale, vended, or tapped, within the Town of Elgin, and Privileges thereof, for paying the public Debts of the said Town, and for other the Purposes therein mentioned. (Repealed by Statute Law Revision Act 1948 (11 & 12 Geo. 6. c. 62))
Commerce with Certain Countries Act 1721 (repealed)	8 Geo. 1. c. 8	12 February 1722
An Act to enable His Majesty effectually to prohibit Commerce, for the Space of One Year, with any Country that is, or shall be, infected with the Plague; and for shortening the Continuance of an Act, passed in the Seventh Year of His Majesty's Reign, (Note: Quarantine Act 1720 (7 Geo. 1. St. 1. c. 3)) intituled, "An Act for repealing an Act, made in the Ninth Year of Her late Majesty Queen Anne, (Note: Quarantine Act 1710 (9 Ann. c. 2)) intituled, 'An Act to oblige Ships coming from Places infected more effectually to perform their Quarentine;' and for the better preventing the Plague being brought from Foreign Parts into Great Britain or Ireland, or the Isles of Guernsey, Jersey, Alderney, Sark, or Man; and to hinder the spreading of Infection." (Repealed by Statute Law Revision Act 1867 (30 & 31 Vict. c. 59))
Kilburn Road Act 1721 (repealed)	8 Geo. 1. c. 9	12 February 1722
An Act for continuing an Act, passed in the Tenth Year of the Reign of Her late Majesty, intituled, "An Act for repairing the Highway, between a certain Place called Kilburn Bridge, (Note: Kilburn Bridge was located where the Edgware Road (Kilburn High Road) crossed the River Westbourne. The river is now culverted. 51°32′08″N 0°11′25″W) in the County of Middlesex, and Sparrows Hern, (Note: Sparrows Herne was a settlement located between Bushey and Bushey Heath. The section of the A411 road in the area continues the name. 51°38′17″N 0°21′04″W) in the County of Hertford;" (Note: Kilburn Road Act 1711 (10 Ann. c. 3)) and for making the said Act more effectual. (Repealed by Kilburn Road Act 1779 (19 Geo. 3. c. 120) and Metropolis Roads Act 1826 (7 Geo. 4. c. cxlii))
Quarantine Act 1721 (repealed)	8 Geo. 1. c. 10	12 February 1722
An Act for repealing such Clauses in the Act, passed in the Seventh Year of His Majesty's Reign (relating to Quarantine and the Plague), as gives Power to remove Persons from their Habitations, or to make Lines about Places infected. (Repealed by Statute Law Revision Act 1867 (30 & 31 Vict. c. 59))
Bridport Harbour Act 1721 (repealed)	8 Geo. 1. c. 11	12 February 1722
An Act for restoring and re-building the Haven and Piers of Bridport, in the County of Dorset; and for making a Sluice there. (Repealed by Bridport Harbour Act 1823 (4 Geo. 4. c. xix))
Importation Act 1721 or the Naval Stores Act 1721 (repealed)	8 Geo. 1. c. 12	12 February 1722
An Act, giving further Encouragement for the Importation of Naval Stores; and for other Purposes therein mentioned. (Repealed by Statute Law Revision Act 1867 (30 & 31 Vict. c. 59))
Nottingham and Leicester Highways Act 1721 (repealed)	8 Geo. 1. c. 13	12 February 1722
An Act for the amending the Highways leading from Brampton Bridge, near Church Brampton, in the County of Northampton, through the Parish of Thornby, to a Bridge called Welford Bridge, in the Parish of Welford, in the said County; and also the great Post Road, from a Place called Morter Pitt Hill, in the Parish of Pisford, in the said County, through the Towns and Parishes of Brixworth, Lamport, Maidwell, Kelmarsh, and Oxenden Magna, to a Bridge called Chain Bridge, leading into Market Harborough, in the County of Leicester. (Repealed by Northampton Roads Act 1778 (18 Geo. 3. c. 112))
Eden River, Cumberland (Temporary Tolls for Improvement) Act 1721 (repealed)	8 Geo. 1. c. 14	12 February 1722
An Act for making the River Eden navigable, to Bank End, in the County of Cumberland. (Repealed by Statute Law Revision Act 1948 (11 & 12 Geo. 6. c. 62))
Silk Subsidies, Various Duties, Import of Furs, etc. Act 1721 (repealed)	8 Geo. 1. c. 15	7 March 1722
An Act for Encouragement of the Silk Manufactures of this Kingdom; and for taking off several Duties on Merchandizes exported; and for reducing the Duties upon Beaver Skins, Pepper, Mace, Cloves, and Nutmegs, imported; and for Importation of all Furs of the Product of the British Plantations into this Kingdom only; and that the Two Corporations of Assurance, on any Suits brought on their Policies, shall be liable only to Single Damages and Costs of Suit. (Repealed by Statute Law Revision Act 1867 (30 & 31 Vict. c. 59) and Statute Law Revision Act 1948 (11 & 12 Geo. 6. c. 62))
Salt Duties, etc. (No. 2) Act 1721 (repealed)	8 Geo. 1. c. 16	7 March 1722
An Act for taking off the Duty upon all Salt used in the Curing and Making of White Herrings; and, instead thereof, laying a proportionable Duty upon all White Herrings consumed at Home only; and for making an Allowance for Tobacco exported from Scotland in the Time therein mentioned; and for giving further Relief to the Resiners of Rock Salt. (Repealed by Statute Law Revision Act 1867 (30 & 31 Vict. c. 59))
Shipwrecked Mariners Act 1721 (repealed)	8 Geo. 1. c. 17	12 February 1722
An Act for the more equal paying and better collecting certain small Sums therein mentioned, for Relief of ship-wrecked Mariners and distressed Persons (His Majesty's Subjects) in the Kingdom of Portugal; and for other pious and charitable Purposes, usually contributed to by the Merchants trading to Portugal. (Repealed by Consular Advances Act 1825 (6 Geo. 4. c. 87))
Customs, etc. Act 1721 (repealed)	8 Geo. 1. c. 18	7 March 1722
An Act to prevent the clandestine Running of Goods, and the Danger of Infection thereby; and to prevent Ships breaking their Quarantine; and to subject Copper Ore, of the Production of the British Plantations, to such Regulations as other enumerated Commodities of the like Production are subject. (Repealed by Statute Law Revision Act 1867 (30 & 31 Vict. c. 59))
Game Act 1721 (repealed)	8 Geo. 1. c. 19	7 March 1722
An Act for the better Recovery of the Penalties inflicted upon Persons who destroy the Game. (Repealed by Game Act 1831 (1 & 2 Will. 4. c. 32))
National Debt (No. 2) Act 1721 (repealed)	8 Geo. 1. c. 20	7 March 1722
An Act for paying off and canceling One Million of Exchequer Bills; and to give Ease to the South Sea Company, in respect of its present Obligation to circulate, or contribute towards circulating, Exchequer Bills; and to give further Time to that Company, for Re-payment of One Million which was lent to them; and for issuing a further Sum, in new Exchequer Bills, towards His Majesty's Supply, to be discharged and canceled when the said Company shall re pay the Million owing by them; and that the Exchequer Bills which are to continue may be circulated at easy and moderate Rates; and for appropriating the Supplies granted to His Majesty in this Session of Parliament; and for Relief of the Sufferers at Nevis and St. Christophers, by an Invasion of the French in the late War; and for laying a further Duty on Apples imported; and for ascertaining the Duties on Pictures imported. (Repealed by Statute Law Revision Act 1870 (33 & 34 Vict. c. 69))
South Sea Company Act 1721 (repealed)	8 Geo. 1. c. 21	7 March 1722
An Act to enable the South Sea Company to dispose of the Effects in their Hands by Way of Lottery or Subscription, or to sell Part of their Fund, or Annuity, payable at the Exchequer, in order to pay the Debts of the said Company; and for Relief of such who were intended to have the Benefit of a late Act, (Note: National Debt Act 1721 (7 Geo. 1. St. 2. c. 1)) touching Payment of Ten per Centum therein mentioned. (Repealed by Statute Law Revision Act 1887 (50 & 51 Vict. c. 59))
National Debt (No. 3) Act 1721 (repealed)	8 Geo. 1. c. 22	7 March 1722
An Act to prevent the Mischiefs by forging Powers to transfer such Stocks, or to receive such Annuities or Dividends, as are therein mentioned, or by fraudulently personating the true Owners thereof; and to rectify Mistakes of the late Managers for taking Subscriptions for increasing the Capital Stock of the South Sea Company, and in the Instruments founded thereupon. (Repealed by Statute Law Revision Act 1870 (33 & 34 Vict. c. 69))
South Sea Company (No. 2) Act 1721 (repealed)	8 Geo. 1. c. 23	7 March 1722
An Act for prolonging the Times for hearing and determining Claims before the Trustees in whom the Estates of the late South Sea Directors, and of John Arslabie Esquire, and likewise of James Craggs Esquire, deceased, are vested; and for other Purposes therein mentioned. (Repealed by Statute Law Revision Act 1867 (30 & 31 Vict. c. 59))
Piracy Act 1721 (repealed)	8 Geo. 1. c. 24	7 March 1722
An Act for the more effectual suppressing of Piracy. (Repealed by Statute Law (Repeals) Act 1993 (c. 50))
Judgments, Wales and Counties Palatine Act 1721 (repealed)	8 Geo. 1. c. 25	7 March 1722
An Act for supplying some Defects in the Statute of the Twenty-third of King Henry the Eighth, intituled, "An Act for Obligations to be taken by Two Chief Justices, the Mayor of the Staple and the Recorder of London;" (Note: Recognizances for Debt Act 1531 (23 Hen. 8. c. 6)) and for setting down the Time of signing Judgements in the Principality of Wales and Counties Palatine. (Repealed by Civil Procedure Acts Repeal Act 1879 (42 & 43 Vict. c. 59))
Chelsea Waterworks Act 1721 or the Westminster (Water Supply) Act 1721 (repealed)	8 Geo. 1. c. 26	7 March 1722
An Act for better supplying the City and Liberties of Westminster, and Parts adjacent, with Water. (Repealed by Chelsea Waterworks Act 1852 (15 & 16 Vict. c. clvi))
York Butter Trade Supervision Act 1721 (repealed)	8 Geo. 1. c. 27	7 March 1722
An Act for the better preventing Abuses committed in weighing and packing of Butter, in the City of York. (Repealed by Statute Law Revision Act 1948 (11 & 12 Geo. 6. c. 62))
Aberdeen Commissary Court Records Act 1721 (repealed)	8 Geo. 1. c. 28	7 March 1722
An Act for supplying the Records of the Commissary Court of Aberdeen, burnt or lost in the late Fire there. (Repealed by Statute Law (Repeals) Act 1977 (c. 18))
Charterhouse Governors (Quorum) Act 1721 (repealed)	8 Geo. 1. c. 29	7 March 1722
An Act for preventing Delays in the Execution of the Trust reposed in the Governors of the Hospital of King James, founded in Charter House, at the Charges of Thomas Sutton Esquire, for the Benefit of the said Hospital. (Repealed by Statute Law (Repeals) Act 2013 (c. 2))
Whitechapel Highways Act 1721 (repealed)	8 Geo. 1. c. 30	7 March 1722
An Act for repairing the Highways from The Stones-end at White Chappel Church, in the County of Middlesex, to Shenfield, and to the furthermost Part of the Parish of Woodford, leading to the Town of Epping, in the County of Essex. (Repealed by St. Mary, Whitechapel Roads Act 1772 (12 Geo. 3. c. 102))
Sevenoaks Grammar School and Charity Act 1721	8 Geo. 1. c. 31	7 March 1722
An Act to vest the Ground, Wharf, and Key, called Wooll Key, in the Parish of All Saints, Barking, in the City of London, with the Buildings and Warehouses thereupon, in Trustees, for His Majesty, His Heirs and Successors for ever, subject to an Agreement made, on His Majesty's Behalf, with the Wardens and Assistants of the Free School in Sevenoake, in the County of Kent.

=== Private acts ===
Short title	Citation	Royal assent
Long title
Naturalization of Van Thienen and Baroness of Schoulenburgh.	8 Geo. 1. c. 1 Pr.	7 December 1721
An Act for naturalizing Benedictus Detelef Von Thienen and Melusine Baroness of Schoulenbourg.
Naturalization of Jeanne Coltee du Carel and others.	8 Geo. 1. c. 2 Pr.	7 December 1721
An Act for naturalizing Jeanne Coltee Du Carel and others.
Naturalization of Tabuteau, Murat and others.	8 Geo. 1. c. 3 Pr.	7 December 1721
An Act for naturalizing Auguste Tabuteau, Joseph Murat, and others.
Harcourt's Estate Act 1721	8 Geo. 1. c. 4 Pr.	12 February 1722
An Act to vest Two Fourth Parts of a Feefarm Rent, of Eighty-two Pounds, Eight Shillings, and Two Pence, issuing out of the Manor of Kingswood, in the County of Wilts (of which Two Fourth Parts the Lord Viscount Horcourt is seised in Fee), in Trustees, to the like Uses as a Messuage and Lands called Johnson's Farm, in the Parishes of Stanton Harcourt and Southly, or One of them, in the County of Oxon, were devised by Dame Elizabeth Harcourt Widow, deceased; and, in Lieu thereof, for vesting the said Premises called Johnson's Farm in the said Lord Viscount Harcourt and his Heirs.
Bristol Exchange Act 1721	8 Geo. 1. c. 5 Pr.	12 February 1722
An Act to enable the Mayor, Burgesses, and Commonalty, of the City of Bristol, to build an Exchange there, for the Conveniency of the Merchants and Traders of that City.
Wentworth's Estate Act 1721	8 Geo. 1. c. 6 Pr.	12 February 1722
An Act for Sale of Part of Sir John Wentworth's Estate, towards raising Part of the Sum of Ten Thousand Pounds, for the Purposes therein mentioned.
Milbanke's Estate Act 1721	8 Geo. 1. c. 7 Pr.	12 February 1722
An Act for vesting Part of the Estate of Sir Ralph Milbanke Baronet in Trustees, to be sold, for performing his Father's Will, and an Agreement made with his Brother and Sisters.
Steeple and Tyneham (Isle of Purbeck) (Dorset): uniting and consolidating the parish churches.	8 Geo. 1. c. 8 Pr.	12 February 1722
An Act for uniting and consolidating the Parish Churches of Stypul, alias Steeple, and Tyneham, within the Isle of Purbeck, in the County of Dorset.
Newton's Estate Act 1721	8 Geo. 1. c. 9 Pr.	12 February 1722
An Act to enable Elizabeth and Margaret Newton, Infants, during their Minority, with Consent of Trustees, to grant and fill up Leases of Part of the Estate late of John Newton Esquire, their Father, deceased.
Price's Estate Act 1721	8 Geo. 1. c. 10 Pr.	12 February 1722
An Act for vesting the Estate late of James Price, of Pilleth in the County of Radnor Esquire, deceased, in Trustees, to be sold, for Payment of several Portions and Legacies charged thereon.
Empowering the Commissioners and trustees for forfeited estates to give such relief to Hugh Wallace and his son Hugh Wallace, concerning their part in an heritable bond and enfeoffment upon the estate of James Earl of Linlithgow, attainted of high treason, as they have given to other claimants upon the said bond.	8 Geo. 1. c. 11 Pr.	12 February 1722
An Act to impower the Commissioners and Trustees for the forfeited Estates, to give such Relief to Hugh Wallace of Inglestoun Esquire, and Hugh Wallace his Son, in relation to their Part in an heritable Bond and Enfeossment upon the Estate of James late Earl of Linlithgow, attained of High Treason, as they have given to other Claimants upon the said Bond.
Palmer's Naturalization Act 1721	8 Geo. 1. c. 12 Pr.	12 February 1722
An Act for naturalizing Samuel Palmer.
Naturalization of Lucas Steinman, Paul Kruger and Henry Boon.	8 Geo. 1. c. 13 Pr.	12 February 1722
An Act for naturalizing Lucas Steinman, Paul Kruger, and Henry Boon.
Schele's Naturalization Act 1721	8 Geo. 1. c. 14 Pr.	12 February 1722
An Act for naturalizing Christopher Schele.
Viscount Dillon's Estate Act 1721	8 Geo. 1. c. 15 Pr.	7 March 1722
An Act to explain and amend an Act, made in the Second Year of the Reign of Her late Majesty Queen Anne, intituled, "An Act for Sale of Part of the Estate of Henry Lord Viscount Dillon in the Kingdom of Ireland; and for settling an Equivalent in other Part of his Estate on the Viscountess his Wife, for her Jointure;" (Note: Lord Viscount Dillon's Estate (Ireland) Act 1703 (2 & 3 Ann. c. 6 Pr.)) and to make a Provision for Bridget Viscountess Dillon, Wife of Richard now Lord Viscount Dillon.
Glastonbury Inclosure Act 1721	8 Geo. 1. c. 16 Pr.	7 March 1722
An Act for enclosing Glastonbury Commons, in the County of Somerset.
Davie's Estate Act 1721	8 Geo. 1. c. 17 Pr.	7 March 1722
An Act for vesting in Trustees the Reversion, Freehold, and Inheritance, of Part of the Estate late of Sir William Davie Baronet, deceased (expectant on a Term of Five Hundred Years), to be sold, for Payment of his Daughters Portions and Legacies.
Enabling His Majesty to make provisions for the children of James Mackdonald out of the estate of their uncle Sir Donald Mackdonald, which was forfeited to the Crown for high treason.	8 Geo. 1. c. 18 Pr.	7 March 1722
An Act to enable His Majesty to make such Provisions as is therein mentioned, for the Children of James Mackdonald, deceased, out of the Estate of the late Sir Donald Mackdonald their Uncle, which was forfeited to His Majesty for High Treason.
Drummond's Naturalization Act 1721	8 Geo. 1. c. 19 Pr.	7 March 1722
An Act for naturalizing Agatha Drummond.
Naturalization of James Girardot and Paul Amsink.	8 Geo. 1. c. 20 Pr.	7 March 1722
An Act for naturalizing James Girardot and Paul Amsinck.
Blydesteyn's Naturalization Act 1721	8 Geo. 1. c. 21 Pr.	7 March 1722
An Act to naturalize John Blydesteyn.

=== Sources ===
- Pickering, Danby, ed. (1765). "Anno octavo Georgii I". The Statutes at Large. Vol. 14: From the Fifth to the Ninth Year of King George I. Cambridge: Joseph Bentham. pp. 369–480 – via Internet Archive.
- Pickering, Danby, ed. (1765). "Anno octavo Georgii I". The Statutes at Large. Vol. 14: From the Fifth to the Ninth Year of King George I. Cambridge: Joseph Bentham. pp. 369–480 – via Internet Archive.
- Journals of the House of Commons. Vol. 19. London: His Majesty's Stationery Office. 1803. pp. 645–753 – via Google Books.
- Chronological Table of and Index to the Statutes. Vol. 1: To the End of the Session 59 Vict. Sess. 2 (1895) (13th ed.). London: Her Majesty's Stationery Office. 1896. p. 96 – via Google Books.
- "Acts of the Parliament of Great Britain from 1721". legislation.gov.uk. The National Archives.

== See also ==
- List of acts of the Parliament of Great Britain
