= Quarantine Act 1721 =

Act of the Parliament of Great Britain

- Act of Parliament
- Parliament of Great Britain
- Long title: An Act for repealing such Clauses in the Act passed in the seventh Year of His Majesty's Reign (relating to Quarantine and the Plague) as give Power to remove Persons from their Habitations, or to make Lines about Places infected.
- Citation: 8 Geo. 1. c. 10
- Territorial extent: Great Britain

Dates
- Royal assent: 12 February 1722
- Commencement: 25 March 1772 (Note: Section 1.)
- Repealed: 15 July 1867
Other legislation
Amends	Quarantine Act 1720
Amended by	Quarantine and Customs Act 1788
Repealed by	Statute Law Revision Act 1867
Relates to	Quarantine Act 1710

Status: Repealed

Text of statute as originally enacted

The Quarantine Act 1721 (8 Geo. 1. c. 10) was an act of the Parliament of Great Britain. The act was a health protection measure.

During the 18th century, the age of empire and sailing ships in England, outbreaks of diseases such as the plague seemed to travel from country to country very rapidly. Parliament responded to this threat by establishing the Quarantine Act 1721.

== Provisions ==
Section 1 of the act (the preamble) reads:

Whereas the parliament begun and holden at Westminster in the ninth year of her late majesty Queen Anne an act passed, intituled. An act to oblige ships coming from places infected more effectually to perform their quarantine: and whereas Marseilles, and other places in the south of France, have for some time past been visited with the plague, which occasioned just apprehensions lest the infection might be brought into this kingdom from the places so infected, or other places trading or corresponding therewith, unless timely care were taken to prevent the same: and whereas it hath been found by experience, that the said act is defective and ineffective for the purpose intended, and the penalties inflicted by the same not adequate to the offenses there-by prohibited; and some further provisions are necessary to be made, in case it should please Almighty God to permit these kingdoms to be afflicted with the plague; for remedy thereof; be it enacted. which is right

== Summary ==
In simple terms, this act made it mandatory for all ships and crew to undergo a complete quarantine of the ship’s cargo and crew to determine whether there was a threat to public health. If the ship was infected by a disease and the captain or any of the crew members knew and hid the information, they were subject to capital punishment. If a crew member was found to be infected, they were to be sent to a lazeret until they were cured of the disease and deemed eligible for release. A lazaret, or quarantine station, was usually constructed on an island, and was guarded by soldiers who were also confined to the island for fear of spreading the illness. If a person tried to escape, they also would be subject to capital punishment under the terms of that statute.

== Subsequent developments ==
Although the plague never reached England during the time the act was enforced, parliament continued to fear it, and the act was amended several times until it was finally repealed and replaced by the Public Health Act 1896 (59 & 60 Vict. c. 19). The act was first amended in 1743 by an act of Parliament (17 Geo. 2) passed in response to an epidemic in Messina. The act was then amended by the Quarantine and Customs Act 1788 (28 Geo. 3. c. 34) so that it included the cargoes of the ships as well as the people aboard. The act was last implemented during the approach of cholera in 1831.

The whole act was repealed by section 1 of, and the schedule to, the Statute Law Revision Act 1867 (30 & 31 Vict. c. 59), which came into force on 15 July 1867.
