= Lewis Brown (politician) =

Liberian politician

The Hon. Lewis G. Brown II is former Minister for Information, Cultural Affairs and Tourism in Liberia. After serving as minister of Information Cultural Affairs and Tourism, Lewis Garseedah Brown II was appointed by President Sirleaf as Liberia's permanent Ambassador at The United Nations and Liberia's Ambassador Extraordinary and Plenipotentiary at the Republic of Cuba in 2016. He's also the chairman of all ECOWAS's Ambassadors at UN. Amb. Brown also served as National Security Advisor to Charles Taylor and also Managing Director of LPRC.

== Political career ==
Brown served as Foreign Minister of Liberia in 2003 under President Charles Taylor. Brown was preceded by Monie R. Captan and replaced by Thomas Nimely.

On January 24, 2012, President Ellen Johnson-Sirleaf nominated Lewis Brown, the architect of the National Democratic Coalition (NDC) as her new Minister of Information, Culture Affairs and Tourism. Brown, who served as interim foreign minister of Liberia in 2003 under President Charles Taylor replaces Cletus Sieh who was dismissed in the wake of last year's violent riots by rampaging vacation students protesting the failure of the Monrovia City Corporation to pay their week's wages. Brown, a once-vocal critic of the Sirleaf administration, threw his weight behind the incumbent just weeks before the disintegration of the NDC headed by Dew Mayson. His sudden support of the president raised eyebrows and accusations from his detractors that he was eyeing a position in Sirleaf's cabinet.
