= Siracusa International Institute for Criminal Justice and Human Rights =

Not-for-profit organisation in Syracuse, Italy

The Siracusa International Institute for Criminal Justice and Human Rights
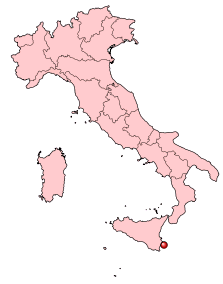
- Location of the city of Syracuse (red dot) within Italy.
- Country: Italy
- Town: Syracuse
- Founded: 1972
- Founder: M. Cherif Bassiouni
- Website: http://www.siracusainstitute.org

The Siracusa International Institute for Criminal Justice and Human Rights, until 2017 Istituto Superiore Internazionale di Scienze Criminali (ISISC) (in English, International Institute of Higher Studies in Criminal Sciences) is a not-for-profit organisation located in Syracuse, Italy, that was established in 1972. The organisation specializes in the design and implementation of human rights, rule of law, justice and capacity building projects throughout the world. The organisation pays particular attention to such issues that arise from situations in Arab and Muslim countries.

== History and accreditation ==
The institute was founded in 1972 by various experts, including Professor M. Cherif Bassiouni. It was founded initially by the AIDP and the City and Province of Syracuse in conjunction with the Chamber of Commerce. Subsequently, the institute has set up accords with the City of Noto and the Region of Sicily. The president of the Siracusa International Institute since 2017 is Jean François Thony.

It is a United Nations non-governmental organisation with consultative status (category II) and a non-governmental organisation with consultative status.

== Philosophy ==
The Siracusa International Institute is a not-for-profit organisation in consultative status with the United Nations and co-operates regularly with other regional, international, and educational organisations. It is devoted to researching, educating, and advancing the criminal sciences in their widest possible sense.

In this pursuit, the Siracusa International Institute actively engages in many diverse activities. For one, the institute works to provide training for legal professionals in the Arab and European world. In the same light, the institute engages in the specialised education of young academics and lawyers from around the world in the areas of International and European Criminal Law.

Involved in both scholarly and policy-oriented research, the institute produces publications on human rights, international criminal law, international humanitarian law, and post-conflict justice. The Siracusa International Institute has worked in the Middle East, Central and Eastern Europe and Central Asia, often in cooperation with the Italian Foreign Ministry.

== Projects ==
=== United Nations, the Council of Europe and other international organizations ===
The institute has undertaken a number of international initiatives, which have included committees of experts of the United Nations, the Council of Europe and the European Police Office (Europol), for the purpose of elaborating international instruments, and training seminars with the International Monetary Fund, the Basel Institute on Governance and the NATO School, among others. These initiatives include a number of activities related to the elaboration of the treaty establishing the International Criminal Court, the Rome Statute, and its Rules of Procedure and Evidence.

A number of international instruments have been elaborated at the institute. Those the United Nations adopted include:

- Principles on the Independence of the Judiciary and the Legal Profession
- Guiding Principles on Crime Prevention and Criminal Justice in the Context of Development
- Model Treaty on the Transfer of Prisoners
- Model Treaty on the Transfer of Criminal Proceedings
- Model Treaty on Extradition
- Model Treaty on Enforcement of Sentences

The institute also hosts expert meetings in cooperation with the Council of Europe and under the auspices of its Secretary-General. These activities with the Council of Europe include:

- The drafting of the Comprehensive Convention on International Cooperation in Criminal Matters
- A uniform curriculum for teaching the European Penal Conventions in European Universities
- Guidelines for the Protection of Cultural Heritage in Europe (with the participation of the European Parliament)
- Local self-government and the role of the municipal police
- Translation into Arabic and publication of the European Convention on Human Rights and its Protocols and the European Convention for the Prevention of Torture and Inhuman or Degrading Treatment or Punishment.

The Siracusa International Institute and the International Monetary Fund have co-ordinated an annual workshop in Syracuse on money laundering and countering the financing of terrorism. The workshop focuses on the exchange of experience, information and ideas between the numerous government officials from Central Asia and Eastern Europe that attend.

=== Technical cooperation and training seminars ===
The Institute has conducted over 40 technical cooperation and training seminars for judges and public officials from developing countries on the topics of organized crime, international cooperation in penal matters, extradition, and the protection of human rights in the administration of justice. These programs are conducted in collaboration with the United Nations, the Council of Europe, the League of Arab States, the Organisation of American States, and other international organisations.

Several thousand judges, prosecutors, government officials, researchers, lawyers, and scholars have attended these programs, including those for Egyptian Prosecutors, Judges, Police and Army Officers co-sponsored by the Italian Ministries of Foreign Affairs and Justice, Prosecutors, and several programs for Albanian and Macedonian judges, prosecutors, and police officers co-sponsored by the Italian Presidency of Council and Ministry of Justice, in cooperation with the Council of Europe and Europol. A similar program for African jurists involving more than 200 judges, prosecutors, academics, and lawyers was held.

=== Conferences and specialization courses ===
The institute regularly hosts international conferences of experts on subjects of contemporary interest to the international scholarly community, gathering the world's leading authorities and experts in criminal sciences. The Siracusa International Institute also organizes Specialization Courses in International Criminal Law for Young Penalists in collaboration with several Universities. Other Specialization Courses are organized for junior prosecutors and defence lawyers.

== Programs ==
The Siracusa International Institute is presently engaged in a number of technical assistance programs and research projects, which aim to significantly improve the rule of law in human rights and criminal law issues in conflict resolution and post conflict situations.

=== Afghanistan ===
The Afghanistan program, with which the Institute has been involved in since 2003, is directed towards the judicial and drugs sectors in Afghanistan. The program has seen the involvement of the Siracusa International Institute in the training of over 2,700 operators within the Afghan justice system and has been engaged with operators in the counter-narcotics system. In conjunction with the United Nations Office on Drugs and Crime, the Institute organized a workshop on law reform in Afghanistan in April 2008. In 2005, its president M. Cherif Bassiouni, as independent expert on human rights in Afghanistan to the UN, reported abuse by US forces and private military contractors, as well Afghan military and police forces.

=== Iraq ===
The Siracusa International Institute is also involved with projects aimed to improve the education and training available, to law students and government operators, in Iraq within the fields of criminal law and human rights law. The Institute has carried out some of these programmes in conjunction with the International Human Rights Law Institute. In 2007 the Institute compiled a set of guidelines and recommendations for a strategic, integrated plan for the future of Iraqi's Rule of Law, which was sponsored by the Office of the Prime Minister and all relevant Iraqi institutions.

=== Arab World ===
The Institute has been actively engaged in programmes directed towards the Arab World since 1979. The institute organises conferences and seminars for students, academics and practitioners in the legal field coming from the Arab World, with the goal of fostering international co-operation in matters of criminal and humanitarian law. In more recent years, the Siracusa International Institute has been engaged in a technical assistance program in support of the Bahrain Justice and Law Enforcement Sectors on the International Protection of Human Rights and the Enhancement of Investigatory and Prosecutorial Capabilities of the Office of the Attorney General and a parallel technical assistance program in Support of the Bahrain Ministry of Interior for Law Enforcement and Police Officers.

=== Macedonia ===
In 2006, the Institute provided technical support to a program co-ordinated by the Italian Ministry of Justice, the Public Prosecutor's Office of the Republic of Macedonia and the European Agency for Reconstruction. This project served to further develop and enhance the capacity of the Public Prosecutor's Office in helping with the establishment of a legal framework in line with EU standards, fostering the implementation of the rule of law, improving court procedures, tackling corruption and strengthening the independence, effectiveness and efficiency of the judiciary.

=== Fact-finding bodies ===
The research project on the "Establishment of Principles and Best Practices for International and National Commissions of Inquiry" highlighted the ad hoc nature of both international and national Commissions of Inquiry, and established the need to create a set of guidelines that would embody the collective experiences and lessons learned of past commissions. This research was presented at a Meeting of Experts which brought together a number of esteemed jurists, attorneys and scholars in the field of International Law as well as high-level United Nations and government officials, and presidents and prosecutors of the International Tribunals. It concluded with the publication of the 'Siracusa Guidelines for International, Regional and National Fact-Finding Bodies'.

=== Protecting Human Rights in North Africa ===
The project established a database of government, media and NGO reports and other public sources regarding events related to the conflict in Libya that began in March 2011. It also conducted a study compiling the history and context of the conflict, as well as providing a chronology and assessment of events which occurred, with a particular focus on allegations of human rights abuses by all involved parties. The purpose of the project was to supplement the work of the United Nations Commission of Inquiry (UN COI) on Libya and to provide a resource for the post-commission United Nations and ICC work. The project's final report was converted into a 1,000-page book, titled 'Libya: From Repression to Revolution'.

=== Post conflict justice ===
The Siracusa International Institute was engaged in a research project on the theme of post conflict justice, titled 'Fighting Impunity and Promoting International Justice'. The project created model guidelines for the implementation of post-conflict justice mechanisms that most appropriately and adequately address issues arising out of each post-conflict situation. The project comprised a number of regional and themed studies, carried out by a steering committee of experts, the results of which were disseminated in six regional conferences. This project was carried out in co-operation with the International Human Rights Law Institute, the Association Internationale de Droit Penal and the Irish Centre for Human Rights.

== Post-graduate fellows ==
The Siracusa International Institute offers one or two post-graduate resident fellowships per year. While in residence at the institute, the fellows involve themselves in activities of the institute, participate in the various conferences and seminars, and pursue an individual course of research. Some of the fellows have joined academia and are now professors, and others have pursued professional careers.

== Publications ==
The institute has published over 149 books related to the proceedings and studies that the Institute is and has been involved in over the years. Many of the publications are the result of meetings or conferences that have been hosted at the Institute's headquarters and feature contributions from some of the world's leading experts in criminal law and human rights issues.

== See also ==
- International criminal law
- United Nations
- International Criminal Court
