= Hospital gown (disambiguation) =

Hospital gown may refer to:

- Patient gown, clothing worn in a hospital by patients
- PPE gown, gowns worn by medical professionals

== See also ==
- Scrubs (clothing)
- Gowning
