= Cherokee Inc. =

US-based apparel and footwear company

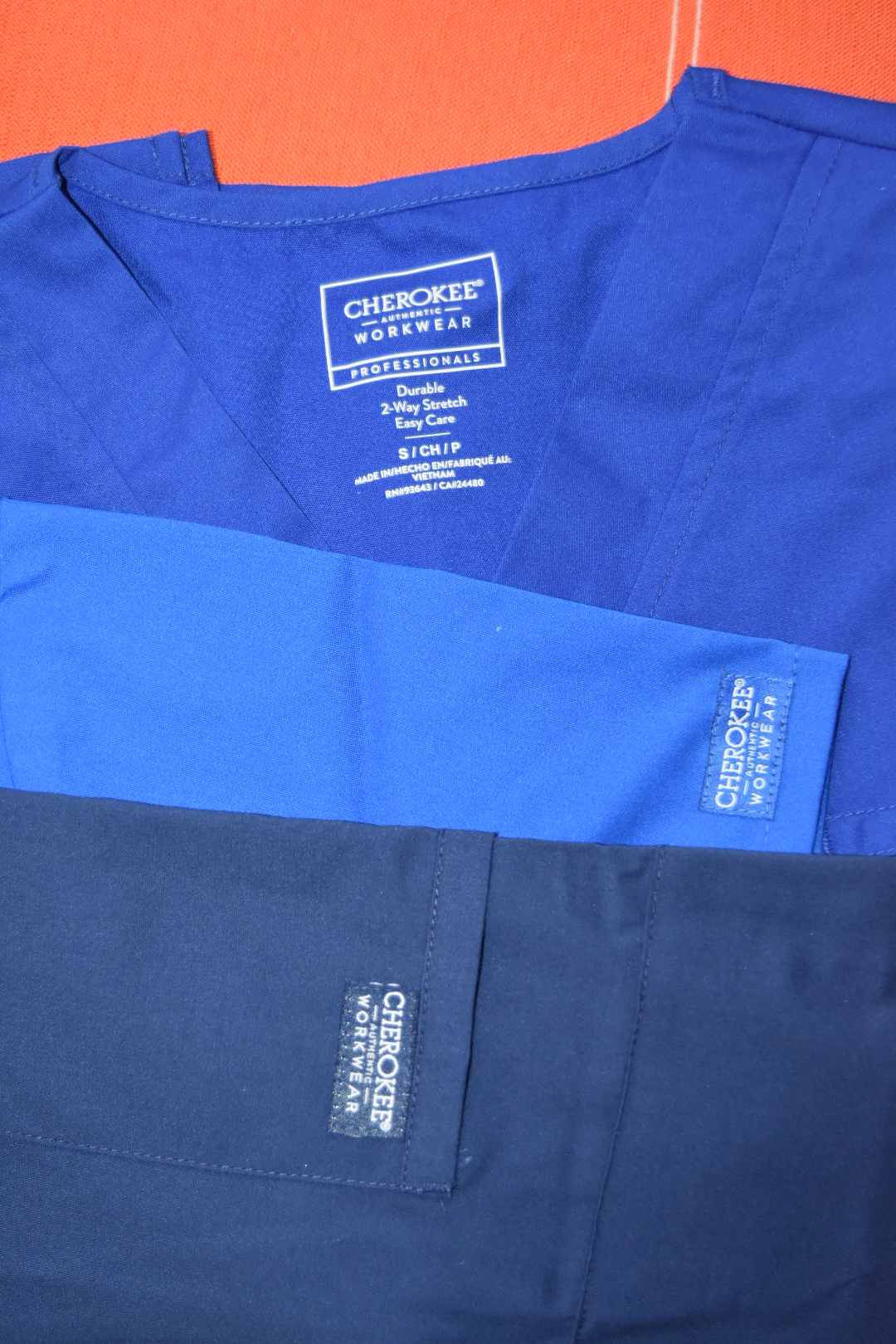
- Type: Public
- Industry: Manufacturing
- Founded: 1973; 53 years ago
- Founder: James Argyropoulos
- Headquarters: Sherman Oaks, California, United States
- Key people: Jess Ravich (Chairman); Henry Stupp (CEO); Howard Siegel (COO); Steven L Brink (CFO)
- Products: Clothing; Accessories; Shoes
- Parent: Galaxy Universal
- Subsidiaries: Hi-Tec
- Website: www.galaxycorp.com

Cherokee Inc., also known as Apex Global Brands, is an American-based global apparel and footwear company, headquartered in Sherman Oaks, California. The company was established in 1973 and its brands are available in 110 countries in 12,000 retail locations and on digital commerce.

Cherokee owns a number of fashion and lifestyle brands, including: Cherokee, Cherokee Workwear, Carole Little, Tony Hawk Signature Apparel and Hawk Brands, 900 Tony Hawk, Liz Lange, Sideout, Hi-Tec, Magnum, 50 Peaks, Interceptor, Everyday California, Point Cove, Saint Tropez, Chorus Line, All That Jazz, Ale by Allesandra, Teen Hearts and Flip Flop Shops.

== History ==
=== Founding ===
In 1973, James Argyropoulos, the son of a Greek immigrant, launched custom-made footwear designs and began selling them from his Venice Beach, California home. Soon the line was stocked by department stores, including Macy's and Bloomingdale's.

In the early 1980s, the brand expanded into women's and children's apparel. During this time, it became available worldwide.

In the 1990s, Cherokee established a partnership with Target.

The headquarters at Sherman Oaks, California employs 51-200 employees.

In 2021, Apex Global Brands was acquired by Galaxy Universal.

=== Filing for bankruptcy protection ===
It filed for Chapter 11 bankruptcy protection in both 1993 and 1994, but continued to trade.

=== Expansion ===
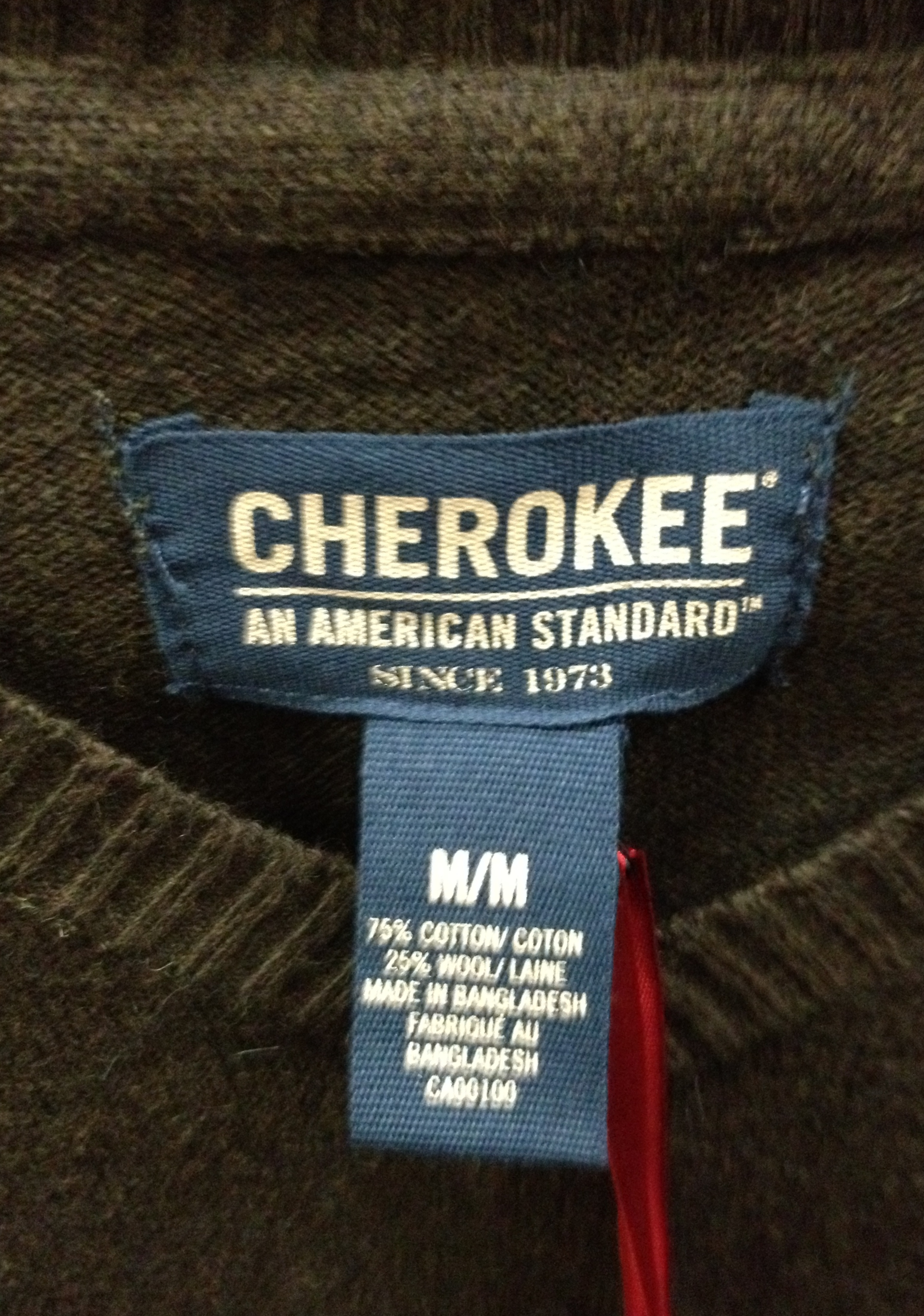
A Cherokee shirt tag at a Zellers in Quebec when the brand was being sold there

In 1997, the company acquired Sideout.

From 2002 until 2015, Cherokee was sold through Tesco in the United Kingdom, at which point Argos took over the brand's retail rights. However, following Sainsbury's 2016 acquisition of Argos, the Cherokee brand was dropped and replaced by Sainsbury's own Tu clothing line in 2017.

The company expanded further in December 2002 by acquiring the Carole Little, Saint Tropez, All That Jazz, and Chorus Line brands, alongside the CL Fashion trademarks.

In Canada, the label was originally sold by Zellers starting in 1998. It was later sold at Target Canada stores from 2013 to 2015, before being acquired by Sears Canada.

In January 2014, Cherokee acquired the worldwide Tony Hawk and Hawk signature apparel brands. It then acquired the casual lifestyle brand Everyday California in May 2015.

On September 10, 2015, Cherokee announced that Target would cease carrying the brand when its license expired on January 31, 2017. As of 2022, selected Target locations still carried Cherokee products, though on a non-exclusive basis.

In October 2015, Cherokee acquired Flip Flop Shops, a franchise retail chain offering flip-flops, casual footwear, and accessories. In November 2016, Cherokee acquired the Hi-Tec and Magnum brands.

== Operations ==
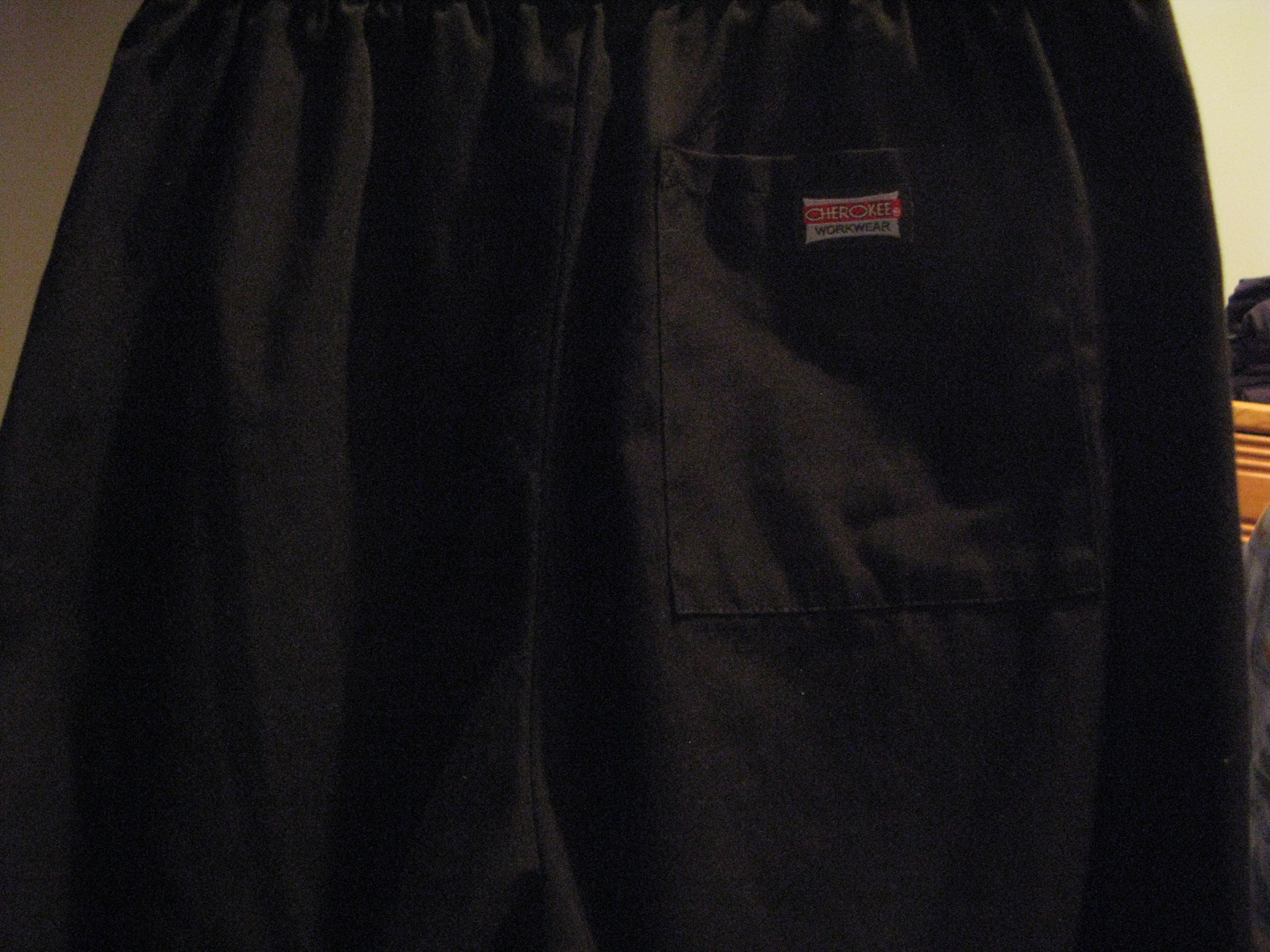
Back view of Cherokee Workwear drawstring pants

Cherokee comprises a number of fashion and lifestyle brands:

=== Cherokee ===
Cherokee is the core eponymous brand, licensed in over 50 countries.

=== Cherokee Workwear ===
Cherokee Workwear is a brand that was introduced in 2004, which manufactures medical scrubs.

=== Carole Little ===
The Carole Little collection comprises items for work, travel and leisure.

=== Tony Hawk Signature Apparel and Hawk Brands ===
Tony Hawk is an "action lifestyle" range.

=== 900 Tony Hawk ===
900 Tony Hawk is a skateboard brand.

=== Liz Lange ===
Liz Lange is a maternity wear brand.

=== Sideout ===
Sideout was founded in 1983 and comprises athletic wear, sportswear and active wear.

=== Hi-Tec ===
Hi-Tec is a privately held producer and distributor of sportswear and accessories, headquartered in the Netherlands.

=== Magnum ===
Magnum is a footwear brand.

=== 50 Peaks ===
50 Peaks is a brand which creates outdoor footwear, equipment and apparel.

=== Interceptor ===
Interceptor is a tactical boots brand.

=== Everyday California ===
Everyday California is a "casual style outfit" brand.

=== Point Cove ===
Point Cove is a Californian brand which sells clothing, footwear and accessories.

=== Saint Tropez ===
Saint Tropez is designed for younger women.

=== Chorus Line ===
Founded in 1975 by three men in southern California, Chorus Line is a moderately priced apparel company which initially begun as a retail company focusing exclusively on juniors collections. Chorus Line has branched out to include designs specifically aimed towards women in their 20s and 30s as well as petite and plus size divisions.

=== All That Jazz ===
All That Jazz appeals to a teenage female customer base and with low prices.

=== Flip Flop Shops ===
Flip Flop Shops was founded in 2004 and is a retail chain retailing popular brands and flip flops and casual footwear.

== See also ==
- Hi-Tec
- Tony Hawk
- Liz Lange
