= Kapit-Bisig Canada =

- Founded: 2020
- Type: Mutual aid (emergency services)
- Website: kapitbisig.ca

Kapit-Bisig Canada is a Canadian mutual aid network, initiated by BAYAN Canada member organizations such as Migrante Canada and Anakbayan Canada. It is a cooperative among over one hundred emergency response agencies in Vancouver, Calgary, Edmonton, Fort McMurray, Winnipeg, Toronto, Kitchener, Ottawa and Montreal. Kapit-Bisig coordinates the distribution of vital resources such as food, PPE, and essentials (e.g. diapers, over-the-counter medication, etc.) in short timeframes during the COVID-19 pandemic. Many recipients are migrant workers, undocumented, out-of-work or essential workers in low-wage jobs. Some have been left out of government assistance measures.

Kapit-Bisig Canada was formed in 2020 from its original name Kapit-Bisig Laban COVID Canada. Kapit-Bisig means "linking arms" in Tagalog.
