= PPE suit =

PPE suit may refer to:

- PPE gowns, a type of protective equipment largely used in clinical settings
- NBC suits, also known as CBRN suits, a type of specialist equipment used for protection from chemical, biological, radiological or nuclear contamination
