= Ribbon =

Long and narrow band of material

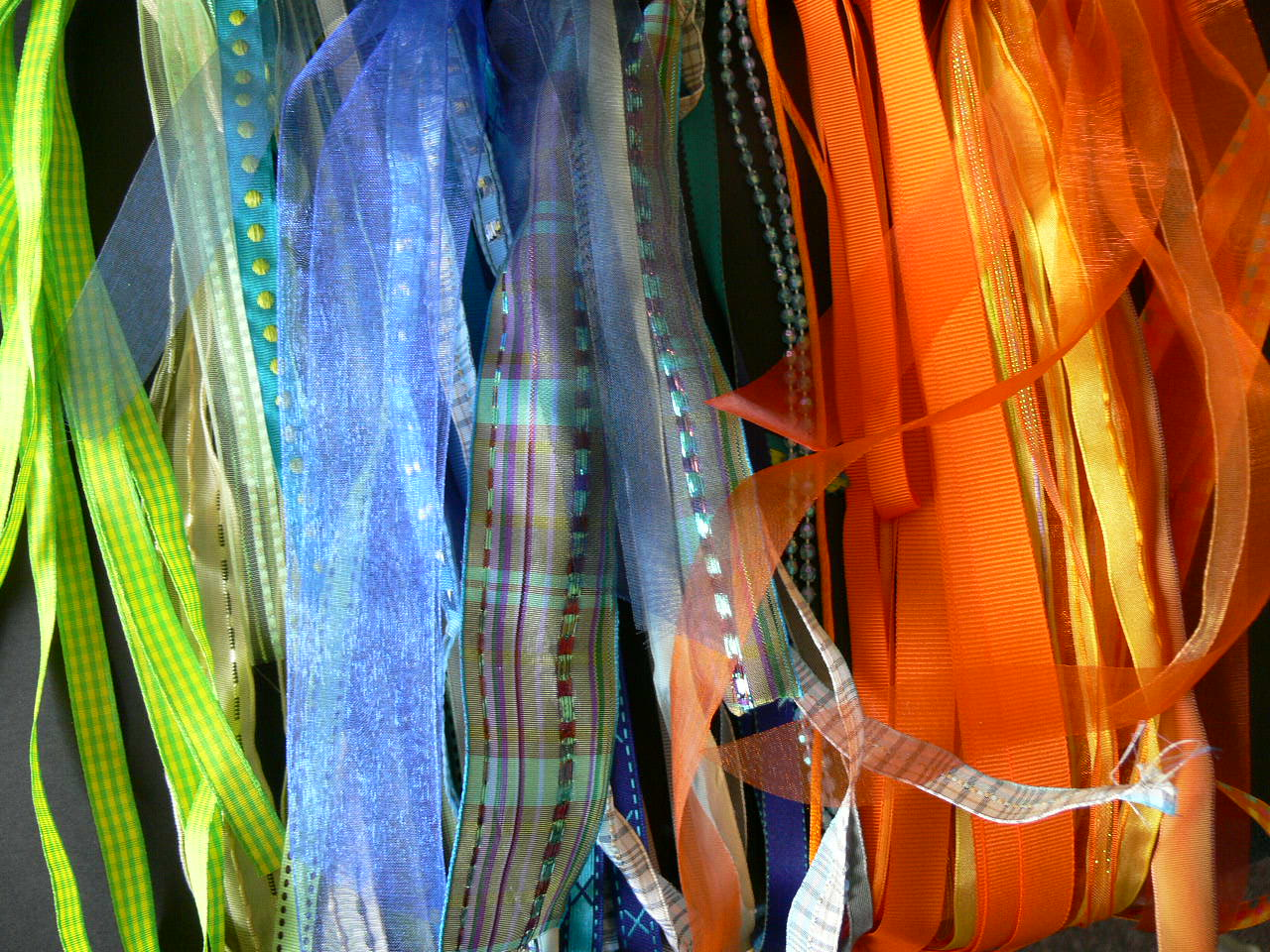
Ribbons

A ribbon is a thin band of material, typically cloth but also plastic or sometimes metal, used primarily as decorative binding and tying. Cloth ribbons are made of natural materials such as silk, cotton, and jute and of synthetic materials, such as polyester, nylon, and polypropylene. Ribbon is used for useful, ornamental, and symbolic purposes. Cultures around the world use ribbon in their hair, around the body, and as ornament on non-human animals, buildings, and packaging. Some popular fabrics used to make ribbons are satin, organza, sheer, silk, velvet, and grosgrain.

== Etymology ==
The word ribbon comes from Middle English ribban or riban from Old French ruban, which is probably of Germanic origin.

== Cloth ==
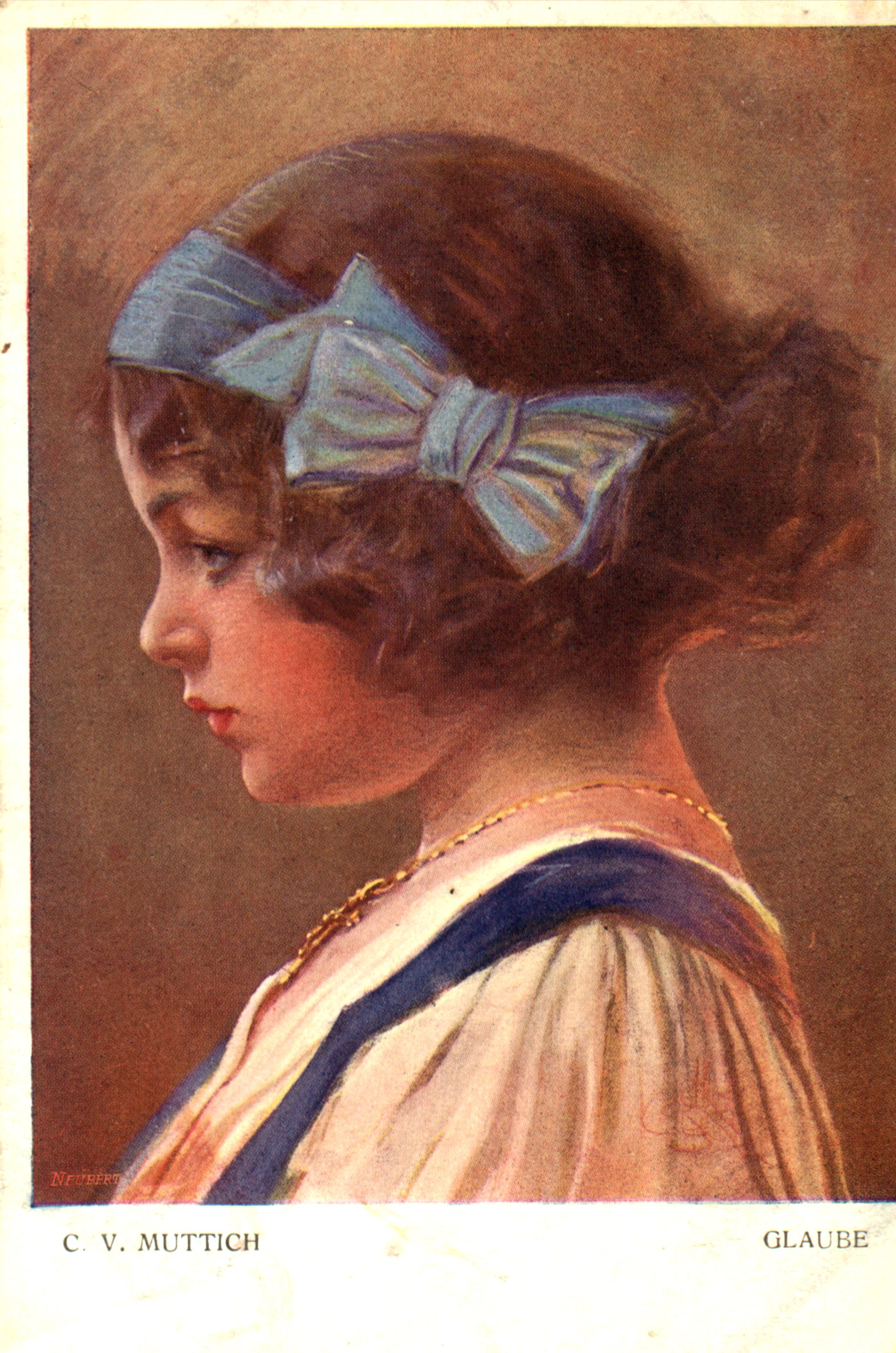
A hair ribbon

Along with that of tapes, fringes, and other smallwares, the manufacture of cloth ribbons forms a special department of the textile industries. The essential feature of a ribbon loom is the simultaneous weaving in one loom frame of two or more webs, going up to as many as forty narrow fabrics in modern looms. To affect the conjoined throwing of all the shuttles and the various other movements of the loom, the automatic action of the power-loom is necessary, and it is a remarkable fact that the self-acting ribbon loom was known and extensively used more than a century before the famous invention of Cartwright. A loom in which several narrow webs could be woven at one time is mentioned as having been working in Danzig towards the end of the 16th century. Similar looms were at work in Leiden in 1620, where their use gave rise to so much discontent and rioting on the part of the weavers that the states-general had to prohibit their use. The prohibition was renewed at various intervals throughout the century, and in the same interval the use of the ribbon loom was interdicted in most of the principal industrial centres of Europe. In 1676, under the name of the Dutch loom or engine loom, it was brought to London, and although its introduction there caused some disturbance, it does not appear to have been prohibited. In 1745, John Kay, the inventor of the fly-shuttle, obtained, conjointly with Joseph Stell, a patent for improvements in the ribbon loom. Since that period, it has benefited by the inventions applied to weaving machinery generally.

Ribbon-weaving is known to have been established near St. Etienne (dep. Loire) as early as the 11th century, and that town has remained the headquarters of the industry in Europe. During the Huguenot troubles, ribbon-weavers from St. Etienne settled at Basel, and there, established an industry which in modern times has rivalled that of the original seat of the trade. In the late 19th century a Frenchman known as C.M. Offray— himself from St. Etienne— moved his ribbon business to the United States and set up a company called "C.M. Offray & Sons, Inc" which went on to become a huge manufacturer of ribbons in North America.

While satin and other sorts of ribbon have always been used in lingerie, the usage of ribbon in the clothing industry, while subject to fashion trends, saw an upsurge in the mid to late 1990s. This upsurge led to increased ribbon manufacturing as well as new and improved manufacturing techniques. Due to more competitive production rates, as well as past experience in this field, companies in the Far East – especially those in China – gradually secured themselves to be the major ribbon suppliers in the world and improved both the quality and the variety of their merchandise to match those of their established European and North American competitors.

Presently, the North American continent remains the largest importer of ribbon and ribbon derivative products (such as bows, rosettes, and other garment accessories made from ribbon). However, due to outsourcing of production of garments by North American garment manufacturers, countries in Asia and South America have started to contribute to the change of the statistical figures of ribbon imports. Inspired by European silk ribbons obtained through trade, Great Lakes and Prairie Native American tribes created art form of appliqué ribbon work.

== For printers and typewriters ==
Typewriters and dot matrix printers use a cloth or plastic ribbon to hold the ink.

== Symbolism ==
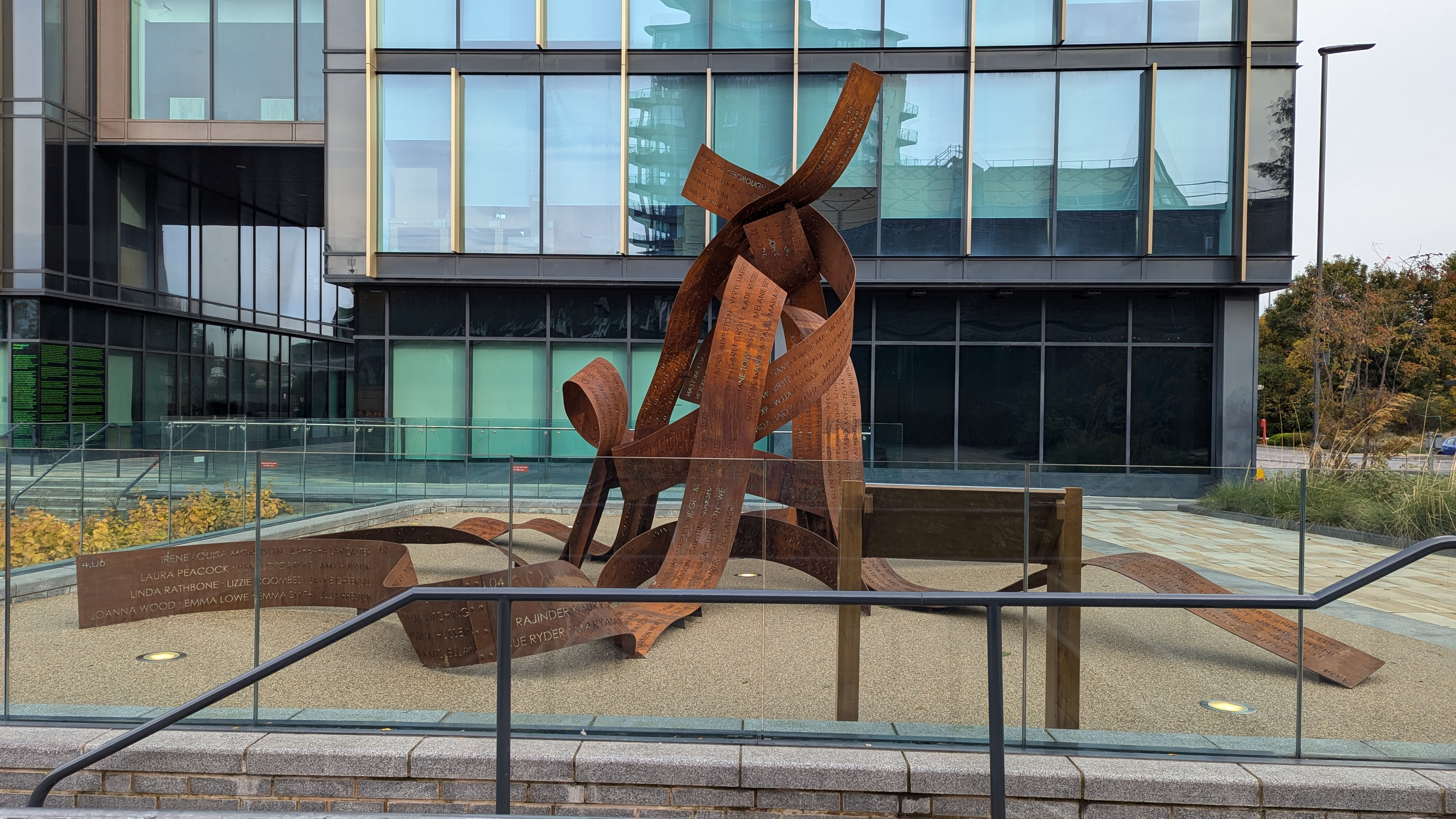
Ribbons sculpture by Pippa Hale

Awareness ribbons are pieces of ribbon used as symbols of support or awareness for various social causes. For example, the pink ribbon is used to symbolize breast cancer awareness and the yellow ribbon is used to symbolize a variety of issues, from supporting POWs to awareness of the 2011 Estonian cyclists abduction. Ribbons are used in some ceremonies, such as in an opening ceremony.

In Leeds, UK, the sculpture Ribbons by Pippa Hale uses them as a motif, since - according to Hale - they "... tie many parts together, so the idea is that we are binding the names of these women together over time and space in a celebration of womanhood."

== See also ==
- Award ribbon
- Awareness ribbon (e.g. Pink Ribbon)
- List of awareness ribbons
- Ribbon bar
- Ribbon cable
