= Plague doctor costume =

Clothing worn by plague doctors

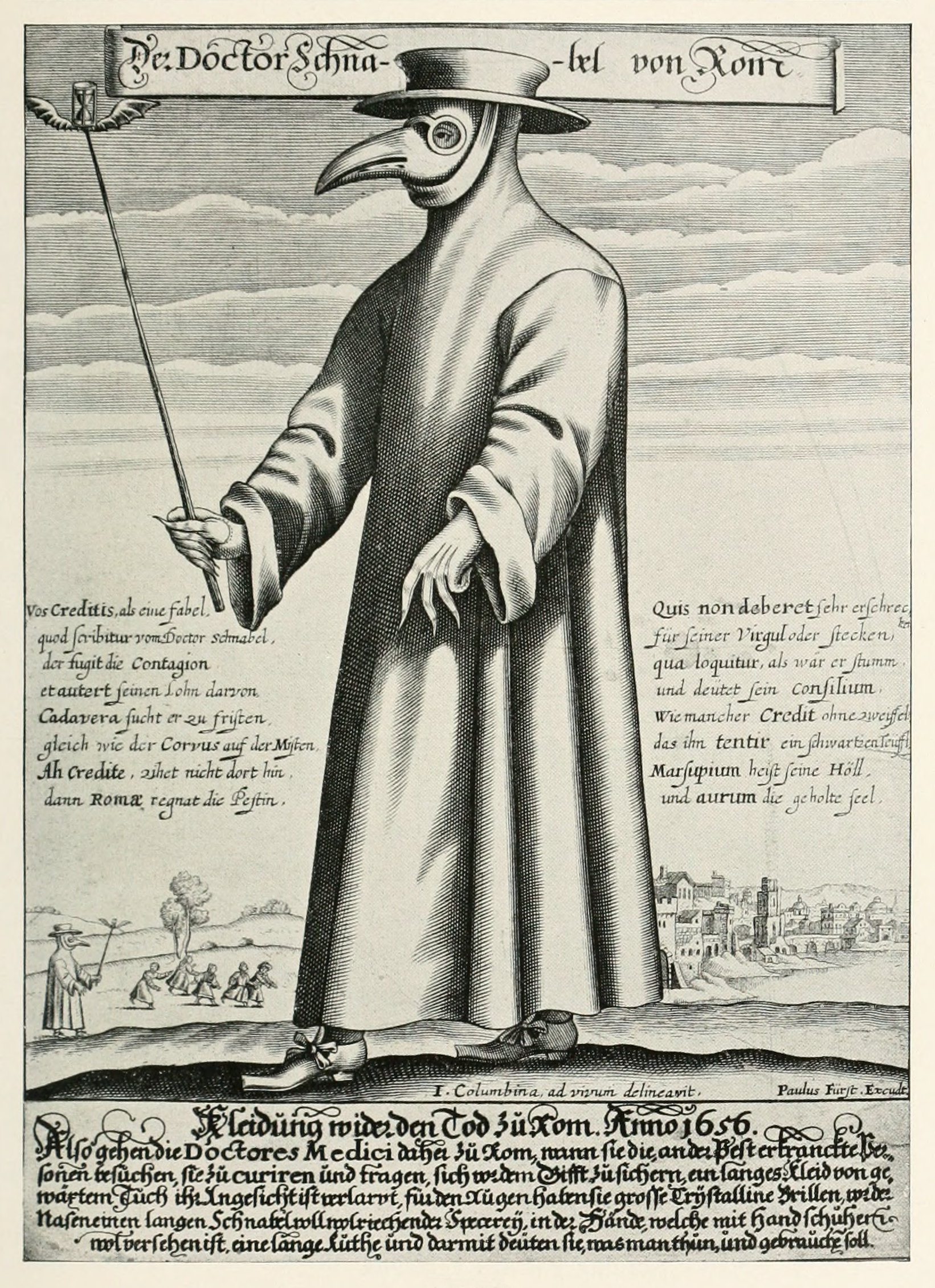
Paul Fürst, engraving, c. 1656, of a plague doctor of Rome (introduced as 'Dr Beak of Rome'). His nose-case is filled with herbal material, to keep off the plague.

The clothing worn by plague doctors was intended to protect them from airborne diseases during outbreaks of bubonic plague in Europe. It is often seen as a symbol of death and disease. Contrary to popular belief, no evidence suggests that the beak mask costume was worn during the Black Death or the Middle Ages. The costume started to appear in the 17th century when physicians studied and treated plague patients.

== Description ==
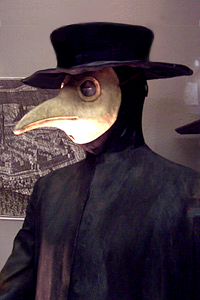
Plague doctor outfit from Germany (17th century)

The costume consists of a leather hat, mask with glass eyes and a beak, stick to remove clothes of a plague victim, gloves, waxed linen robe, and boots.

The typical mask had glass openings for the eyes and a curved beak shaped like a bird's beak with straps that held the beak in front of the doctor's nose. The mask had two small nose holes and was a type of respirator that contained aromatic items. The beak could hold dried flowers (commonly roses and carnations), herbs (commonly lavender and peppermint), camphor, or a vinegar sponge, as well as juniper berry, ambergris, cloves, labdanum, myrrh, and storax. The purpose of the mask was to keep away bad smells, such as the smell of decaying bodies. The smell taken with the most caution was known as miasma, a noxious form of "bad air." This was thought to be the principal cause of the disease. Doctors believed the herbs would counter the "evil" smells of the plague and prevent them from becoming infected. Though these particular theories about the plague's nature were incorrect, it is likely that the costume actually did afford the wearer some protection.

The garments covered the body, shielding against splattered blood, lymph, and cough droplets, and the waxed robe prevented fleas (the true carriers of the plague) from touching the body or clinging to the linen.

The wide-brimmed leather hat indicated their profession. Doctors used wooden canes in order to point out areas needing attention and to examine patients without touching them. The canes were also used to keep people away and to remove clothing from plague victims.

== History ==
The exact origins of the costume are unclear, as most depictions come from satirical writings and political cartoons. An early reference to plague doctors wearing masks is in 1373 when Johannes Jacobi recommends their use but he offers no physical description of what these masks looked like. The beaked plague doctor inspired costumes in Italian theater as a symbol of general horror and death, though some historians insist that the plague doctor was originally fictional and inspired the real plague doctors later. Depictions of the beaked plague doctor rose in response to superstition and fear about the unknown source of the plague. Often, these plague doctors were the last thing a patient would see before death; therefore, the doctors were seen as a foreboding of death.

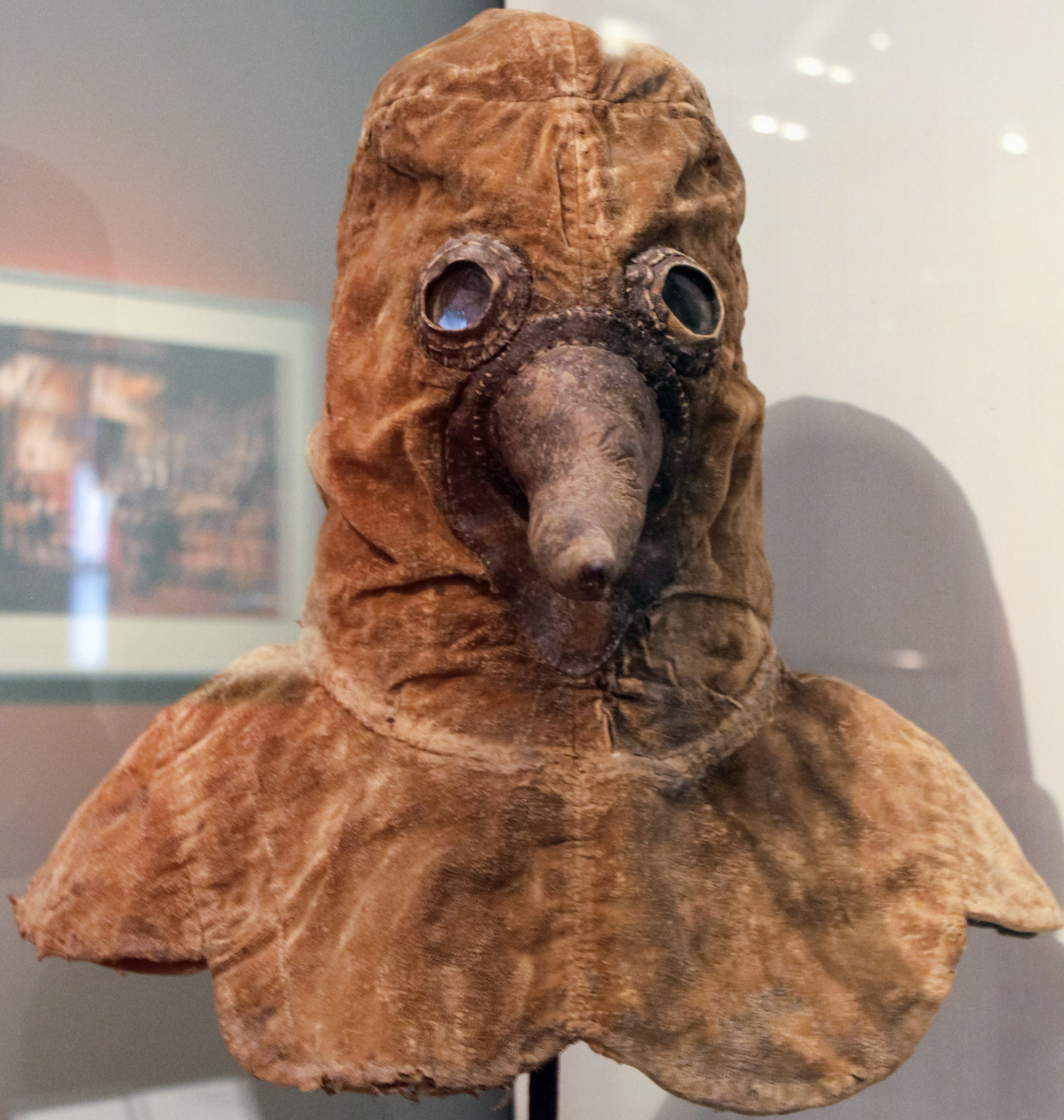
One of the only two known surviving plague masks; dated to between 1650 and 1750; held by the German Historical Museum, Berlin

The garments were first mentioned by a physician to King Louis XIII of France, Charles de Lorme, who wrote in a 1619 plague outbreak in Paris that he developed an outfit made of Moroccan goat leather, including boots, breeches, a long coat, hat, and gloves modeled after a soldier's canvas gown that went from the neck to the ankle. The garment was impregnated with similar fragrant items as the mask. De Lorme wrote that the mask had a "nose half a foot long, shaped like a beak, filled with perfume with only two holes, one on each side near the nostrils, but that can suffice to breathe and to carry along with the air one breathes the impression of the drugs enclosed further along in the beak." Recent research has revealed that strong caveats must be applied with regard to De Lorme's assertions, however. The Genevan physician, Jean-Jacques Manget, in his 1721 work Treatise on the Plague written just after the Great Plague of Marseille, describes the costume supposedly worn by plague doctors in Rome in 1656. The costume forms the frontispiece of Manget's 1721 work. Their robes, leggings, hats, and gloves were also made of Morocco leather. This costume was also worn by plague doctors during the Naples Plague of 1656, which killed 145,000 people in Rome and 300,000 in Naples. In his work Tractatus de Peste, published at Toulouse in May 1629, Irish physician Niall Ó Glacáin references the protective clothing worn by plague doctors, which included leather coats, gauntlets and long beak-like masks filled with fumigants.

There are only two known artifacts of plague masks, both dated to the 17th century and both found in Germany. Despite contemporaneous outbreaks in other regions such as Italy, there is no historical evidence of plague in central Europe that would correspond to these masks. The masks have glass over the eyes and curved leather "beaks". One mask has two small nose holes and may have been used as a type of respirator which contained aromatic plants or substances.

== Carnival ==
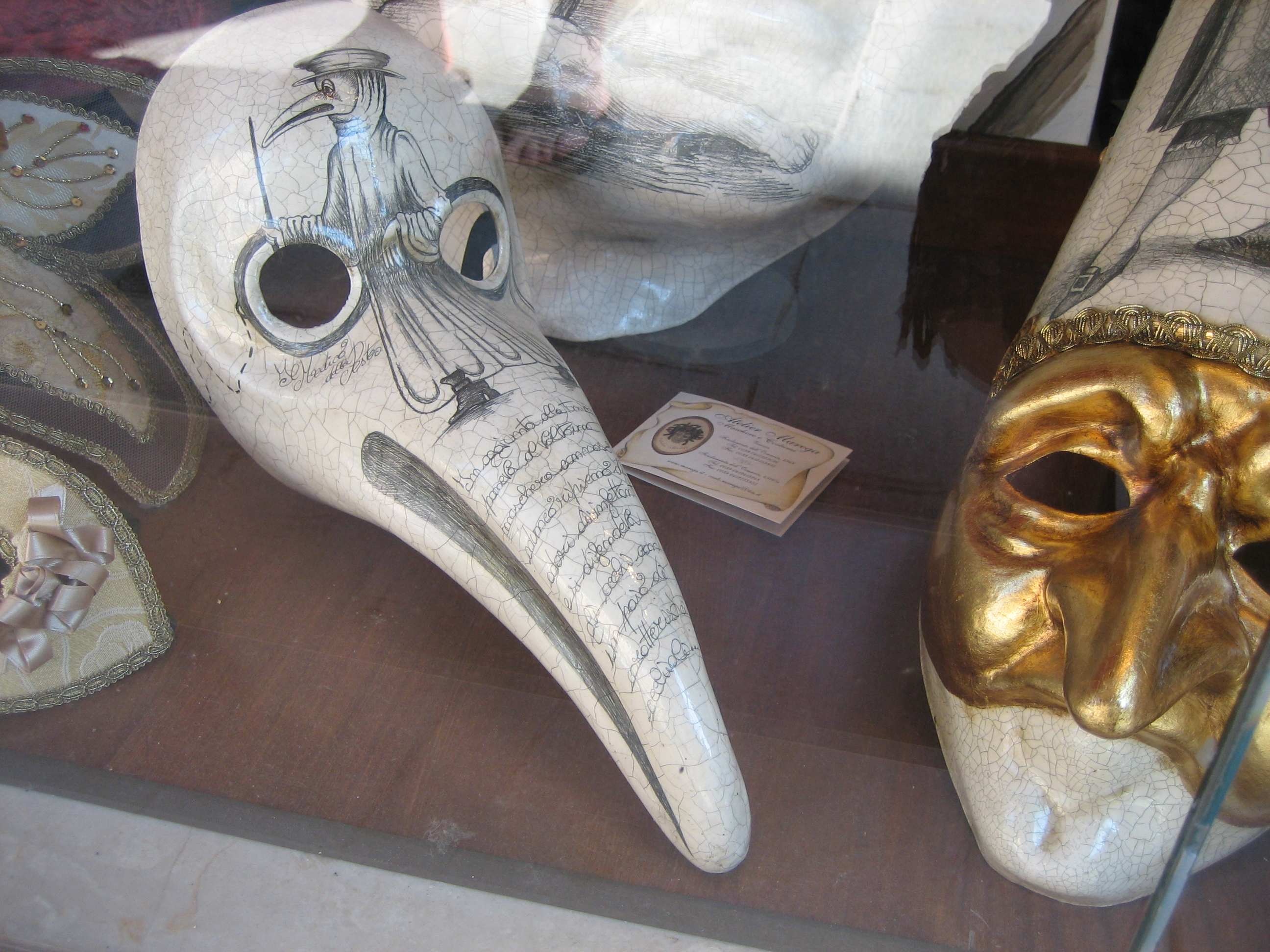
A beaked Venetian carnival mask bearing a picture of a plague doctor, and the inscription Il Medico della Peste ('The Plague Doctor') beneath the right eye

The costume is also associated with a commedia dell'arte character called Il Medico della Peste ('The Plague Doctor'), who wears a distinctive plague doctor's mask. The Venetian mask was normally white, consisting of a hollow beak and round eye-holes covered with clear glass, and is one of the distinctive masks worn during the Carnival of Venice.

== COVID-19 ==
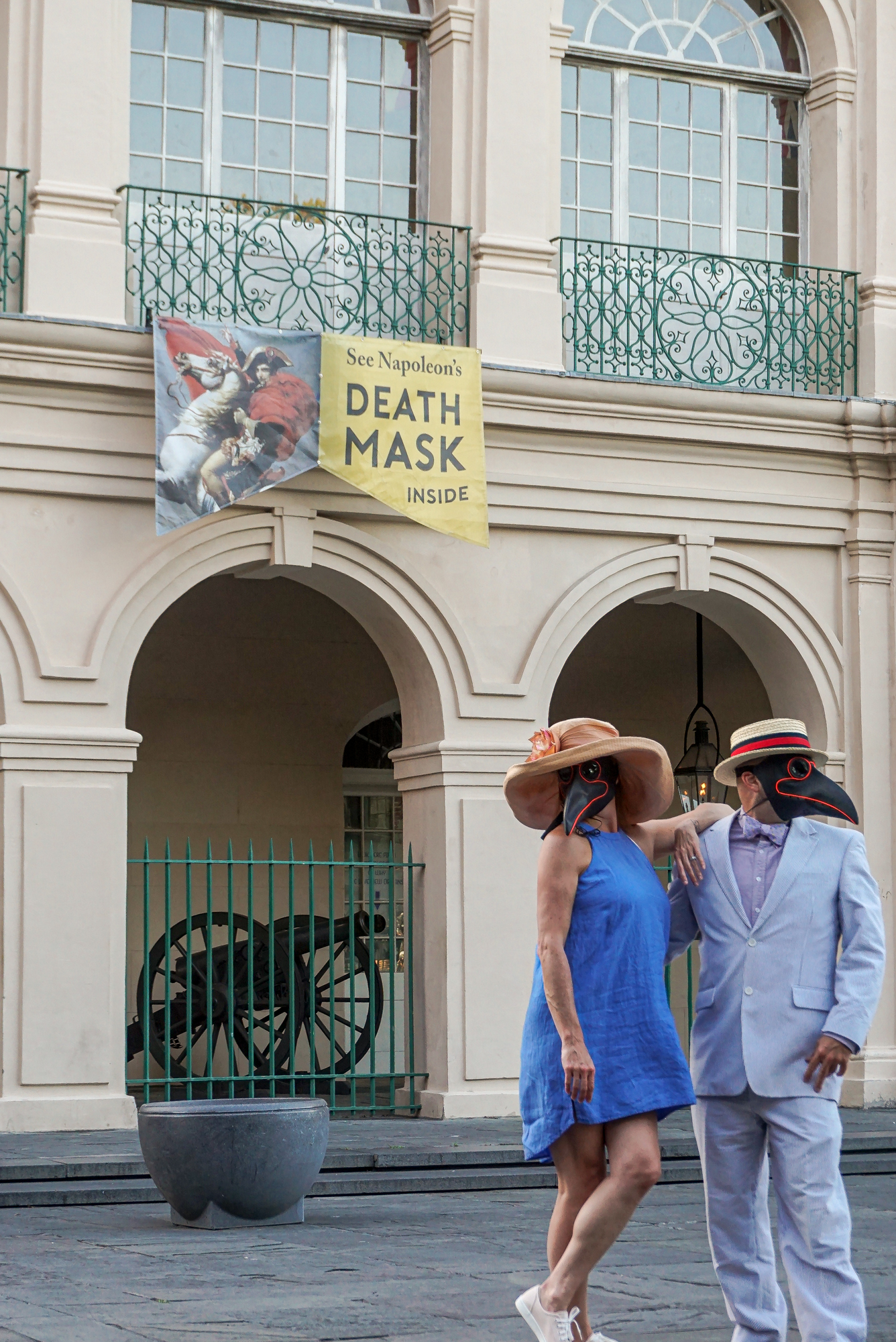
Posing with variations on plague masks in New Orleans during the April 2020 pandemic shutdown

During the COVID-19 pandemic beginning in 2020, the plague doctor costume grew in popularity due to its relevance to the pandemic, with news reports of plague doctor-costumed individuals in public places and photos of people wearing plague doctor costumes appearing in social media.

== See also ==
- Gas mask – Protection from inhaling airborne pollutants and toxic gases
- Hazmat suit – Protective suit against chemical, bacteriological, and nuclear risks
- Medical gown – Type of personal protective equipment worn by medical professionals
- N95 respirator – Particulate respirator meeting the N95 standard
- NBC suit – Type of military personal protective equipment
