= Hi-Tec =

Privately held producer and distributor of sportswear and accessories

Hi-Tec Sports
- Company type: Subsidiary
- Industry: Sportswear and accessories
- Founded: 1974
- Founder: Frank van Wezel
- Headquarters: Amsterdam, Netherlands
- Area served: Worldwide
- Key people: Frank van Wezel (Chairman); Ed van Wezel(CEO)
- Products: Sportswear, sports equipment
- Revenue: $250USD million
- Number of employees: 500
- Parent: Cherokee Inc.
- Website: www.hi-tec.com

Hi-Tec Sports, trading as Hi-Tec, is a privately held producer and distributor of sportswear and accessories, headquartered in the Netherlands.

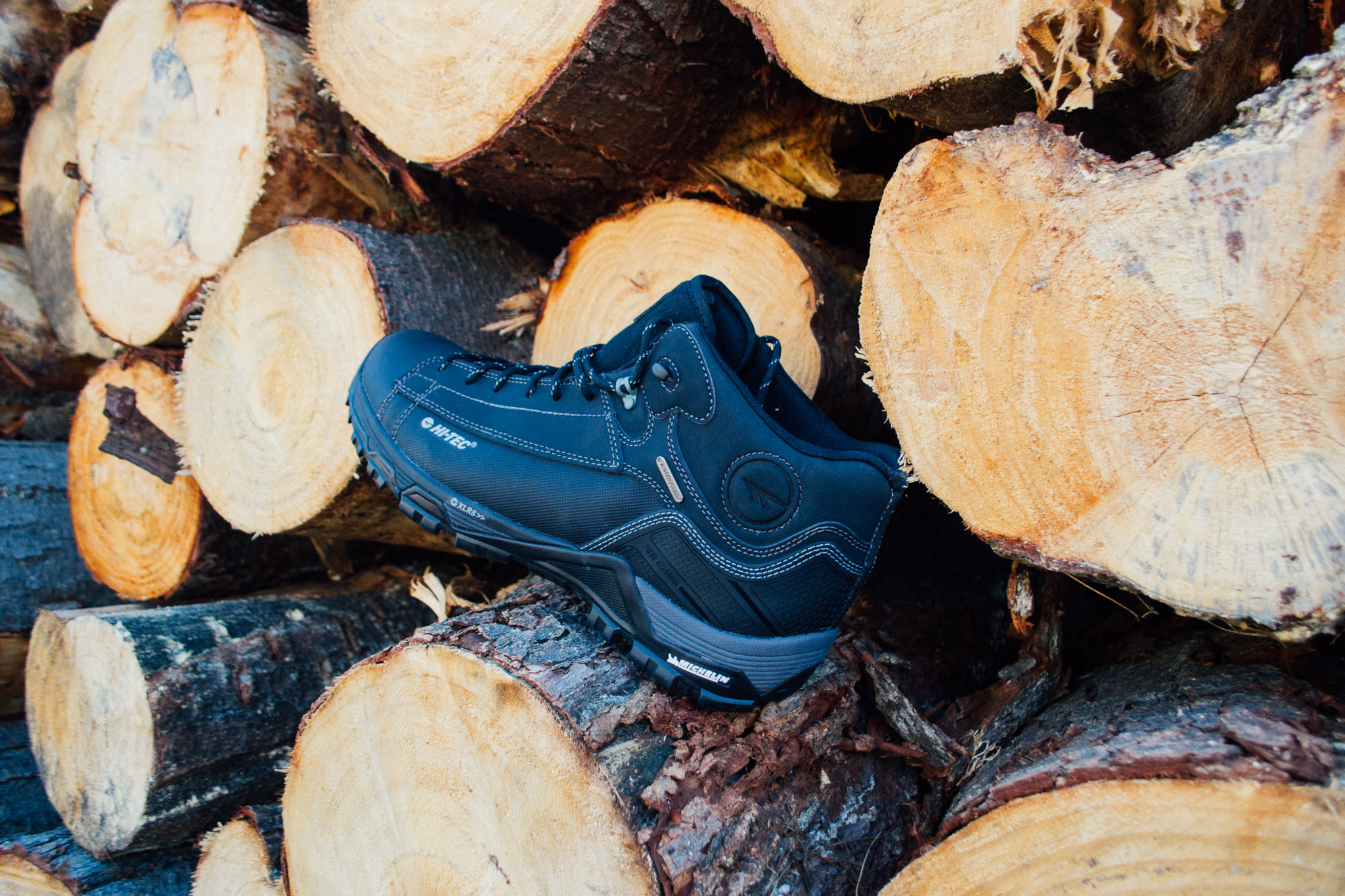
A Hi-Tec brand shoe

== History ==
Hi-Tec Sports was founded in 1974, in Shoeburyness, Essex, England, by Frank Van Wezel. The company moved its headquarters to Southend-on-Sea, before relocating its head office to Amsterdam.

Hi-Tec Sports USA was started in Modesto, CA in 1978 by Duke and Kathy Jones. They developed the first lightweight hiking boot. This became the main success of Hi-Tec Sports USA. They also developed and named the "Magnum" boot. Duke and Kathy Jones sold Hi-Tec Sports USA to Frank Van Wezel in 1990.

In 1988, the company was floated on the London Stock Exchange. Frank van Wezel bought the company back in 2000. It was privately held through 2013.

Production was in China until 2005, when Hi-Tec acquired the Falcon shoe factory in Lewiston, Maine, enabling them to offer made-in-usa branded products and compete for US Federal government contracts.

In 2013, Hi-Tec founder and chairman Frank van Wezel, was awarded an Honorary Degree of Doctor of Business Administration by Anglia Ruskin University.

In 2016, it was acquired by Cherokee Inc., later known as Apex Global Brands.

== Awards ==
In 2012, Hi-Tec's V-Lite Altitude Ultra Luxe boot received a Which? Best Buy Walking Boot award.

Hi-Tec's ZUUK trainer shoe was awarded Footwear Product of the Year 2013 at The Great Outdoors Awards.

The UK based Hi-Tec office was announced Sports Footwear Brand of the Year 2014 and Outdoor Footwear Company of the Year 2013 at the Footwear Industry Awards.
