= Twill tape =

Flat fabric tape used in sewing and tailoring

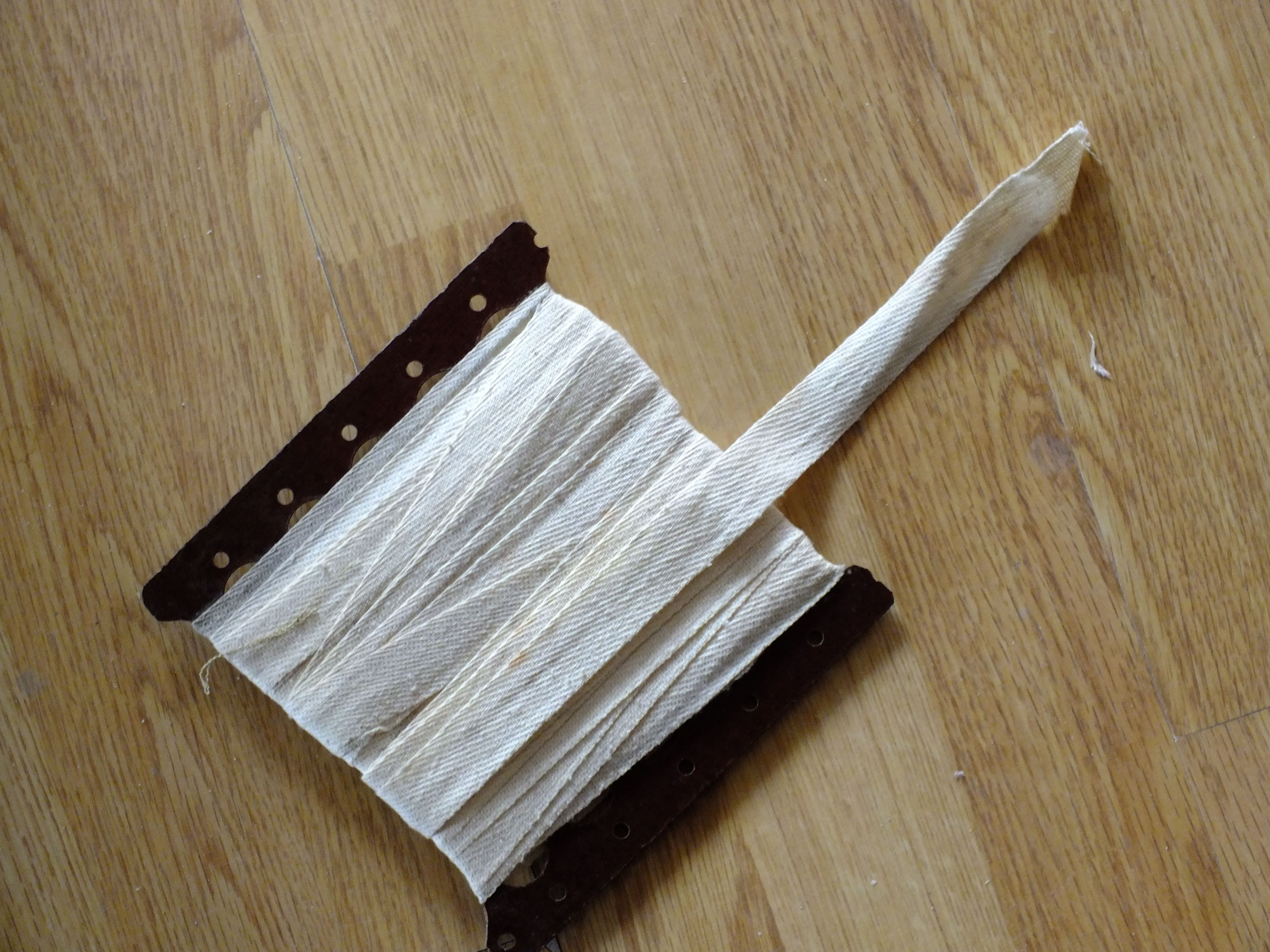
Twill tape

Twill tape or twilled tape is a flat herringbone twill-woven fabric tape or ribbon of cotton, linen, polyester, or wool. It may be used in sewing and tailoring to reinforce seams, make casings, bind edges, and make sturdy ties for closing garments (for example, on hospital gowns). Twill tape is used in theatre to tie curtains, cable and scenery to various objects, or to tie cable coils so that they do not unroll. It is also used in museums to secure flat or rolled materials for long-term storage.
