= Drawstring pants =

Type of garment

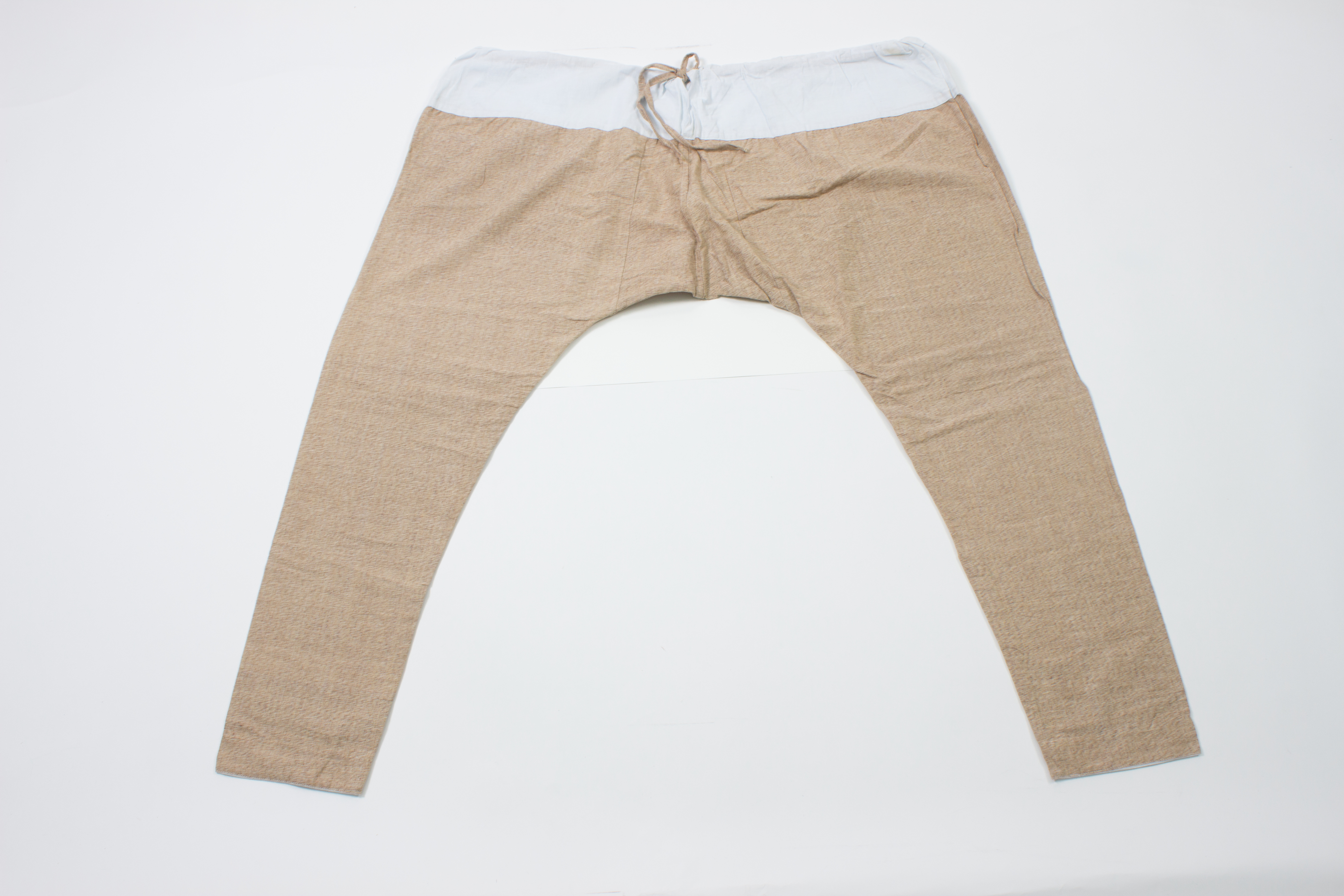
National dress of Nepal

Drawstring pants are pants that have a drawstring at the waist that allows for an adjustable fit. Often the pants are made of lightweight, breathable material and are popular for their ease of wear and versatility.

== Background ==
Drawstring pants are used with patient gowns or scrubs. They are also used in traditional clothing like the dashiki, kaftan, or the Daura-Suruwal. They are also part of the Brazilian jiu-jitsu gi.

== See also ==
- Kinchaku
