= Patient gown =

Garment worn by patients in a hospital

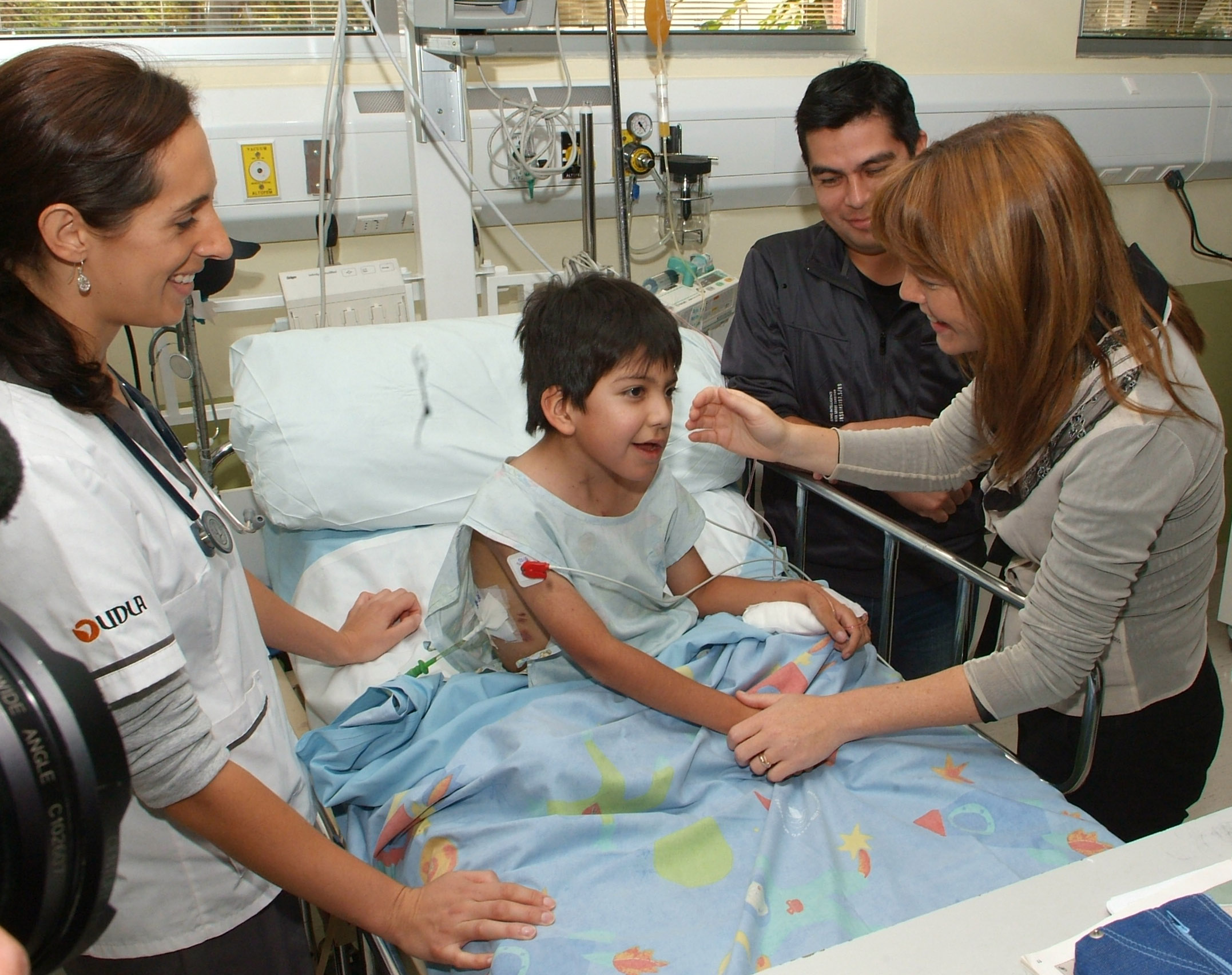
Hospital gown worn by a young patient.

A hospital gown, sometimes called a johnny gown or johnny, especially in Canada and New England, is "a long loose piece of clothing worn in a hospital by someone doing or having an operation". It can be used as clothing for bedridden patients.

== Utility ==
Hospital gowns worn by patients are designed so that hospital staff can easily access the part of the patient's body being treated.

The hospital gown is made of fabric that can withstand repeated laundering in hot water, usually cotton, and is fastened at the back with twill tape ties. Disposable hospital gowns may be made of paper or thin plastic, with paper or plastic ties.

Some gowns have snaps along the top of the shoulder and sleeves, so that the gown can be removed without disrupting intravenous lines in the patient's arms.

Hospital gowns used in psychiatric care will sometimes use snaps in the back instead of ties.

Used paper hospital gowns are associated with hospital infections, which could be avoided by proper disposal.

A Canadian study surveying patients at five hospitals determined 57 percent could have worn more clothing below the waist, but only 11 percent wore more than a gown. The physicians conducting the survey said gowns should not be required unless they are necessary. Although they are cheaper and easier to wash, Todd Lee, of Royal Victoria Hospital in Montreal, said gowns are not necessary unless the patient is incontinent or has an injury in the lower body. Otherwise, Lee said, pajamas or regular clothes may be acceptable.

== Problems and redesign ==
Traditional hospital gowns were designed around 1910, when patients spent most of their hospital stays confined to bed. These gowns were designed for the primary use of bedpans, with the open back of hospital gowns also proved beneficial as it made dressing and undressing patients far easier for hospital staff and facilitated the use of a bedpan. Such advantages have become less salient over time as medical practices change to emphasize getting patients out of bed and mobile rather than encouraging prolonged bed rest. When upright and moving, the open back of a hospital gown exposes the buttocks and prevents the gown from retaining warmth, resulting in some patients experiencing embarrassment and discomfort while wearing them.

Some studies have been done on updating the garment for more modern needs. However, new-style gowns and other types of clothing can be more expensive. The Valley Hospital in Ridgewood, New Jersey reported a $70,000 a year increase.

=== Luke's Fast Breaks ===
When 9-year-old Luke Lange complained about wearing a hospital gown while being treated for Hodgkin lymphoma, his mother adapted some T-shirts for him to wear, using snap tape on the sides. Other children saw the t-shirt and wanted one too. Two years later, the organization Luke's FastBreaks had raised $1 million for children's cancer and given out over 5,000 of the t-shirts. They were long enough to wear like the gowns, but some preferred to wear them like t-shirts. Briton Lynn, executive director of Luke's FastBreaks, said the t-shirts helped children have a more positive attitude.

=== Traci Lamar design ===
In November 2006, Robert Wood Johnson Foundation gave a $236,000 grant to a team at North Carolina State University to design a new gown based on "style, cost, durability, comfort, function" and other qualities. NCSU professor Lamar's team worked to come up with a "more comfortable, less revealing" design. Surveys found that nurses did not like the ties in the back because knots could form, and some patients wore more than one gown at once, with one tied in front and the other in back. Many patients disliked how lightweight gowns were. In April 2009, the NCSU team showed potential new designs at a reception, and they were preparing to ask for more funding as they developed a prototype. Meanwhile, some hospitals were offering alternatives, including gowns that opened in the front or on the side, and drawstring pants, cotton tops and boxers. These cost more than traditional gowns. Lamar's additional funding came from RocketHub. At NCSU Fashion Week in 2013, Lamar's design was mentioned as "functional and dignified," but not shown "to prevent any patent infringements". A prototype, made of DermaFabric and made at Precision Fabrics in Greensboro, North Carolina, was to be tested at WakeMed.

=== DCS gown ===
In 2009, Fatima Ba-Alawi was honored for her DCS (dignity, comfort, safety) gown at a RCN conference on London. Four years after she started using her skills making dresses to redesign hospital gowns, NHS trusts were using the design. The reversible gowns have plastic poppers which make it easier to change without moving the patient and save staff time, and side pockets for drips or catheters, along with a pouch for cardio equipment. One version called the Faith Gown has a detachable head scarf and long sleeves.

=== Ben de Lisi design ===
Another redesign in England came from Ben de Lisi, one of six receiving grants. The Design Council was scheduled to show his design, which did not open in the back but did allow access, in March 2010.

According to the BBC, de Lisi's hospital gowns are made much more modestly, taking patient dignity into consideration.

=== Cleveland Clinic design ===
The Cleveland Clinic changed its gowns in 2010 because the CEO had heard many complaints. Diane von Furstenberg was commissioned to design stylish hospital gowns based on her fashionable wrap dress by the Cleveland Clinic. The new design was reversible with a V-neck in both the front and the back, with softer fabric.

=== Dignity Giving Suit ===
Birmingham Children's Hospital in England introduced the polyester/cotton Dignity Giving Suit in March 2013, after 18 months of work. Patients and health care professionals liked the suits with Velcro fasteners on the seams. Other area hospitals were interested. Adults wanted the gowns to be made for them as well as children.

=== Janice Fredrickson ===
A design patented in 2014 by Janice Fredrickson had a side opening and sleeve openings, and could be put on without the patient sitting up. One version had pockets for telemetry wires and for drainage bags. It was suggested that different colors be used for different patients, such as those at risk of falling.

=== Model G design ===
In 2015, Henry Ford Health System of Detroit was working on its own design, similar to a bathrobe with cotton blend. In tests, patients liked the new design. But any update was likely to cost more, as well as harder to take care of. The Model G design, to be made by Carhartt of Michigan, used snaps on the front and shoulders.

=== KickIt adaptive design ===
In 2020, Cindy Trice, a cervical cancer survivor, designed KickIt to offer alternative clothing options that prioritize comfort and ease of access during medical care. After multiple hospitalizations with uncomfortable catheters, chemotherapy and radiation therapy, she conceptualized the idea of snap sleeves up the hospital gown arm, extending that feature beyond hospital gowns to hospital pajamas as well.

== See also ==
- Adaptive clothing
- Gown
- Locking clothing
- Scrubs (clothing)
