= Liz Lange =

Designer, Entrepreneur

- Born: Elizabith Steinberg; New York City, US
- Education: Brown University
- Occupations: Businessperson, fashion designer
- Relatives: Saul Steinberg (uncle)
- Website: instagram.com/lizlangeofficial/

Liz Lange is an American fashion designer and businessperson. She is the creative director and CEO of Figue, and the founder of Liz Lange Maternity, which introduced form-fitting designer pregnancy wear in 1998. Lange has been called a pioneer in the apparel industry.

== Early life and education ==
Lange grew up in New York City. She attended college at Brown University, where she earned a bachelor's degree in comparative literature in 1988.

== Career ==
From 1989 through 1993, Lange worked as a staff writer at Vogue, where she developed an interest in fashion. After leaving the magazine, she briefly interned for Stephen Di Geronimo's Geronimo label, and ultimately became a partner. While there, she began developing her idea for maternity clothes. In a 2005 interview with Business Week, Lange said: "I had all these pregnant friends come visit me and try to squeeze themselves into nonmaternity designer clothes. They all complained they couldn't find anything regular and stylish to wear – and that everywhere the outfits were either oversized or too frilly, which didn't look appropriate at work. I also noticed that, as they squeezed into these clothes, they looked better even though the outfits weren't quite big enough, just because the clothes were better designed. That was my aha! moment."

In 1997, Lange borrowed $50,000 from family and founded Liz Lange Maternity in a 12x12 office equipped with only a phone. In 1998, after contacting friends she believed would be interested in the clothing, Lange opened an 800 square foot store in Manhattan's midtown. The company quickly outgrew the space and moved to Madison Avenue in 2000. She later opened flagship stores in Beverly Hills, and in Greenville, on Long Island in New York. Creating high-end clothing that hugged rather than tented pregnant women, Lange's clothing attracted early attention from the fashion press, who described Liz Lange Maternity as the first "designer maternity wear."

After early coverage in The New York Times and Vogue, which praised the silhouette of the line, Lange began dressing pregnant celebrities, including Cate Blanchett, Cindy Crawford, Mariska Hargitay, Gwyneth Paltrow, Julia Roberts, Kelly Ripa, Brooke Shields, Kate Winslet, and Reese Witherspoon.

In August 2001, Lange signed an exclusive deal with Nike to introduce a line of athletic wear for pregnant women. In September of the same year, Lange was invited to unveil the line at New York Fashion Week. The first ever runway show by a maternity designer during Fashion Week, the event was scheduled to take place at 9:00 a.m. on September 11. It was immediately halted after the 9/11 terrorist attacks.

In 2002, Lange began a collaboration with Target and created a secondary line, Liz Lange for Target. Sold in-store and online, Liz Lange for Target is the retailer's sole offering in maternity apparel.

In 2007, Lange sold a majority stake in Liz Lange Maternity to private-equity fund Bluestar Alliance. Two years later, she joined Stefani Greenfield on Home Shopping Network (HSN) with limited-edition Liz Lange Designs for Curations. The collection sold out quickly, and inspired Lange to create an exclusive women's wear line for the network, Completely Me by Liz Lange, which was introduced in 2010.

Lange founded the website shopafrolic.com in 2009 with her sister, Jane Wagman. She wrote Liz Lange's Maternity Style: How to Look Fabulous During the Most Fashion-Challenged Time, published in 2003.

In 2012, Liz Lange Maternity and the Completely Me brands were bought by Cherokee Inc. for $14 million. Lange remains involved as the creative director and "the face" of the brand.

Lange is the CEO and creative director of Figue, a dress brand she acquired in December 2020. Lange is also the star of the Sony podcast, The Just Enough Family.

== Personal life ==
Lange, an advocate for cancer prevention and treatment, was diagnosed with cervical cancer at age 35. She underwent a hysterectomy, radiation treatment, and chemotherapy and spoke publicly about her illness with publications including People and USA Today. In 2013, she received the Spirit of Achievement Award from the Albert Einstein College of Medicine at Yeshiva University.

Lange has two children, Gus and Alice, and lives in Manhattan and in East Hampton, at the Grey Gardens estate. The setting of the 1975 documentary Grey Gardens, it was purchased by Lange in 2017.

She is the niece of businessman Saul Steinberg.
