= Claudius Marie Offray =

French-born American ribbon designer and manufacturer

Claudius Marie "C.M." Offray (12 September 1859 – 5 July 1938) was a French-born American designer and manufacturer of ribbons during the late 19th and early 20th centuries. Offray came to the United States in 1885 from the ribbon-center of France, Saint-Étienne near Lyon, and founded his company, C.M. Offray and Sons, Inc. in 1876. As of 1988, Offray & Son Inc. was the largest manufacturer of ribbon in the world. The business was merged in 2002 with competitor Berwick Industries to create the name "Berwick Offray".

Offray & Sons Inc. was chosen four times—in 1980, 1984, 1988, and 1996—to provide the ribbons used by medal winners in the Olympic Games.

He died while on vacation in Skytop, Pennsylvania.
