= Scrubs (clothing) =

Lightweight, washable clothing worn by hospital staff or other medical personnel

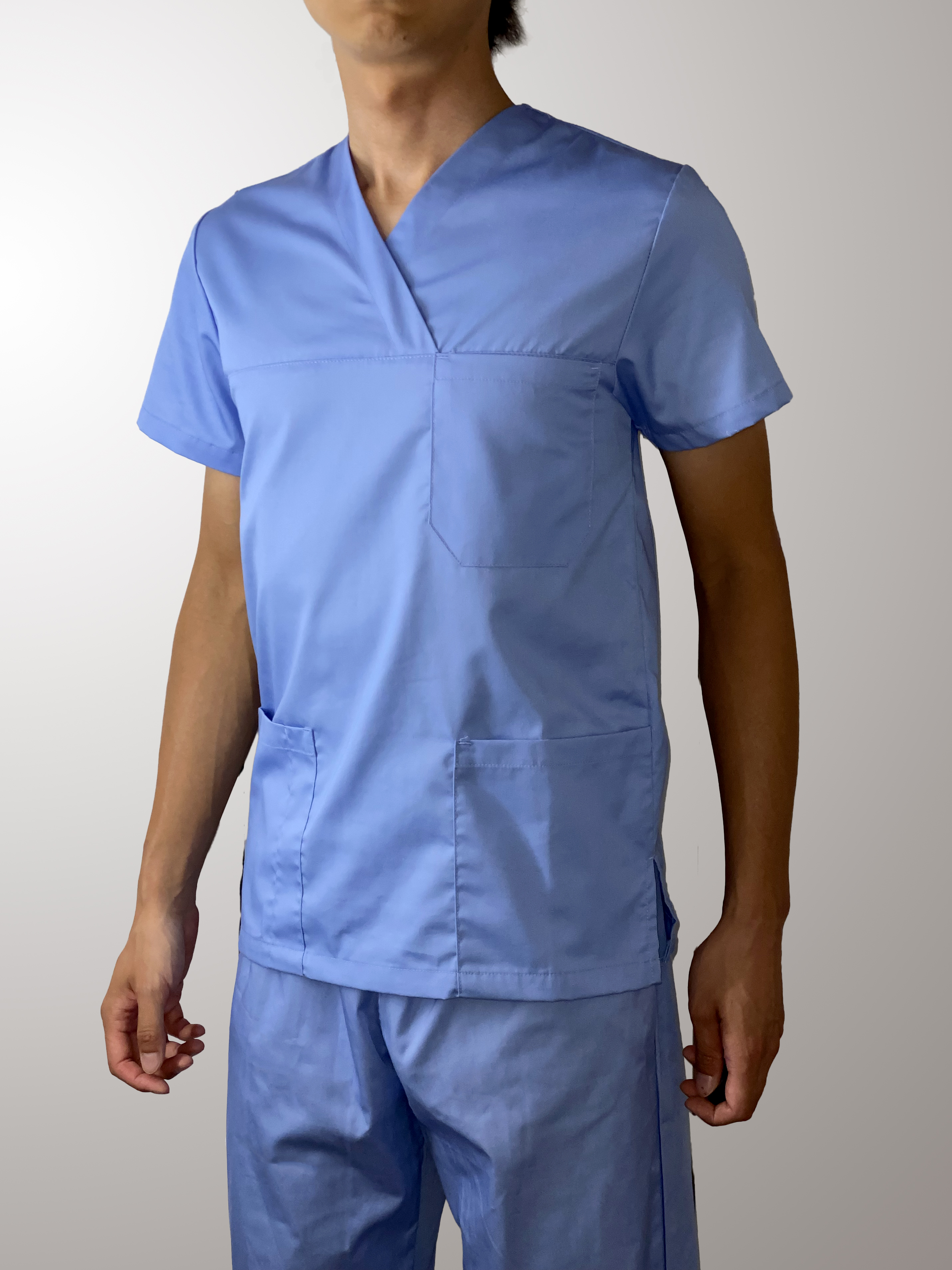
A light blue set of scrubs.

Scrubs, sometimes called surgical scrubs or nursing scrubs, are the sanitary short-sleeved workwear worn by physicians, nurses, dentists and other healthcare workers involved in patient care. Originally designed for use by surgeons and other operating room personnel, who would put them on when sterilizing or "scrubbing in" before gowning up for surgery, they are now worn by many hospital personnel due to the ease of changing. Their use has been extended outside hospitals as well, to work environments where clothing may come into contact with infectious agents (veterinarians, midwives, etc.).

A standard scrubs set includes a T-shirt and a pair of sweatpants, the latter with an elastic waistband and/or a knot-fastened girdle. They are designed to be simple (with minimal harbouring sites for contaminants), easy to launder, and cheap to replace if damaged or stained irreparably. In the United Kingdom, scrubs are sometimes known as theatre blues due to the typical blue or dark green colorings which minimize afterimages when seen by others.

The spread of methicillin-resistant Staphylococcus aureus (MRSA) has increased the use of scrubs but can give wearers a false sense of security that they are "clean" when in fact they are as easily contaminated as any other clothing.

== History of surgical attire ==
In contrast to the uniforms long required of nurses, surgeons did not wear any kind of specialized garments until well into the 20th century. Surgical procedures were conducted in an operating theater. The surgeons wore their own clothes, with perhaps butcher's aprons to protect their clothing from blood stains, and they operated bare-handed with non-sterile instruments and supplies. (Gut and silk sutures were sold as open strands with reusable hand-threaded needles; packing gauze was made of sweepings from the floors of cotton mills.)

In contrast to today's concept of surgery as a profession that emphasizes cleanliness and conscientiousness, up to the early 20th century the mark of busy and successful surgeons was the profusion of blood and fluids on their clothes. The importance of dress as a badge of one's class in society was paramount and the processes behind the transmission of infection were the subject of controversy within the profession.

With the "Spanish flu" pandemic of 1918 and the growing medical interest in Lister's antiseptic theory, some surgeons began wearing cotton gauze masks in surgery; however, this was not to protect the patient from intra-operative infection, but to protect the surgeon from the patient's diseases. Around the same time, operating theatre staff began wearing heavy rubber gloves to protect their hands from the solutions used to clean the room and equipment, a practice surgeons grudgingly adopted.

In the early 20th century a doctor chose to wore a green scrub instead of white. Use of the color blue followed suit and became more commonplace afterwards.

By the 1940s, advances in surgical antisepsis (now called aseptic technique) and the science of wound infection led to the adoption of antiseptic drapes and gowns for operating room use. Instruments, supplies and dressings were routinely sterilized by exposure to either high-pressure steam or ethylene oxide.

Originally, operating room attire was white to emphasize cleanliness. However, the combination of bright operating lights and an all-white environment led to eye strain for the surgeon and staff. By the 1950s and 1960s, most hospitals had abandoned white operating room apparel in favor of various shades of green, which provided a high-contrast environment, reduced eye fatigue, and made bright red blood splashes less conspicuous.

By the 1970s, surgical attire had largely reached its modern state—a short-sleeve V-necked shirt and drawstring pants or a short-sleeve calf-length dress, made of a cotton or cotton/polyester blend. Over this was worn a tie-back or bouffant-style cloth cap, a gauze or synthetic textile mask, a cloth or synthetic surgical gown, latex gloves, and supportive closed-toe shoes. This uniform was originally known as "surgical greens" because of its color, but came to be called "scrubs" because it was worn in a "scrubbed" environment.

== Use ==
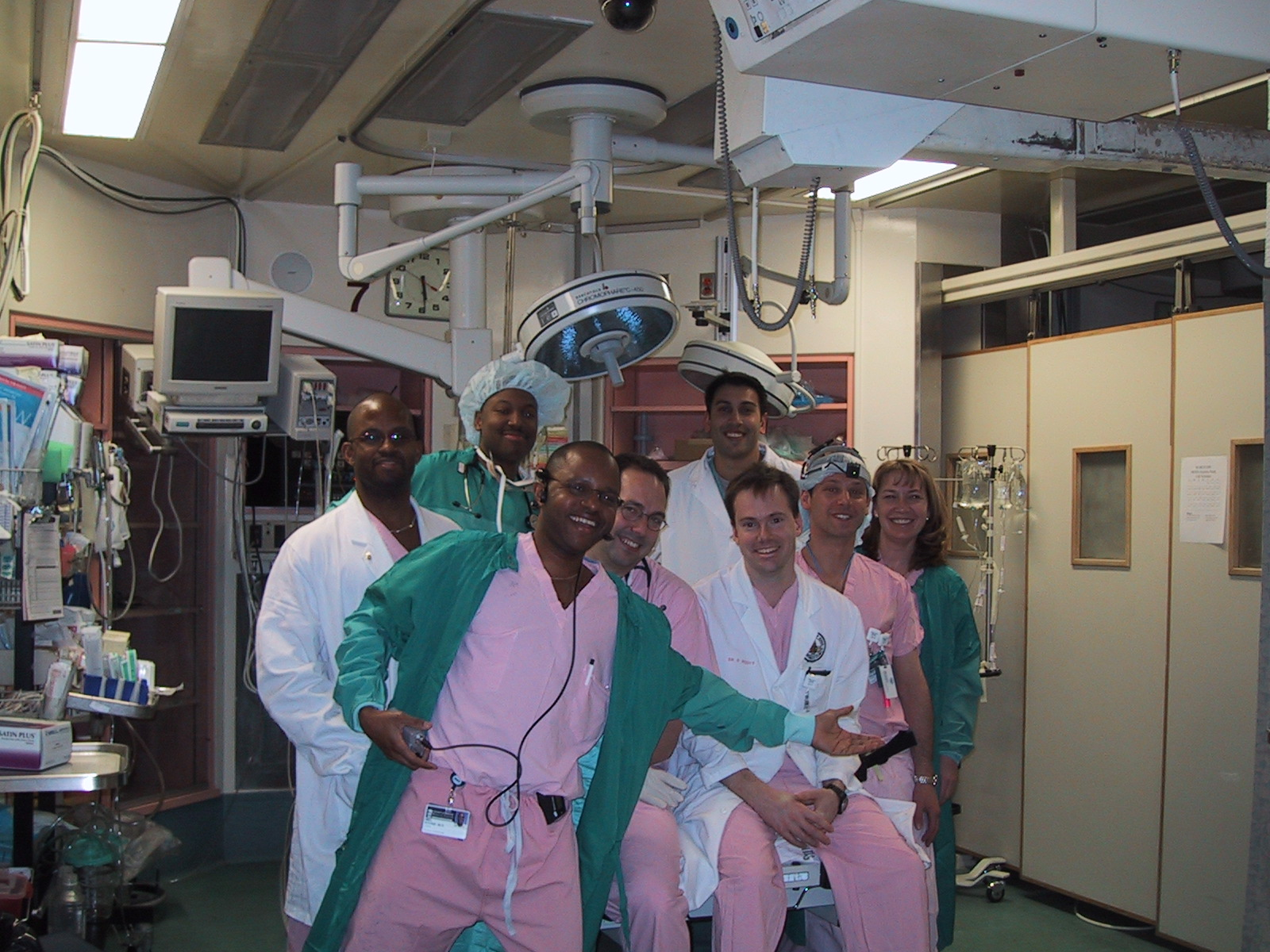
American hospital workers at R Adams Cowley Shock Trauma Center at University of Maryland Medical Center in Baltimore, Maryland wearing scrubs in 2001

In many operating rooms, it is forbidden to wear any exposed clothing, such as a T-shirt, beneath scrubs. As scrubs are designed to promote a clean environment, the wearing of outside clothing is thought to introduce unwanted pathogens. Nearly all patient care personnel at hospitals in the United States wear some form of scrubs while on duty, as do some staffers in doctor, dental, and veterinary offices.

Doctors in the United States may wear their own clothes with a white coat except for surgery. Support staff such as custodians and unit clerks also wear scrubs in some facilities. When the physician is not performing surgery, the scrub is often worn under a white coat.

In England, all NHS hospital trusts have stringent clothing policies, and many of these specifically forbid wearing the iconic white coat for medical staff, owing to infection control concerns. This has meant that several hospitals around the UK have opted for scrubs for staff, especially in Accident and Emergency departments.

Scrubs are also sometimes used as prison uniforms in the U.S. and other countries.

Outside of hospitals, scrubs are becoming more common in other areas especially in light of the global COVID-19 pandemic. Non-traditional industries using scrubs include workout facilities, schools, and restaurants. Health and safety standards are critical to restaurants' success and legal compliance, and there are many opportunities for bacteria to thrive and spread via menus, tables, and shared condiment shakers.

== Modern scrubs ==
Today, any medical uniform consisting of a short-sleeve shirt and pants is known as "scrubs". Scrubs may also include a waist-length long-sleeved jacket with no lapels and stockinette cuffs, known as a "warm-up jacket" also known as “scrub jackets”.

=== Colors and patterns ===
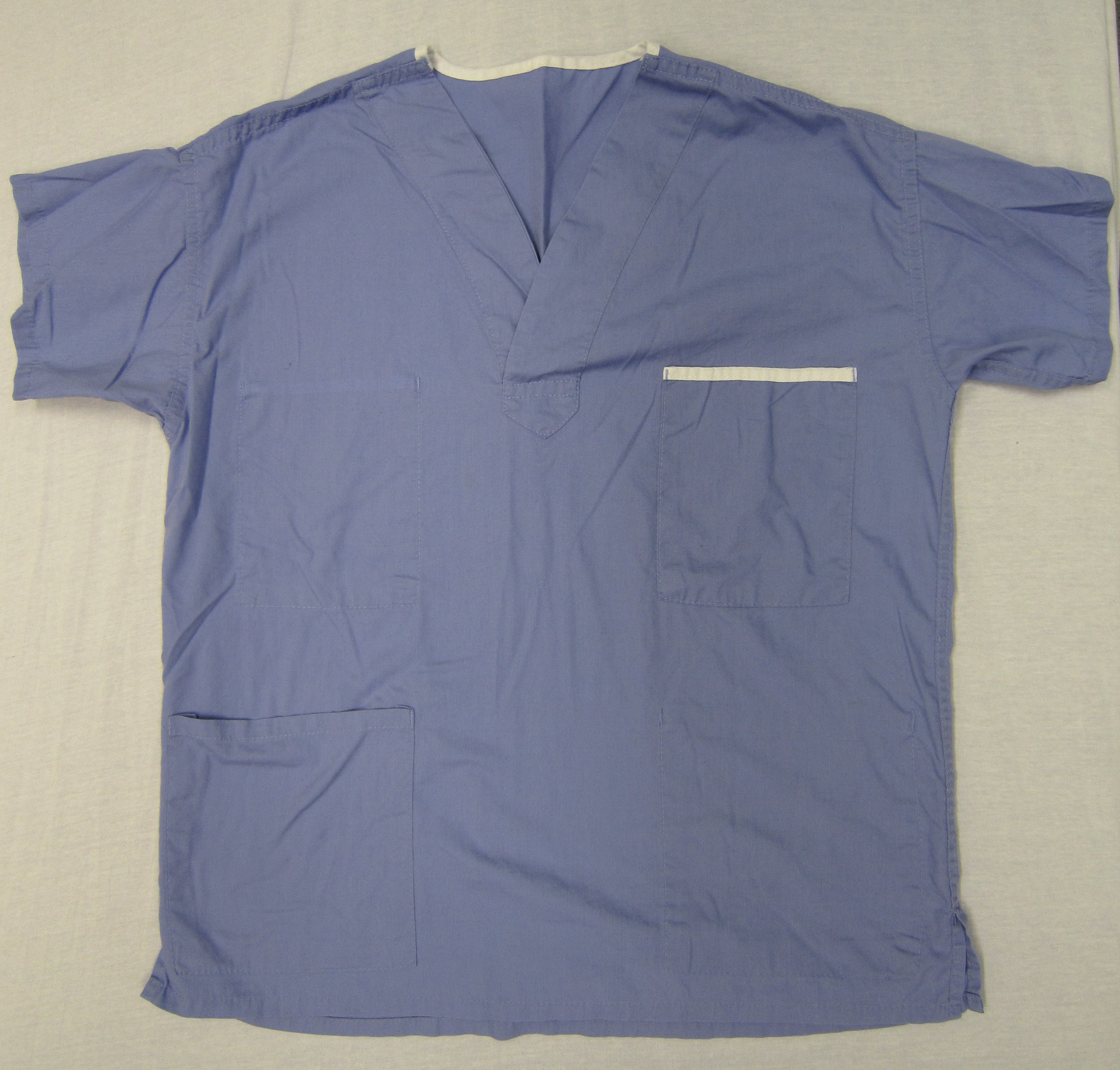
A scrub top

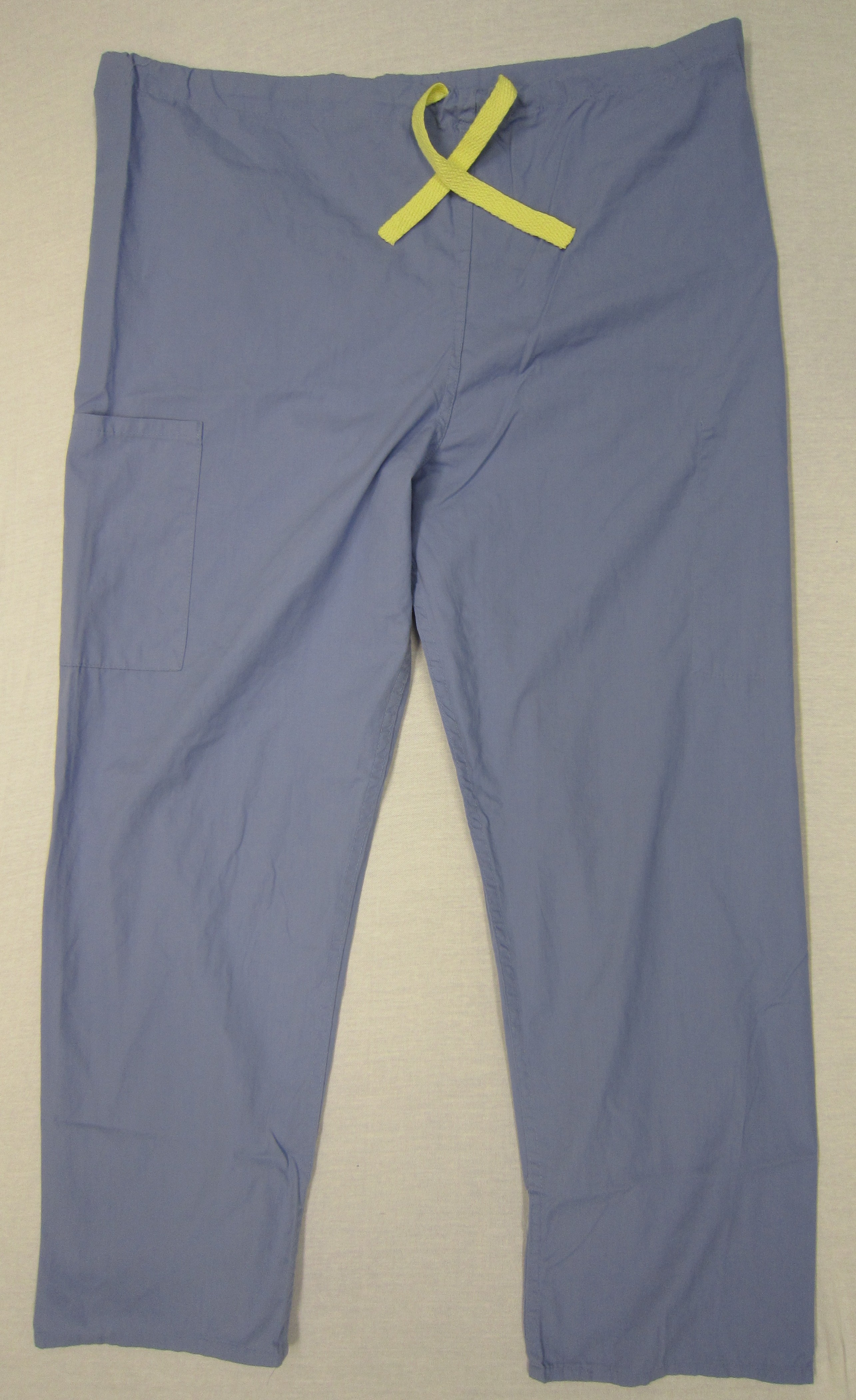
Scrub trousers

Scrubs worn in surgery are almost always colored solid light grey, light green, light blue or a light green-blue shade.

Green scrubs are commonly chosen because green is the opposite of red on the color wheel, which helps doctors avoid visual fatigue and desensitization to the red and pink hues of blood and organs during operations. Blue is also a popular choice for the same reasons. Both colors prevent optical illusions, such as afterimages, which may occur from staring at red or pink for extended periods of time. This shift in color perception allows medical professionals to avoid visual confusion when looking at white surfaces or objects like drapes or other uniforms.

Non-surgical scrubs come in a wider variety of colors and patterns, ranging from official issue garments to custom made, whether by commercial uniform companies or by home-sewing using commercially available printed patterns.

Some hospitals use scrub color to differentiate between patient care departments (i.e., Surgery, Childbirth, Emergency, etc.) or between licensed patient care personnel (nurses, radiologic technologists, respiratory and physical therapists, etc.), unlicensed assistive personnel, and non-patient care support staff (i.e., portering, dietary, unit clerks, etc.). Hospitals may also extend the practice to differentiate non-staff members/visitors.

In England and Wales, many NHS trusts use different colored scrubs to distinguish between different branches of healthcare professionals; for example, anaesthetists may wear maroon. This allows staff and patients to easily spot the workers they are looking for in a high-pressure situation. Piping of different colors or pattern are also often used to distinguish seniority. Many hospitals have posters in reception areas explaining this system but it is mainly designed for hospital staff.

Custom-made printed scrub tops, featuring cartoon characters and cheerful prints, are common in pediatricians' offices, veterinary offices, dental clinics and children's hospitals, and prints for various holidays can be seen throughout the year. Some acute care facilities or larger hospitals also have relaxed rules regarding the wear of non-regulation scrubs in non-surgical units, and they are no longer just the classic v-neck scrub tops, but are now offered in many styles and patterns.

The scrub industry, much like maternity wear, used to have very limited fashion options. Indeed, scrubs were generally box shaped and ill fitted, often with limited design choices. Starting in the early 2010s, the scrub industry began taking notice of the individual preferences of medical professionals and made efforts to design and manufacture fashionable and unique designs.

== Cleaning ==
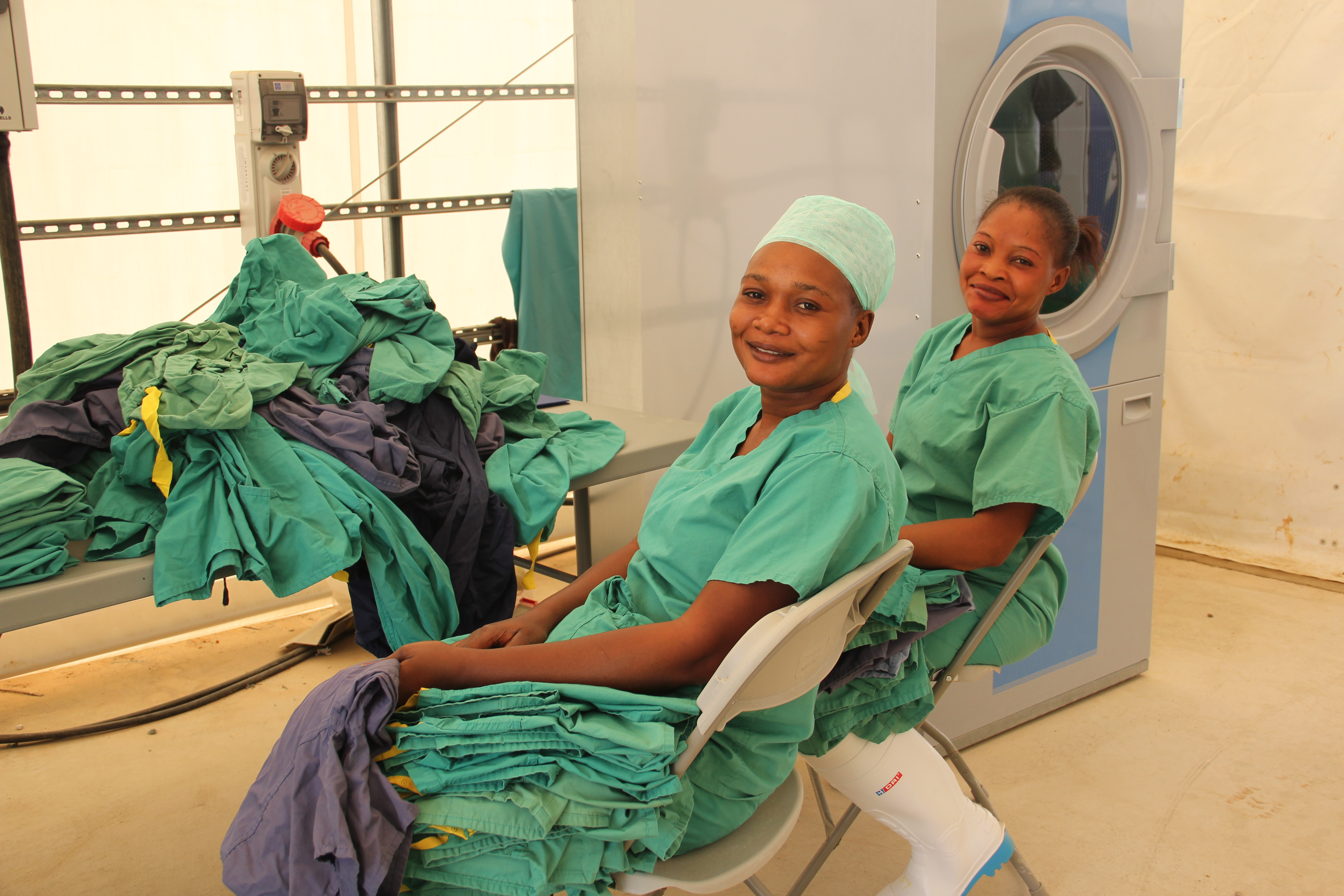
January 2015 laundry service in a medical facility in Sierra Leone. The scrubs are cleaned in-house to prevent the spread of disease.

Surgical scrubs are not generally owned by the wearer. Owing to concerns about home laundering and sterility issues, these scrubs are usually hospital-owned or hospital-leased through a commercial linen service; moreover, owing to these laundering and sterility limitations, disposable scrub suits were introduced to the market.

== Accessories ==
=== Scrub caps ===
Scrub caps have graduated from being functional to also being a personalized accessory both in the operating room and outside. Before the antiseptic focus of the 1940s, hats were not considered essential to surgery. From the 1940s through the 1950s, as a hygienic focus swept the industry, hats became standard wear to help protect patients from contaminants in hair. Full-face hats were even designed for men with beards. These hats have been and continue to be distributed by group purchasing organizations (GPOs) who supply hospitals with most equipment.

In the medical fashion "revolution" of the seventies, more and more medical professionals began personalizing their scrubs by either sewing their own hats or buying premade hats made of colorful patterned fabric. Several styles were popular, including the "bouffant" surgical cap, a utilitarian hairnet-like hat which typically comes in light blue, and the "milkmaid", a bonnet-like wrap around hat.

Bouffant surgical caps are perhaps the most widely used scrub hats in hospitals, and their usage is not limited to only nurses and surgeons: hospital patients are required to wear a bouffant cap when having surgery of any kind.

In 2016, a controversy emerged in the US around the use of cloth or disposable surgical caps vs mandatory use of bouffant style surgical caps. This controversy ended in state mandates for the use of bouffant caps to comply with Joint Commission standards.

=== Sterile hijab ===
Some Muslim women prefer to keep wearing their hijab while working in the operating theatre. Hospitals in the UK and the US began providing disposable hijabs as an alternative to surgical caps.

=== Shoe covers ===
Shoe covers are used to maintain a sterile environment in operating rooms and other healthcare settings. They help prevent the transfer of contaminants from the outside environment into sterile areas by covering the shoes of medical staff and visitors.

They are typically made from lightweight, disposable materials such as polypropylene, polyethylene, or non-woven fabric. These materials are selected for their durability, resistance to moisture, and ease of disposal.

== See also ==
- White coat – Coat worn by medics and scientists
