= Medical gown =

Type of personal protective equipment worn by medical professionals

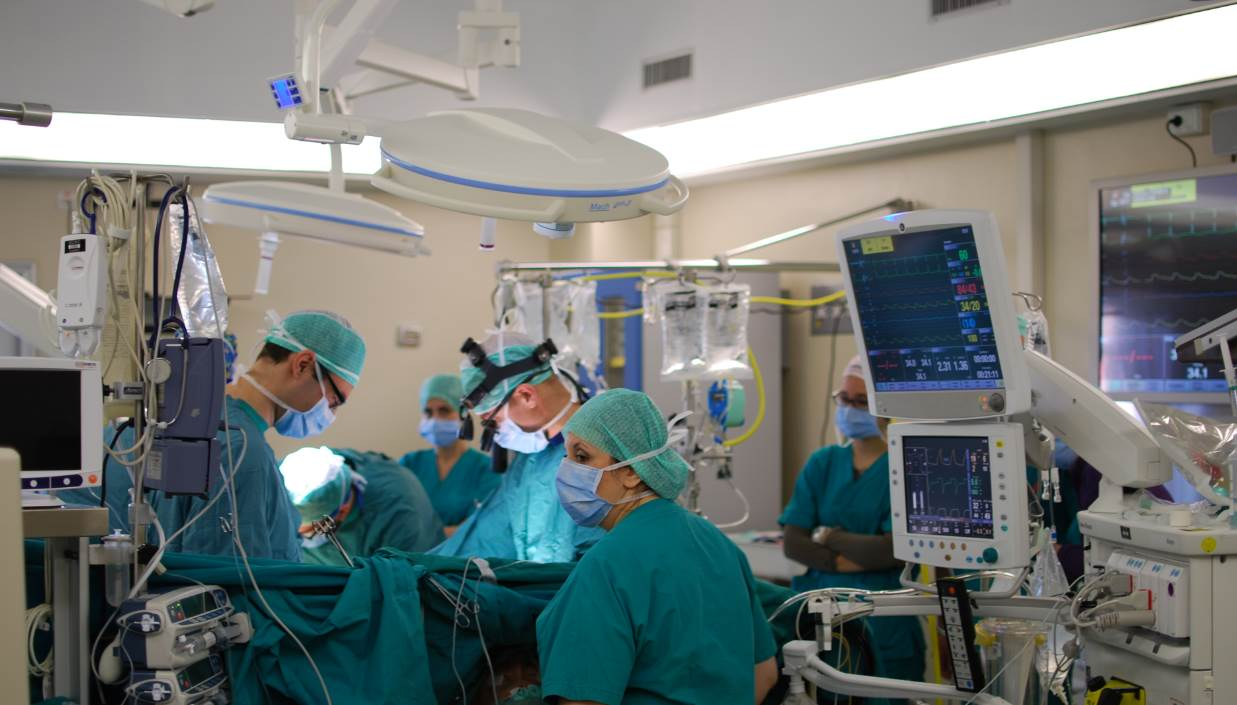
Surgeons in gowns ready to perform heart surgery.

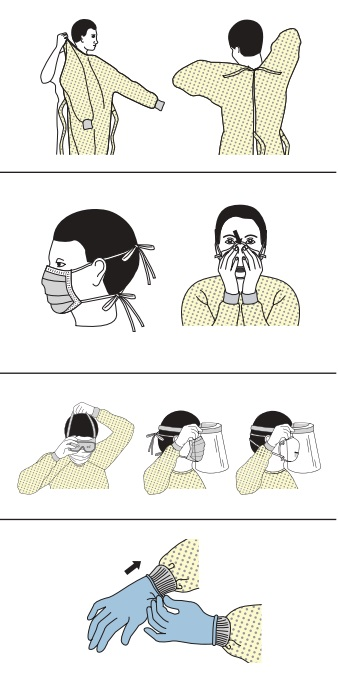
The CDC recommends four steps to putting on personal protective equipment (PPE)

Medical gowns are hospital gowns worn by medical professionals as personal protective equipment (PPE) in order to provide a barrier between patient and professional. Whereas patient gowns are flimsy often with exposed backs and arms, PPE gowns, as seen below in the cardiac surgeon photograph, cover most of the exposed skin surfaces of the professional medics.

In several countries, PPE gowns for use in the COVID-19 pandemic became in appearance more like cleanroom suits as knowledge of the best practices filtered up through the national bureaucracies. For example, the European norm-setting bodies CEN and CENELEC on 30 March 2020 in collaboration with the European Commissioner for the Internal Market made freely-available the relevant standards documents in order "to tackle the severe shortage of protective masks, gloves and other products currently faced by many European countries. Providing free access to the standards will facilitate the work of the many companies wishing to reconvert their production lines in order to manufacture the equipment that is so urgently needed."

== History ==
The concept of PPE in regards to medical professionals was seen as early as the 17th century Plague doctor's outfit.

During the Ebola crisis of 2014, the WHO published a rapid advice guideline on PPE coveralls.

== Types ==
The different levels of various gown types are categorized as follows:

Level	Risk	Exposure	Product usable as/at	Protection levels	Tests
One	Minimum	Standard isolation, Basic care	Visitor gown	Allows small amount of fluid penetration. Slight barrier to fluids.	Only one test of water impacting the gown material's surface is conducted to determine barrier protection.
Two	Low	Surgical suturing, and during blood draw	Pathology lab, Intensive care unit	Protection from fluids for longer period than level one gowns.	Two tests: 1. Water impact on gown's surface for barrier protection.; 2. Pressure test of the material.
Three	Moderate	Intravenous therapy, and to draw arterial blood	In Trauma cases, or at Emergency	Protection from fluids for longer period than level two gowns.	Two tests: 1. Water impact on gown's surface for barrier protection.; 2. Pressure test of the material.
Four	High	Surgery, and where pathogen transmission suspected	Operating theater	Protection against fluids and virus for one hour.	Three tests: 1. Water impact on gown's surface for barrier protection.; 2. Pressure test of the material.; 3. Barrier protection level against simulated blood containing virus

== Local variants ==
=== United States ===
In the United States, medical gowns are medical devices regulated by the Food and Drug Administration. FDA divides medical gowns into three categories. A surgical gown is intended to be worn by health care personnel during surgical procedures. Surgical isolation gowns are used when there is a medium to high risk of contamination and a need for larger critical zones of protection. Non-surgical gowns are worn in low or minimal risk situations.

Surgical and surgical isolation gowns are regulated by the FDA as a Class II medical device that require a 510(k) premarket notification, but non-surgical gowns are Class I devices exempt from premarket review. Surgical gowns only require protection of the front of the body due to the controlled nature of surgical procedures, while surgical isolation gowns and non-surgical gowns require protection over nearly the entire gown.

In 2004, the FDA recognized ANSI/AAMI PB70:2003 standard on protective apparel and drapes for use in health care facilities. Surgical gowns must also conform to the ASTM F2407 standard for tear resistance, seam strength, lint generation, evaporative resistance, and water vapor transmission. Because surgical gowns are considered to be a surface-contacting device with intact skin, FDA recommends that cytotoxicity, sensitization, and irritation or intracutaneous reactivity is evaluated.

=== China ===
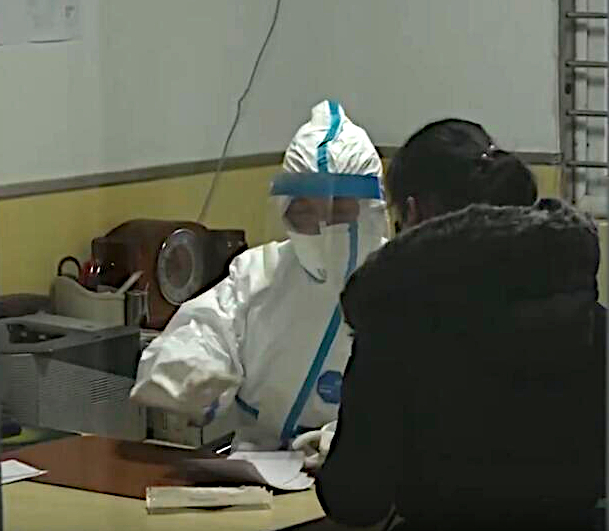
On 22 January 2020, a doctor wearing special PPE suit for the Wuhan coronavirus outbreak treats a patient in Hubei Hospital

The First Affiliated Hospital of the Zhejiang University School of Medicine in Hangzhou, Zhejiang Province, People's Republic of China developed their own protocol and equipment during the early months of the COVID-19 pandemic. A screenshot of the cover of the Handbook of COVID-19 Prevention and Treatment shows a picture of two rows of medical personnel, each wearing PPE gowns and PPE masks and PPE hoods and PPE goggles.

During the COVID-19 pandemic in Wuhan, doctors were provided with full PPE gown suits as early as January 2020.

=== European Union ===
During the COVID-19 pandemic, the European Commissioner for the Internal Market on 30 March 2020 listed the applicable norms for to help manufacturers re-convert their production lines:

- Protective masks

EN 149
2009-08: Respiratory protective devices – Filtering half masks to protect against particles - Requirements, testing, marking
EN 14683
2019-10: Medical face masks - Requirements and test methods

- Eye protection

EN 166
2002-04: Personal eye-protection – Specifications

- Protective clothing

EN 14126
2004-01: Protective clothing - Performance requirements and tests methods for protective clothing against infective agents
EN 14605
2009-08: Protective clothing against liquid chemicals - performance requirements for clothing with liquid-tight (Type 3) or spray-tight (Type 4) connections, including items providing protection to parts of the body only (Types PB [3] and PB [4])
EN ISO 13688
2013-12 Protective clothing - General requirements (ISO 13688:2013)
EN 13795-1
2019-06: Surgical clothing and drapes - Requirements and test methods – Part 1: Surgical drapes and gowns
EN 13795-2
2019-06: Surgical clothing and drapes - Requirements and test methods – Part 2: Clean air suits

- Gloves

EN 455-1
2001-01 Medical gloves for single use – Part 1: Requirements and testing for freedom from holes
EN 455-2
2015-07: Medical gloves for single use – Part 2: Requirements and testing for physical properties
EN 455-3
2015-07: Medical gloves for single use – Part 3: Requirements and testing for biological evaluation
EN 455-4
2009-10: Medical gloves for single use – Part 4: Requirements and testing for shelf life determination
EN 420
2010-03: Protective gloves - General requirements and test methods
EN ISO 374-1
2018-10 Protective gloves against dangerous chemicals and micro-organisms – Part 1: Terminology and performance requirements for chemical risks
EN ISO 374-5
2017-03: Protective gloves against dangerous chemicals and micro-organisms – Part 5: Terminology and performance requirements for micro-organisms risks (ISO 374-5:2016)

==== Italy ====
In an early April 2020 article, 20 doctors from the whole of Italy describe their experience with coronavirus patient care. Their conclusion reads:

Instituting precise well-established plans to perform undeferrable surgical procedures and emergencies on COVID-19-positive patient is mandatory. Hospitals must prepare specific internal protocols and arrange adequate training of the involved personnel.

Their findings are set out in a table entitled "Necessary personal protection equipment":

- FFP2 facial mask or (in case of maneuvers at high risk of generating aerosolized particles:) FFP3 facial mask
- Disposable long sleeve waterproof coats, gowns, or Tyvek suits
- Disposable double pair of nitrile gloves
- Protective goggles or visors
- Disposable head caps
- Disposable long shoe covers
- Alcoholic hand hygiene solution

=== Israel ===
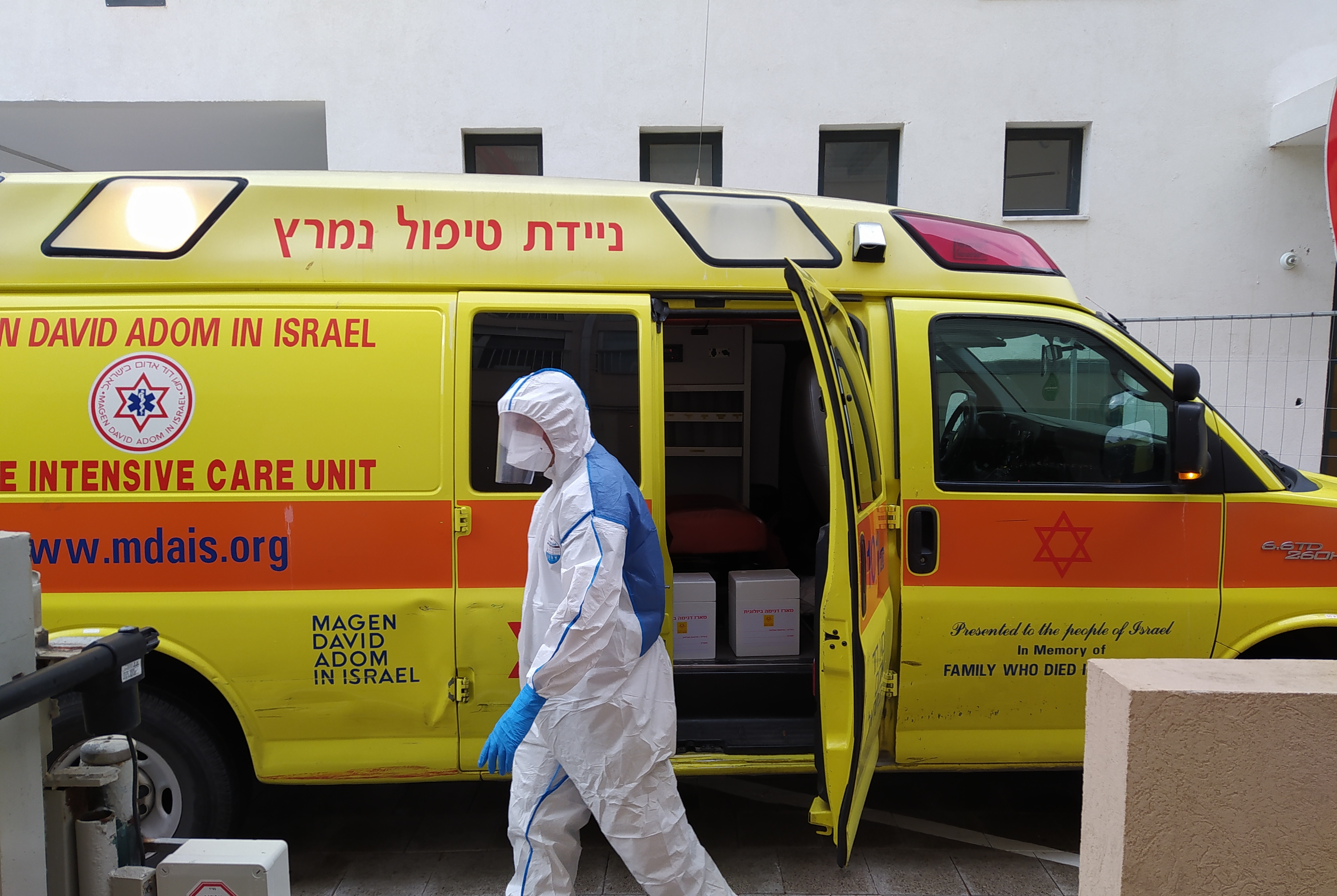
On 17 March 2020, a Magen David Adom hospital worker dressed in protective gear walks beside a mobile intensive care unit

As seen in the accompanying gallery figure, at least one Israeli hospital had access to full Tyvek PPE gowns as early as 17 March 2020 during the COVID-19 pandemic.

== Criticisms ==
In a May 2017 research article, several French scientists complained that there was little harmonization across Europe for the names of pathogens, and went on to describe the PPE norms and regulations in France for infectious diseases under BSL-3.

== See also ==
- Plague doctor's outfit – Clothing worn by plague doctors that was intended to protect them from infection, historical equivalent
- Hazmat suit
- Workplace hazard controls for COVID-19
