= City of the Sun =

City of the Sun may refer to:

- City of the Sun is a Russian settlement inhabited by followers of the cultist Vissarion
- City of the Sun (band), an American acoustic post-rock trio from New York City
- City of the Sun (Levien novel), a 2008 novel by David Levien
- City of the Sun (Maio novel), a 2014 novel by Juliana Maio
- City of the Sun, New Mexico, an intentional community in New Mexico
- City of the Sun (TV series), a South Korean television drama series
- Stad van de Zon, housing project in the Netherlands
- The City of the Sun, the 1602 utopian work by Tommaso Campanella
- The City of the Sun is a nickname of Cagliari, the capital of the island of Sardinia
- The City of the Sun (film), 2005 comedy film co-produced by Slovakia and the Czech Republic

== See also ==
- Sun City (disambiguation)
- Heliopolis (disambiguation) (Greek for "Sun City")
