= Suryapura =

Suryapura may refer to:

== India ==
- Suryapur or Suryanagar, Srinagar (the capital of Jammu and Kashmir, India) in ancient Indian texts
- Suryapura, India, village in Bihar, India
- Suryanagar, village in Maharashtra, India

== Nepal ==
- Suryapura, Nawalparasi, Nepal
- Suryapura, Rupandehi, Nepal

== See also ==
- Surajpur (disambiguation)
- Surajpura (disambiguation)
- Sun City (disambiguation), literal translation of Suryapura
- Srinagar (disambiguation)
- Surjapuri language, an eastern Indo-Aryan language of India
