= Surajpura =

Surajpura may refer to:

- Surajpura, Bhopal, a village in Madhya Pradesh, India
- Surajpura, Rohtas, a village in Bihar, India

== See also ==
- Surajpur (disambiguation)
- Suryapura (disambiguation)
- Sun City (disambiguation), literal translation of Surajpura
