= Heerhugowaard =

- City
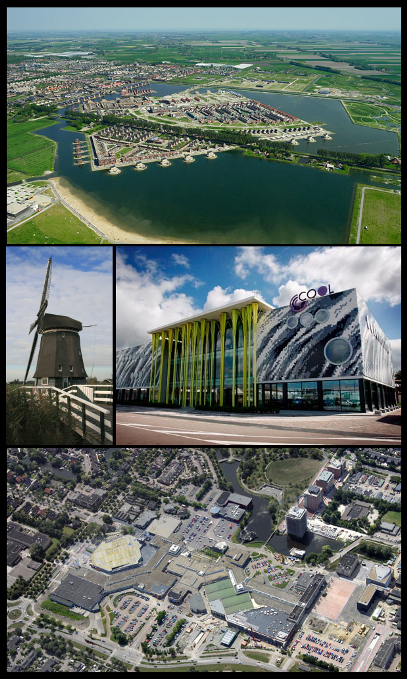
- Images from top, left to right: Stad van de Zon, Veenhuizer windmill, Cool theatre, shopping centre Middenwaard.

- Flag Coat of arms
- Motto: City Of Opportunities
- Location of the former municipality of Heerhugowaard in North Holland
- Coordinates: 52°40′N 4°50′E
- Country: Netherlands
- Province: North Holland
- Municipality: Dijk en Waard
- Founder: Huygen Dijck

Area
  - Total: 39.99 km^{2} (15.44 sq mi)
  - Land: 38.21 km^{2} (14.75 sq mi)
  - Water: 1.78 km^{2} (0.69 sq mi)
- Elevation: −3 m (−9.8 ft)

Population (January 2021)
  - Total: 58,387
  - Density: 1,528/km^{2} (3,960/sq mi)
- Demonym(s): Heerhugowaarder (Informal) Reiger
- Time zone: UTC+1 (CET)
  - Summer (DST): UTC+2 (CEST)
- Postcode: 1700–1706
- Area code: 072

Heerhugowaard (Dutch: [ˌɦeːrɦyɣoːˈʋaːrt]; West Frisian Dutch: Heerhugoweard, Heregeweard or De Weard) is a city in the Netherlands, in the province of North Holland and the region of West Friesland.

Heerhugowaard was previously a separate municipality, which merged with the former municipality of Langedijk into the new municipality of Dijk en Waard on 1 January 2022.

== History ==
Around the year 800, the area of the modern Heerhugowaard was covered in peat fen. Because of peat-digging and storm floods, many lakes developed in the region, including the Heerhugowaard. The name is derived from lord ('heer' in Dutch) Hugo van Assendelft who was killed by the West Frisians in this area in 1296. After two storms in 1248, the abbey of Egmond, which had much property in this region, built the Schagerdam at Schagen. This became part of the Westfriese Omringdijk, which protected the pentagon Schagen - Alkmaar - Medemblik - Enkhuizen - Hoorn.

Uncontrollable increase of the lake had been prevented. In the 17th century private investors decided to drain the lake to create farmland. In 1630 the polder was drained and the 39.0 km^{2} (15.1 sq mi) of land was divided among the investors. In contrast to e.g. the Beemster, the new land was poor quality, and in 1674 there was a proposal to refill the polder, as fishing would be more profitable.

== Geography ==
Heerhugowaard is part of the province of North-Holland and is located in the west of the Netherlands. The land reclamation of Heerhugowaard is situated 3 metres under sea level. The surrounding land is flat as it is formed of large polders. To the southwest of the city lies Alkmaar.

=== Topography ===
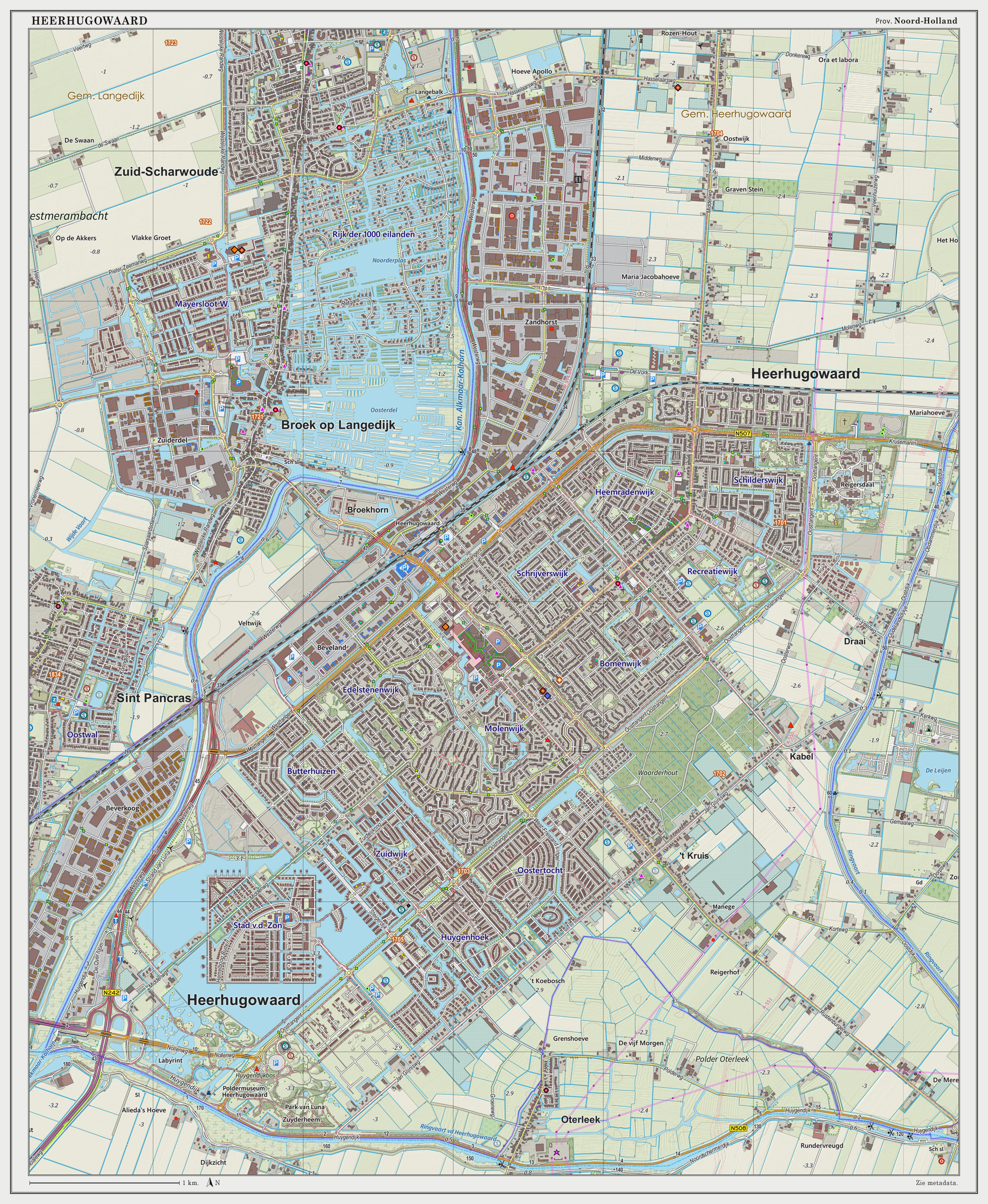
Map of Heerhugowaard (town), 2014.

=== Climate ===
Heerhugowaard has a cool oceanic climate (Köppen climate classification Cfb), strongly influenced by its proximity to the North Sea to the west, with prevailing north-western winds and gales. Winter temperatures are cool to mild. Heerhugowaard, as well as most of North-Holland province, lies in USDA Hardiness zone 9, the northernmost such occurrence in continental Europe. Frosts mainly occur during spells of easterly or northeasterly winds from the inner European continent, from Scandinavia, Russia, or even Siberia. Even then, because Heerhugowaard is surrounded on three sides by large bodies of water, as well as enjoying a significant heat island effect, nights rarely fall below −5 °C (23 °F). Summers are moderately warm but rarely hot. The average daily high in August is 23 °C (73.4 °F).

Heerhugowaard's average annual rainfall is 871 millimetres (34.3 in), with measurable precipitation on an average of 189 days per year. Most is in the form of protracted drizzle or light rain, making cloudy and damp days common during the cooler months of October to March. Only the occasional European windstorm brings significant rain in a short period of time, requiring it to be pumped out to higher ground or to the seas around the city.

Climate data for Heerhugowaard
Month	Jan	Feb	Mar	Apr	May	Jun	Jul	Aug	Sep	Oct	Nov	Dec	Year
Mean daily maximum °C (°F)	6 (43)	7 (45)	10 (50)	14 (57)	18 (64)	21 (70)	22 (72)	23 (73)	19 (66)	14 (57)	10 (50)	6 (43)	14.2 (57.6)
Mean daily minimum °C (°F)	1 (34)	1 (34)	2 (36)	4 (39)	8 (46)	10 (50)	13 (55)	13 (55)	11 (52)	7 (45)	4 (39)	1 (34)	6.3 (43.3)
Average precipitation mm (inches)	74 (2.9)	67 (2.6)	54 (2.1)	45 (1.8)	59 (2.3)	46 (1.8)	78 (3.1)	98 (3.9)	79 (3.1)	93 (3.7)	89 (3.5)	89 (3.5)	871 (34.3)
Average precipitation days	19	16	14	13	14	12	15	14	16	17	21	18	189
Average relative humidity (%)	88	85	82	78	77	79	80	82	84	86	88	88	83.1
Mean monthly sunshine hours	93	112	155	180	217	240	217	186	180	124	90	93	1,887
Source: Weeronline.nl

== Cityscape ==
=== Population centres ===
The former municipality of Heerhugowaard consisted of the following towns, villages and/or districts: Broekhorn, Butterhuizen, De Noord, Draai, Frik, Kabel, 't Kruis, Veenhuizen, Verlaat, Oostertocht, Bomenwijk, Schilderswijk, Rivierenwijk, Edelstenenwijk, Stad van de Zon.

=== Expansion ===
Over time the population has grown. In 1960, Heerhugowaard had 6,800 inhabitants; increasing to 25,000 in 1975, 47,239 in 2004 and 48,267 in 2005. In May 2007, Heerhugowaard welcomed its 50,000th inhabitant, exceeding 58,000 by 2021. For several years in the 1970s, Heerhugowaard was the fastest growing municipality in the Netherlands. It is expected that by around 2050, Heerhugowaard will have approximately 100,000 inhabitants, although young people are moving away, so this number might never be reached.

The major part of the population lives in so-called Vinex-districts. The rural core of the North lies in the Middenwaard. The core of the south is at Stationsweg by the old church. In the polders there are small hamlets. The greater part of the town is new developments. Heerhugowaard has a number of subdivisions which were set up the same as in Almere, for example the writer district, the tree district, the planet district, and the nature area of Butterhuizen. In two of the newest districts, called Stad van de Zon I and II (= City of the Sun I and II) the energy supplies for a considerable part comes from solar energy.

=== Parks ===
The surroundings of Heerhugowaard are quite varied, and include much farmland, with flower bulb fields to the east. In 1986, 61 hectares of woodland were planted to the southeast of the city, the "Waarderhout".

=== Commerce ===
One shopping centre in Heerhugowaard is Middenwaard, owned by real estate investment company Wereldhave. Middenwaard was built in five phases. Construction began in 1974, with the last phase completed in 2008, with renovations since then.

== Transport ==
Heerhugowaard has good connections. Buses go to Alkmaar, Bergen NH, Broek Op Langedijk and Ursem. Also Heerhugowaard has Interliner links. Heerhugowaard railway station is on the routes to Hoorn and Den Helder, Alkmaar - Amsterdam - Nijmegen, and Alkmaar - Haarlem - The Hague. Heerhugowaard is on the N242, the N508 and N507 roads.

== Government ==
The former municipal council of Heerhugowaard consisted of 31 seats, which were divided as follows:

City council seats
Party	1998	2002	2006	2010	2014	2018
Heerhugowaardse Onafhankelijke Partij	5	4	3	5	5	7
Senioren HHW	-	-	-	-	3	5
VVD	7	5	5	5	4	5
CDA	6	5	4	3	4	4
D66	2	2	-	2	3	3
GroenLinks	-	3	2	3	1	2
Nederland Duurzaam	-	-	-	-	1	2
PvdA	6	4	7	4	3	2
ChristenUnie	-	1	1	1	1	1
SP	-	-	-	-	3	-
Burgerbelang	1	5	7	4*	2*	-
Lijst Marjan Jongejan	-	-	-	-	1*	-
Verenigde Senioren Partij	-	-	-	2	-	-
Trots op Nederland	-	-	-	1	-	-
Lijst Piet Carnas	-	-	-	1*	-	-
Total	27	29	29	31	31	31

* = separation of Burgerbelang

Elections were held in November 2021 for the newly merged municipality of Dijk en Waard, that included Heerhugowaard, which commenced work in January 2022. The merged municipal council of Dijk en Waard consists of 37 seats, which were divided as follows:

City council seats
Party	2022
Dijk&Waardse Onafhankelijke Partij	7
Lokaal Dijk en Waard	6
VVD	5
CDA	2
D66	3
GroenLinks	3
Senioren Dijk en Waard	4
PvdA	2
ChristenUnie	2
FvD	3
Total	27

== Sister cities ==
Heerhugowaard has one sister city:

- Kalisz, Poland, since 1992

== Notable people ==
- Theodorus Dekker (1927 – 2021) a Dutch mathematician who developed Dekker's algorithm

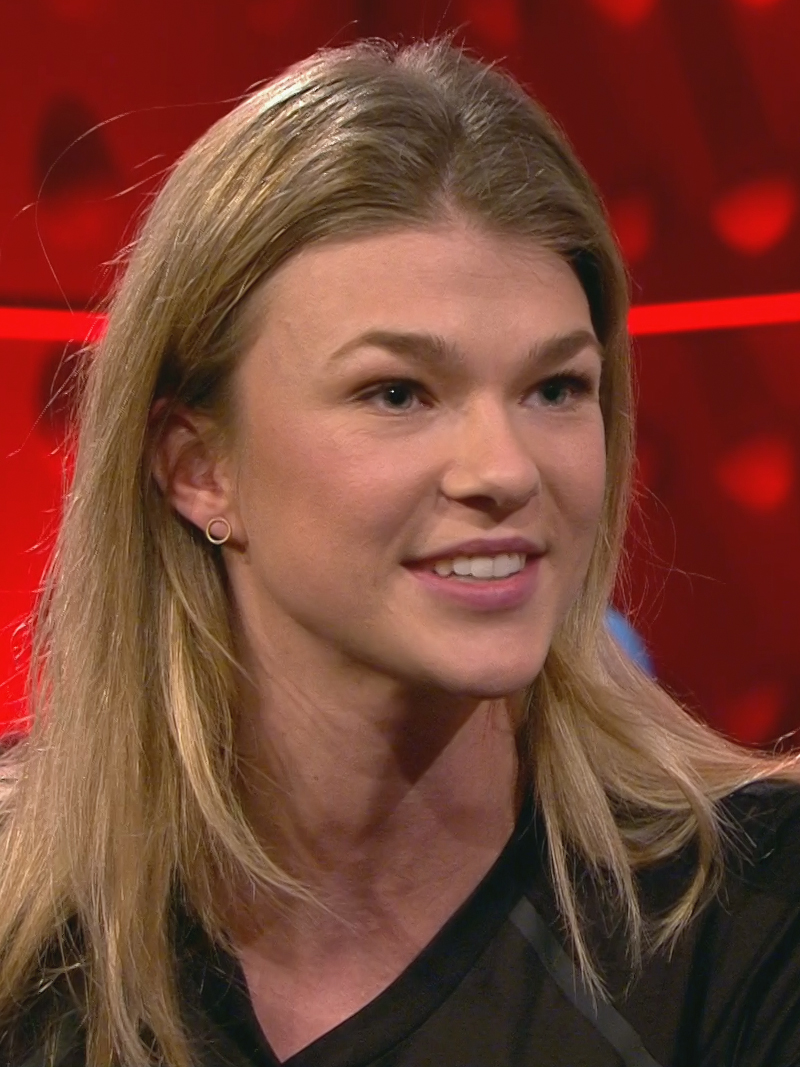
Tess Wester, 2018

=== Sport ===
- Rudi Lubbers (born 1945) a retired Dutch boxer who competed at the 1964 and 1968 Summer Olympics
- Richonell Margaret (born 2000) a Surinamese footballer
- Monique van der Lee (born 1973) a former Dutch judoka, competed at the 1992 Summer Olympics
- Anousjka van Exel (born 1974) a Dutch former tennis player
- Arvid Smit (born 1980) a football coach and former professional footballer with 224 club caps
- Stefanie van der Gragt (born 1992) a Dutch footballer
- Tess Wester (born 1993) a Dutch handballer and world champion who plays as goalkeeper for the Dutch national team

== Gallery ==
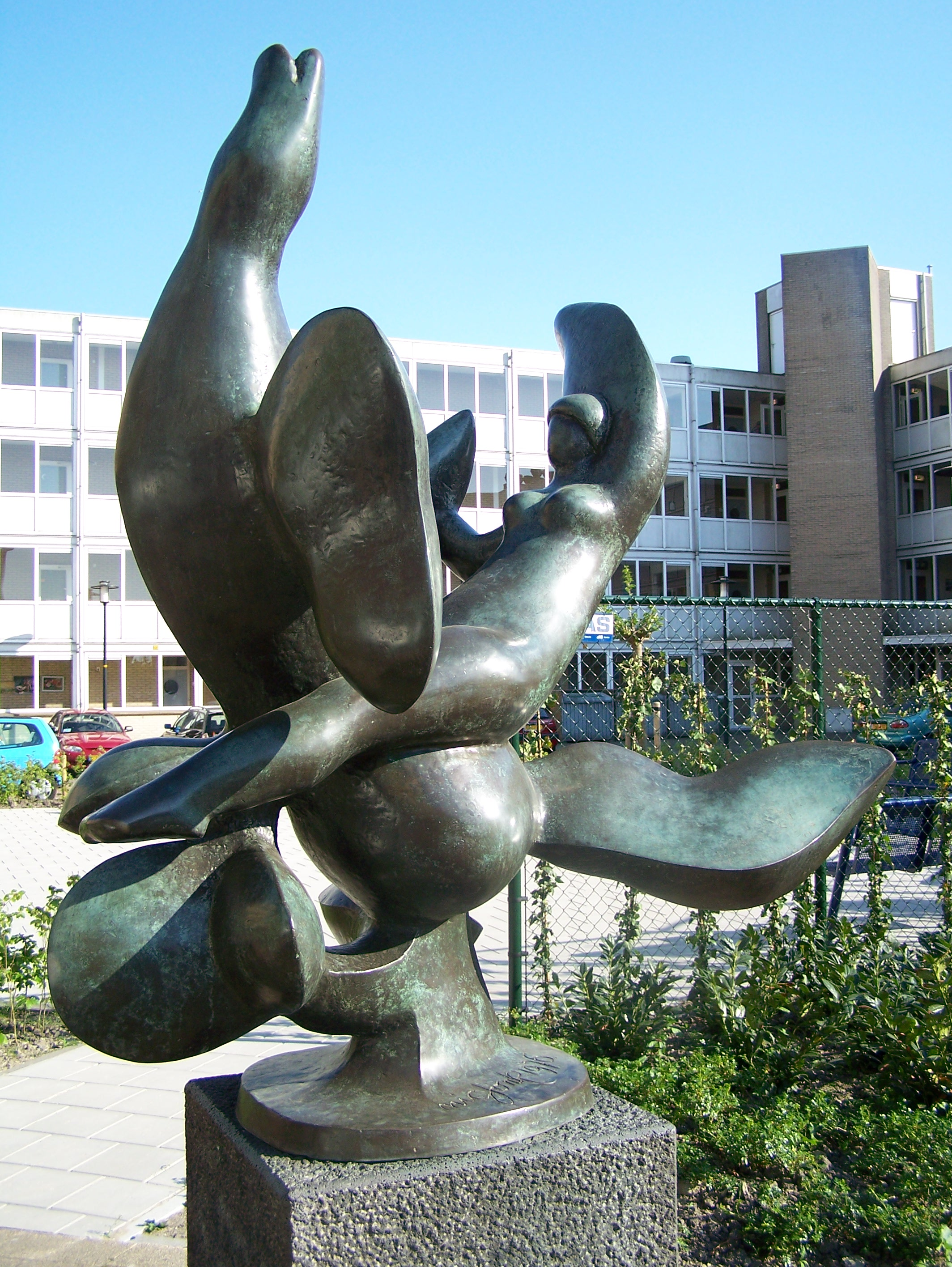
Earth and water, by Nic Jonk in Dolomiet Square

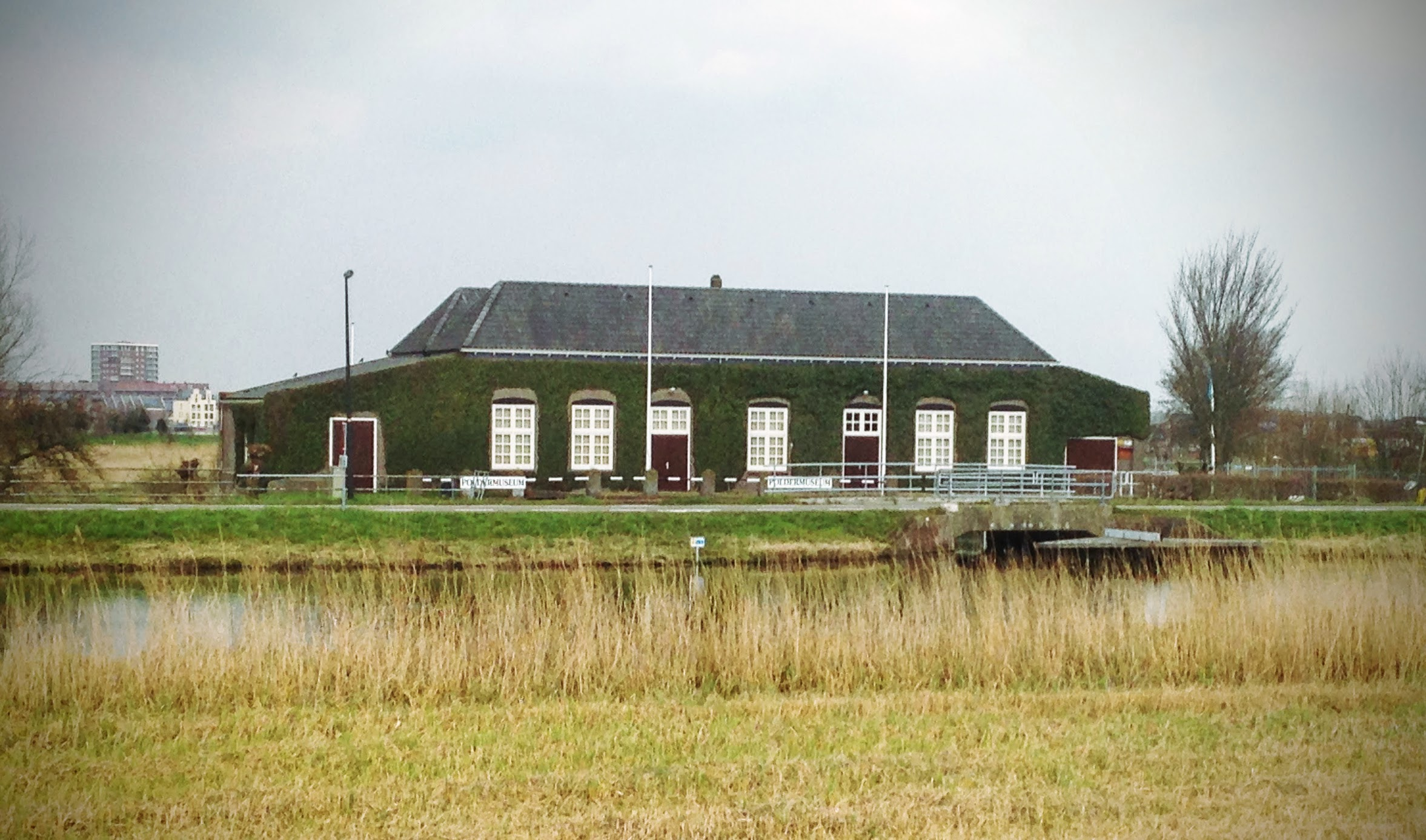
Poldermuseum Heerhugowaard

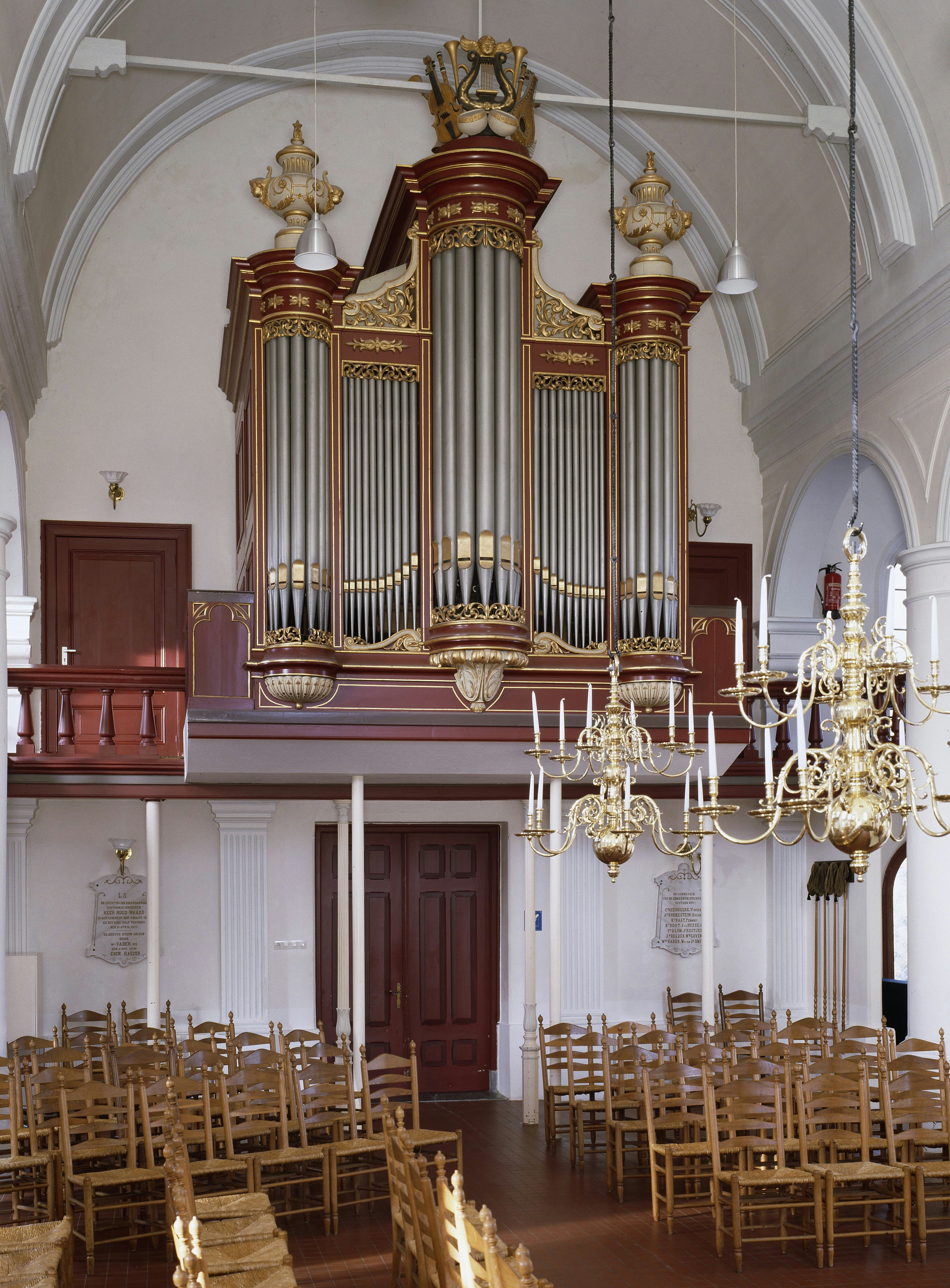
Dutch Reformed Church - Heerhugowaard

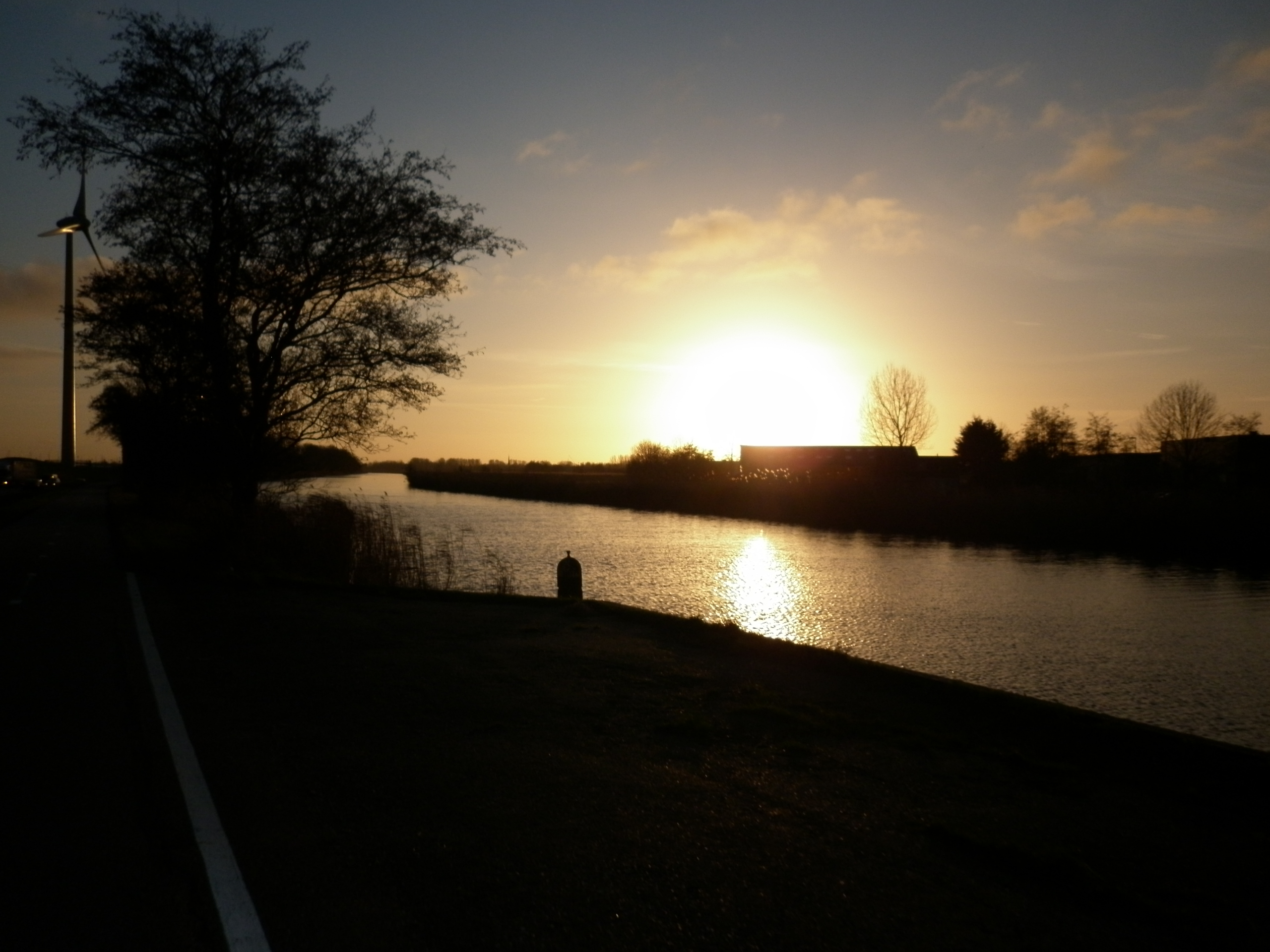
Heerhugowaard-Alkmaar 2011

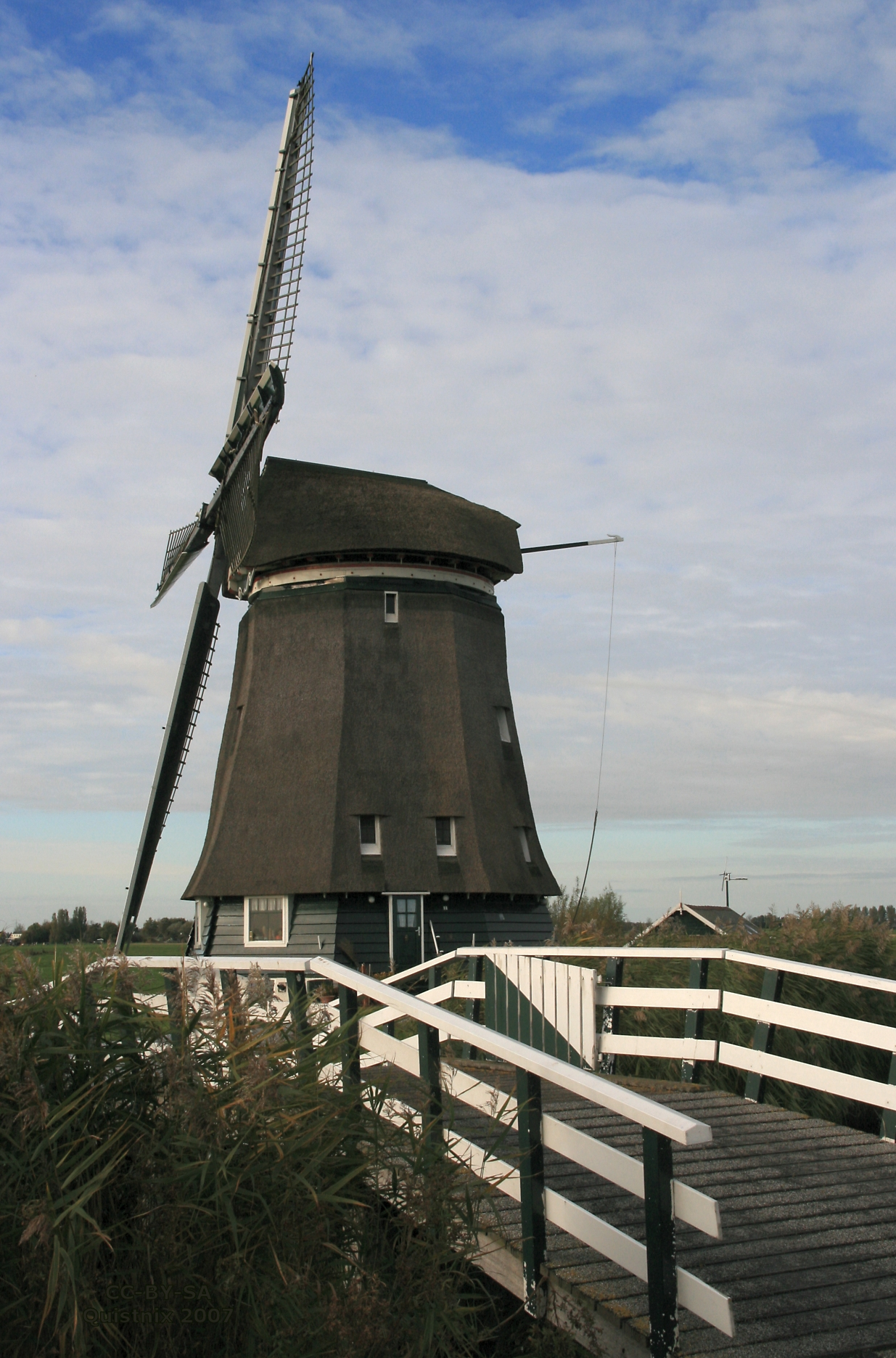
Veenhuizer windmill
