= Intercity bus service =

Bus and coach services between large settlements

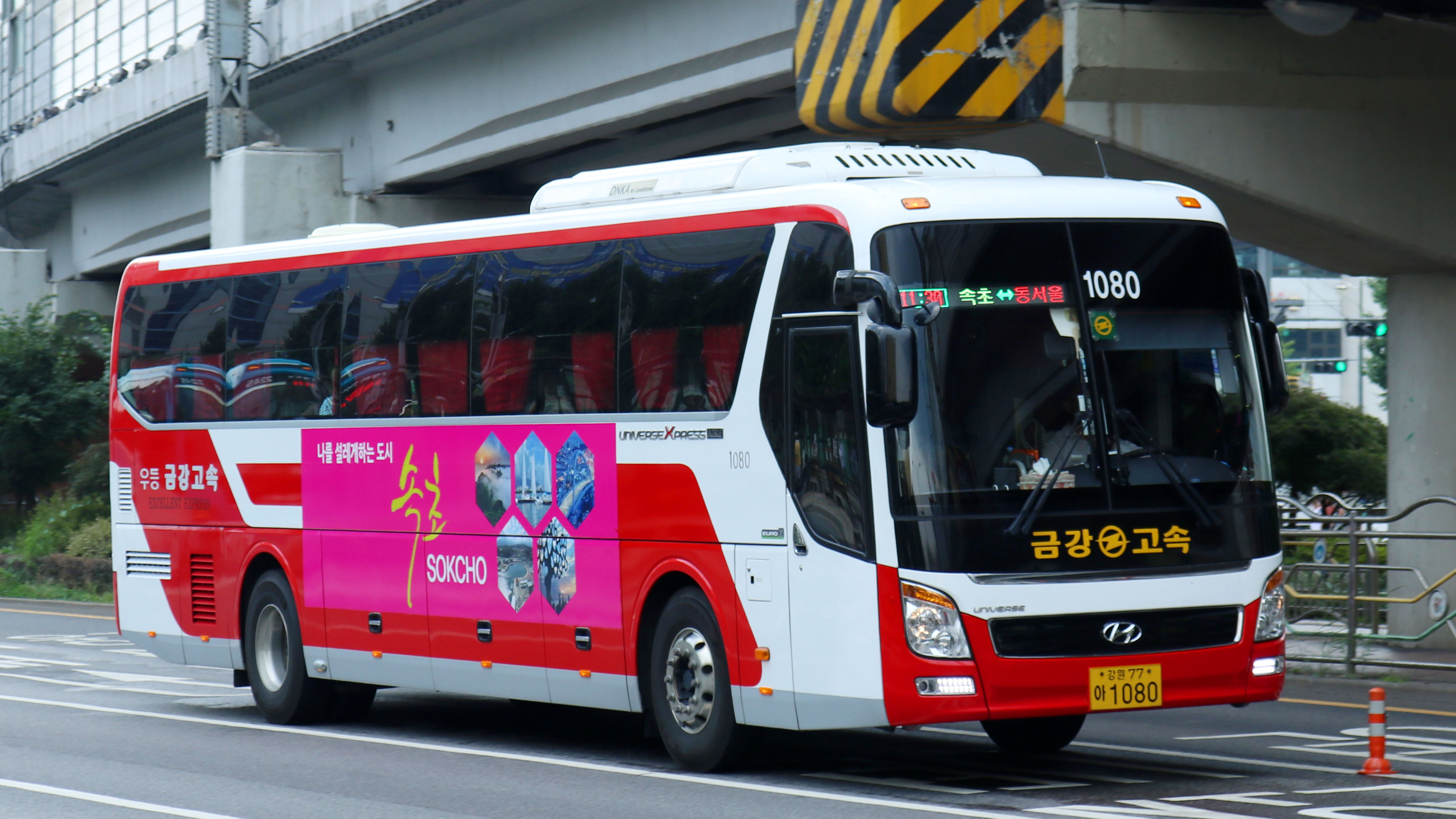
Geumgang Express Hyundai Universe in South Korea.

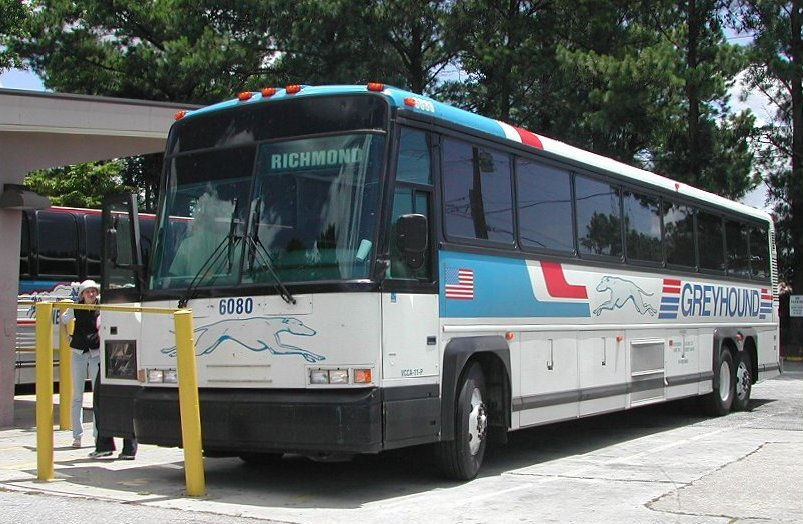
An integral bodywork MCI 102DL3, an intercity bus owned by Greyhound Lines, typical of those used in the 1990s and early 2000s in the United States

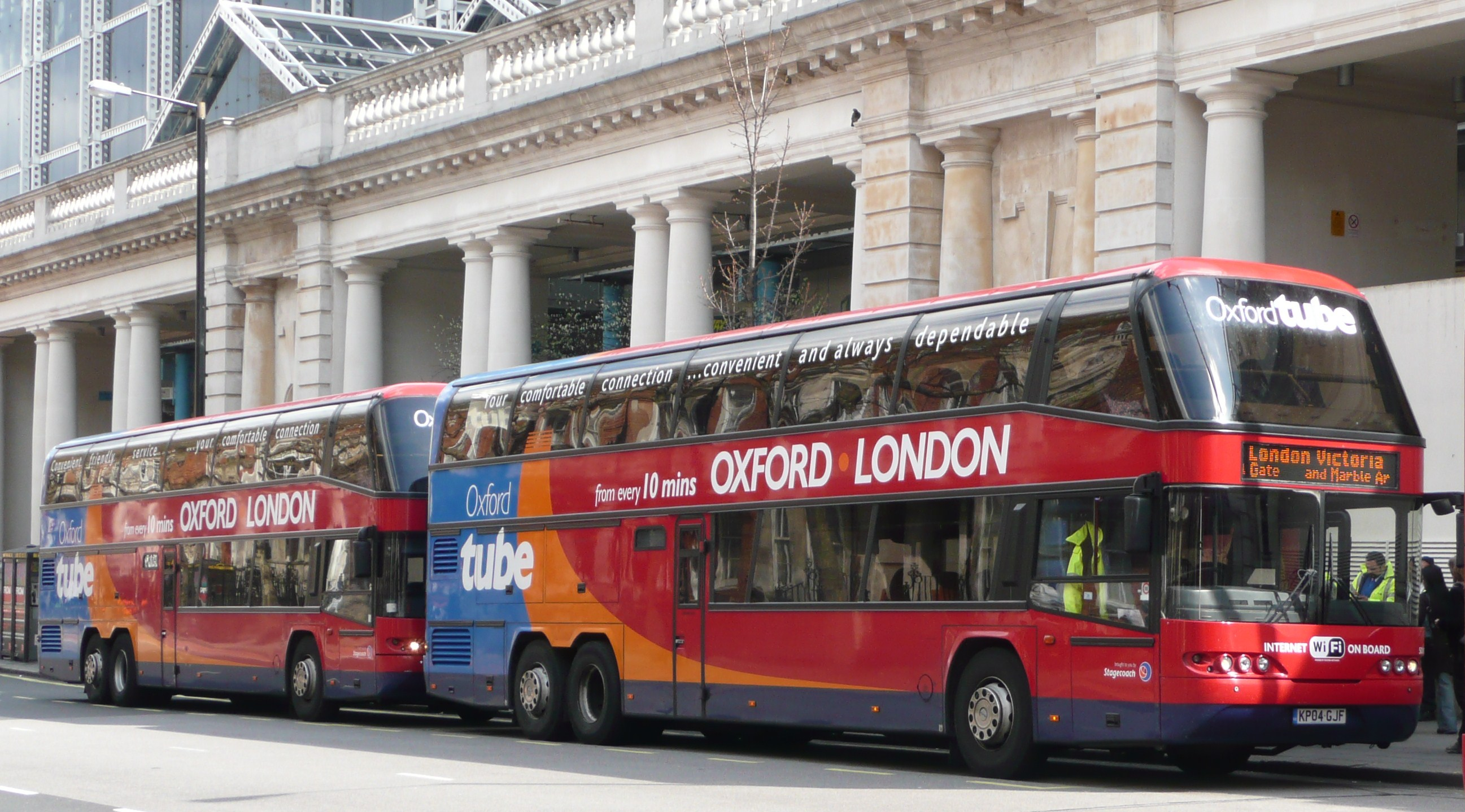
Two Oxford Tube buses, with Neoplan Skyliner chassis, at the Buckingham Palace Road terminus, in London, England

An intercity bus service (North American English) or inter-city coach service (British English and Commonwealth English), also called a long-distance, express, over-the-road, commercial, long-haul or highway bus or coach service, is a public transport service using coaches to carry passengers significant distances between different cities, towns or other populated areas. Unlike a transit bus service, which has frequent stops throughout a city or town, an inter-city bus service generally has a single stop at one location in or near a city – usually at a transit interchange – and travels long distances without stopping. Inter-city bus services may be operated by government agencies or private industry, for profit and not for profit. Inter-city coach travel can serve areas or countries with no train services, or may be set up to compete with trains by providing a more flexible or cheaper alternative.

The conversion of inter-city road lanes into public transit only lanes can significantly increase the efficacy of the public transit system, especially when done in scale as in Israel. However, lack of enforcement can reduce the efficiency and speed of intercity buses on such lanes. The creation on scale of public transit only intercity lanes through the conversion of existing car lanes into public transit only lanes can lead to major boosts to the economy according to The Marker.

Inter-city bus services are of prime importance in lightly populated rural areas that often have little or no public transport.

Inter-city bus services are one of four common transport methods between cities, not all of which are available in all places; the others are by airliner, train and private car.

== History ==
=== Stagecoaches ===
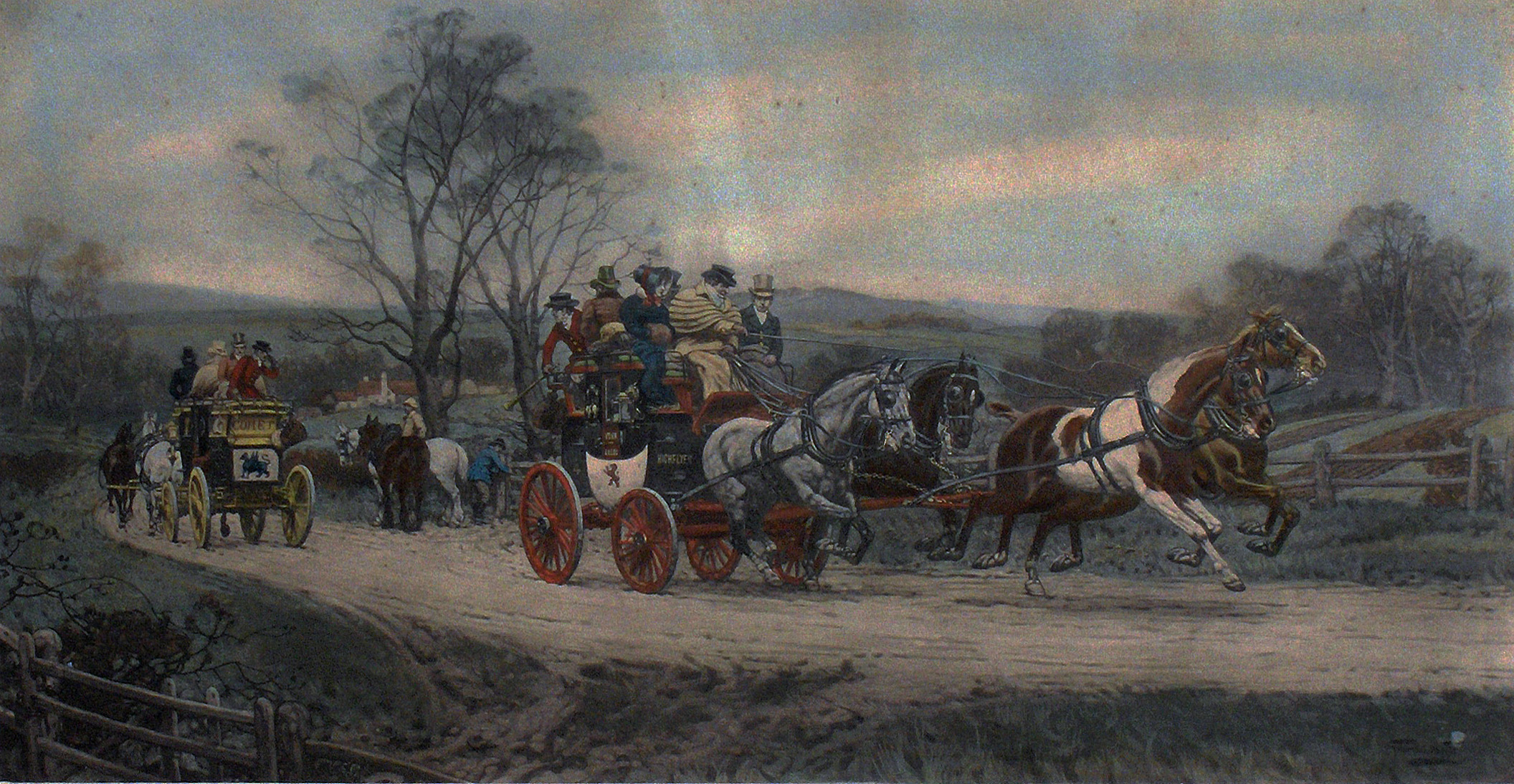
Behind time, anonymous engraving of a stagecoach in England.

The first intercity scheduled transport service was called the stagecoach and originated in the 17th century. Crude coaches were being built from the 16th century in England, but without suspension, these coaches achieved very low speeds on the poor quality rutted roads of the time. By the mid 17th century, a basic stagecoach infrastructure was being put in place. The first stagecoach route started in 1610 and ran from Edinburgh to Leith. This was followed by a steady proliferation of other routes around the country.

A string of coaching inns operated as stopping points for travellers on the route between London and Liverpool by the mid 17th century. The coach would depart every Monday and Thursday and took roughly ten days to make the journey during the summer months. They also became widely adopted for travel in and around London by mid-century and generally travelled at a few miles per hour. Shakespeare's first plays were staged at coaching inns such as The George Inn, Southwark.

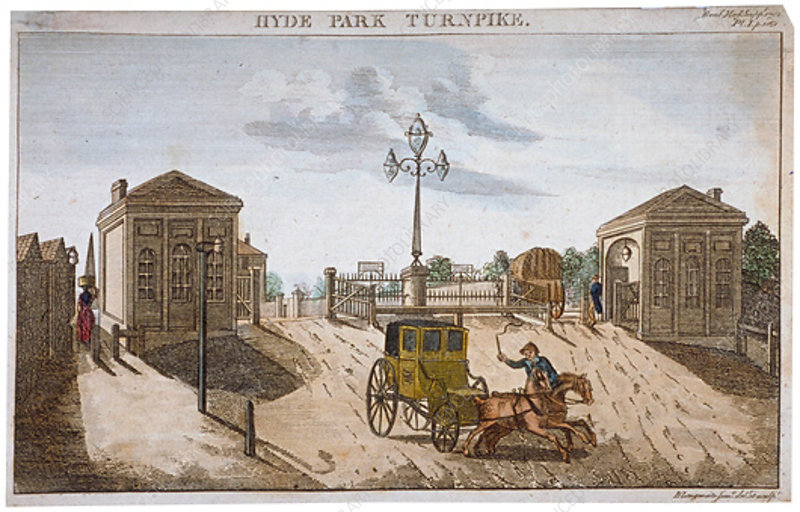
The Hyde Park Gate in London, erected by the Kensington Turnpike Trust. These trusts helped to stimulate a sustained period of road improvement in the 18th century.

The speed of travel remained constant until the mid-18th century. Reforms of the turnpike trusts, new methods of road building and the improved construction of coaches all led to a sustained rise in the comfort and speed of the average journey—from an average journey length of 2 days for the Cambridge-London route in 1750 to a length of under 7 hours in 1820. Robert Hooke helped in the construction of some of the first spring-suspended coaches in the 1660s and spoked wheels with iron rim brakes were introduced, improving the characteristics of the coach.

In 1754, a Manchester-based company began a new service called the "Flying Coach". It was advertised with the following announcement: "However incredible it may appear, this coach will actually (barring incidents) arrive in London in four days and a half after leaving Manchester." A similar service was begun from Liverpool three years later, using coaches with steel spring suspension. This coach took an unprecedented three days to reach London with an average speed of eight miles per hour (13 km/h).

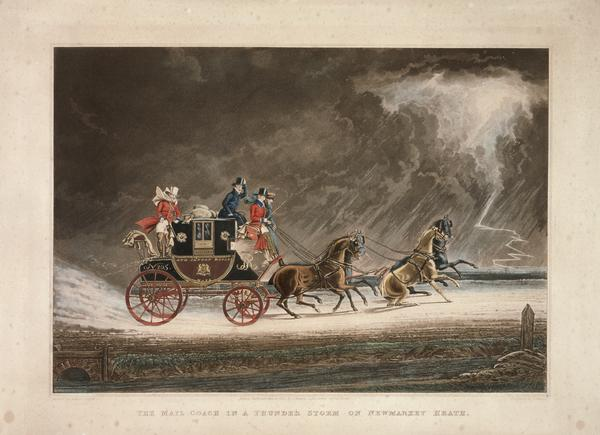
Mail coach decorated in the black and scarlet Post Office livery near Newmarket, Suffolk in 1827.

Even more dramatic improvements to coach speed were made by John Palmer at the British Post Office, who commissioned a fleet of mail coaches to deliver the post across the country. His experimental coach left Bristol at 4 pm on 2 August 1784 and arrived in London just 16 hours later.

The golden age of the stagecoach was during the Regency period, from 1800 to 1830. The era saw great improvements in the design of the coaches, notably by John Besant in 1792 and 1795. His coach had a greatly improved turning capacity and braking system, and a novel feature that prevented the wheels from falling off while the coach was in motion. Obadiah Elliott registered the first patent for a spring-suspension vehicle. Each wheel had two durable steel leaf springs on each side and the body of the carriage was fixed directly to the springs attached to the axles.

Steady improvements in road construction were also made at this time, most importantly the widespread implementation of Macadam roads up and down the country. Coaches in this period travelled at around twelve miles per hour (19 km/h) and greatly increased the level of mobility in the country, both for people and for mail. Each route had an average of four coaches operating on it at one time – two for both directions and a further two spares in case of a breakdown en route.

=== Motorbuses ===
The development of railways in the 1830s spelt the end for the stagecoaches across Europe and America, with only a few companies surviving to provide services for short journeys and excursions until the early years of the 20th century.

The first motor coaches were acquired by operators of those horse-drawn vehicles. W. C. Standerwick of Blackpool, England acquired its first motor charabanc in 1911, and Royal Blue from Bournemouth acquired its first motor charabanc in 1913. Motor coaches were initially used only for excursions.

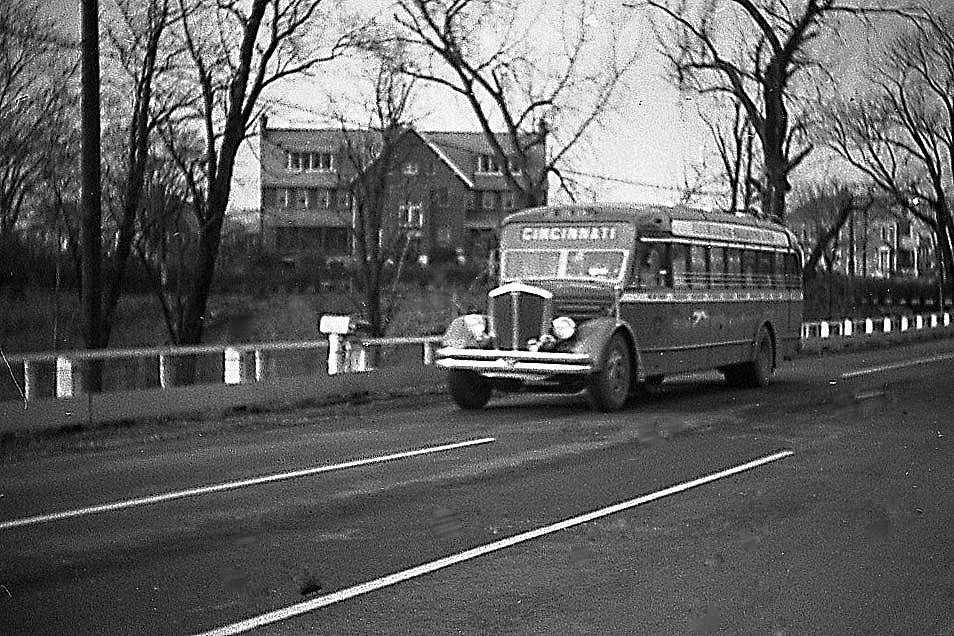
A Greyhound bus in 1939.

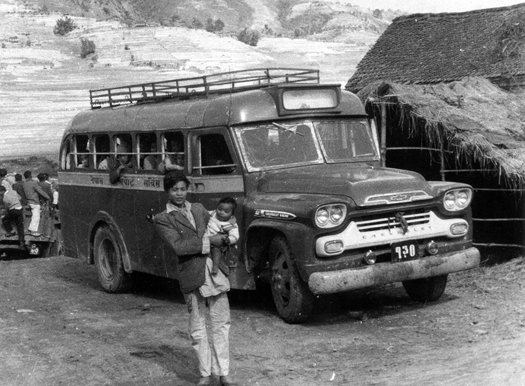
A Chevrolet bus of Nepal Transport Service in 1961.

In 1919, Royal Blue took advantage of a rail strike to run a coach service from Bournemouth to London. The service was so successful that it expanded rapidly. In 1920, the Minister of Transport Eric Campbell Geddes was quoted in Punch magazine as saying "I think it would be a calamity if we did anything to prevent the economic use of charabancs" and expressed concern at the problems caused to small charabanc and omnibus operators in parliament.

In America, Carl Eric Wickman began providing the first service in 1913. Frustrated about being unable to sell a seven-passenger automobile on the showroom floor of the dealership where he worked, he purchased the vehicle himself and started using it to transport miners between Hibbing and Alice, Minnesota. He began providing this service regularly in what would start a new company and industry. The company would one day be known as Greyhound.

In 1914, Pennsylvania was the first state to pass regulations for bus service in order to prevent monopolies of the industry from forming. All remaining U.S. states would soon follow.

The coach industry expanded rapidly in the 1920s, a period of intense competition. The Road Traffic Act 1930 in the UK introduced a national system of regulation of passenger road transport and authorised local authorities to operate transport services. It also imposed a speed limit of 30 mph (48 km/h) for coaches whilst removing any speed limit for private cars.

The 1930s to the 1950s saw the development of bus stations for intercity transport. Many expanded from simple stops into major architecturally designed terminals that included shopping and other businesses. Intercity bus transport increased in speed, efficiency and popularity until the 1950s and 1960s, when as the popularity of the private automobile has increased, the use of intercity bus service has declined. For example, in Canada in the 1950s, 120 million passengers boarded intercity bus service each year; in the 1960s, this number declined to 50 million. During the 1990s, it was down to 10 million.

== Characteristics of inter-city buses/coaches ==
Intercity buses, as they hold passengers for significant periods of time on long journeys, are designed for comfort. Intercity buses, also known as coaches or motor coaches are almost always high-floor buses, with separate luggage-hold mounted below the passenger compartment. In contrast to transit buses, motor coaches typically feature forward-facing seating, with no provision for standing. Other accommodations may include onboard restrooms, televisions, and overhead luggage space. A sleeper bus is an example of a vehicle with optimum amenity for the longest travel times, specially adapted for passengers to sleep in. A tide-coach operates to co-ordinate its schedule with the tide patterns at a seaport.

== Route and operation ==
An intercity coach service may depart from a bus station with facilities for travellers or from a simple roadside bus stop. A coachway interchange is a term (in the United Kingdom) for a stopping place on the edge of a town, with connecting local transport. Park and ride facilities allow passengers to begin or complete their journeys by automobile. Intercity bus routes may follow a direct highway or freeway/motorway for shortest journey times, or travel via a scenic route for the enjoyment of passengers.

Intercity buses may run less frequently and with fewer stops than a transit bus service. One common arrangement is to have several stops at the beginning of the trip, and several near the end, with the majority of the trip non-stop on a highway. Some stops may have service restrictions, such as "boarding only" (also called "pickup only") and "discharge only" (also called "set-down only"). Routes aimed at commuters may have most or all scheduled trips in the morning heading to an urban central business district, with trips in the evening mainly heading toward suburbs.

Intercity coaches may also be used to supplement or replace another transport service, for example when a train or airline route is not in service.

== Inter-city bus/coach lanes ==
In Israel, intercity roads and highways have at times dedicated lanes which can only be used by buses. Such lanes ensure that intercity buses are not hindered by traffic jams and can dramatically improve travel times. Such improvements make public transport more attractive which when done on scale can lead to an "extraordinary economic boost to the overall economy". An example of intercity lanes in scale is the Tel Aviv metropolitan area in which the city of Tel Aviv in conjunction with the Israeli transportation ministry pushed for the establishment of such lanes. The work required to convert lanes was done over one night and required the painting of clear symbols (In Israel, yellow diamonds) which indicate that there is a public transit only lane. The Marker reported that lack of effective enforcement has derailed the effectiveness of such lanes since lack of police enforcement has led some motorists to use the lanes, thus damaging public transit efficacy.

== Safety ==
Statistically, intercity bus service is considered to be a very safe mode of transportation. For example, in the United States there are about 0.5 fatalities per 100 million passenger miles traveled according to the National Safety Council.

Crashes involving intercity buses can be disastrous in their magnitude because of the large number of passengers they are capable of carrying. For example, the Kempsey bus crash in Australia on 22 December 1989 involved two full tourist coaches, each traveling at 100 km/h (62 mph), colliding head-on: 35 people died and 41 were injured.

== Intercity coach travel by country ==
=== Americas ===
==== Canada ====
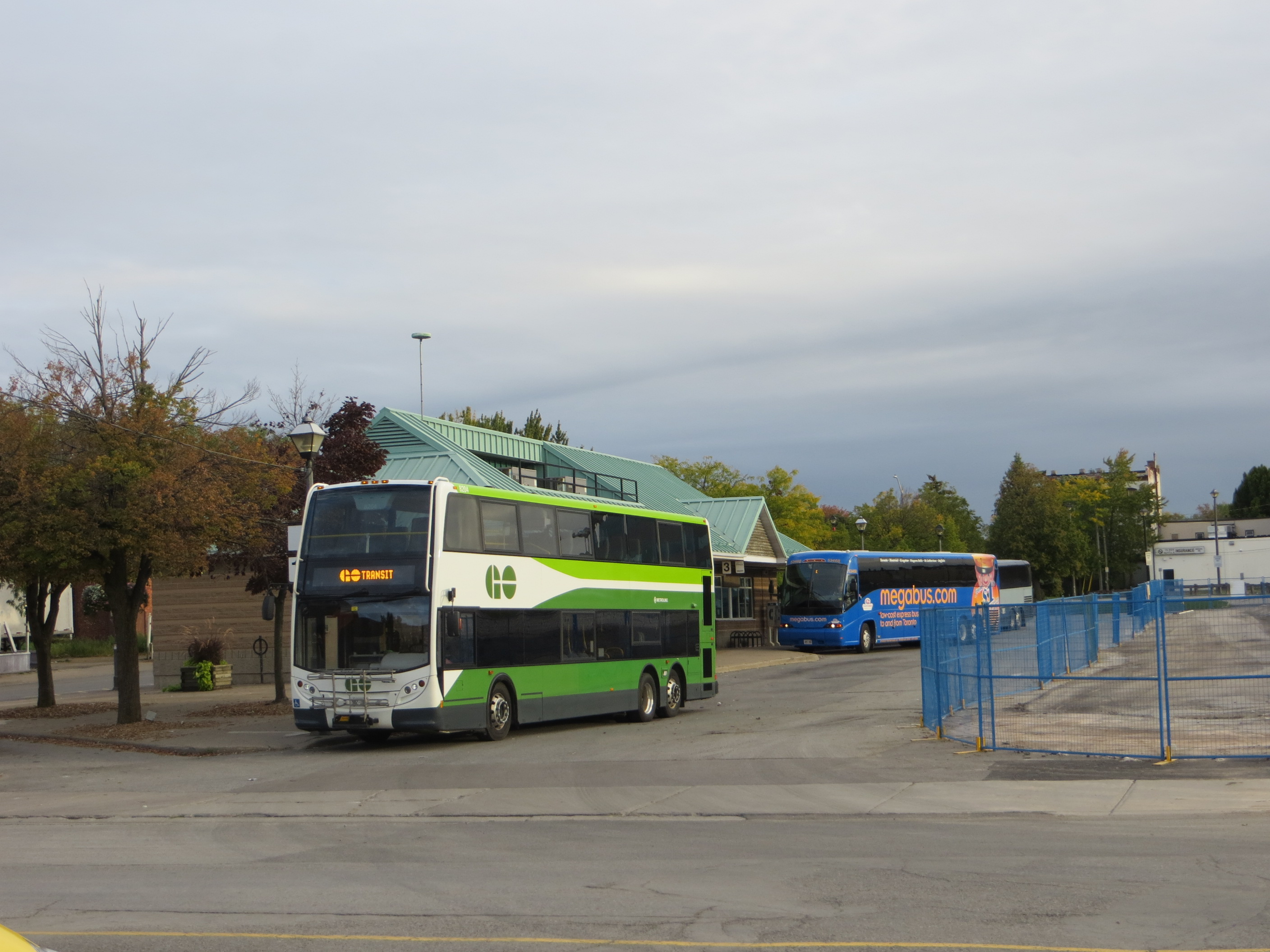
Intercity coaches from GO and Megabus seen in Niagara Falls, Ontario

Intercity coach service is the only public transit to reach many urban centres in Canada, and Via Rail services are very sporadic outside the Québec City–Windsor Corridor. Coach service is mostly privately owned and operated, and tends to be regionally focused. Greyhound Canada, once Canada's biggest intercity carrier, ceased operations in 2021. FlixBus entered the Canadian market in 2022, and currently offers service in six provinces. Other major operators are listed below.

- British Columbia and Alberta: BC Bus North, Red Arrow, Ebus
- Ontario: Coach Canada (Megabus), GO Transit, Ontario Northland
- Quebec: Orleans Express, Intercar, Limocar
- Maritime Provinces: Maritime Bus
- Newfoundland: DRL Coachlines

=== Asia ===
==== China ====
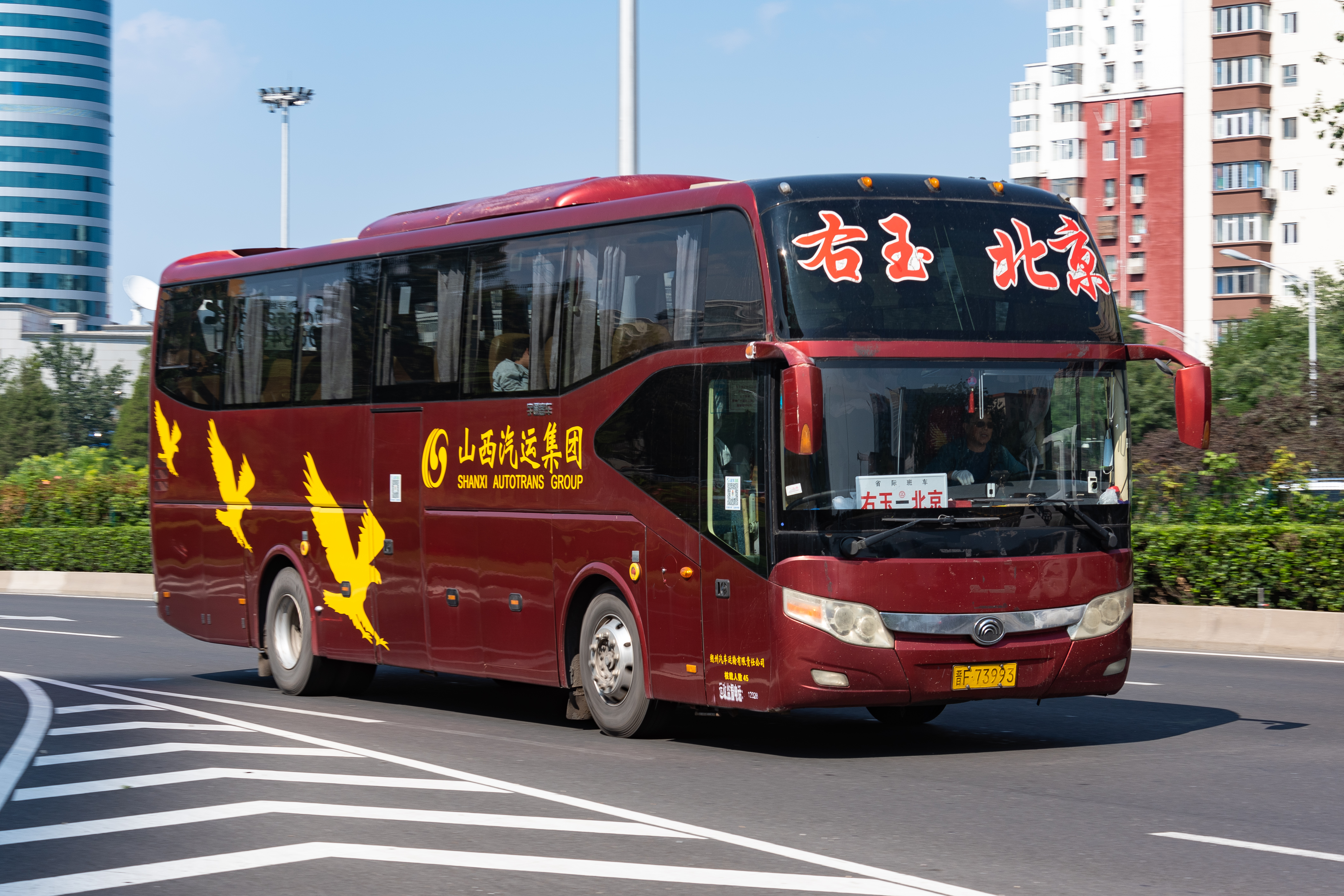
Intercity coach at Liuliqiao, connecting Beijing with Youyu.

In relatively developed regions of China where the motorway network is extensive, intercity coach is a common mean of transport between cities. In some cities, for example Shenzhen, nearly every town / district has a coach station.

Coach services can be further categorised into high speed (via motorway, Chinese: 高速客运) and low speed (via national highways, Chinese: 低速客运) services, with the latter stopping along the route to carry rural passengers.

The number of people opting for long-distance bus travel is on the decline since 2014. Partly this is due to the development of high-speed rail, with train tickets having a similar price to bus tickets, and train services often being much faster, buses are not competitive anymore. Other reasons are the increase in private car ownership and the popularity of ride-hailing.

Long-distance buses remain popular on routes where train tickets are quickly sold out and where the train station is located far from passenger destinations.

Since 2019, new bus routes longer than 800 km (500 miles) are restricted by law.

==== Hong Kong ====
There are numerous inter-city coach services between Hong Kong and various cities of Guangdong Province, e.g. Shenzhen, Guangzhou, Zhongshan and Zhuhai. These kinds of coaches are legally classified as a kind of non-franchised public bus, as "International Passenger Service".

In addition, there are some coach services which just carry passengers between the city of Hong Kong and the border crossing at Shenzhen, without entering the city centre in Shenzhen or further. These services are termed 'short-haul cross-boundary coach service' by the Transport Department which nearly the whole journey is within the limits of Hong Kong, as opposed to 'long-haul cross-boundary coach service' which runs between cities.

==== Indonesia ====
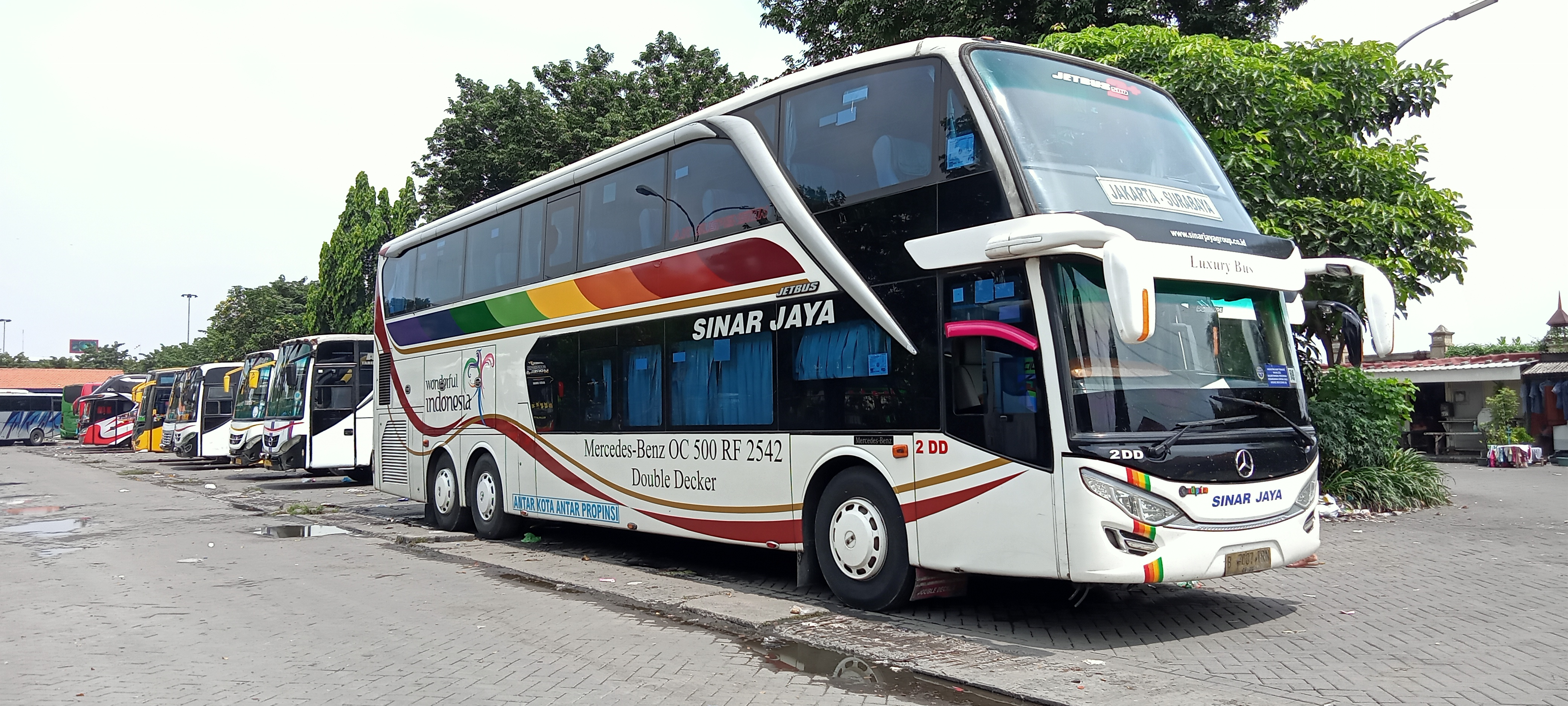
An Indonesian intercity bus, Sinar Jaya double decker Mercedes-Benz OC 500 RF 2542 bus travelling across Java, connecting Surabaya and Jakarta

As an archipelagic nation, travel between Indonesian cities are done mostly through air and sea travel. Intercity railways are available primarily in Java and Sumatra, while it is not available or underdeveloped in other parts of the country. Thus the intercity bus service has become the major provider of land transportation service connecting Indonesian cities, either within an island or inter-island connected through ferry crossings.

The intercity bus operator companies in Indonesian with several major companies operating mainly in Java, Kalimantan, (Note: Or also called Borneo by the international world.) Sulawesi, and Sumatra. The longest intercity bus service in Indonesia is a route operated by Antar Lintas Sumatera (ALS) connecting Medan in North Sumatra and Jember in East Java. It is a week long bus travel covering a distance of 2,920 kilometers.

The surge in intercity bus travel in Indonesia took place after the completion of Trans-Java highway section connecting Jakarta and Surabaya in 2018. During this time, some intercity bus services began operating fleet of double decker busses.

Besides regular domestic public transport, there is a bus company that serves the International route such as from Pontianak, Indonesia to Kuching, Malaysia and Bandar Seri Begawan, Brunei Darussalam in Borneo operated by state-owned bus company, DAMRI and some private operators. Another international bus service in Timor connects Kupang, Indonesia and Dili, Timor Leste.

==== Israel ====
Because of the weak-developed rail network and the small size of the country and the resulting low domestic air traffic, the long-distance bus cooperative Egged is the main public transport service in the country. Because of the widespread network, Egged is considered one of the largest bus companies in the world, in part because of the long-distance bus lines. However, in recent years Israel Railways has expanded and upgraded its route network and other companies have taken over routes previously served by Egged.

==== Japan ====
Intercity bus services in Japan include Kintetsu Bus and Willer Express.

==== Pakistan ====
Intercity bus transportation has risen dramatically in Pakistan due to the decline of Pakistan Railways and the unaffordable prices of airplanes for the average Pakistani. Numerous companies have started operating within the country such as Daewoo Express and Niazi Express, Manthar Bus Service and have gained considerable popularity due to their reliability, security and good service.

The expansion of motorway network and upgradation of national highways is a major cause of rise in intercity buses as the main mode for traveling between cities. Faisal Movers being the largest Intercity bus operator company in Pakistan, with the fleet of 750-850 buses which operate on more than 200 routes across all the country.

Smaller vans and mini buses are used for transportation in the mountainous north where narrow and dangerous roads make it impossible for the movement of larger buses. However, new motorways in Northern areas made it possible for companies like Faisal Movers and Daewoo Express to operate executive buses to Northern cities like Gilgit, Hazara and Skardu.

==== Taiwan ====
Intercity bus services in Taiwan typically drive on Controlled-access highways, so they are commonly referred to as "Highway Coaches" (Chinese name:國道客運). Examples include KBus (國光客運), UBus (統聯客運), and HoHsin (和欣客運).

==== Turkey ====
Turkey has an extensive network of intercity buses. Every part of the country is served. The buses are popular, comfortable and frequent. For example, there are over 150 departures from Istanbul to Ankara each day. The level of onboard service is very high, with free drinks and snacks on long-distance routes. Notable operators including Pamukkale, Kâmil Koç, Metro, and Ulusoy.

Kâmil Koç Buses Joint Stock Company was founded in 1926 by Turkish businessman Kamil Koç and is currently one of the most important bus companies in Turkey. The company, the pioneer of Turkish road transportation, was acquired by FlixBus in 2019. Kâmil Koç Buses A.Ş., which is among the 500 largest companies in, provides service with its bus terminals and branches in 60 provinces and 288 districts of Turkey The city where Kamil Koç provides the most intensive service is Istanbul.

=== Europe ===
In the EU, inter-city bus service is regulated by Regulation (EC) No 1073/2009 of the European Parliament and of the Council of 21 October 2009. As part of the regulation:

- carriers from all Member States should be guaranteed access to international transport markets without discrimination on grounds of nationality or place of establishment;
- regular services provided as part of a regular international service should be opened up to non-resident carriers (“cabotage”);
- authorization could be refused if the service would seriously affect the viability of a comparable service operated under one or more public service contracts (PSCs);
- administrative formalities should be reduced as far as possible.

According to the EU statistical pocketbook the European bus and coach fleet amount to 822,900 vehicles in 2013.

=== Finland ===
Finland has an extensive network of intercity coaches connecting different cities. They are generally slower than train travel. Formerly ExpressBus was a major operator. The local low cost coach company OnniBus.com offers cheap tickets. Intercity coaches have stops at towns and in more sparsely populated areas sometimes also in villages en route. Some services are operated on PSO contracts.

==== Germany ====
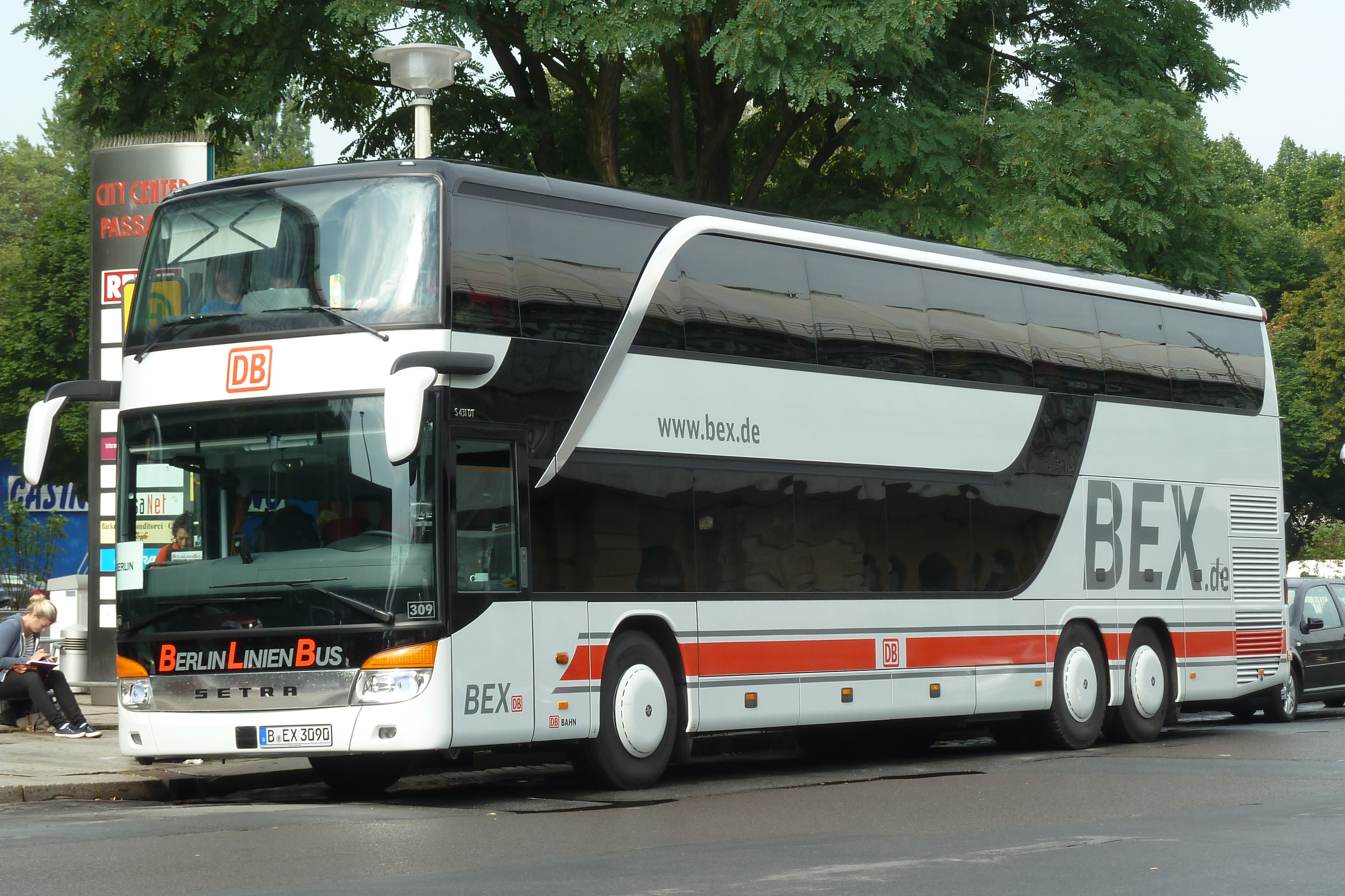
BEX intercity double-decker coach connecting Dresden and Berlin.

Intercity coach service in Germany became important in the decades following the Second World War, as the Deutsche Bundesbahn and the German federal post office operated numerous bus routes in major cities and metropolitan areas associated with each other. While rail was quicker and more convenient, the buses were a low-cost alternative. With the increasing prosperity of society and the growing use of the automobile, the demand fell significantly and most of these lines were abolished in the 1970s and 1980s.

One exception was traffic from and to (West-)Berlin. A long-distance bus network linking Berlin with Hamburg and several other German locations was created at the time of German division because of the small number of train services between the cities. It still exists today.

Until 2012 new long-distance bus lines could only be added in accordance with "Passenger Transportation Act" (PBefG), meaning if they did not compete with existing rail or bus lines. Since Germany – in contrast with many other European countries – has a well-developed rail network to all major cities and metropolitan areas, the domestic marketing of long-distance buses in Germany was much less significant than in many other countries.

The existing lines were often international lines as exist in almost all European countries, and for the transportation within Germany, there was a ban.

In 2012, the PBefG was amended, essentially allowing intercity bus services. Thus, since 1 January 2013 Coach services have been allowed if they are longer than 50 kilometers, which led to a fast-growing market with companies like Meinfernbus, Deinbus, Flixbus, ADAC Postbus, Berlin Linien Bus GmbH and City2City. Starting shortly after the establishment of the market a consolidation process occurred, which reduced the number of competing companies. ADAC Postbus became Postbus upon the ADAC leaving the cooperation. Meinfernbus and Flixbus fused to create a common company (currently the biggest operator of long-distance buses in Germany) while City2City folded operations. Ultimately market consolidation led to Flixbus operating over 90% of route kilometers offered by long-distance buses in Germany. However, shortly after achieving this nigh-monopoly, it was challenged by "BlaBlaBus" a subsidiary of BlaBlaCar entering the German market.

==== Greece ====
Since Greece's rail network was underdeveloped, intercity bus travel became important in the post-war years. The main bus operator in Greece is KTEL. It was founded in 1952.

==== Ireland ====
Generally slower than rail travel with refreshment and toilet stops required on longer routes. The main operators in the country are the state owned Bus Éireann and private operators, such as JJ Kavanagh and Sons, Aircoach and Citylink. The bus service between Dublin and Belfast is provided by Bus Éireann and Ulsterbus providing frequent service, including direct connections to Dublin Airport. Some bus services run overnight.

==== Latvia ====
Latvia has an extensive network of intercity coaches connecting different cities despite that there are no motorways in the whole country. They are generally slower and more expensive than train travel, but offering a more frequent service These intercity coaches have stops at villages en route, providing public transport for rural residents.

==== Netherlands ====
In the relatively small Netherlands there is a limited number of long-distance routes within the country. In 1994, the Interliner-network started with express buses on connections devoid of rail transport. Owing to high fares, a dense rail network and other reasons, the Interliner network fell apart into several different systems. In 2014, only a limited number of express buses existed as regular public transport usually under the name Qliner.

- 300 Groningen – Emmen Qbuzz
- 304 Groningen – Drachten Arriva
- 309 Groningen – Assen Qbuzz
- 312 Groningen – Stadskanaal Qbuzz
- 314 Groningen – Drachten Arriva
- 315 Groningen – Heerenveen – Emmeloord Arriva
- 320 Heereveen – Leeuwarden Arriva
- 322 Drachten – Oosterwolde Arriva
- 324 Groningen – Emmeloord Arriva
- 335 Bolsward – Groningen Arriva
- 350 Alkmaar – Leeuwarden Arriva
- 351 Alkmaar – Harlingen Arriva
- 355 Leeuwarden – Dokkum Arriva
- 361 Sassenheim – Schiphol Arriva
- 365 Leiden – Schiphol Arriva
- 380/381 Alphen aan den Rijn – Den Haag Arriva
- 382 Boskoop – Den Haag Arriva
- 383 Krimpen aan den Ijssel – Den Haag Arriva
- 385 Sassenheim – Den Haag Arriva
- 386 Oestgeest – Den Haag Arriva
- 387 Utrecht – Gorinchem Arriva
- 388 Utrecht – Dordrecht Arriva

Besides of regular public transport, a number of international bus companies serves Netherlands.

Company	From	To
Regiojet	Amsterdam Den Haag Rotterdam	Veel plaatsen in Europa
Flixbus	Amsterdam	Germany, Belgium, United Kingdom, France, Switzerland, Italy, Norway, Austria, Czech Republic, Romania
Ouibus	Amsterdam	Belgium, United Kingdom, France, Italy, Spain
IC-Bus (DB, Arriva)	Amsterdam	Germany

==== Norway ====
Norway has long-distance bus routes within the country. They operate in barely inhabited areas, including mountains, and affect the construction of a comprehensive railway network. Except in the Oslo area, Norway has only a rather sparse rail network, which extends north of the Arctic Circle to Fauske and Bodø, and to the north of Narvik with a connection to the Swedish rail network. In addition to this network, they provide public passenger transport by many more companies within Norway than airlines, shipping lines (including the Hurtigruten) and bus lines, including many long-distance bus lines.

The buses used in the north of the country (especially in the county of Finnmark) have both a passenger compartment and a freight compartment in the rear: many remote villages are connected to the outside world only by these buses, thus achieving a large part of the cargo by bus to the city.

==== Poland ====
Major intercity bus services in Poland include the international company FlixBus, Polish operators like Sindbad and Polonus, and regional services such as PKS (Polskie Koleje Państwowe). Other notable companies include Agat, Leo Express, and regional operators like Szwagropol and Majer Bus, which serve specific areas.

==== Switzerland ====
Switzerland has an extremely dense network of interconnected rail, bus and ship lines, including some long-distance bus lines. Although Switzerland is a mountainous country, the rail network is denser than Germany's. Switzerland is an exception to the rule that long-distance bus lines are established especially in countries with inadequate railway network, or in areas with low population density. Some of the railway and main bus routes on Italian territory also serve to shorten the distance between Swiss towns. From Germany lines run from Frankfurt am Main, Heidelberg, Karlsruhe to Basel and Lucerne.

Long-distance bus services in Switzerland:

- Saas-Fee – Brig – Simplon Pass – Domodossola ("Napoleon Route" a rail connection to Locarno)
- Lugano – Menaggio on Lake Como – Tirano rail connection to St. Moritz and Chur
- St. Moritz – Chiavenna – Menaggio on Lake Como – Lugano. ("Palm Express")
- Chur – Thusis – Splügen GR – San Bernardino GR – Bellinzona
- Davos – Zernez – Mals (Malle)
- Disentis / Muster – Bellinzona
- Flüelen – Andermatt – Airolo – Bellinzona

==== United Kingdom ====
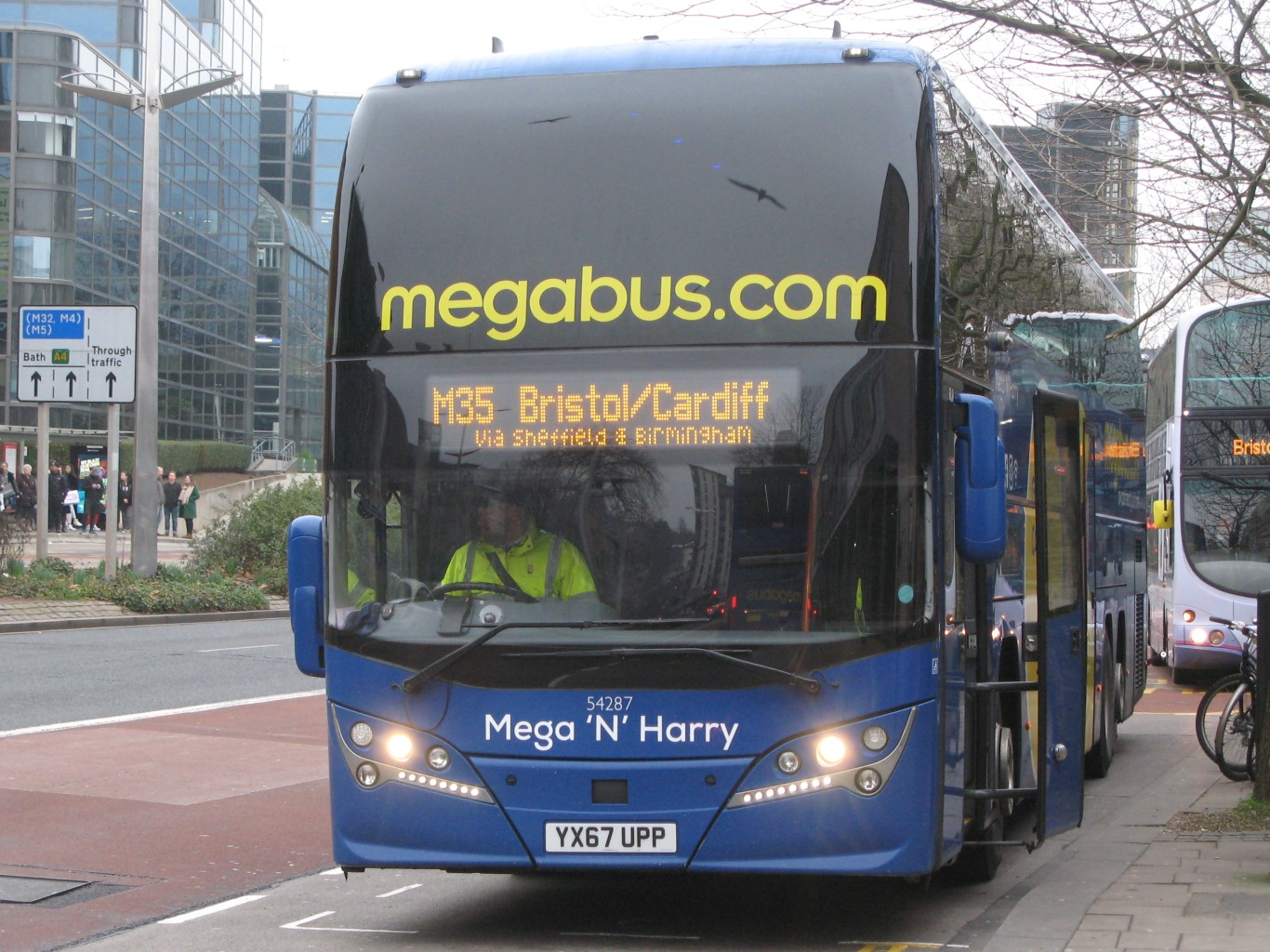
A coach operated by Megabus

There is an extensive network of scheduled coach transport in the United Kingdom. However, passenger numbers are a fraction of those travelling by railway. Coach travel companies often require passengers to purchase tickets in advance of travel. The distinction between bus and coach services is not absolute; some coach services, especially in Scotland, operate as local bus services over sections of route where there is no other bus service.

National Express has operated services under that name since 1972. Megabus started in 2004 and Greyhound UK in 2009, with several other operators. Receipts in 2004 were £1.8 billion (2008 prices) and grew significantly between 1980 and 2010. Ulsterbus connects places in Northern Ireland which are no longer on the railway network.

==== Former Yugoslavia ====
Intercity bus travel in Serbia, as well as in other countries of former Yugoslavia, is very popular in proportion to travel by rail and air. In some regions, data has shown that intercity bus routes have transported over ten times the number of passengers carried by intercity trains on the same competing routes. It has been a trend around Serbia and the Balkan region that small towns and some villages have their own flagship bus carrier, often branded with the last name of the family whose owner runs that bus company. Belgrade, the capital of Serbia, and Zagreb, the capital of Croatia, have very large central bus terminals that operate 24 hours a day. The largest intercity bus operator in the whole region is Lasta Beograd which operates from Serbia to many countries in Europe.

== See also ==
- Bus station
- Intercity bus driver
- List of bus operating companies
- Multi-axle bus
