= Thirunagar (disambiguation) =

Thirunagar may refer to:

- Thirunagar, Erode, a major residential area in the city of Erode in Tamil Nadu, India
- Thirunagar, Madurai, a major urban area near the city of Madurai in Tamil Nadu, India
- Thiruvali-Thirunagari, a pair of Hindu temples in Tamil Nadu, India

== See also ==
- Srinagar (disambiguation)
