= Heliopolis =

Heliopolis (Greek for "Sun City") may refer to:

== Places ==
- Heliopolis (ancient Egypt), also known as Heliopolis in Augustamnica
- Heliopolis, Cairo, a suburb or district of Cairo, Egypt
  - Heliopolis Sporting Club
  - Heliopolis University in Cairo
  - New Heliopolis
- Heliopolis (Lebanon), ancient city also known as Heliopolis Syriaca, Roman Heliopolis, or Heliopolis in Phoenicia; at modern Baalbek in Lebanon
- Heliopolis (Athens suburb) or Ilioupoli, a suburb of Athens, Greece
- Heliópolis, the largest favela of São Paulo City, Brazil
- Heliópolis, Bahia, a municipality in Bahia, Brazil
- Héliopolis, Algeria, a town and commune in Algeria
- Héliopolis, a town in France situated on the Levant Island
- Heliópolis, Seville, neighbourhood of the Bellavista-La Palmera district in Seville, Spain

=== Fictional places ===
- Heliopolis (Marvel Comics), a location in Marvel comics
- Heliopolis, a planet in the Stargate SG-1 episode "The Torment of Tantalus"

== Literature ==
- Heliopolis (Jünger novel), a 1949 novel by Ernst Jünger
- Heliopolis (Scudamore novel), a 2009 novel by James Scudamore

== Music ==
- "Heliopolis", a song by Agathodaimon from Phoenix
- "Heliopolis", a song by Banco de Gaia from Maya
- "Heliopolis", a song by Steve Kilbey from Unearthed
- "Heliopolis", a song by Samael from Reign of Light
- "Heliopolis", a song by Franz Schubert
- "Heliopolis", a song by Spyro Gyra from Morning Dance

== Others ==
- Heliopolis style, the architectural style of the modern Heliopolis Cairo suburb
- Heliopolis (2009 film), a 2009 musical docudrama film by Ahmad Abdalla
- Héliopolis (2020 film), a 2020 Algerian film
- Heliopolis (horse), a British thoroughbred racehorse
- SS Heliopolis, steamships

== See also ==
- Ennead of Heliopolis
- Heliopolitan Triad
- Heliopolitan gods in comics
- Sun City (disambiguation)
- City of the Sun (disambiguation)
- Helios (disambiguation)
- Helepolis
