= Frédéric Mazzella =

French entrepreneur

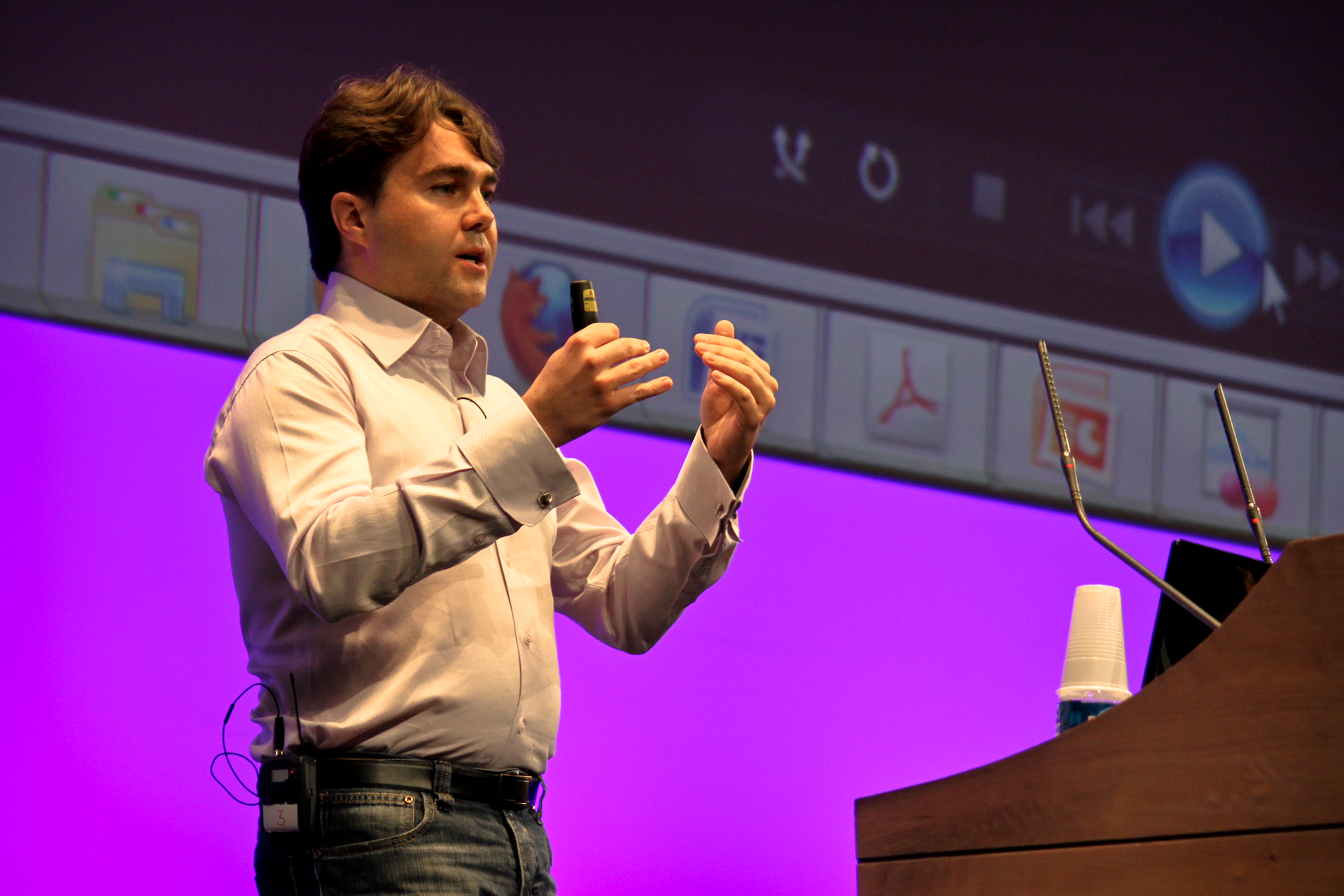
- Born: March 9, 1976 (age 50); Nantes, France
- Education: Lycée Henri IV; École Normale Supérieure; Stanford University; INSEAD, MBA
- Known for: Founder of BlaBlaCar

Frédéric Mazzella (born March 9, 1976) is a French entrepreneur and the founder of BlaBlaCar, an online marketplace for carpools.

== Early life and education ==
Mazzella underwent classical piano training and received education at some of the best schools in France. After majoring in maths, physics and chemistry at the Lycée Henri IV, he received a Master of Physics at the École Normale Supérieure (Normale Sup). While studying at Normale Sup, he received an internship in the robotics department of Stanford University, where he worked on designing a virtual tool to enable surgeons on NASA spaceflights to practice procedures before performing them on astronauts. In 1999, he enrolled at Stanford in a master's program in computer science.

Mazzella also obtained an MBA from INSEAD which he credits for helping him learn how to manage the then-young BlaBlaCar venture.

== Career ==
After completing his degree, he returned to Paris and began working for Kabira. At Kabira, Frédéric moved from Support to Project Management and Pre-Sales. He also composed the music for the on-hold tone on the in-house phone system. In 1999, he also worked as a consultant for Blue Pumpkin, and in 2000, he worked as a research assistant for Nippon Telegraph and Telephone in Japan.

In September 2015, Mazzella was ranked 49th on the WIRED list of top 100 digital influencers.

=== BlaBlaCar ===
In December 2003, Mazzella wanted to travel from Paris to visit his family in the French countryside for Christmas but he did not own a car and the trains were fully booked. After his sister made a 150-kilometer detour to collect him, he noticed that most cars going in his direction did not have any passengers. During nights and weekends, he began working on creating a concept to address the issue. In 2006, he bought a website called Covoiturage.fr (French for "carpooling").

In 2007, Mazzella enrolled at the Master of Business Administration program at INSEAD.

In 2008, along with Francis Nappez and Nicolas Brusson, he launched BlaBlaCar. In 2015, BlaBlaCar raised $200m, bringing total funding to over $300m and valuing the company at $1.6bn.
