= BlaBlaCar Bus =

French intercity bus company

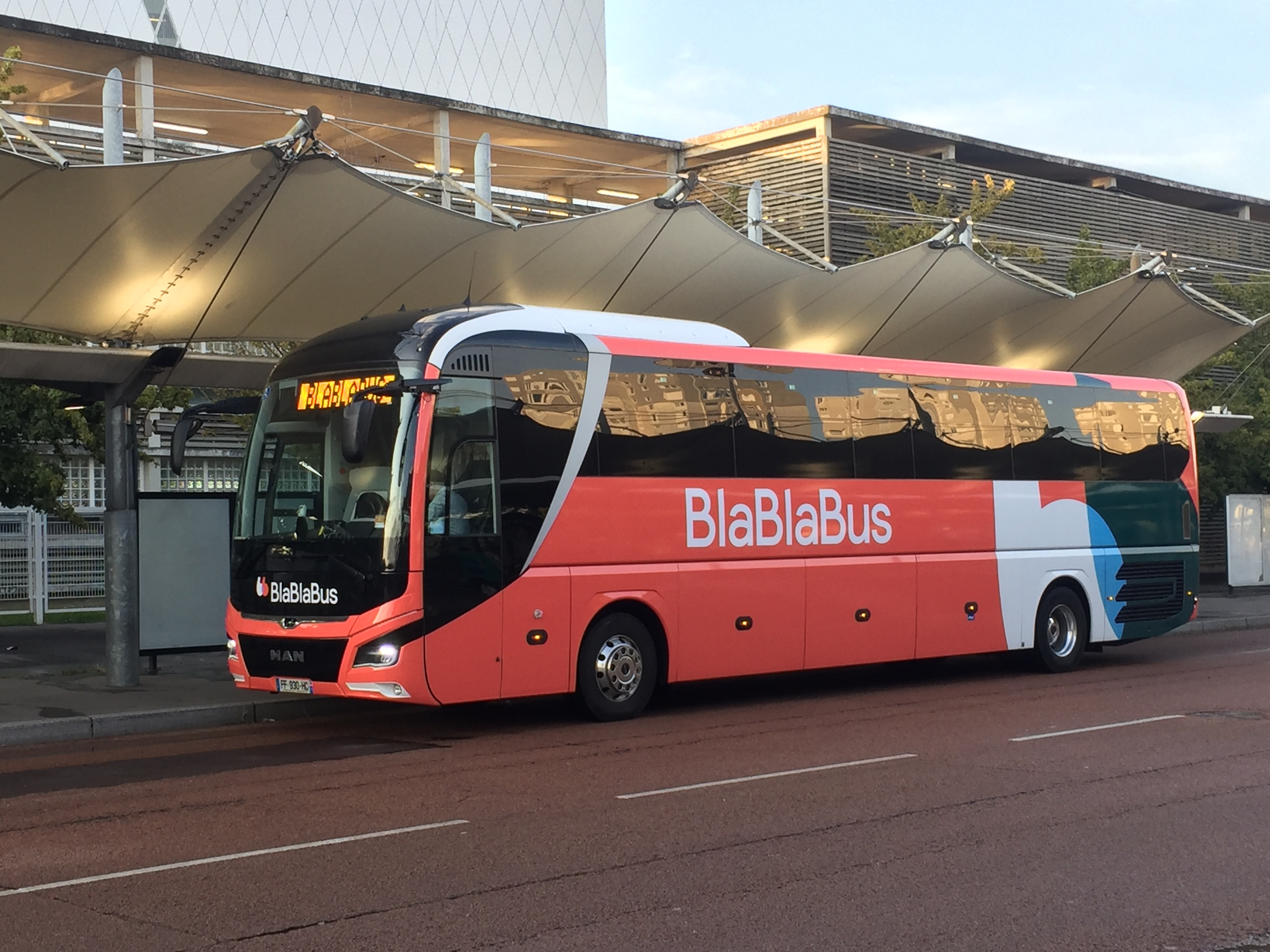
- BlaBlaCar Bus in Saint-Denis
- Parent: BlaBlaCar
- Founded: 2012
- Defunct: 2026
- Service area: Western Europe
- Service type: Intercity coach service
- Alliance: ALSA; National Express
- Hubs: Paris-Bercy; Lyon-Perrache; Lille-Europe
- Fleet: 46 coaches
- Chief executive: Maria Harti
- Website: www.blablacar.co.uk/bus

BlaBlaCar Bus, formerly BlaBlaBus, Ouibus and iDBUS, operates intercity coach services in Europe. It serves Aix-en-Provence, Amsterdam, Barcelona, Brussels, Genoa, Lille, London, Lyon, Marseille, Milan, Nice, Paris, Paris Charles de Gaulle Airport, San Sebastián and Turin. The route network is expanding progressively. BlaBlaCar Bus has three major hubs; Paris-Bercy, Lyon-Perrache and Lille-Europe. Founded in 2012 by SNCF, in November 2018 it was announced that it would be purchased by BlaBlaCar and its name was BlaBlaBus and in 2021 it rebranded as BlaBlaCar Bus. It is to cease operations in 2026.

== History ==
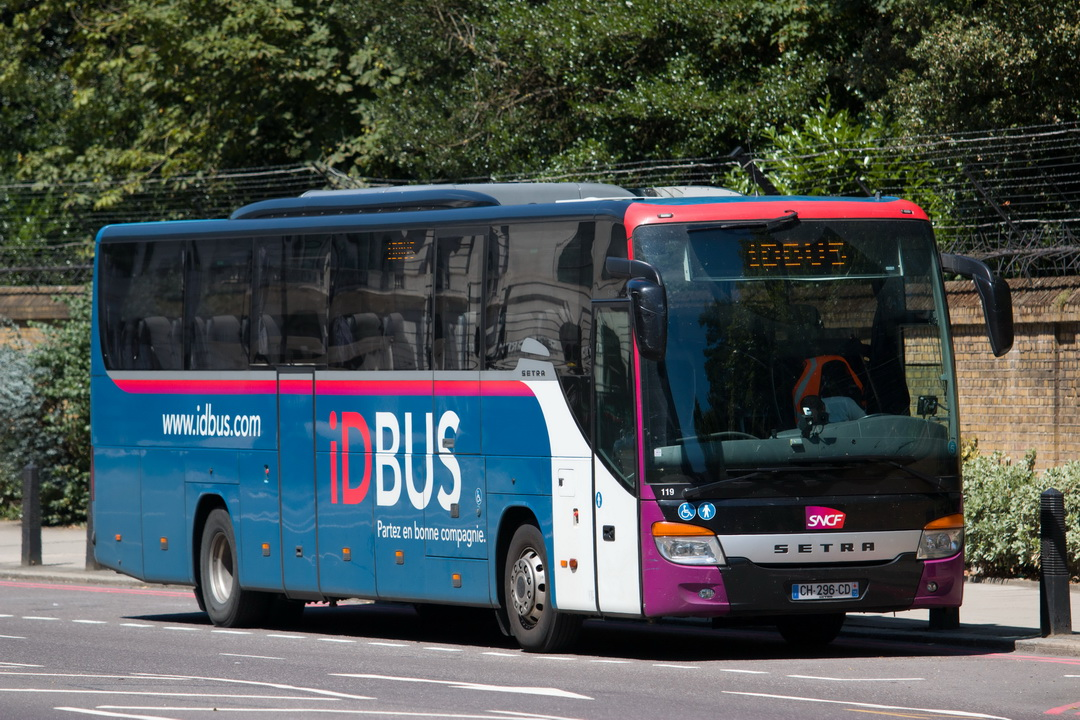
A Setra with the iDBUS logo that was used from 2012 to 2015

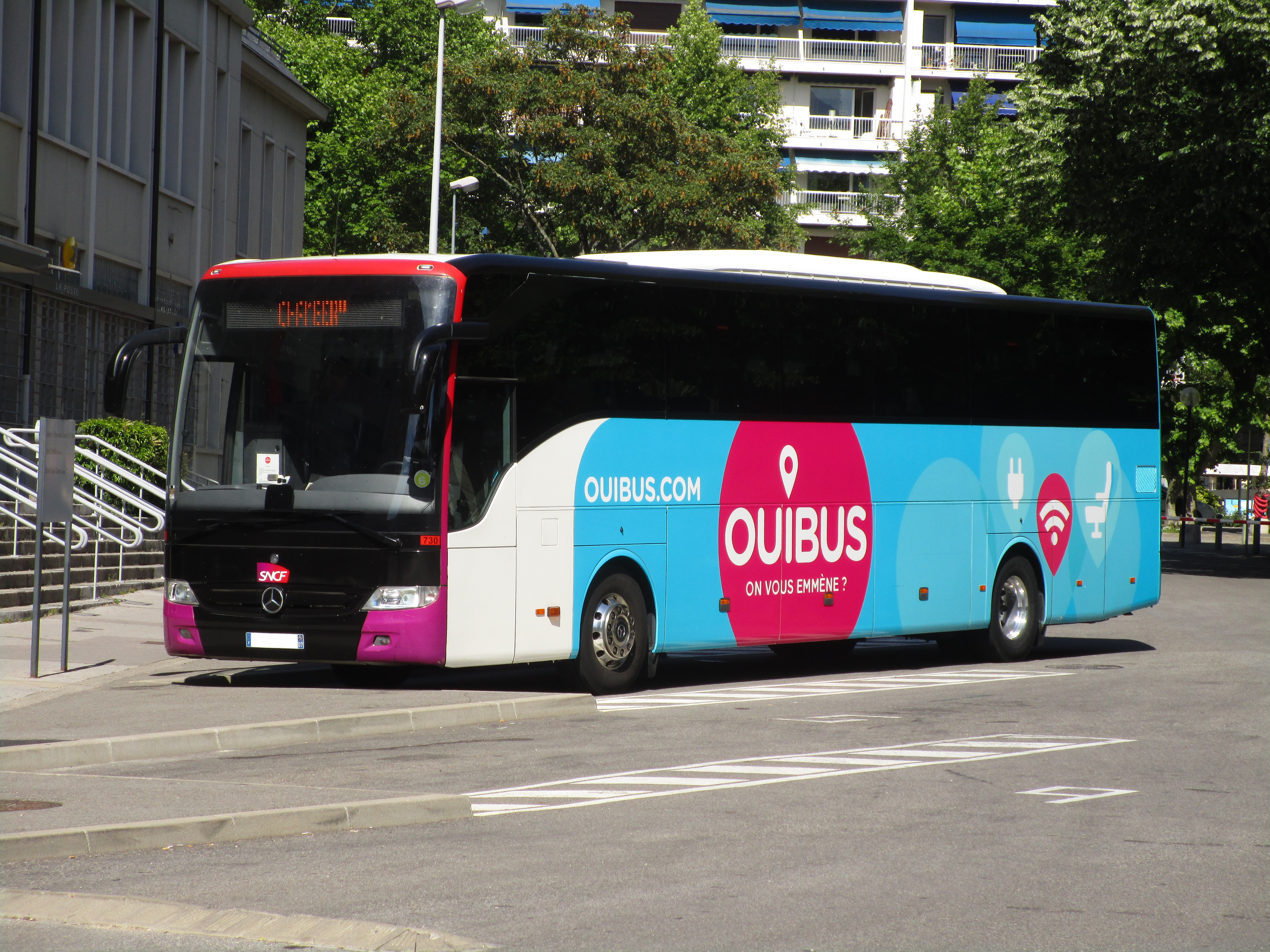
A Mercedes-Benz Tourismo with the Ouibus logo that was used from 2015 to 2018

iDBUS was launched on 23 July 2012 with services to Amsterdam, London and Brussels from the original hub at Paris-Bercy. A domestic service between Paris and Lille was launched on 29 August 2012.

A second hub was created at Lyon-Perrache on 17 December 2012 to launch Milan and Turin destinations. On 23 May 2013, iDBUS began operating services between Marseille and Nice, Genoa and Milan. On 28 April 2014 iDBUS launched a service from Brussels to Amsterdam, London and Charles de Gaulle Airport.

On 1 December 2014, iDBUS started operating into Germany, with a service from Paris to Brussels, Aachen and Cologne. From 15 June 2015 iDBUS expanded further in the Benelux region, with Rotterdam and Antwerp added to the network. On the same date, a London to Lyon route started.

On 3 September 2015, iDBUS was rebranded Ouibus. In July 2016, the Starshipper business was purchased.

In February 2018, Ouibus entered a partnership with ALSA and National Express. In November 2018, it was announced the business would be purchased by BlaBlaCar.

Entering the German market in 2020, BlaBlaCar Bus became the first major competitor of FlixBus since that company had achieved a nigh-monopoly in the German long-distance bus market through market consolidation, mergers and acquisition of competitors.

In April 2026 BlaBlaCar announced on 21 April 2026 that BlaBlaCar Bus would cease trading by the end of 2026.

== Accident ==
On 10 April 2022, an accident happened close to Antwerp, Belgium. Two occupants of the bus were instantly killed, whilst several others were left in a life-threatening condition. The driver of the bus tested positive for drugs just after the accident. Police also stated that the driver of the bus was known for drug offences in the past.
