= BlaBlaCar =

Ridesharing website

- Type: Privately held company
- Industry: transport
- Founded: 16 September 2006; 19 years ago
- Founders: Frédéric Mazzella; Francis Nappez; Nicolas Brusson; Nicolas Deroche
- Headquarters: Paris, France
- Area served: Belgium, Brazil, Croatia, Czechia, France, Germany, Hungary, India, Italy, Luxembourg, Mexico, Netherlands, Poland, Portugal, Romania, Russia, Serbia, Slovakia, Spain, Turkey, Ukraine, and United Kingdom
- Services: Carpooling
- Revenue: €250,000,000 (2023)
- Owner: Comuto S.A.
- Members: 100 million (2022)
- Number of employees: 600
- Website: www.blablacar.co.uk, www.blablacar.in

BlaBlaCar is a French ridesharing company headquartered in Paris. It also operates BlaBlaCar Bus, an intercity bus service. The platform has 26 million active members and is available in Europe and Latin America.

The service is named for its rating scale for drivers' preferred level of chattiness in the car: "Bla" for not very chatty, "BlaBla" for someone who likes to talk, and "BlaBlaBla" for those who can't keep quiet.

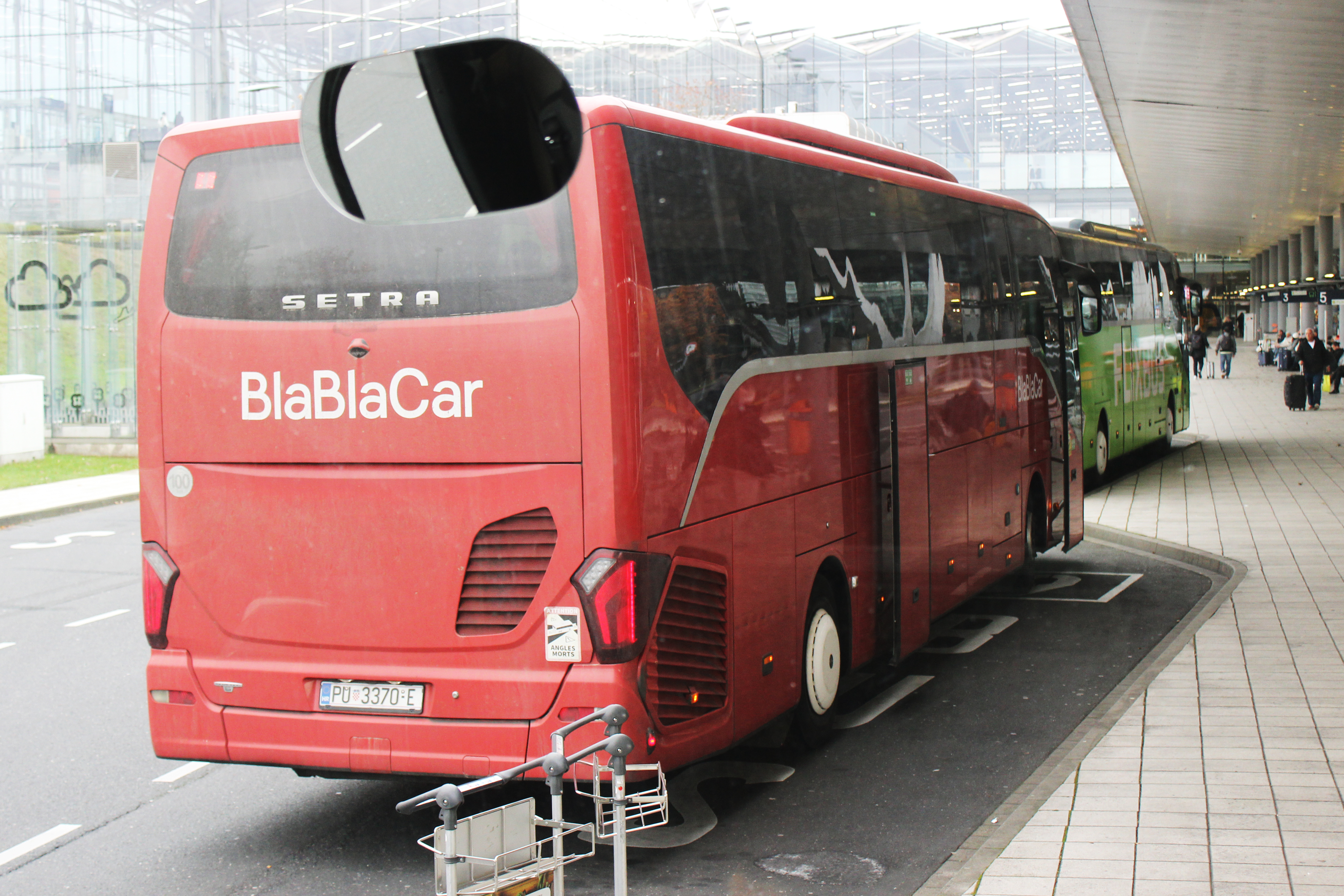
BlaBlaCar Bus at Cologne Bonn Airport Bus Stop

== History ==
In December 2003, Frédéric Mazzella wanted to travel from Paris to visit his family in the French countryside for Christmas, but he did not own a car and the trains were fully booked. After his sister made a 150-kilometer detour to collect him, he noticed that most cars going in his direction did not have any passengers. During nights and weekends, he began working on creating a concept to address the issue. In 2006, he bought a website called Covoiturage.fr, French for "carpooling", created in 2004. By September 2008, it was the largest carpool website in France.

In June 2011, it introduced BlaBlaCar.com in the United Kingdom.

In June 2012, an online reservation service was added to Covoiturage.fr. The web service put in place its business model and began to make profits. It was also a way to attract drivers and to reach the critical mass. Between July and November, Comuto expanded to Italy, Portugal, Poland, Netherlands, Luxembourg, and Belgium.

In April 2013, BlaBlaCar was launched in Germany. Covoiturage.fr was re-branded BlaBlaCar.fr.

In January 2014, BlaBlaCar was introduced in Ukraine and Russia. As of June 2024 BlaBlaCar is still offering its services in Russia.

In September 2014, the service had 10 million users.

In January 2015, BlaBlaCar expanded to India. The company bought multiple competitors, including Carpooling in Germany, Autohop in Central Europe, and Rides in Mexico, expanding to Latin America.

In April 2017, a long term rental service was offered to the best drivers. It was the result of a partnership with the constructor Opel and ALD Automotive, specializing in long term rental.

On 2 May 2017, BlaBlaLines, an application for daily carpool, was launched in France.

In 2017, the company closed its offices in India, Turkey and Mexico. Executives said they had spent too much and hired too aggressively in those territories. Overall, the company has become far more diversified in terms of geography. While 75% of its users were in France in 2015, by 2021 the company reported that 80% of its riders were outside of France and 60% were outside of Europe.

In 2021, bus seats represented 20% of all bookings on the BlaBlaCar platform.

== Acquisition ==
In April 2018, the company acquired Less, which launched four months earlier.

In November 2018, BlaBlaCar announced the purchase of long-distance coach operator Ouibus from SNCF. As part of the transaction, SNCF became a shareholder in BlaBlaCar. Ouibus was rebranded BlaBlaBus and BlaBlaCar also raised $114 million from SNCF and previous investors. In 2019, BlaBlaCar acquired Russia's largest bus booking platform, Busfor.

In April 2021, the company acquired Octobus, a Ukrainian company that develops software for bus operators to manage their finances and ticket sales.

In March 2023, the company acquired Klaxit, a French startup enabling carpools on work commutes.

== Funding ==
In 2009, the company raised €600,000 from the founders and their friends and family.

In June 2010, Comuto raised €1.25 million from ISAI run by Jean-David Chamboredon.

In January 2012, Comuto raised €7.5 million from Accel Partners, ISAI and Cabiedes & Partners to develop its activities in Europe.

In July 2014, BlaBlaCar raised US$100 million from Index Ventures. In September 2015, the company raised US$200 million, primarily from Insight Venture Partners, in a round that valued the company at $1.6 billion.

In April 2021, BlaBlaCar raised $115 million.

== Critics ==
In March 2022, BlaBlaCar announced the suspension of investments in its Russian subsidiary due to the geopolitical situation. The company halted all financial flows between its headquarters and the Russian unit, isolating the Russian operations from the rest of the company and ceasing all development plans in the country. Despite these measures, BlaBlaCar's Russian platform continues to function under the independent management of its local team, maintaining existing services for users.
