= Sunshine City =

Sunshine City may refer to:

- Sunshine City, Ma On Shan, a property development in Ma On Shan, New Territories, Hong Kong
- Sunshine City, Tokyo, a building complex in Ikebukuro, Tokyo
- St. Petersburg, Florida, United States, nicknamed Florida's Sunshine City
- Sunshine City (album), an album by Australian music group TV Rock
- Sunshine City (TV series), a Canadian comedy mystery television series

== See also ==
- Sun City (disambiguation)
