= Surajpur =

Surajpur may refer to:

- Surajpur, Budaun, a village in Ambiapur Block (district subdivision), Budaun district, Uttar Pradesh, India
- Surajpur, Chhattisgarh, a town in central India
- Surajpur district, a district in the Indian state of Chhattisgarh
- Surajpur, Pakistan, a town in the Punjab province of Pakistan

== See also ==
- Surajpura (disambiguation)
- Suryapura (disambiguation)
- Sun City (disambiguation), literal translation of Surajpur
