= Butterhuizen =

Coordinates: 52°39′N 4°49′E

Butterhuizen (West Frisian: Butterhúze), part of the former municipality of Heerhugowaard, is a neighbourhood of Heerhugowaard and a former hamlet in the province of North Holland, the Netherlands. Since 2022 it has been part of the new municipality of Dijk en Waard.

Butterhuizen lies to the south of Heerhugowaard. It has about 1,200 houses, and was built during the late 1980s and early 1990s, all the construction work being finished in late 1993. Since 1994 all the streets have been paved.
