= SS Heliopolis =

SS Heliopolis is the name of the following ships:

- SS Heliopolis (1905), renamed RFA Maine in 1914
- SS Heliopolis (1907), renamed Royal George in 1910, scrapped in 1922

== See also ==
- Heliopolis (disambiguation)
