= Srinagar (disambiguation) =

Srinagar may refer to:

- Srinagar, summer capital of Jammu and Kashmir, India
- Srinagar District, Jammu and Kashmir, India, includes Srinagar city and Dal Lake
- Srinagar, Uttarakhand, a city in Uttarakhand, India
- Sreenagar Upazila, a town in Bangladesh

== See also ==
- Thirunagar (disambiguation)
- Suryapura (disambiguation), former name of Srinagar
- Srinagara Kitty (born 1977), Indian actor
