= Sun City =

Sun City may refer to:

== Places ==
=== United States ===
- Sun City, Arizona, Del Webb's original "Sun City" development, and model for subsequent communities
- Sun City Festival (Buckeye, Arizona)
- Sun City, California
- Sun City Center, Florida
- Sun City, Florida
- Sun City, Kansas
- Sun City, Summerlin, Nevada
- Sun City, Hilton Head, South Carolina
- Sun City, Texas
- Sun City West, Arizona
- A nickname of El Paso, Texas

=== Other places ===
- Sun City (South Africa), a luxury casino resort, situated in the North West Province of South Africa
- Translation of Cité Soleil, a Haitian commune
- A nickname of Cagliari, Sardinia
- Literal translation of Ilioupoli, Greece
- A nickname of Szeged, Hungary
- A nickname of Écija, Spain ("la ciudad del sol")

== Television ==
- Sun City (TV series)

== Music ==
- "Sun City" (song), a 1985 protest song by Artists United Against Apartheid
- Sun City (album), a 1985 album by Artists United Against Apartheid
- Sun City Girls, American rock band
- Suncity, a 2018 EP by American singer Khalid

== See also ==
- Heliopolis (disambiguation)
- City of the Sun (disambiguation)
- Sun City Agreement of the Second Congo War, signed 2002 in Sun City, South Africa
- Sunshine City (disambiguation)
- Suryapura (disambiguation), Surajpur (disambiguation), Surajpura (disambiguation); Sun City in Indic languages
