= Suryanagar =

Village in Maharashtra

- village
- Location in Maharashtra, India Suryanagar (India)
- Coordinates: 19.9269839°N 72.9844401°E
- Country: India
- State: Maharashtra
- District: Palghar
- Taluka: Dahanu
- Elevation: 63 m (207 ft)

Population (2011)
  - Total: 786
- Time zone: UTC+5:30 (IST)
- ISO 3166 code: IN-MH
- 2011 census code: 551694

Suryanagar is a village in the Palghar district of Maharashtra, India. It is located in the Dahanu taluka.

== Demographics ==
According to the 2011 census of India, Suryanagar has 112 households. The effective literacy rate (i.e. the literacy rate of population excluding children aged 6 and below) is 92.86%.

Demographics (2011 Census)
	Total	Male	Female
Population	786	436	350
Children aged below 6 years	58	36	22
Scheduled caste	44	18	26
Scheduled tribe	514	303	211
Literates	676	370	306
Workers (all)	126	102	24
Main workers (total)	105	94	11
Main workers: Cultivators	3	2	1
Main workers: Agricultural labourers	3	3	0
Main workers: Household industry workers	21	20	1
Main workers: Other	78	69	9
Marginal workers (total)	21	8	13
Marginal workers: Cultivators	2	0	2
Marginal workers: Agricultural labourers	4	4	0
Marginal workers: Household industry workers	2	0	2
Marginal workers: Others	13	4	9
Non-workers	660	334	326
