= Heliópolis, Bahia =

Municipality of Bahia, Brazil

Coordinates: 10°40′58″S 38°17′09″W

Heliópolis
- Municipality
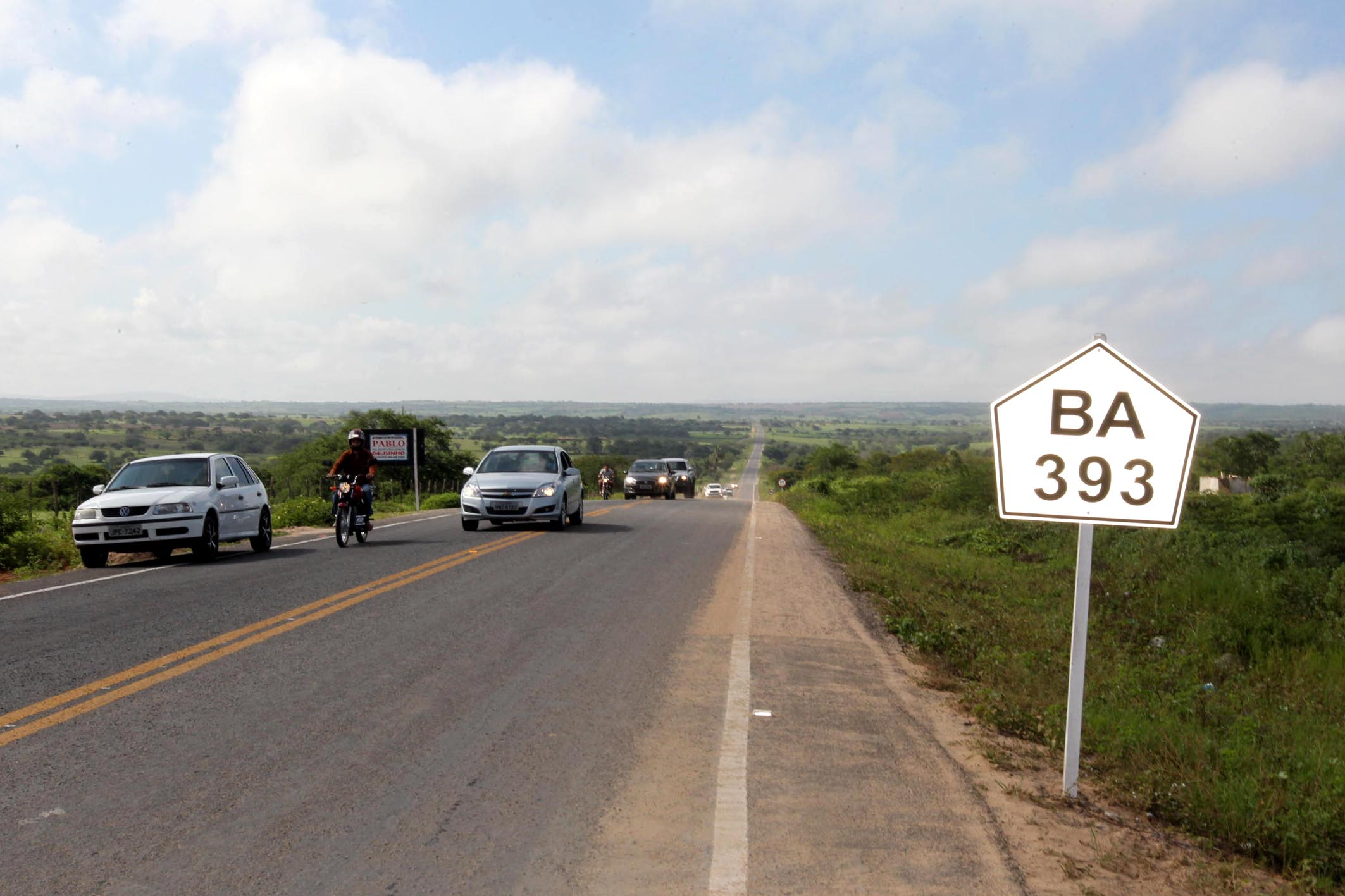
- View of Heliópolis, Bahia

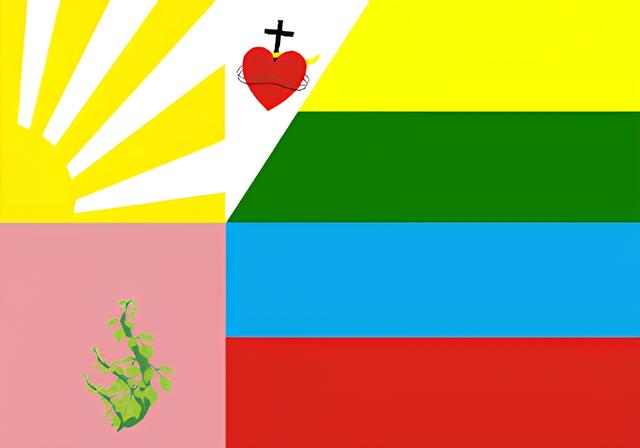
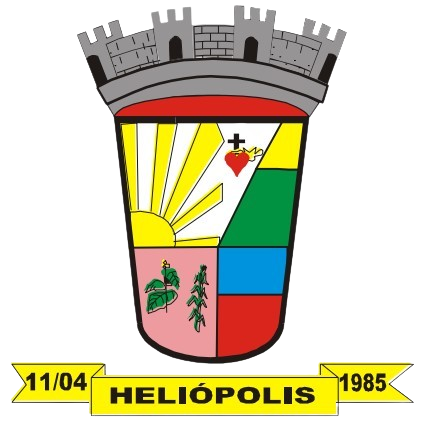
- Flag Coat of arms

- Country: Brazil
- Region: Nordeste
- State: Bahia

Population (2020)
  - Total: 12,987
- Time zone: UTC−3 (BRT)

Heliópolis is a municipality in the state of Bahia in the North-East region of Brazil.
