= Suryapura, Rupandehi =

Suryapura सूर्यपुरा
- Village development committee
- Location in Nepal
- Coordinates: 27.58°N 83.31°E
- Country: Nepal
- Province: Lumbini Province
- District: Rupandehi District

Population (2011)
  - Total: 20,773
- Time zone: UTC+5:45 (Nepal Time)

Suryapura is a village development committee in Rupandehi District in Lumbini Province of southern Nepal. At the time of the 1991 Nepal census it had a population of 13,701.

At the time 2011 A.D total population of suryapura V.D.C was 20,773 and Male=10,396 and Female = 10,377 and total household was 3,212 . Source of Central Bureau of Statistics Kathmandu, government of Nepal . there are many religion follow people like hindu muslim christian . many people engages in agriculture but some people engages in government job like teachers, official job.

== Available services ==
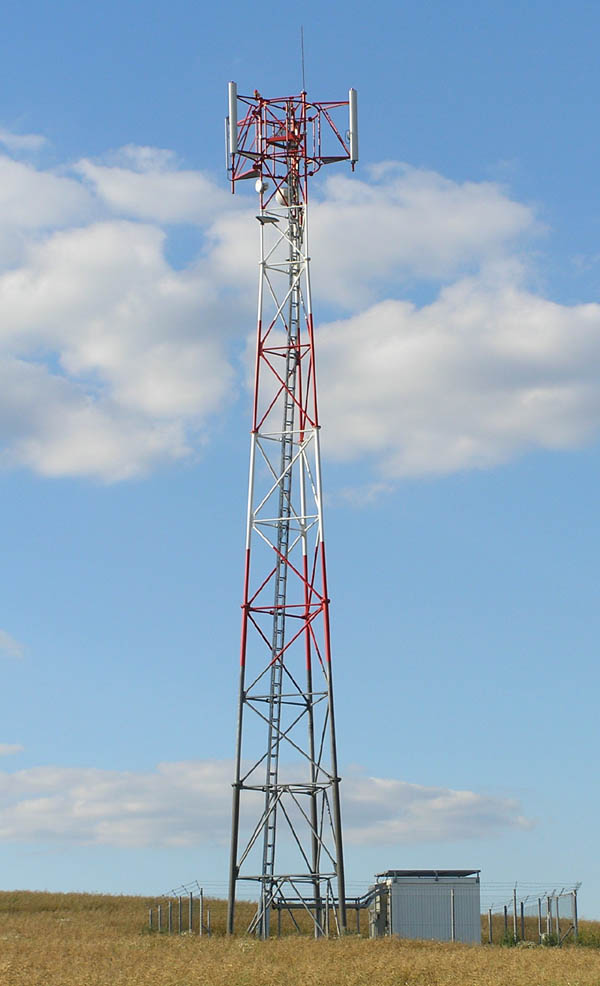
2G 3G cell tower

3G Network of Ncell and Nepal Telecom Electricity , Wide road, Schools college , Health post , Police station , Post office and private Bank .
