= Stad van de Zon =

Coordinates: 52°38′48″N 4°48′32″E

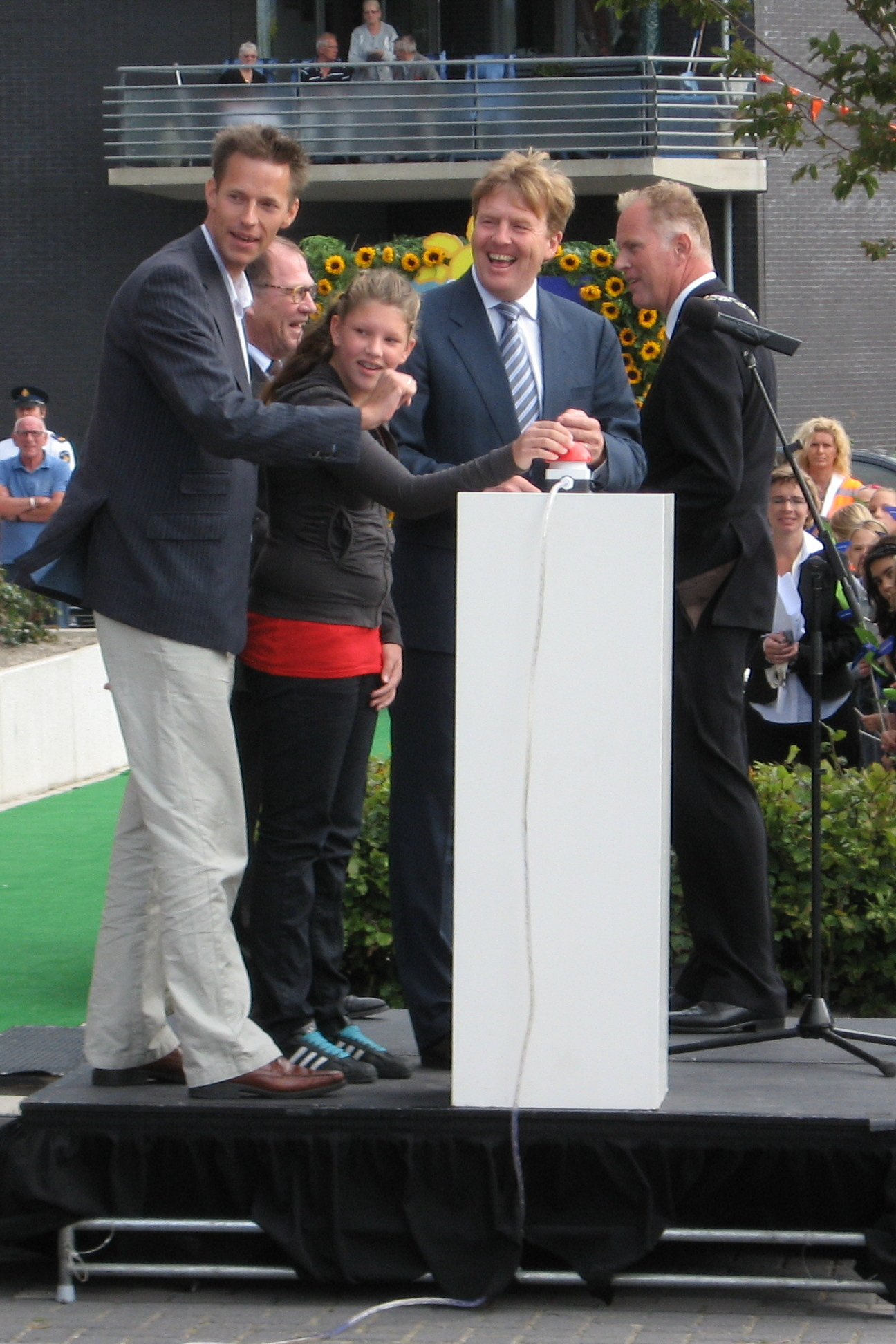
Official opening by prince Willem-Alexander on 23 September 2009

Stad van de Zon (City of the Sun) is a housing and building project in Heerhugowaard, The Netherlands, based on a concept developed by Bert Smolders, then urban planner with Kuiper Compagnons, and further realized by the architect and urban planner Ashok Bhalotra.

The goal was and is to build homes that are directed towards the sun, and that a big part of the energy used by those homes is provided by solar power. This way, the project is to become the first carbon neutral as well as the largest photovoltaic neighbourhood worldwide.

As of 2007, about 1,500 residential homes have been completed.
