= Surajpura, Bhopal =

Surajpura
- village
- Etymology: Sun Town
- Location within Madhya Pradesh Location within India
- Coordinates: 23°52′48″N 77°14′27″E
- Country: India
- State: Madhya Pradesh
- District: Bhopal
- Tehsil: Berasia

Population (2011)
  - Total: 1,061
- Time zone: UTC+5:30 (IST)
- ISO 3166 code: MP-IN
- Census code: 482043

Surajpura is a village in the Bhopal district of Madhya Pradesh, India. It is located in the Berasia tehsil.

== Demographics ==
According to the 2011 census of India, Surajpura has 248 households. The effective literacy rate (i.e. the literacy rate of population excluding children aged 6 and below) is 58.28%.

Demographics (2011 Census)
	Total	Male	Female
Population	1061	560	501
Children aged below 6 years	203	107	96
Scheduled caste	188	105	83
Scheduled tribe	3	1	2
Literates	500	352	148
Workers (all)	591	323	268
Main workers (total)	452	297	155
Main workers: Cultivators	328	212	116
Main workers: Agricultural labourers	98	67	31
Main workers: Household industry workers	3	1	2
Main workers: Other	23	17	6
Marginal workers (total)	139	26	113
Marginal workers: Cultivators	92	13	79
Marginal workers: Agricultural labourers	38	9	29
Marginal workers: Household industry workers	3	2	1
Marginal workers: Others	6	2	4
Non-workers	470	237	233
