= City of the Sun (Maio novel) =

2014 novel by Juliana Maio

- First edition book cover
- Author: Juliana Maio
- Language: English
- Subject: World War II
- Genre: Historical fiction; spy fiction; romance
- Set in: Cairo, Egypt
- Publisher: Greenleaf Book Group
- Publication date: March 2014
- Media type: Print; digital
- ISBN: 978-1626340671

City of the Sun is a novel by Juliana Maio, published by Greenleaf Book Group in March 2014. The novel, which blends historical fiction with spy fiction and romantic fiction, is set in Cairo, Egypt in 1941 during the North Africa Campaign of World War II. Though a work of fiction, it centers around true historical events and "connects the root of much of today's turmoil in the Middle East with the Axis-Allied struggle for control of the Suez Canal and the early history of the Muslim Brotherhood."

The author was born to a Jewish family in Heliopolis, a suburb of Cairo. Her family was expelled in 1956 during the Suez Crisis, when she was three years old. Maio grew up and was educated in Paris, France before her family emigrated to the United States.
