= Thirunagar Colony, Erode =

Thirunagar
- neighbourhood
- Interactive map of Thirunagar
- Coordinates: 11°20′59″N 77°43′33″E
- Country: India
- State: Tamil Nadu
- District: Erode

Languages
  - Official: Tamil
- Time zone: UTC+5:30 (IST)
- PIN: 638003
- Telephone code: 91-424
- Vehicle registration: TN-86

Thirunagar is a residential area in the city of Erode. It is also known as Thirunagar Colony. It is 2 km from the central bus station, 5 km from Pallipalayam and 5 km from Erode Junction railway station.

It is located near Karungalpalayam in the northern part of the city.

Locations of interest include VOC Park Stadium and VOC Park as well as the Mohamoodia Masjid, a small mosque built in 1980.
