= Interliner =

Former Dutch express bus service

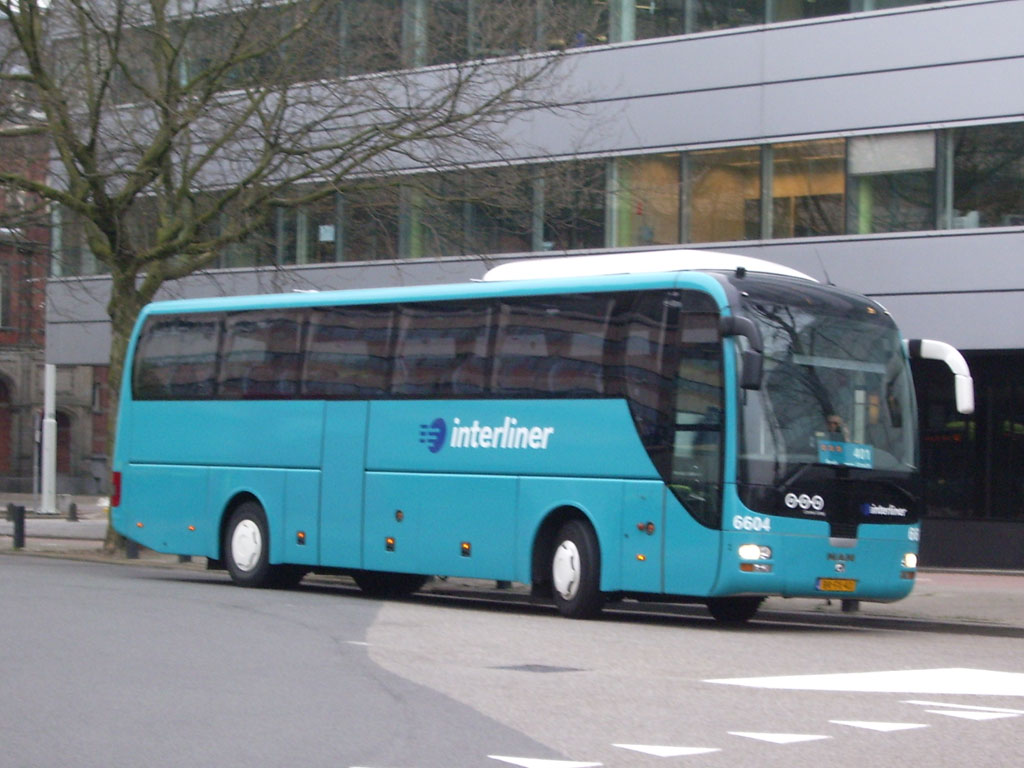
Green Interliner at Utrecht Centraal station

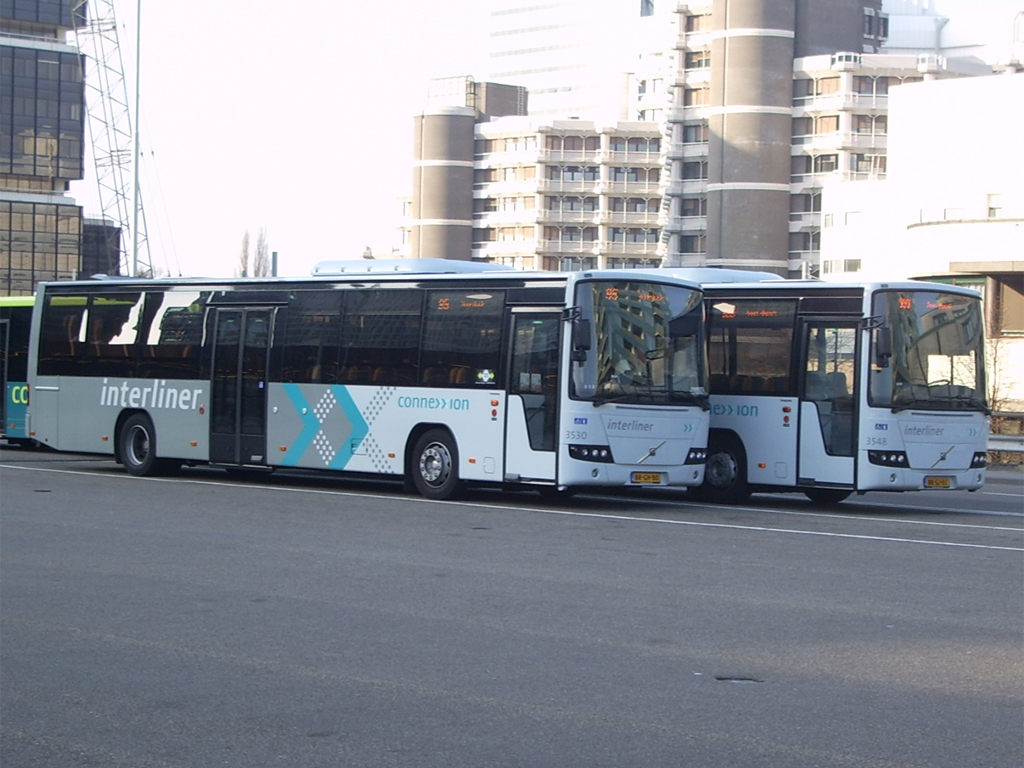
Grey Interliners at Den Haag Centraal station

Interliner is an express bus system in the Netherlands. In this country the backbone of medium and long distance public transport is the railroad system. Long distance buses are used complementarily. While most bus lines have many stops or only span small distances (e.g. within cities), Interliner buses travel longer distances with fewer stops, to cover itineraries not served by train, either because the destination is not on the railroad system, or because travel by train would require a considerable detour.

The Interliner was introduced in 1994 and many different Dutch public companies used this name for express buses.

As of 2009, uniformity has been abandoned with part of the system being renamed Q-Liner (Arriva) and a distinction between grey and green interliner. Only Connexxion still uses the name Interliner. Other variations of the name have been introduced like Hanzeliner (Connexxion) and Brabantliner (Veolia Transport).

For example they connect:

- North Holland to the northeast using the Afsluitdijk
- Rotterdam to three islands (Zeeland) in the southwest using a tunnel, two dams and a bridge
- Drachten (which is not connected by a railroad)
- Lelystad to the north through the Noordoostpolder to Groningen and to Zwolle
- Groningen to Emmen.
