= Sidi Boubekeur District =

Coordinates: 35.0289°N 0.0569°E

- District
- Interactive map of Sidi Boubekeur District
- Country: Algeria
- Province: Saïda Province
- Time zone: UTC+1 (CET)

Sidi Boubekeur District is a district of Saïda Province, Algeria.

The district is further divided into 4 municipalities:

- Sidi Boubekeur
- Ouled Khaled
- Sidi Amar
- Hounet
