= Ben Brahim =

Ben Brahim or bin Brahim is an Arabic patronymic literally meaning "son of Brahim (Ibrahim)". Notable people with this patronymic include:

- Ali Fethi Ben Mohamed Ben Brahim Riahi, or Ali Riahi
- Ahmed Ben Jaafar Ben Brahim Ibn Al Jazzar, or Ibn al-Jazzar
- Driss Ben-Brahim
- Mohamed Ben Brahim
- Mohammed Ben Brahim
- Mongi Ben Brahim
- Muhammad Syamsul Ariffin bin Brahim (born 30 May 1983), Singaporean gang member of Salakau
