= Brahim (given name) =

Brahim is a given name. It is the Lebanese and Maghrebian pronunciation of Ibrahim, the Arabic name of the prophet and patriarch Abraham. Notable people with the name include:

== Music ==
- Brahim Attaeb (born 1984), better known by his mononym Brahim, Belgian R&B singer and presenter of Moroccan descent
- Brahim Mahrez, better known by his mononym Brahim, French reggae and ragga artist of Algerian origin

== Sports ==
- Brahim Arafat Mezouar (born 1973), Algerian football player
- Brahim Asloum (born 1979), French boxer and Olympic Gold medallist
- Brahim Boulami (born 1972), Moroccan athlete who set two world records in the 3000 meters steeplechase
- Brahim Boutayeb (born 1967), former Moroccan athlete and Olympic winner
- Brahim Chettah (born 1980), Algerian long-distance runner
- Brahim Díaz (born 1999), Spanish and Moroccan footballer
- Brahim El Bahri (born 1986), Moroccan football midfielder
- Brahim Ferradj (born 1987), French and Algerian footballer
- Brahim Hemdani (born 1978), French and Algerian professional football player
- Brahim Jabbour (born 1970), retired Moroccan long-distance runner who specialized in the 5000 metres
- Brahim Kerrit (born 1940), former Tunisian football player
- Brahim Lahlafi (born 1968), retired long-distance runner who represented Morocco
- Brahim Taleb (born 1985), Moroccan long-distance runner who specializes in the 3000 metres steeplechase
- Brahim Thiam (born 1974), Malian football (soccer) defender
- Brahim Zaari (born 1989), Dutch footballer of Moroccan descent
- Brahim Zafour (born 1977), Algerian football player
- Brahim Zehhar (born 1935), Moroccan former footballer

== Politics ==
- Brahim Déby (1980–2007), the son of 6th Chadian President Idriss Déby and brother of current Chadian President Mahamat Déby
- Brahim Dahane (born 1965), Sahrawi human rights activist and President of the Sahrawi Association of Victims of Grave Human Rights Violations Committed by the Moroccan State
- Brahim Koulamallah, Chadian politician
- Brahim Mojtar (born 1953), Sahrawi POLISARIO diplomatic
- Brahim Yadel, citizen of France held in extrajudicial detention in the U.S. Guantanamo Bay detainment camps in Cuba
- Joseph Brahim Seid (1927–1980), Chadian writer and politician
- Brahim Ghali (from 2016) President of The Sáhara Occidental (for the Polisario Front Party-Sahrawi Republicans)

== Others ==
- Brahim Akhiat (c. 1941 – 2018), Moroccan author
- Brahim Takioullah (born 1982), Guinness World Records holder for the "World's largest feet"
- Brahim Zniber (1920–2016), Moroccan businessman

== See also ==
- Mostefa Ben Brahim District, district of Sidi Bel Abbès Province, Algeria
- My Brahim, town in Al Haouz Province, Marrakech-Tensift-Al Haouz, Morocco
- Ouled Brahim District, district of Saïda Province, Algeria
- Ouled Sidi Brahim, town and commune in Bordj Bou Arréridj Province, Algeria
- Prix Mohamed Brahim Bouallou, Moroccan literary prize awarded to very short stories
- Sidi Brahim (disambiguation)
