= Brahim =

Brahim is a shorter form of Ibrahim, Arabic for Abraham. It may refer to:

- Brahim (given name)
- Brahim (surname)
- Brahim (Pashtun tribe), a tribe in Afghanistan
- Brahim (film), a 1957 Moroccan film; see 7th Berlin International Film Festival § Films in competition

== See also ==
- Sidi Brahim (disambiguation)
- Abraham (disambiguation)
- Ibrahim (disambiguation)
