= Ahmad Ibrahim =

Ahmad Ibrahim, Ahmed Ibrahim or Ahmed Brahim may refer to:

- Ahmed Brahim (Tunisian politician) (1946–2016), Tunisian politician
- Ahmed Brahim (al-Qaeda) (born 1945), Algerian terrorist
- Ahmed Ibrahim (Cupid Cabbie), Egyptian-American taxicab driver
- Ahmad Ibrahim (Singaporean politician) (1927–1962), Singaporean politician
- Ahmad Ibrahim (basketball) (born 1992), Lebanese basketball player
- Ahmed Ibrahim (field hockey) (born 1978), Egyptian Olympic hockey player
- Ahmed Ibrahim (rower) (born 1938), Egyptian Olympic rower
- Ahmed Ibrahim (wrestler) (born 1971), Egyptian Olympic wrestler
- Ahmad Mohamed Ibrahim (1916–1999), Singaporean lawyer, law professor and Attorney-General of Singapore
- Ibrahim Ahmad (1914–2000), Kurdish writer and politician
- Ahmed Ibrahim (Ghanaian politician) (born 1974), Ghanaian politician
- Ahmed Halim Ibrahim (1910–?), Egyptian football midfielder
- Ahmed M. Ibrahim, Egyptian football player
- Ahmed Osman Ibrahim, Somali politician

Furthermore, Ahmed Ibrahim are the first names of:

- Ahmed Ibrahim al-Haznawi, September 11 hijacker, 1980–2001
- Ahmed Ibrahim Al-Mughassil (born 1967), Saudi Hizbollah terrorist
- Ahmed Ibrahim Artan, Somali diplomat
- Ahmed Ibrahim Baday, Moroccan long-distance runner, born 1974
- Ahmad Ibrahim Khalaf, Iraqi association footballer, born 1992
- Ahmed Ibrahim Lawan, Nigerian politician
- Ahmed Ibrahim Warsama (born 1966), Qatari long-distance runner
