= Aïn El Hadjar District =

Coordinates: 34.7586°N 0.1444°E

- District
- Interactive map of Aïn El Hadjar District
- Country: Algeria
- Province: Saïda Province
- Time zone: UTC+1 (CET)

Aïn El Hadjar District is a district of Saïda Province, Algeria. Its capital city is Aïn El Hadjar.

The district is further divided into 3 municipalities:

- Aïn El Hadjar
- Moulay Larbi
- Sidi Ahmed
