= Youb District =

Coordinates: 34.9167°N 0.2167°W

- District
- Interactive map of Youb District
- Country: Algeria
- Province: Saïda Province
- Time zone: UTC+1 (CET)

Youb District is a district of Saïda Province, Algeria.

The district is further divided into 2 municipalities:

- Youb
- Doui Thabet
