= Aimé Olivier de Sanderval =

French adventurer

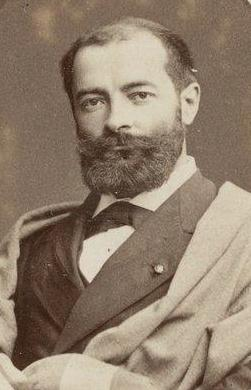
Olivier in 1878

Aimé Olivier de Sanderval (10 July 1840, Lyon, France – 22 March 1919), comte de Sanderval, was a French adventurer, explorer of West Africa, entrepreneur and author.

== Early life ==
He was born in Lyon, the second of three brothers; Marius was born in 1839 and René in 1843.

He attended the lycée Saint-Louis in Paris. He received a Bachelor of Science degree in 1860. In 1864, he graduated from the Parisian Central School of Arts and Manufactures (of which his uncle Théodore Olivier was a co-founder).

== Velocipedes ==
In August 1865, René and Aimé Olivier, along with Georges de La Bouglise, traveled by velocipede (an early form of the bicycle) across France from Paris to Tullins to visit the Olivers' uncle, Michel Perret; they then continued on to Avignon. While still students at the Central School, the Olivier brothers became acquainted with Pierre Michaux. They became early velocipede manufacturers; In partnership with Michaux, they formed the Michaux et Cie company in May 1868. However, they eventually parted ways with Michaux, and Michaux et Cie was dissolved. The Compagnie Parisienne des Vélocipèdes was established, but the French public lost interest in the velocipede, and the second company came to an end in 1874, leaving Aimé Olivier open to another venture.

== In Africa ==
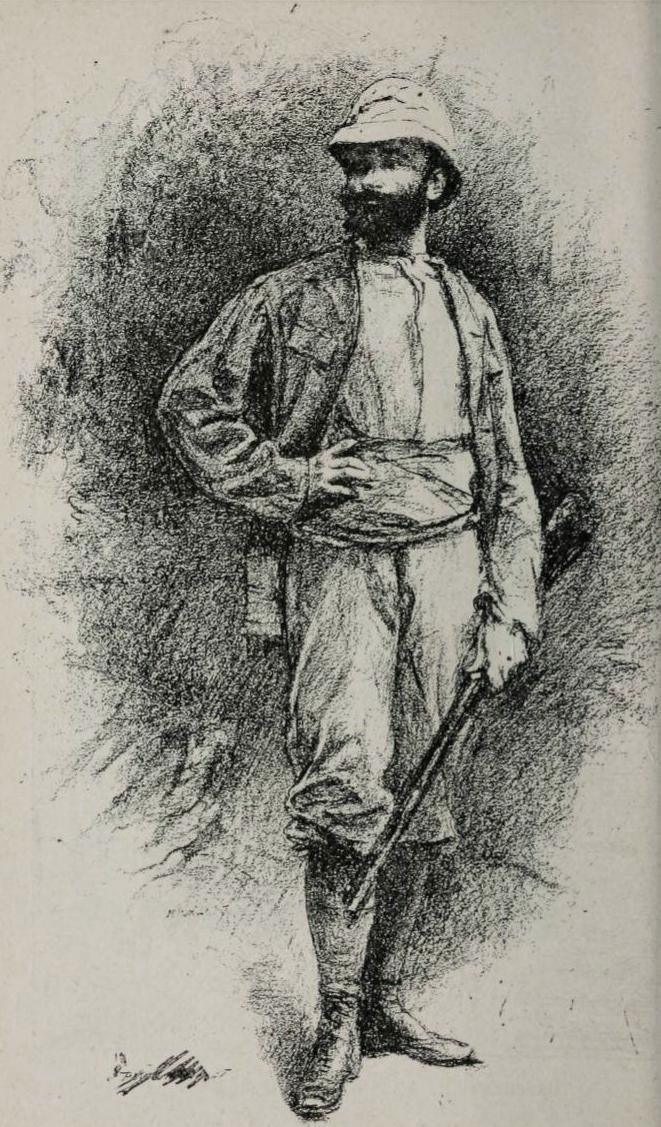
Olivier in 1882

A longtime admirer of French explorer René Caillié, Olivier himself explored much of "Lower and Middle Guinea". He visited Labé in 1875 and traveled to Timbo by way of Boké twice, in 1880 and 1888.

He lived many years in the Labé and Timbo regions, and persuaded the almamy, the leader of the imamate of Futa Jallon, to grant him sizable territorial concessions. (He had coins struck while trying to establish his own realm in the Fouta Djallon region in what is now Guinea.) The concessions were taken away from him, but they played a part in the creation of a French protectorate over the Fouta Djallon area.

Later, he settled down in Conakry. The Sandervalia district of the city is named after him.

At some point, King Luís I of Portugal bestowed on him the title comte de Sanderval.

== Novel ==
The King of Kahel (French: Le Roi de Kahel) is a 2008 French-language novel by Guinean author Tierno Monénembo which is loosely based on Olivier's life. It won the 2008 prix Renaudot.

== Works ==
- De l'Atlantique au Niger par le Foutah-Djallon, carnet de voyage d'Aimé Olivier de Sanderval, 1882.
- Soudan français Kahel; carnet de voyage, d'Aimé Olivier de Sanderval, 1893.
- Conquête du Foutah-Djallon, d'Aimé Olivier de Sanderval, 1899.
- Les Rives du Konkouré, de l'Atlantique au Fouta-Djalon, Paris, Challamel, 1900.
- De l'absolu (extraits). La mort n'est pas la mort., Digne, Constans et Davin, 1914.
- Mémoires d'Aimé Olivier, comte de Sanderval, published by Georges Olivier de Sanderval, with illustrations by Gaullieur-L'Hardy, Imprimeries bretonnes, 1961.
