= El Hassasna District =

Coordinates: 34.8242°N 0.3231°E

- District
- Interactive map of El Hassasna District
- Country: Algeria
- Province: Saïda Province
- Time zone: UTC+1 (CET)

El Hassasna District is a district of Saïda Province, Algeria.

The district is further divided into 3 municipalities:

- El Hassasna
- Aïn Sekhouna
- Maamora
