= Gilbert Daniel Nessim =

Israeli chemistry professor (born 1966)

- גילברט דניאל נסים
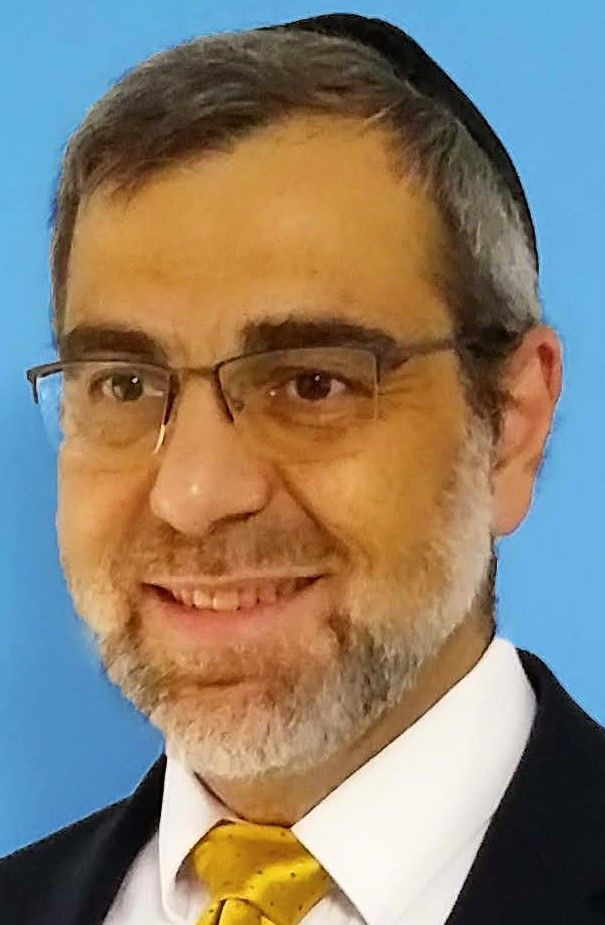
- Born: January 31, 1966 (age 60); Italy
- Citizenship: Israeli
- Education: Massachusetts Institute of Technology (MIT)
- Known for: 1D and 2D nanomaterials, Chemical Vapor Deposition, Carbon nanotubes
- Scientific career
- Fields: Chemistry, nanomaterials
- Workplaces: Bar-Ilan University
- Doctoral advisor: Carl V. Thompson

Gilbert Daniel Nessim (Hebrew: גילברט דניאל נסים; born 31 January 1966) is a chemistry professor at Bar-Ilan University specializing in the synthesis of 1D and 2D nanomaterials for electronic, mechanic, and energy applications.

== Biography ==
Gilbert Daniel Nessim was born in Milan, in 1966. He earned two Master of Sciences in Electrical Engineering (Master of Engineering), the first in 1989 from the Polytechnic University of Milan (Politecnico di Milano), Italy and the second in 1991 from École Centrale Paris, France within the Erasmus / T.I.M.E. program (Top International Managers in Engineering). He completed D.E.A. (Diplôme d’études Approfondies) in optoelectronics in 1991 from the Pierre and Marie Curie University (Paris VI), France with distinction. After graduation, he worked for three years at Otis Elevators in their European Research and Development center in France where he developed and patented an innovative electronic infrared detector for elevator doors. Later in 1994, he earned an MBA from INSEAD, France with a Giovanni Agnelli scholarship. Following his MBA, Nessim joined an American consulting firm, PRTM (now acquired by PwC, PricewaterhouseCoopers), as a consultant, assisting in product development and operations strategy to various hi-tech companies in Europe and USA.

In 2004, he started his PhD at Massachusetts Institute of Technology (MIT) in Material Science and Engineering. Under the supervision of Professor Carl V. Thompson, he focused his research on the synthesis of carbon nanotubes. He then spent a year as a postdoc in a collaborative project between Professor Carl V. Thompson (MIT) and Professor Doron Aurbach (Bar-Ilan University, Israel). In 2010, he joined the staff of the Chemistry Department of Bar-Ilan University where he became an associate professor leading his lab on the synthesis of 1D and 2D nanostructures.

== Scientific interests and publications ==
Nessim's research involves synthesizing and understanding complex growth mechanisms of 1D and 2D nanostructures. Most research is carried using chemical vapor deposition (CVD) to tune properties and integration of the nanomaterials into various innovative energy storage and electronic devices. These nanostructures include carbon nanotubes (CNTs), carbon fiber-mats (CNFs), graphene, graphene oxide (GO) reduced GO (rGO), and non-carbon bulk layered materials like metal -sulfides, -phosphides and -selenides. In the synthesis of carbon nanotubes, (CNTs), he has pioneered multiple techniques such as gas preheating, the role of the underlayer, and the use of thin film reservoirs and overlayers to modulate specific material characteristic parameters such as diameter, length and the number of walls. In the synthesis of metal chalcogenides, he innovated in the synthesis of bulk 2D layered materials.

Among his previous awards were a 2-year Intel Corporation Fellowship during his PhD. Currently, he is the President of The Israel Vacuum Society (IVS), which is aimed at promoting and stimulating professional interconnections and communication among Israeli scientists specializing in the areas of surface science, thin films and vacuum science.
