= Jean-Loïc Galle =

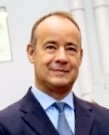
- Jean-Loïc Galle in 2015
- Born: 26 September 1959 (age 66); Fougères, France
- Education: École Centrale Paris; INSEAD
- Occupation: Chief operating officer
- Employer: Thales

Jean-Loïc Galle (born 26 September 1959) is General Director of Opérations and Performance of Thales.

== Education ==
Jean-Loïc Galle holds a master's degree in engineering from École Centrale Paris (class of 1982) and an MBA from INSEAD (class of 1991). He also completed executive training at the Centre des Hautes Etudes de l'Armement (CHEAr), a French institute for defense studies.

== Career ==
- 2003 - 2007 : CEO of ThalesRaytheonSystems
- 2010 - 2012 : Senior VP of Thales Air Operations Division
- 2012 - : President and CEO of Thales Alenia Space
- 2020 - Directeur général Opérations and Performance of Thales.

== Distinctions ==
- Knight of the French Legion of Honour (2013)
