= Ouled Brahim District =

Coordinates: 35.0000°N 0.5000°E

- District
- Interactive map of Ouled Brahim District
- Country: Algeria
- Province: Saïda Province
- Time zone: UTC+1 (CET)

Ouled Brahim District is a district of Saïda Province, Algeria.

The district is further divided into 3 municipalities:

- Ouled Brahim
- Tircine
- Aïn Soltane
