= Aïn Sekhouna =

- Commune and town

- Location within Algeria
- Coordinates: 34°30′20″N 0°50′59″E
- Country: Algeria
- Province: Saïda Province
- District: El Hassasna District
- Time zone: UTC+1 (CET)

Aïn Sekhouna is a town and commune in Saïda Province in northwestern Algeria.
