= Brahim (surname) =

Brahim is a surname, the word being a variant of Ibrahim. Notable people with the surname include:

- Ahmat Brahim (born 1982), Chadian footballer
- Ahmed Brahim (born 1945), convicted al-Qaeda member from Algeria
- Ahmed Brahim (1946–2016), Tunisian politician
- Amel Brahim-Djelloul (born 1975), Algerian soprano opera singer and concert recitalist
- Aziza Brahim (born 1976), Sahrawi singer and actress
- Juliana Santillán y Juárez-Brahim (born 1979), Argentine national diputy
- Mariam Brahim (born 1956), Chadian physician
- Suliane Brahim (born 1978), French actress
- Yassine Brahim (born 1966), Tunisian engineer, manager and politician
