= Théodore Olivier =

French mathematician

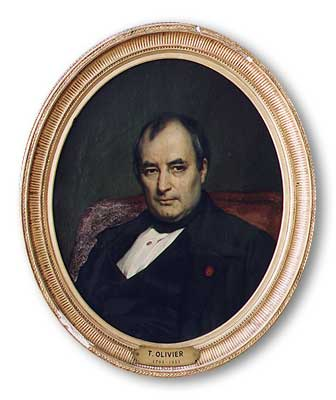
- Born: 14 January 1793; Lyon, France
- Died: 5 August 1853 (aged 60); Lyon, France
- Resting place: Montparnasse Cemetery; 48°50′17″N 2°19′37″E
- Education: École Polytechnique
- Scientific career
- Fields: Mathematics
- Workplaces: Ecole centrale des arts et manufactures
- Thesis: Recherches géométriques sur les centres de courbure des épicycloïdes planes et sphériques, et les développantes sphériques (1834)

Théodore Olivier (1793–1853) was a French mathematician.

== Life and work ==
Olivier studied in the Licée Imperial of Lyon, where he obtained in 1811 a degree in mathematics with high honours. After this, he went to the École Polytechnique. Olivier looked like Napoleon, but nobody could prove that Olivier was an illegitimate son of the Emperor.

In 1815, he was an adjunct professor in the Artillery School at Metz and, in 1819, he became a full professor. In 1821, at the request of the King of Sweden, Charles XIV John (Jean-Baptiste Bernadotte), he went to Sweden to organize the military school of Marieberg.

Returning to France, Oliver criticized the pedagogical system in the École Polytechnique and in 1829, jointly with Alphonse Lavallée, Jean-Baptiste Dumas and Jean Claude Eugène Péclet, founded the École Centrale des Arts et Manufactures, where he was professor of geometry and mechanics for the rest of his life. He also was, between 1830 and 1844, a professor at the École Polytechnique and, from 1838, a professor at the École Nationale Supérieure des Arts et Métiers.

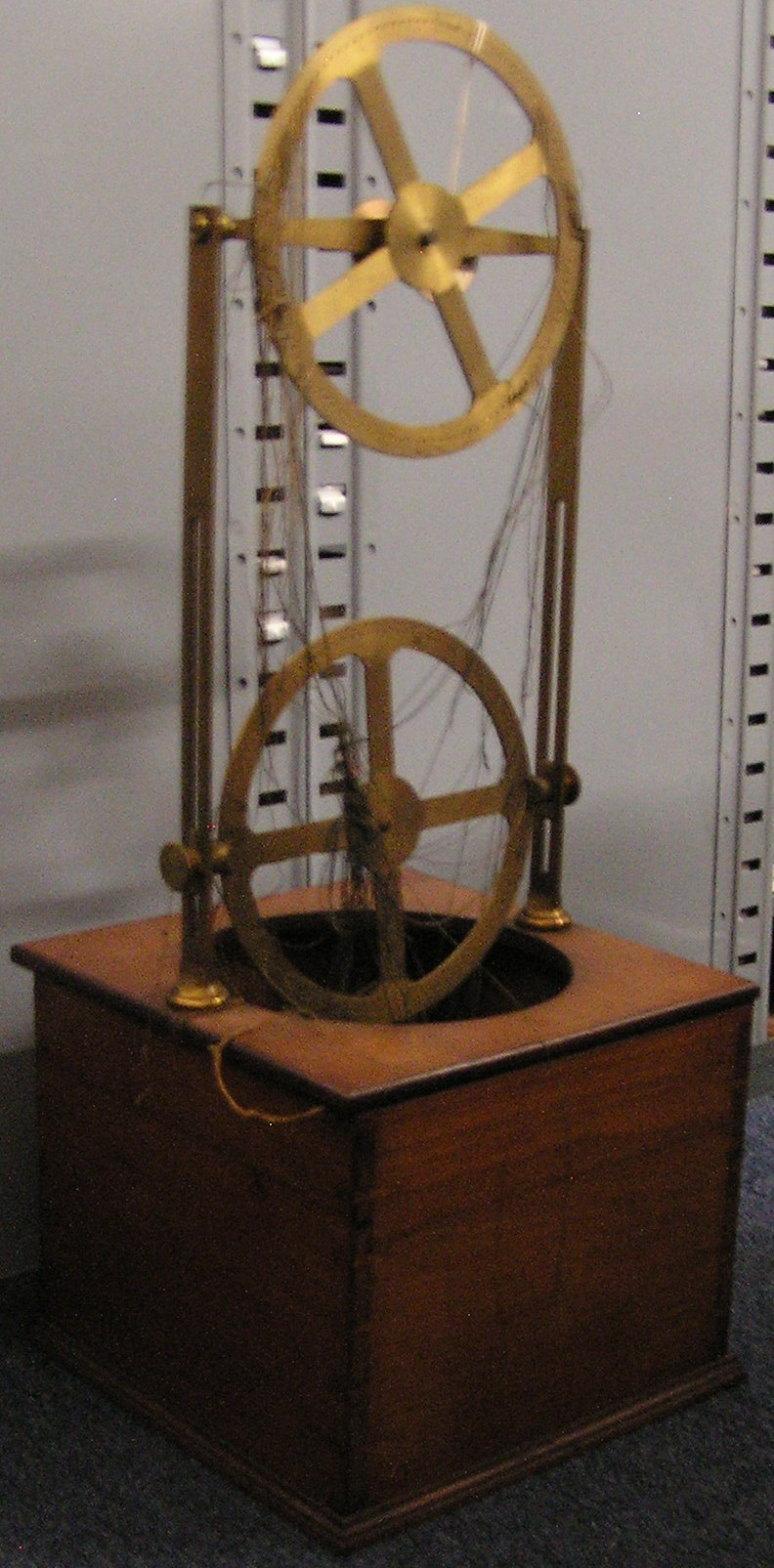
Example of an Olivier's geometrical model conserved in the Canada Science and Technology Museum

Olivier is mainly known for the construction of three-dimensional models of geometry for pedagogical purposes. Most of them were sold to North American institutions such as Union College, Columbia University and West Point, where they are preserved.

Olivier also studied the theory of gears, writing an extensive treatise on the subject and constructing models, preserved in the Musée des Arts et Offices in Paris.

Olivier had no children, but he was the uncle of the French explorer Aimé Olivier de Sanderval.

== Bibliography ==
- Hervé, J.M. (2007). "Théodore Olivier (1793–1853)". In Marco Ceccarelli (ed.). Distinguished Figures in Mechanism and Machine Science. Springer. pp. 294–319. ISBN 978-1-4020-6365-7.
- Jacomy, Bruno (1995). "Du cabinet au Conservatoire. Les instruments scientifiques du Conservatoire des Arts et Métiers à Paris". Journal of the History of Collections (in French). 7 (2): 227–233. doi:10.1093/jhc/7.2.227. ISSN 0954-6650.
- Nesme, Auguste (1858). Notice sur Théodore Olivier (in French). Aimé Vingtrinier.
