= Jacques Maisonrouge =

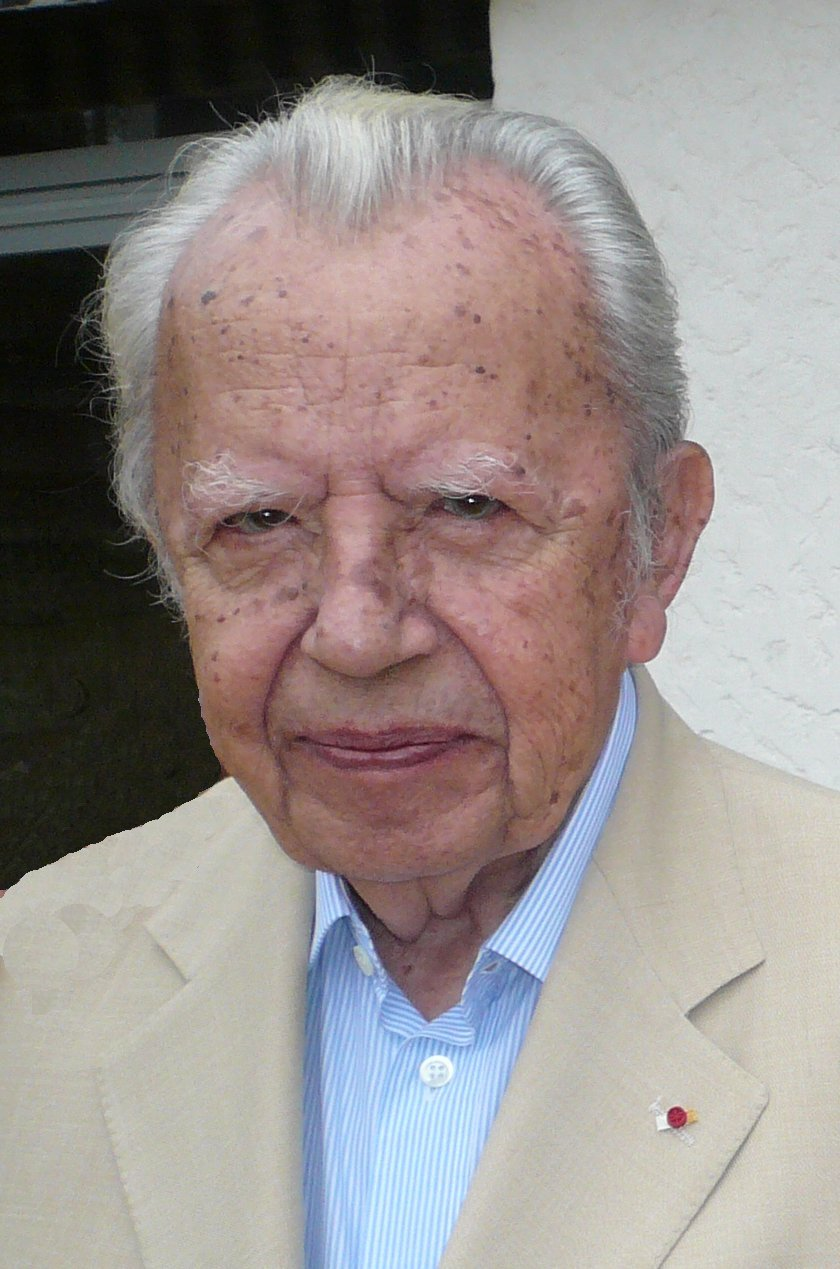
Jacques Maisonrouge in 2010

Jacques Gaston Maisonrouge (20 September 1924 – 25 January 2012) was a French businessman who became chairman of IBM World Trade Corporation. He was born in 1924 at Cachan to Paul and Suzanne (née Cazas) Maisonrouge. He graduated from the Ecole Centrale des Arts et Manufactures (École Centrale Paris). He married Francoise Féron in 1948; they had five children.

His career with IBM, which spanned 36 years from 1948 to 1984, included four postings to the USA. Maisonrouge was appointed Vice President IBM World Trade Corporation in 1962; President in 1967; CEO in 1973, and Chairman in 1976. He was elected a Board Member of IBM Corporation in 1983, before retiring in 1984; he was also elected to the boards of Air Liquide, Moët-Hennesy and Philip Morris.

Following retirement, he served the French public sector as Director General of Industry, a ministerial position, in 1986 by the French government and, subsequently, Chairman of Centre Français du Commerce Extérieur (CFCE, French International Trade Development Agency).

He was active in improving French-American relations, particularly through his chairmanship from 1989 of the Senate Committee for the Image of France abroad, and in promoting world peace through world trade. In 1989 he published his book Inside IBM: A European's Story or Inside IBM: A personal story. His voluntary work included the Chairmanship of his alma mater, the Ecole Centrale, the Chairmanship of the Board of Governors of the American Hospital of Paris and the Chairmanship of the Association France-United States in Paris. Notably, he addressed the first meeting of the European Management Forum in 1971 on data and privacy; this was the body that later renamed itself to the World Economic Forum.

During his career, he received numerous honours: he was elevated to the rank of Grand Officier of the Légion d'Honneur 1999; Commander of the French Orders of Merit, of Academic Palms, of Arts and Letters; Austrian Grand Cross of Merit; Commander of the Order of Merit of the Italian Republic; Officer of the Order of the Belgian Crown; Commander of the Swedish Order of the Polar Star; Commander of the Order of Saint Sylvester of the Vatican. He was a Knight of the Order of Malta and Grand Officer of Merit of the Order; he was an honorary member of the Society of the Cincinnati. He received honorary doctorates from Assumption and Westbury Universities, and from the Polytechnics of Mons in Belgium and Madrid in Spain.

After his death, the 2015 class of his school, the Ecole Centrale Paris, was named after him.
