= Aïn Soltane, Saïda =

Aïn Soltane
- Commune and town

- Location within Algeria
- Coordinates: 34°58′4″N 0°18′8″E
- Country: Algeria
- Province: Saïda Province
- District: Ouled Brahim District

Population (2008)
  - Total: 6,920
- Time zone: UTC+1 (CET)

Aïn Soltane is a town and commune in Saïda Province, Algeria.
