= Alphonse Lavallée =

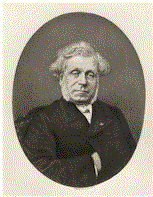
Alphonse Lavallée

Alphonse Lavallée (1791–1873) is the founder of the École Centrale Paris, a French Grande École.

He was born in Savigné-l'Évêque (Sarthe region, France). After studying law in Paris, Lavallée became the director of various companies such as the Compagnie du chemin de fer de Paris à Orléans. He also became a businessman in the region of Nantes, working for ten years with his brother-in-law who was a shipowner of the merchant vessel Bourgault Ducoudray. After moving to Paris in 1827 where he moved with his wife and his one-year-old daughter, Amazilli, Lavallée became a shareholder of the Le Globe, a liberal opposition newspaper with Saint-Simonian roots.

Two years later, Lavallée decided to create a new school of engineering for the emerging industrial sector in France, at a time when all the leading institutions were essentially training engineers for public administration. He founded in 1829 the prominent École centrale des arts et manufactures in Paris, also known as the École Centrale Paris, with the help of three scientists: the chemist Jean-Baptiste Dumas, the physicist Jean Claude Eugène Péclet and the mathematician Théodore Olivier. Lavallée provided most of the funds with his private capital to establish the school and became its first president (directeur). The first location of the school was the Hôtel de Juigné building in the Marais district, which has now become the Musée Picasso.

His son, Pierre Alphonse Martin Lavallée (1836–1884), created an arboretum in the park of the Château de Segrez in Saint-Sulpice-de-Favières (Essonne), which was one of the biggest in Europe at the time.

He died in Paris on 15 May 1873 at the age of 75, and is buried in the Père Lachaise Cemetery.
