= The King of Kahel =

2008 novel by Tierno Monénembo

- First French edition
- Author: Tierno Monénembo
- Original title: Le Roi de Kahel
- Translator: Nicholas Elliott
- Language: French
- Publisher: Éditions du Seuil
- Publication date: 2008
- Publication place: Guinea
- English publication date: 2010
- Pages: 304
- ISBN: 0-9825550-7-5

The King of Kahel (French: Le Roi de Kahel) is a 2008 French-language novel by Guinean author Tierno Monénembo. It won the 2008 prix Renaudot. It was translated in 2010 to English by Nicholas Elliott and published by AmazonCrossing, Amazon.com's translated fiction publishing imprint. The King of Kahel was AmazonCrossing's premier book.

The novel is loosely based on the true story of French colonialist Aimé Olivier de Sanderval who in the late 19th century attempted to establish himself as King in the highland region of Fouta Djallon, in Guinea.

== Editions ==
- The King of Kahel, AmazonCrossing, 2010, ISBN 0-9825550-7-5, paperback, first English edition.
