= Sidi Brahim Riahi Mausoleum =

Zawiya in Tunis, Tunisia

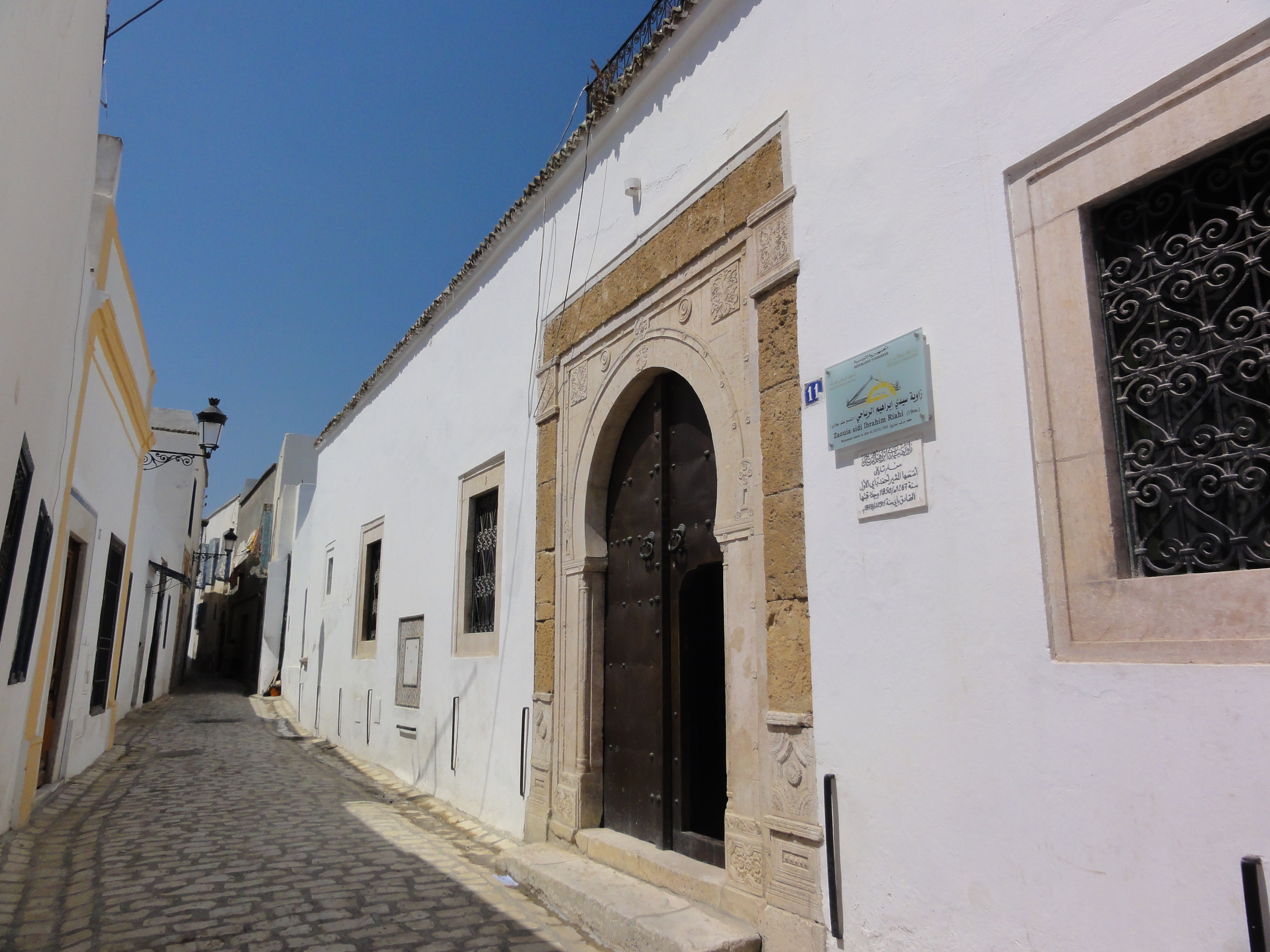
Entrance of the zaouia of Sidi Brahim Riahi

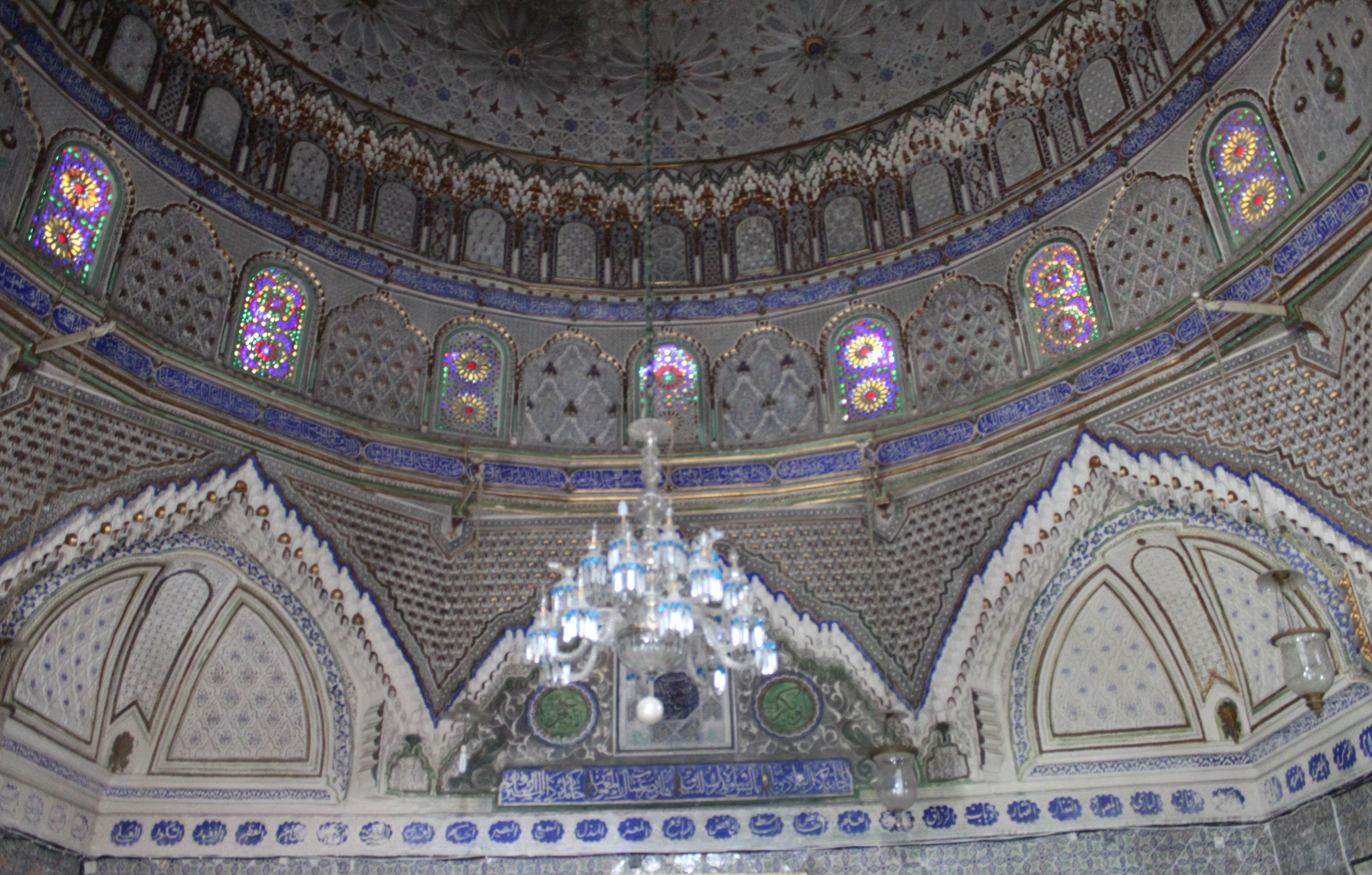
Dome of the zaouia

Sidi Brahim Riahi Mausoleum (arabic: زاوية سيدي براهيم الرياحي) is one of the most important mausoleums of the medina of Tunis. Founded by Sidi Brahim Riahi.

== Localisation ==
The mausoleum is located in the Sidi Brahim Riahi Street, near Dar Lasram and El Hafsia district.

== History ==
Sidi Brahim Riahi, a famous saint in Tunis, is buried with some of his sons, sheikhs and theologians in this mausoleum. The monument was built following the order of Ahmed I Bey to shelter the Sufi brotherhood of which Sidi Brahim Riahi had become the master in Tunis. Later, Sadok Bey improved the decoration 1878 by bringing craftsmen from Morocco, and made it one of the most beautiful architectural jewels of the medina.

== Architecture ==
Access to the building is via a chicane entrance opening onto a courtyard surrounded by various rooms reserved for visitors and an oratory covered by a large dome richly decorated with stucco. This oratory, which also serves as a mosque, overlooks a room where the tombs of Sidi Brahim and his sons are. The zaouïa still houses the meetings of his tariqa.
