= Tierno Monénembo =

Guinean writer (born 1947)

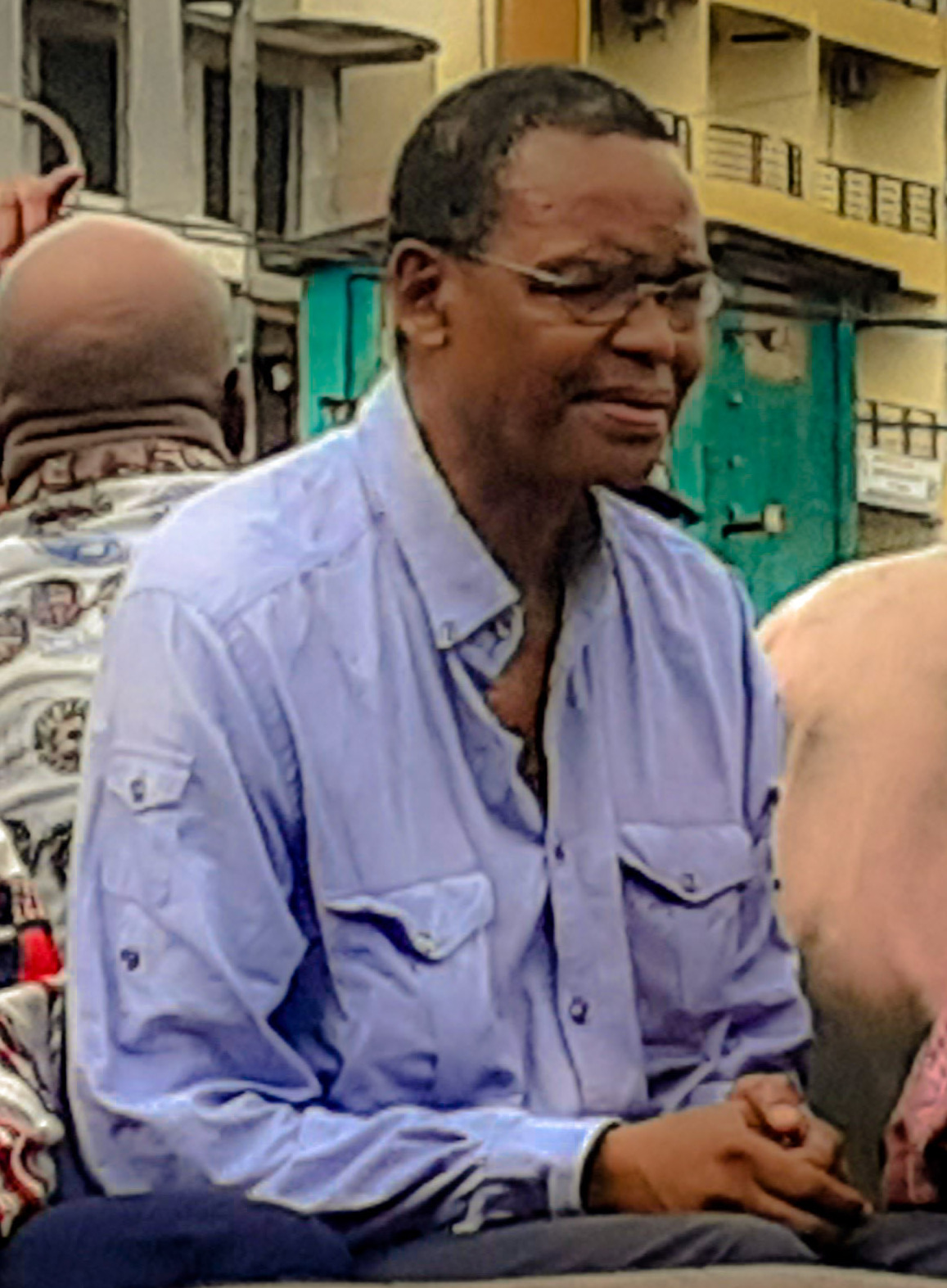
- Born: 1947 (age 78–79); Porédaka, Guinea
- Occupations: Novelist and biochemist

Thierno Saïdou Diallo, usually known as Tierno Monénembo (born 1947 in Porédaka), is a Francophone Guinean novelist and biochemist. Born in Guinea, he later lived in Senegal, Algeria, Morocco, and finally France since 1973. He has written eight books in all and was awarded the 2008 prix Renaudot for The King of Kahel (le Roi de Kahel).

== Education ==
In 1969, this son of a government official left Guinea, fleeing the Ahmed Sékou Touré dictatorship on foot to neighbouring Senegal. He then went to the Ivory Coast to pursue his studies. He went to France in 1973, again for his studies, and he obtained a doctorate in biochemistry from the University of Lyon. Afterwards, he taught in Morocco and Algeria. Since 2007, he has been a visiting professor at Middlebury College in Vermont, USA.

== Writing career ==
Tierno Monénembo published his first novel in 1979. His novels often deal with the powerlessness of intellectuals in Africa, and the difficulties of the lives of Africans in exile in France. He is particularly interested in the history and connections of blacks with the forced immigrant diaspora in Brazil (Pelourihno). He recently devoted a novel to the Fula people and a fictionalized biography of Aimé Olivier de Sanderval, a French adventurer and explorer, originally from Lyon and Marseille (Pastré country), who admired their civilization and became a Fulani king. He uses the opportunity to revisit colonial history in order to bring this controversial period into the fictional imagination. He is currently working on the life of a Guinean Fula, a hero of the Resistance in France, executed by the Germans, as well as on the links connecting the black diaspora of the Americas with Africa.

Tierno Monénembo was a writer in residence in Cuba when he learned that he was the 2008 winner of the Renaudot Prize. His award, however, put a spotlight on the growing place that French writers of African origin occupy in Francophone literature. It also emphasized, even if Tierno Monénembo lives in Normandy as if in the footprints of the Senegalese poet-president Leopold Sedar Senghor, that part of contemporary French literature is found in the South.

For the English-speaking world, his significance was more for being one of the African authors invited to Rwanda after the 1994 Tutsi-Hutu massacre to "write genocide into memory". From this came the novel The Oldest Orphan; the 2004 translation by the University of Nebraska–Lincoln may be his most successful book in the English language. In November 2010 the English translation of Le Roi de Kahel (The King of Kahel) was published by AmazonCrossing, Amazon.com's translated fiction publishing arm; it was the new publishing company's first translated and published book.

== Politics ==
He was strongly critical of the military coup d'état of 23 December 2008, in Guinea having brought to power the junta led by Captain Moussa Dadis Camara, just after the death of President Lansana Conté, who led the country with an iron fist since 1984. Remaining relatively quiet in 2009, on both a political and literary level, until the massacre of more than 150 civilians by the army on September 28 in Conakry, he then wrote a column published in Le Monde entitled "Guinea, Fifty Years of Independence and Hell" to condemn these killings and call the international community to action.

Monénembo is also critical of the military regime of Mamady Doumbouya and supported a boycott of the 2025 Guinean constitutional referendum, calling it a way for Doumbouya of "legitimising his putsch and holding onto power for as long as possible".

== Works ==
- 1979 : Les Crapauds-brousse, Éditions du Seuil
- 1986 : Les Écailles du ciel, Seuil
- 1991 : Un rêve utile, Seuil
- 1993 : Un attiéké pour Elgass, Seuil
- 1995 : Pelourinho, Seuil
- 1997 : Cinéma : roman, Seuil
- 2000 : L'Aîné des orphelins, Seuil — Prix Tropiques
- 2004 : Peuls, Seuil
- 2006 : La Tribu des gonzesses : théâtre, éditions Cauris
- 2008 : Le Roi de Kahel, Seuil — Prix Renaudot
- 2012 : Le Terroriste noir, Seuil — Prix Ahmadou-Kourouma, Grand prix Palatine
- 2015 : Les coqs cubains chantent à minuit, Seuil
- 2016 : Bled, Seuil

== Awards ==
- 1986: Grand prix littéraire d'Afrique noire ex-aequo, pour Les Écailles du ciel
- 2008: Prix Renaudot for Le Roi de Kahel
- 2012: Prix Erckmann-Chatrian and Grand prix du roman métis for Le Terroriste noir
- 2013: Grand prix Palatine and prix Ahmadou-Kourouma and Le Terroriste noir
- 2017: Grand Prix de la Francophonie
