= Aïn El Hadjar, Saïda =

Aïn El Hadjar
- Commune and town

- Location within Algeria
- Coordinates: 34°45′31″N 0°8′40″E
- Country: Algeria
- Province: Saïda Province
- District: Aïn El Hadjar District
- Time zone: UTC+1 (CET)

Aïn El Hadjar (Berber languages: ⵄⵉⵏ ⵍⴰⵃⵊⴰⵔ) is a town and commune in Saïda Province in northwestern Algeria. It is the district capital of Aïn El Hadjar District.
