= Saïda Province =

Province of Algeria

Saïda Province ولاية سعيدة
- Province
- Map of Algeria highlighting Saïda
- Coordinates: 34°50′N 0°09′E
- Country: Algeria
- Capital: Saïda

Area
  - Total: 6,764 km^{2} (2,612 sq mi)

Population (2008)
  - Total: 328,685
  - Density: 48.59/km^{2} (125.9/sq mi)
- Time zone: UTC+01 (CET)
- Area Code: +213 (0) 48
- ISO 3166 code: DZ-20
- Districts: 6
- Municipalities: 16

Saïda (Arabic: ولاية سعيدة) is a province (wilaya) of Algeria, named after its capital.

== History ==
The province was created from parts of Oran department, Saïda province and Saoura province in 1974.

In 1984 El Bayadh Province and Naama Province were carved out of its territory.

== Geography ==
Saïda is located in the western high plateaus of Algeria. Historically, it has been considered a gateway between the plateaus and deserts of the south and the more populated north of the country. The province has abundant water.

== Administrative divisions ==
The province is divided into 6 districts (daïras), which are further divided into 16 communes or municipalities.

=== Districts ===
1. Aïn El Hadjar
2. El Hassasna
3. Ouled Brahim
4. Saïda
5. Sidi Boubekeur
6. Youb

=== Communes ===
1. Aïn El Hadjar
2. Aïn Sekhouna
3. Aïn Soltane
4. Doui Thabet
5. El Hassasna
6. Hounet
7. Maamora
8. Moulay Larbi
9. Ouled Brahim
10. Ouled Khaled
11. Saïda
12. Sidi Ahmed
13. Sidi Amar
14. Sidi Boubekeur
15. Tircine
16. Youb
