= Driss Ben-Brahim =

Moroccan businessman

Driss Ben-Brahim (born 1964) is a Moroccan-Austrian trader and investor based in London, England.

== Early life ==
Ben-Brahim is an engineer and mathematician by education. He graduated from École Centrale Paris (1987), studied Artificial Intelligence at the Max Planck Institut Munich, and received an MBA from INSEAD Fontainebleau (1990).

== Career ==
Early in his career, Ben-Brahim served as a Treasury Officer at the European Bank for Reconstruction and Development (EBRD) in London.

In 1994 Ben-Brahim joined Goldman Sachs. During his tenure he ran several businesses including global macro proprietary trading and emerging market trading and principal investments. He became a partner in 2004. News reports indicate he was one of Goldman's highest paid traders.

Ben-Brahim is a former employee of GLG Partners, where he developed and managed the Atlas Macro fund platform.

== Personal life ==
Ben-Brahim has a personal interest and is an active investor in technology and education. He is a partner of Zakoura Education and serves on the board of EMpower, charitable organizations focused on improving the lives and education of young people in developing countries.

Ben-Brahim is married to Heli Amin. They have three children.
