= École Centrale Paris =

French university-level institution (grande école) of engineering

Coordinates: 48°45′56.8″N 2°17′18.3″E

- Motto: Leader, Entrepreneur, Innovateur
- Type: Public, Grand établissement
- Active: 1829–2015
- Affiliations: University of Paris-Saclay, Centrale Graduate School, TIME, CESAER, UniverSud Paris
- President: Hervé Biausser
- Postgraduates: 2,505 (1,789 engineer candidates)
- Doctoral students: 223
- Location: Châtenay-Malabry, France
- Website: www.ecp.fr

École Centrale Paris (French pronunciation: [ekɔl sɑ̃tʁal paʁi], ECP; also known as École Centrale or Centrale) was a French grande école in engineering and science. It was also known by its official name École Centrale des Arts et Manufactures. In 2015, École Centrale Paris merged with Supélec to form CentraleSupélec, a constituent college of the University of Paris-Saclay.

Founded in 1829, it was among the most prestigious and selective grandes écoles. Rooted in rich entrepreneurial tradition since the industrial revolution era, it served as the cradle for top-level engineers and executives who continue to constitute a major part of the industry leadership in France. Since the 19th century, its model of education for training generalist engineers inspired the establishment of several engineering institutes around the world, such as the École Polytechnique Fédérale de Lausanne in Switzerland, Faculté polytechnique de Mons in Belgium, as well as other member schools of the Ecole Centrales Group alliance in France, Morocco, China, and India.

== History ==
"Between 1832 and 1870, the Central School of Arts and Manufactures produced 3,000 engineers, and served as a model for most of the industrialized countries."

— Mathias, Peter; Postan, Michael (1978). The Cambridge Economic History of Europe. Cambridge university press. p. 313. ISBN 9780521215909.

École Centrale des Arts et Manufactures was founded in 1829 as a private institute by Alphonse Lavallée, a lawyer and a prominent businessman from Nantes, who put forward most of his personal capital into founding the school, together with three top scientists who became its founding associates: Eugène Peclet, Jean-Baptiste Dumas, and Théodore Olivier. Notably, Lavallée was a shareholder of Le Globe, which became in 1831 the official organ of the Saint-Simonian movement.

The founding vision of École Centrale was to train multidisciplinary engineers who will become the first "doctors of factories and mills" of the then-emerging industrial sector in France, at a time when most of the other engineering schools trained students for public service. As the scientific discoveries in this era were beginning to have a major impact on industrial development in Europe, a new breed of engineers with a broad and rigorous knowledge of sciences and mathematics were needed in order for France to develop its industry and consequently compete amongst the world's superpowers.

The school was initially located in various premises in Paris, including Hotel Salé (which now hosts the Picasso Museum) and buildings which now belong to Conservatoire National des Arts et Métiers. Lavallée served as the first president of École Centrale.

In 1857, Lavallée transferred the ownership of the school to the French state in order to ensure its sustainability. Under Napoleon's initiative for an imperial university, the school was then temporarily renamed as École Impériale des Arts et Manufactures.

In 1862, graduates of the school were awarded accredited graduate diplomas in engineering, with the official academic title of 'ingénieur des arts et manufactures', which was the first of its kind in France.

The school was transferred in 1969 to a new campus located in Châtenay-Malabry. The Châtenay-Malabry campus was designed by architect Jean Fayeton, and was inaugurated by President Georges Pompidou, who was accompanied on this occasion by Robert Galley. The school was renamed as École Centrale des Arts et Manufactures.

In 2015, the school formed a strategic alliance with Supélec to create CentraleSupélec, which is part of the University of Paris-Saclay. The new campus is located in Gif-sur-Yvette, approximately 20 km from the center of Paris.

== Partnerships ==
École Centrale Paris was one of the Centrale Graduate Schools associated as the Groupe Centrale network with its sister institutes (Lille, Lyon, Marseille, Nantes, Beijing, Hyderabad (with Mahindra Group) and Casablanca).

Since 1837, the school had established several international partnerships (double degrees, exchanges, research collaboration) with the world's leading universities, such as California Institute of Technology, University of Cambridge, ETH Zurich, Georgia Institute of Technology, Harvard University, Indian Institutes of Technology, KAIST, Princeton University, Universidad Politécnica de Madrid, Massachusetts Institute of Technology, Politecnico di Milano, National University of Singapore, Stanford University, University of Toronto, Tsinghua University, TU Delft and the Technical University of Munich. It was a founding member of the TIME (Top Industrial Managers for Europe) network among top engineering schools in Europe, and also a member of the UniverSud Paris and the CESAER association of European engineering schools.

== Campus ==
Initially located in the Hôtel de Juigné (now Hôtel Salé and home to the Musée Picasso), the main campus of the school was transferred to rue Montgolfier in 1884, where it stayed until 1969. Its current location neighbours the Parc de Sceaux.

Former location of the École Centrale, rue Montgolfier in Paris (3rd arrondissement):

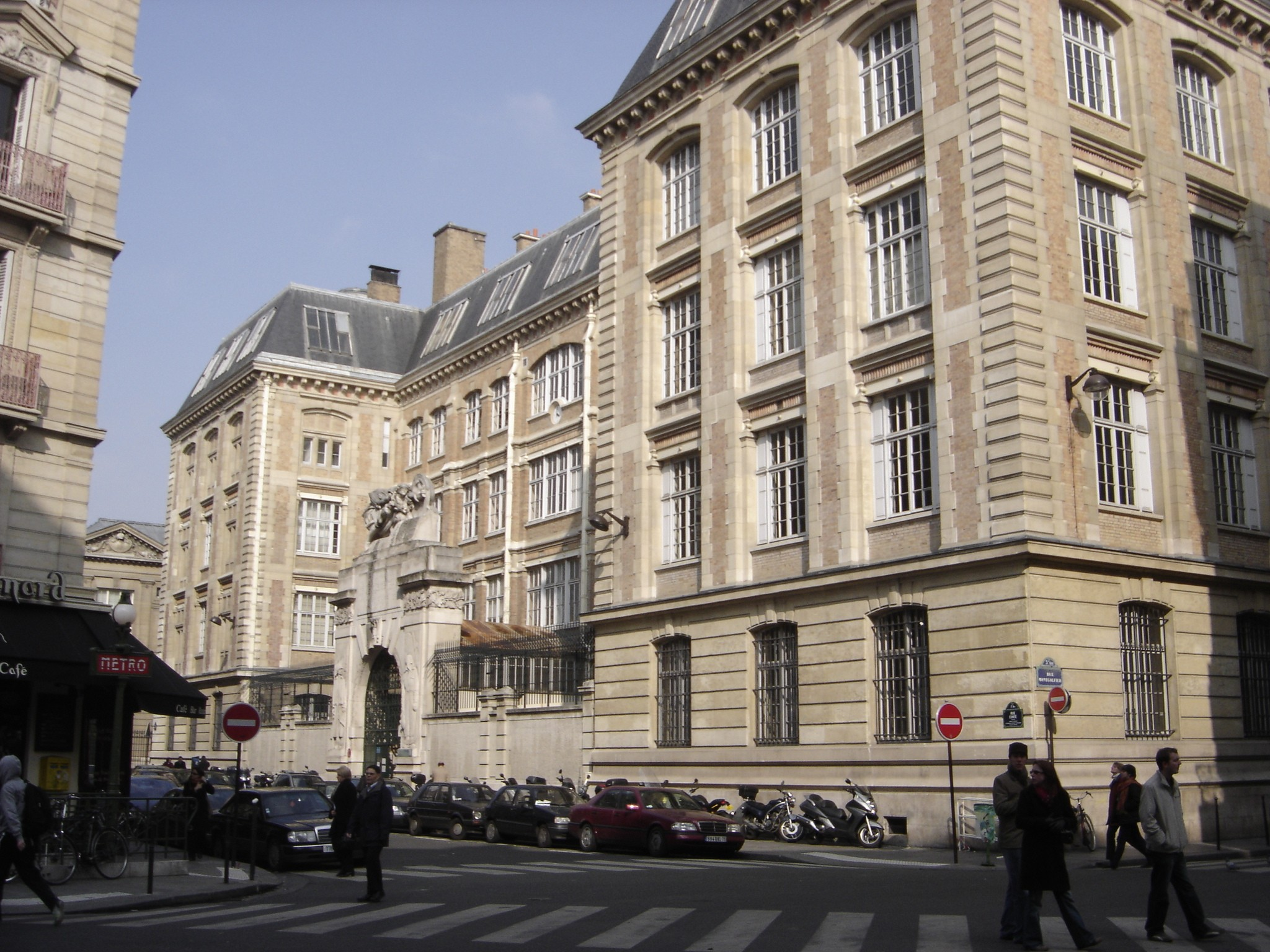

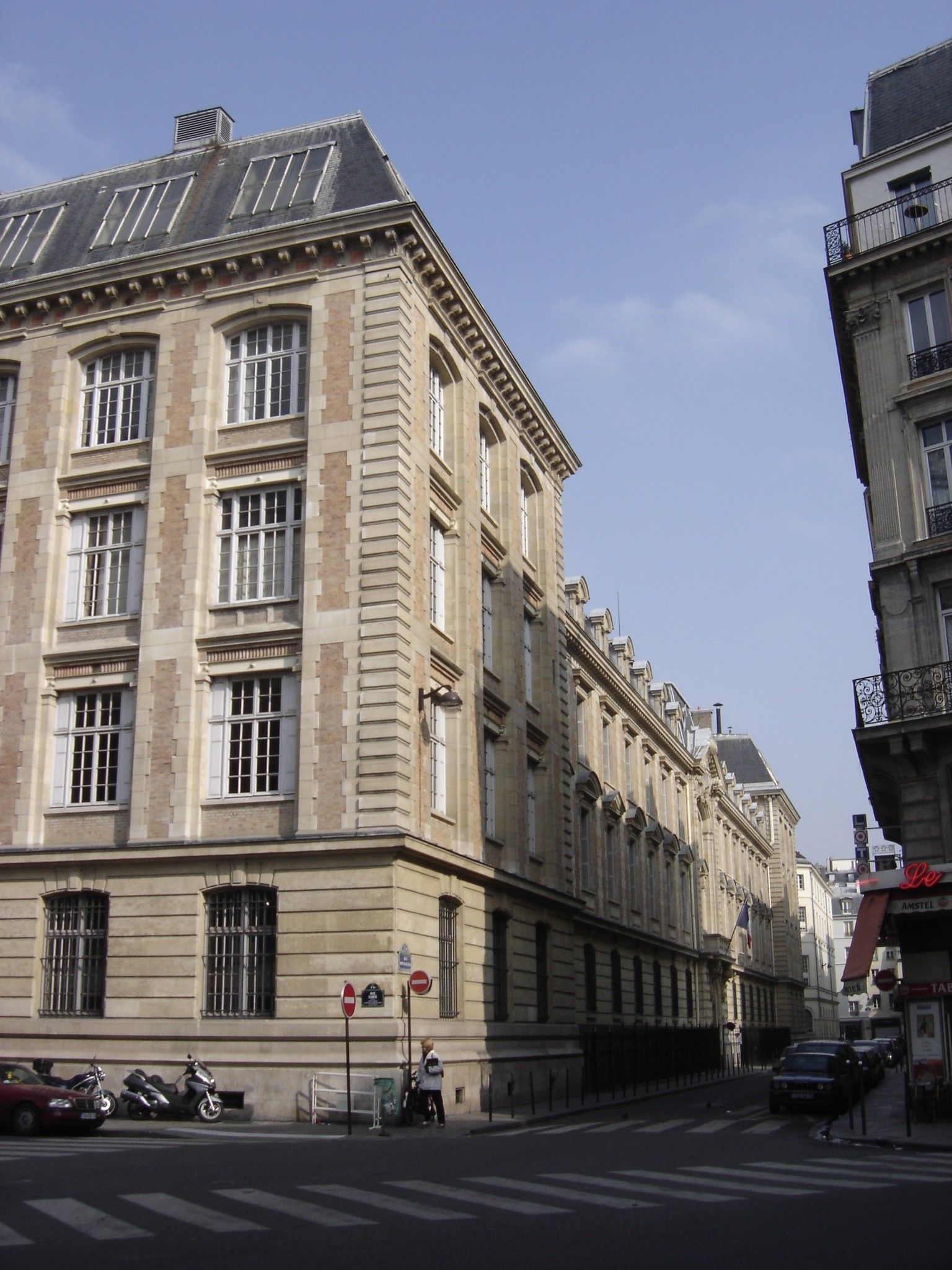

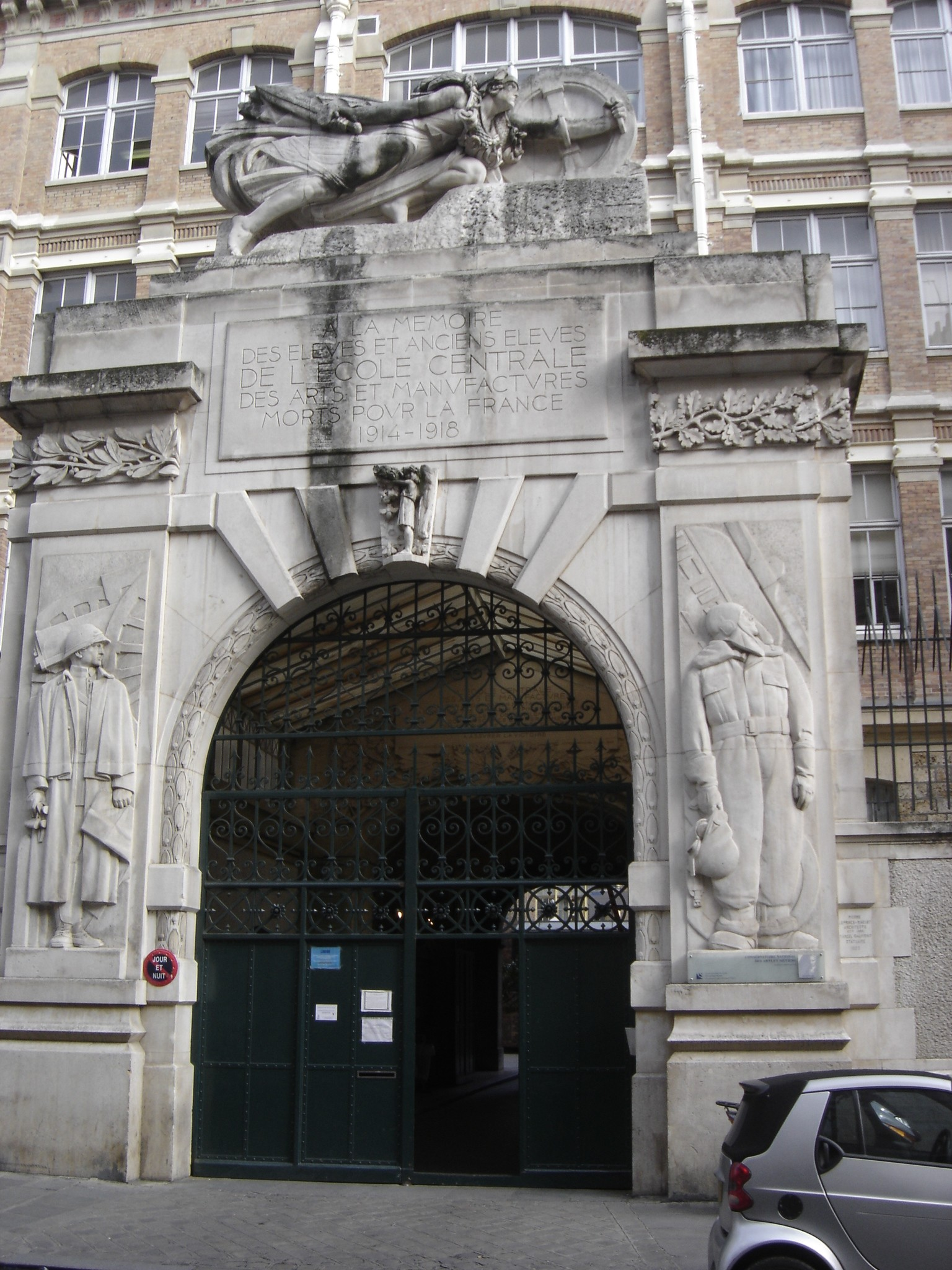

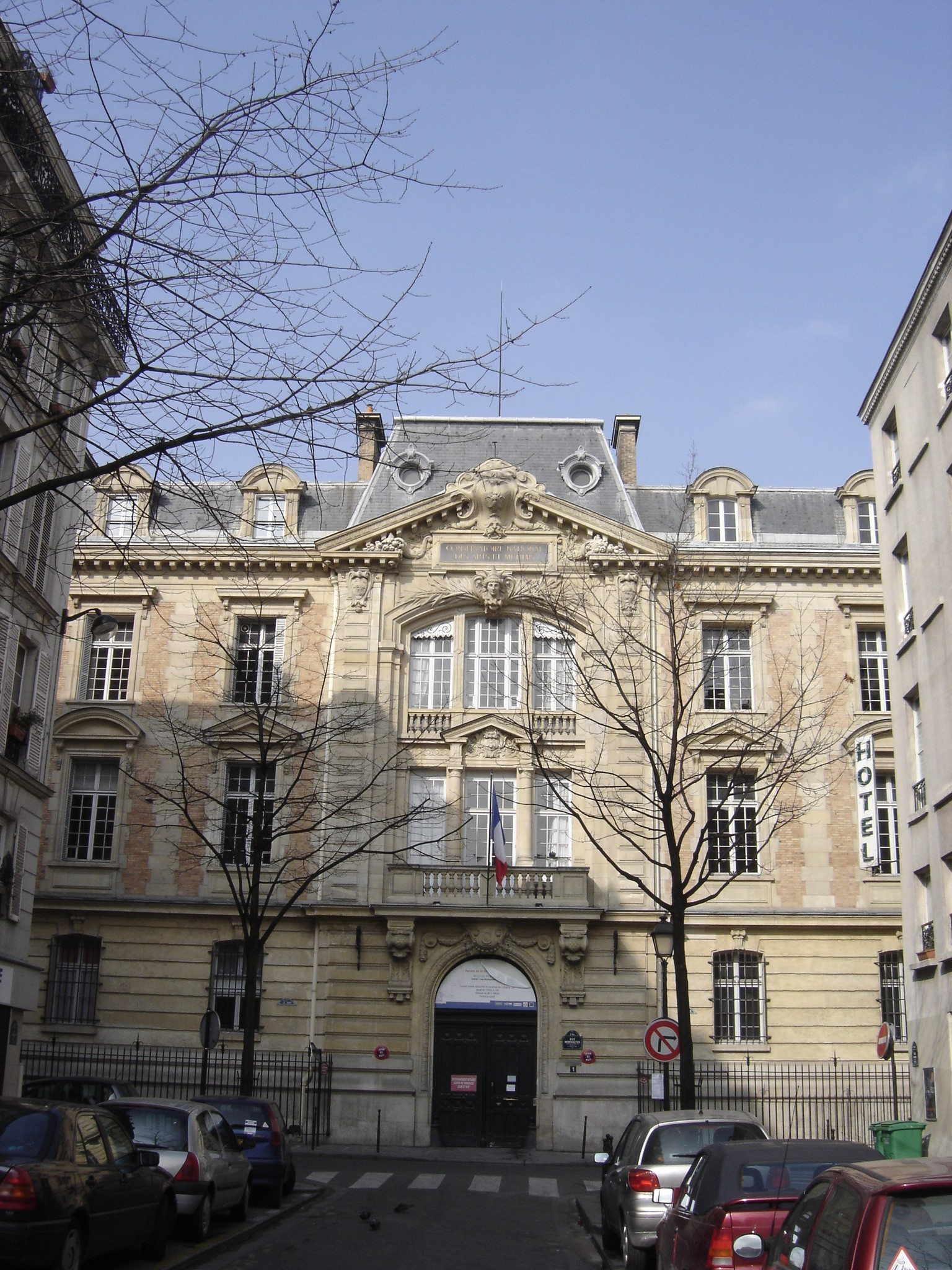

The school is now located at Châtenay-Malabry, Hauts-de-Seine, a southern suburb of Paris (in the Île-de-France region), next to the Parc de Sceaux and its Château de Sceaux. Within the main campus at Châtenay Malabry, ECP hosts eight laboratories:

1. Molecular and Macroscopic Energy, Combustion
2. System Analysis and Macroeconomics Modeling
3. Industrial Engineering
4. Chemical Engineering and Materials Processing Laboratory
5. Applied Mathematics
6. Soil and Structure Mechanics
7. Technology and Strategy
8. Solids Structure and Properties

Most of the 2000 students at École Centrale Paris stay in dedicated on-campus student residences, which is located near the research labs and easily accessible via public transport.

Following the merger of the school with Supelec, now forming CentraleSupelec, the progressive move of the campus has started from Chatenay-Malabry to Gif-sur-Yvette.

== Admission ==
Most French students who were admitted to École Centrale Paris had completed 2 to 3 years of post high school education in sciences through the classes préparatoires or prépas, which corresponds to freshman and sophomore years at US universities. The classes préparatoires is itself a selective and academically intensive program that admits less than top 10% of high school graduates in France each year. The entrance examination to the grandes écoles including École Centrale Paris is taken by students only at the end of their second year in prépas (Mathématiques spéciales).

For its flagship degree program leading to the French engineer's degree (Diplôme d'ingénieur), in 2016 for instance, École Centrale Paris recruited among the top 4% candidates from prépas for a quota of about 400 students, in addition to some 50 international students from top foreign universities after an equivalently selective process.

International students are first selected internally by their respective home universities on the basis of academic performance (within top 10% GPA) and receive additional training in various subjects including mathematics, sciences, computing, and French language for at least 1–2 years on top of their undergraduate degree program requirements. International students then apply and compete for admission to each grande école via written and oral examinations, and the application must include 2 referrals by professors, a record of extracurricular achievements, internship or research/project experiences, and a motivation letter.

Lastly, a small number of places for the engineer degree program is reserved for French university graduates who have excelled in a relevant 3-year bachelor's degree program.

== Curriculum ==
The general engineering program at Centrale was multidisciplinary and typically lasted between 3 and 4 years. The curriculum was similar to those offered at other general engineering schools (écoles d'ingénieurs généralistes). All courses were taught in either French or English.

During the first year (Tronc Commun, or Common Core), students were required to study several subjects in science (mathematics, quantum physics, biology...), engineering (continuum mechanics, heat transfer, algorithms, programming...), as well as social sciences (economics, management, foreign languages...). In the second year, students were given the option to choose elective courses but with heavy emphasis in science nevertheless. The first two years were also used to train students in various research, startup and industry projects. In the third year, students could choose to major (specialize) in a particular field depending on their academic and professional interests. Upon graduation, students received the degree of Diplôme d'Ingénieur (equivalent to Master of Science) along with the title of Ingénieur diplômé, which was more commonly called Ingénieur centralien.

== The Graduate School ==
The school offered a broad range of specialized master's programmes in science and engineering (one-year or two-year programs).

It also offered various PhD programmes for holders of a master's degree. More than 200 doctoral candidates currently work in one of the eight laboratories of the school.

== Alumni ==
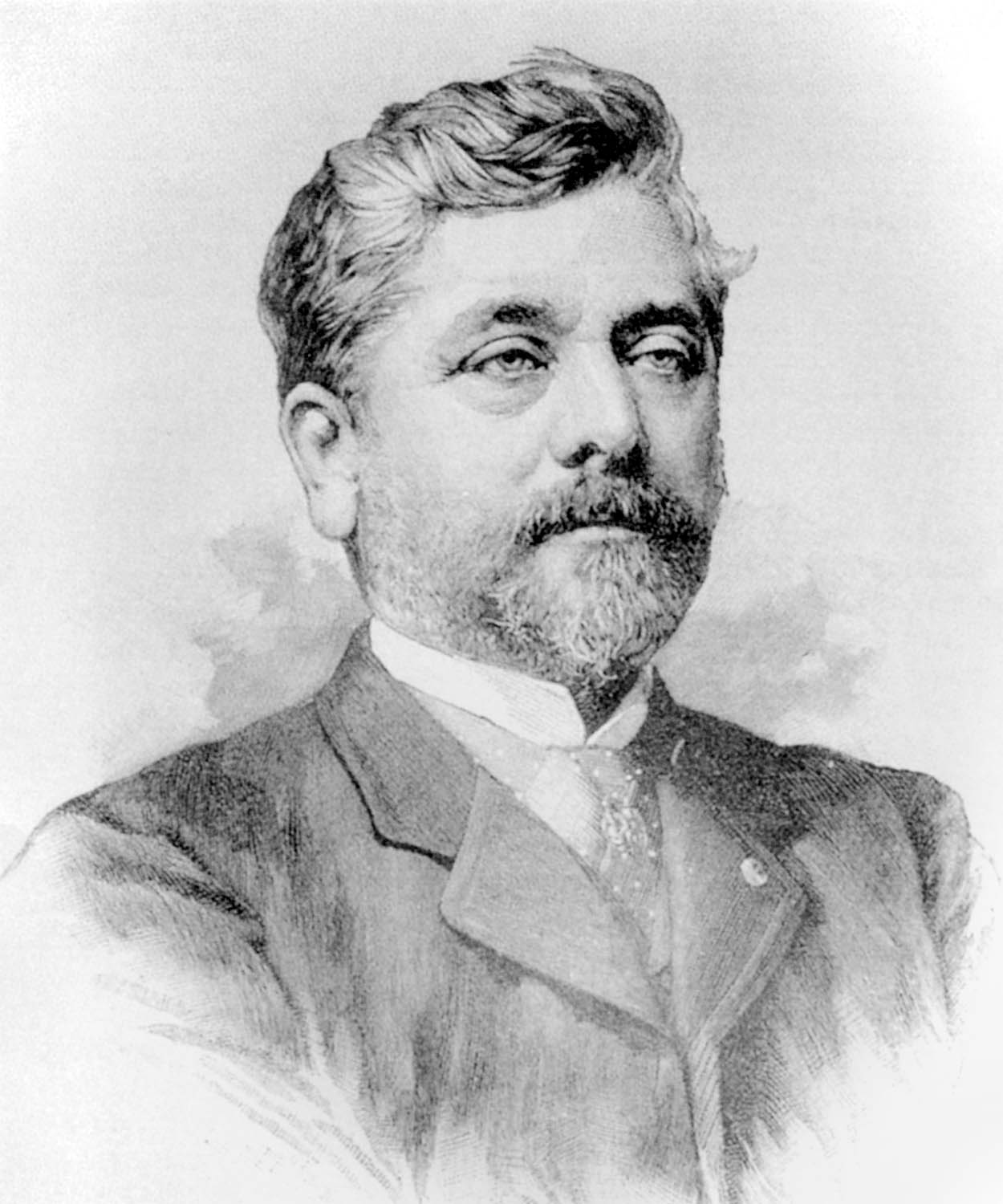
Gustave Eiffel, designed the Eiffel Tower and internal structure of the Statue of Liberty (Liberty Enlightening the World) in New York

The following is a non-exhaustive list of notable alumni of Ecole Centrale Paris, also commonly known as Centraliens or Pistons, which is a reference to the piston engine as one of the key innovations that powered the French Industrial Revolution.

Name (Year of graduation):

- Norbert Rillieux (1830), inventor of the multiple-effect evaporator
- Gustave Eiffel (1855), designer of the Eiffel Tower and the internal structure of the Statue of Liberty
- Édouard von Jaunez (1834–1916), businessman, engineer, and politician
- William Le Baron Jenney (1856), architect of the first steel framed building in Chicago
- Georges Leclanché (1860), inventor of Leclanché cell
- Émile Levassor and René Panhard (1864), founders of the first car manufacturing company, Panhard et Levassor
- André Michelin (1877), founder of Michelin
- Edmond Coignet (1879), a pioneer of reinforced concrete
- Georges Vésier (1882), president of the Compagnie française des métaux
- Louis Blériot (1895), aviation pioneer, first pilot to cross the Channel
- Georges Darrieus, French aeronautical engineer, inventor of the Darrieus wind turbine
- Armand Peugeot (1895), founder of automobile maker Peugeot (Peugeot PSA)
- René Lorin (1901), French aeronautical engineer, patented the first ramjet engine
- Solomon Lefschetz (1905), American mathematician
- Pierre-Georges Latécoère (1906), aeronautics pioneer, founder of Latécoère and Aéropostale (later Air France)
- Marcel Schlumberger (1907), co-founder of Schlumberger Limited
- Etienne Oehmichen (1908), pioneer of helicopters
- Boris Vian (1942), writer
- Mehdi Bazargan, former Iranian Prime Minister
- Francis Bouygues (1947), founder of Bouygues
- Jacques Maisonrouge (1948), Corporate Executive at IBM
- Gérard Pélisson (1955), founder of the Accor group (Novotel, Sofitel, Mercure, All Seasons hotels)
- Robert Peugeot, Peugeot holding president as of 2005
- Antoine (1966), singer-songwriter, navigator
- Henri Gouraud (1967), computer scientist
- Sébastien Candel (1968), physicist, Vice President of the French Academy of Sciences
- Justin Ndioro (1972), former Cameroonian Minister of Finances (1993–1996)
- Étienne Klein, physicist and professor, Research Director of the CEA
- François Goulard (1976), French delegate minister for research (2005–2007)
- Benoît Potier (1979), CEO of Air Liquide
- Carlos Tavares (1981), former CEO of Stellantis
- Pierre Chappaz (1982), founder of Kelkoo
- Jean-Loïc Galle (1982), President and CEO of Thales Alenia Space
- Charbel Farhat (1983), Vivian Church Hoff Professor of Aircraft Structures in the School of Engineering and inaugural James and Anna Marie Spilker Chair of the Department of Aeronautics and Astronautics, at Stanford University; Member of the National Academy of Engineering (US); Member of the Royal Academy of Engineering (UK); and Member of the Lebanese Academy of Sciences
- Bernard Liautaud (1984), founder of Business Objects
- Édouard Michelin (born 1963) (1987), former CEO of Michelin
- Driss Ben-Brahim (1987), investor and highest paid trader in London
- Charles Beigbeder (1988), CEO of Poweo
- Gilbert Daniel Nessim (1991), professor of chemistry at Bar-Ilan University
- Bruno Iksil (1991), JPMorgan Chief Investments Trader, a.k.a. the 'London Whale'
- Valerie Masson-Delmotte (1993, 1996), climate scientist
- Jean-Sebastien Jacques (1994), Rio Tinto CEO
- Fabrice Tourre (2000), the 'Fabulous Fab'
- Stephane Bancel (1995), CEO of Moderna
- Olivier Pomel (1999), Founder and CEO of Datadog
- Alexis Lê-Quôc (1999), Founder and CTO of Datadog
- Bernard Liataud (1984), Founder and CEO of BusinessObjects and Balderton Capital
- Jean-Baptiste Kempf (2006), Creator of VLC media player and VideoLAN
- Soulaymane Kachani, Columbia University's Senior Vice Provost

== Notable faculty ==
- Paul Appell – mathematician
- Raymond Barre – economist, vice president of the European Commission, French prime minister
- Sébastien Candel – physicist, president of the French Academy of Sciences
- Jean-Daniel Colladon – engineer and physicist
- Gustave-Gaspard Coriolis – physicist, known for the Coriolis effect
- Jean-Baptiste Dumas – chemist, known for atomic weights
- Jacques Hadamard – mathematician
- Étienne Klein – physicist and philosopher of science
- Joseph Liouville – mathematician
- Anselme Payen – chemist, discovered the first enzyme
- Eugène Péclet – physicist, known for the Péclet number
- Émile Picard – mathematician

== See also ==
- Education in France
