= Sidi Ahmed, Saïda =

Sidi Ahmed
- Commune and town
- Location in Algeria
- Coordinates: 34°32′57″N 0°15′31″E
- Country: Algeria
- Province: Saïda Province
- Time zone: UTC+1 (CET)

Sidi Ahmed is a town and commune in Saïda Province in north-western Algeria.
