= Brahim Ferradj =

Algerian footballer (born 1987)

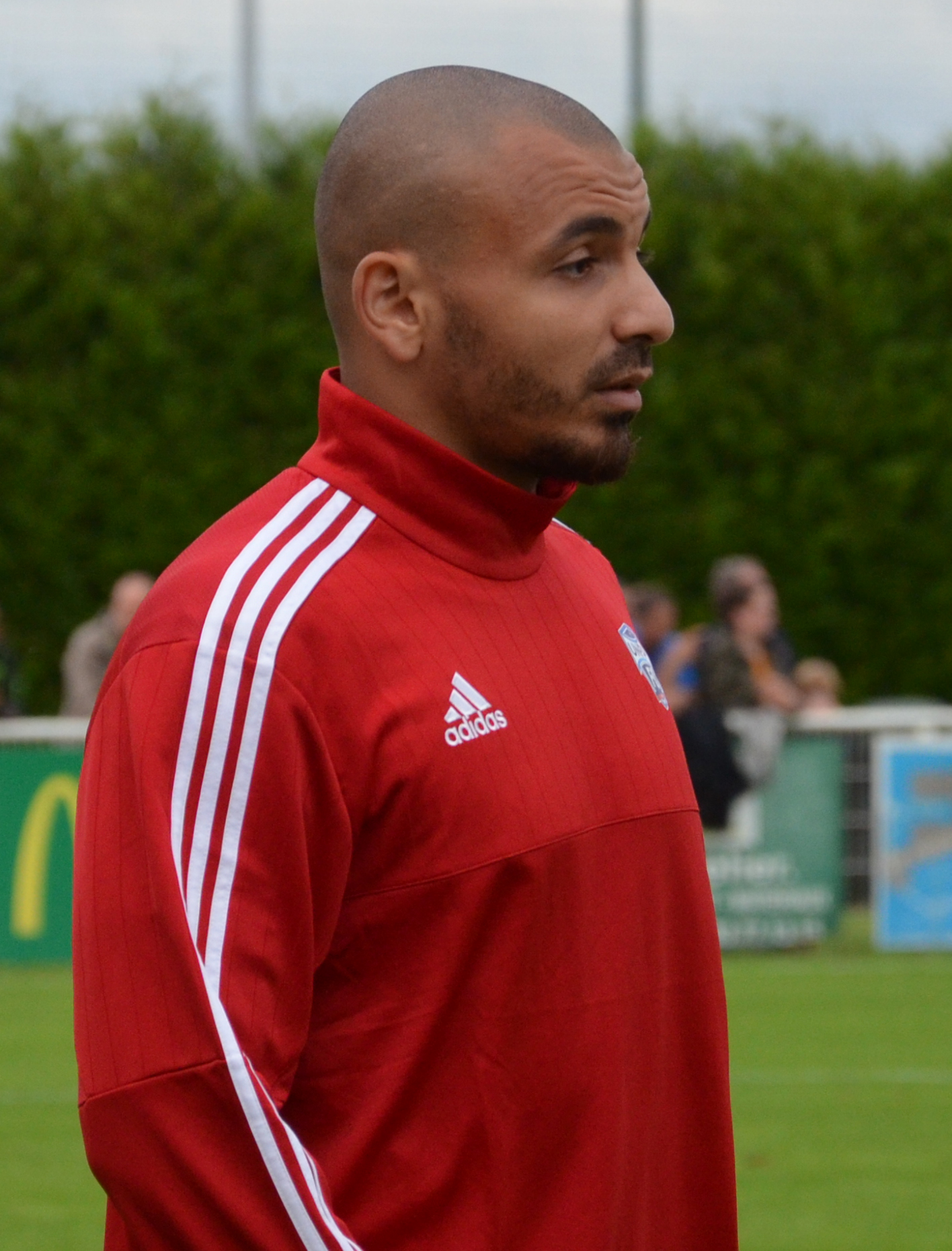
- Ferradj in 2016

Personal information
- Full name: Brahim Ferradj
- Date of birth: 4 September 1987 (age 39)
- Place of birth: Saint-Étienne, France
- Height: 1.72 m (5 ft 8 in)
- Positions: Defender; midfielder

Youth career
- 2000–2007: Auxerre

Senior career*
Years	Team	Apps	(Gls)
2007–2014	Brest	130	(9)
2016–2017	Andrézieux	20	(0)
- * Club domestic league appearances and goals as of 01:11, 23 February 2019 (UTC) ‡ National team caps and goals as of 00:00, 15 May 2011 (UTC)

Brahim Ferradj (born 4 September 1987) is a former footballer who played as a fullback on both sides of the pitch, or as a defensive midfielder. Born in France, he elected to represent Algeria at international level.

== Club career ==
Ferradj played for Brest in the French Ligue 2 until May 2014 when his contract with the club expired without being renewed.

== International career ==
On 14 May 2011, Ferradj was called up to the Algerian national team for the first time for a 2012 Africa Cup of Nations qualifier against Morocco.
