= Hounet =

Coordinates: 35°07′N 0°09′W

- Commune and town
- Interactive map of Hounet
- Country: Algeria
- Province: Saïda Province
- Time zone: UTC+1 (CET)

Hounet is a town and commune in Saïda Province in northwestern Algeria.
