= Brahim Mahrez =

French-Algerian reggae artist

Brahim
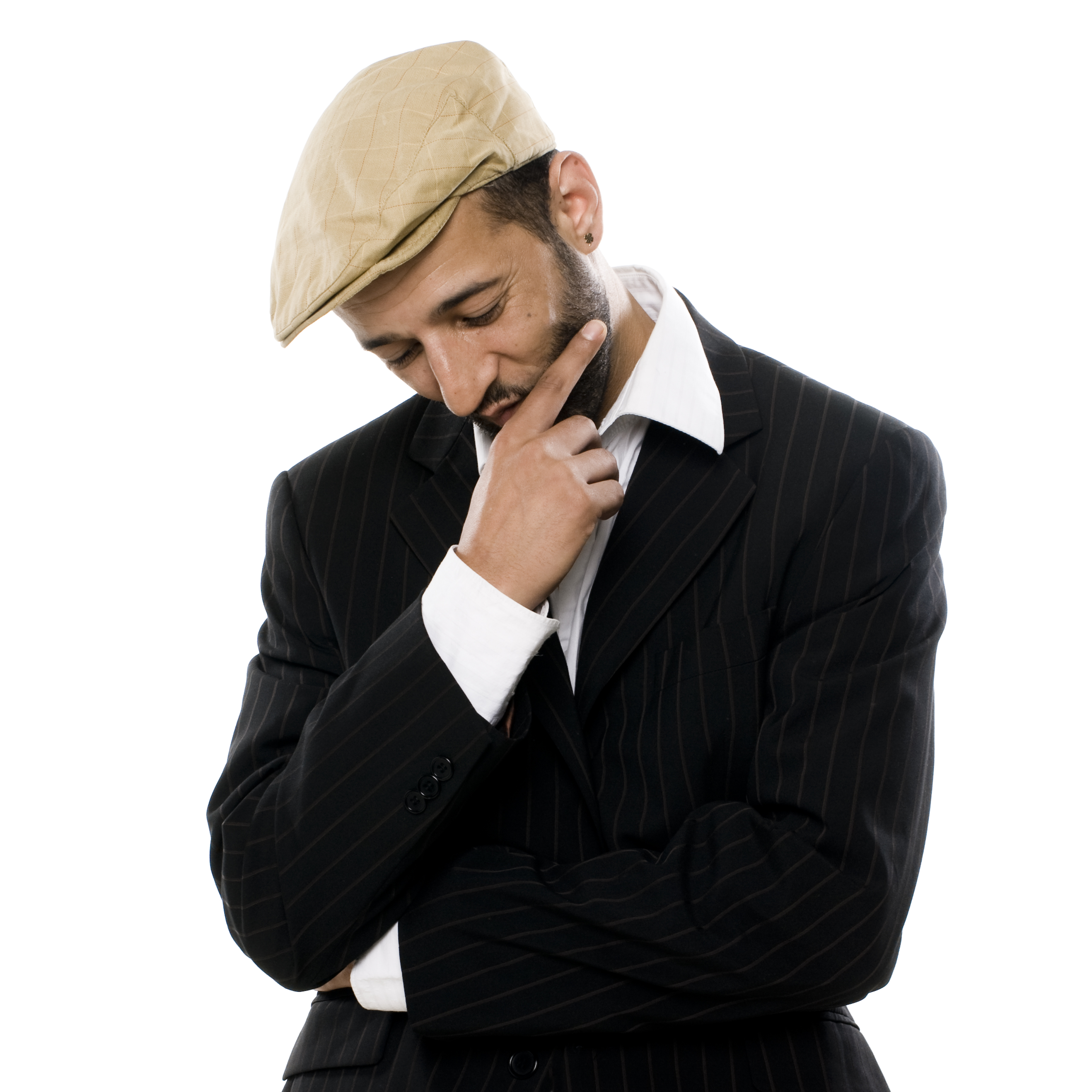

Background information
- Birth name: Brahim Mahrez
- Born: Algeria
- Origin: French artist of Algerian origin
- Genres: Reggae, ragga, dub
- Occupation(s): Singer, songwriter, musician
- Years active: 1989 – present
- Labels: Inca, Baco Records

Brahim Mahrez known by his mononym Brahim is French- Algerian reggae and ragga singer. He has released three albums to date.

He spent his youth in Tours, France. He was part of Wadada Sound System as their vocalist between 1989 and 1995, before leaving them for a solo career. He appeared on a mixtape released by Cutkiller. His first solo studio album Dans quel monde on vit was recorded in Jet Star studios in London and was produced by Yovo and Giovanny and sold more than 10,000 copies. He toured France in promotion of the album. He opened for Toots and the Maytals in their French tour. He also appeared in festivals. His second album was Toujours sur la route in 2009, with personal engaging lyrics about social issues, a theme he followed in his third album Sans haine in 2012 released on Baco Records.

== Discography ==
=== Albums ===
- 2000: Dans quel monde on vit
- 2009: Toujours sur la route
- 2012: Sans haine
- 2014: Déconnecté
