= El Hassasna =

Coordinates: 34°49′27″N 0°19′23″E

- Commune and town
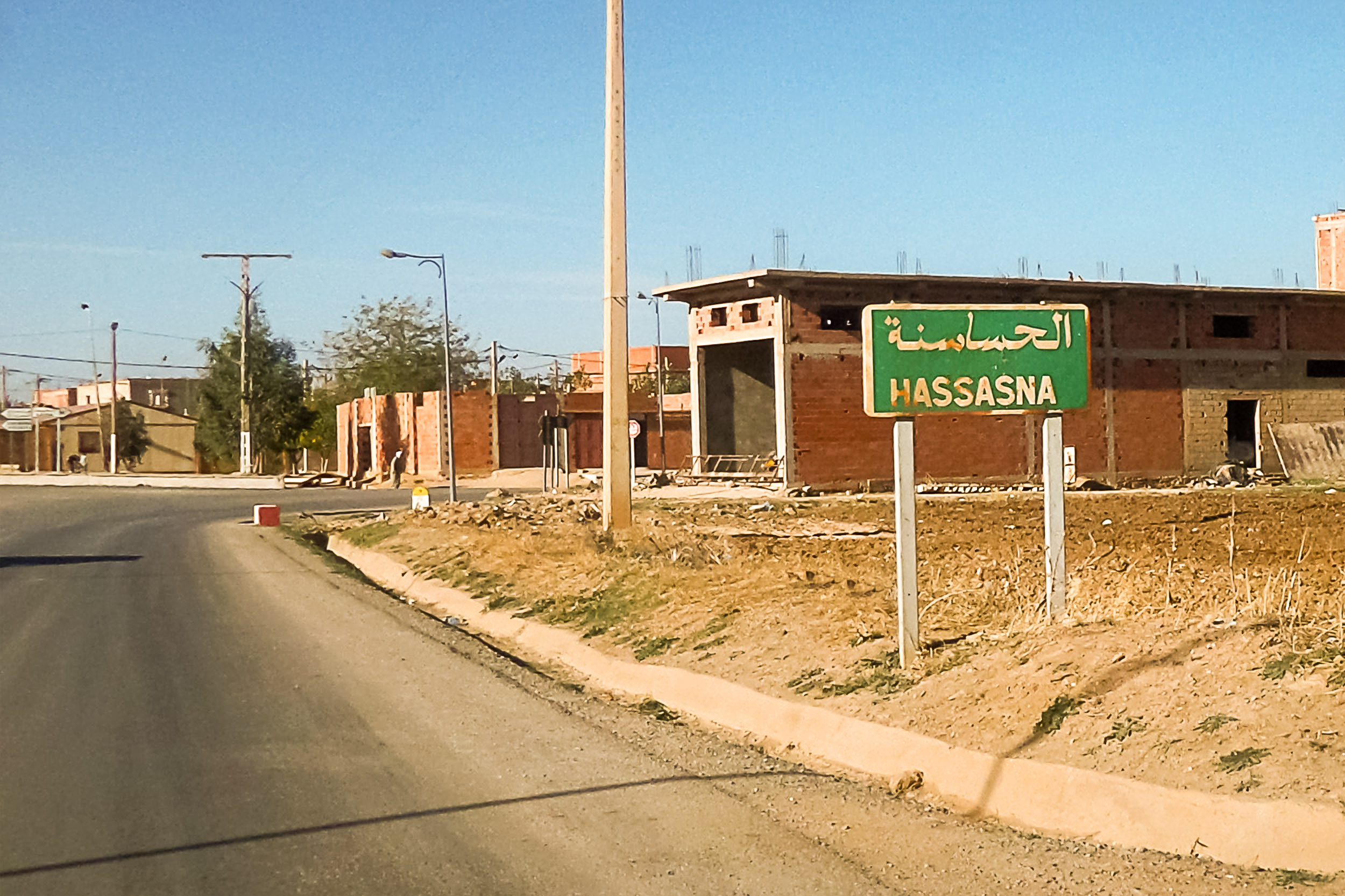
- Interactive map of El Hassasna
- Country: Algeria
- Province: Saïda Province
- Time zone: UTC+1 (CET)

El Hassasna is a town and commune in Saïda Province in northwestern Algeria.
