= Sidi Brahim Riahi =

Brahim Riahi
- Born: Abou Ishak Ibrahim Ben Abdelkader Riahi; 1766; Testour, Tunisia
- Died: August 7, 1850 (aged 83–84)
- Other names: إبراهيم الرياحي

Ibrahim Riahi, birth name Abou Ishak Ibrahim Ben Abdelkader Riahi (1766 – August 7, 1850), was a Tunisian ambassador, theologian and saint. A Sunni Muslim scholar, he was also a poet. He was the grandfather of Ali Riahi.

== Biography ==
Ibrahim Riahi learned about the group of academics and lawyers from Tunisia, in particular: Hamza Al-Jibas, Saleh Al-Kawash, Muhammad Al-Fassi, Omar Bin Qassem Al-Mahjoub, Hassan Al-Sharif, Ahmed Bou Khurais, Ismail Al-Tamimi, Al-Taher Ben Massoud, and others.

Sidi Brahim frequented from a young age a kouttab in Testour and showed talent for religious sciences and learning the Quran. Upon his arrival in Tunis, around 1782, he studied at the Haouanet Achour madrassah and then at the Bir Lahjar madrassah.

Around 1790, he began teaching at Zitouna University where the future ministers Ibn Abi Dhiaf and Béji Messaoudi as well as the greatest theologians of the time, such as Mohamed Bayram IV and Mahmoud Kabadou, were among his students.

In 1801, he was part of an embassy in Morocco, where he stayed for several months; there he discovered the Sufi tariqa of the Tijaniyya and introduced it to Tunisia on his return.

In 1839, he was in charge of another important embassy in Constantinople, capital of the Ottoman Empire which was then the suzerain of Tunisia. This mission aims to cancel the heavy annual tribute that the Bey of Tunis is obliged to provide to the Ottoman Sultan as a token of his vassalage.

== Sidi Brahim Riahi Mausoleum ==
Sidi Brahim is buried with some of his sons, sheikhs and theologians like him, in his mausoleum in the Sidi Brahim Riahi street in the medina of Tunis named Sidi Brahim Riahi Mausoleum.

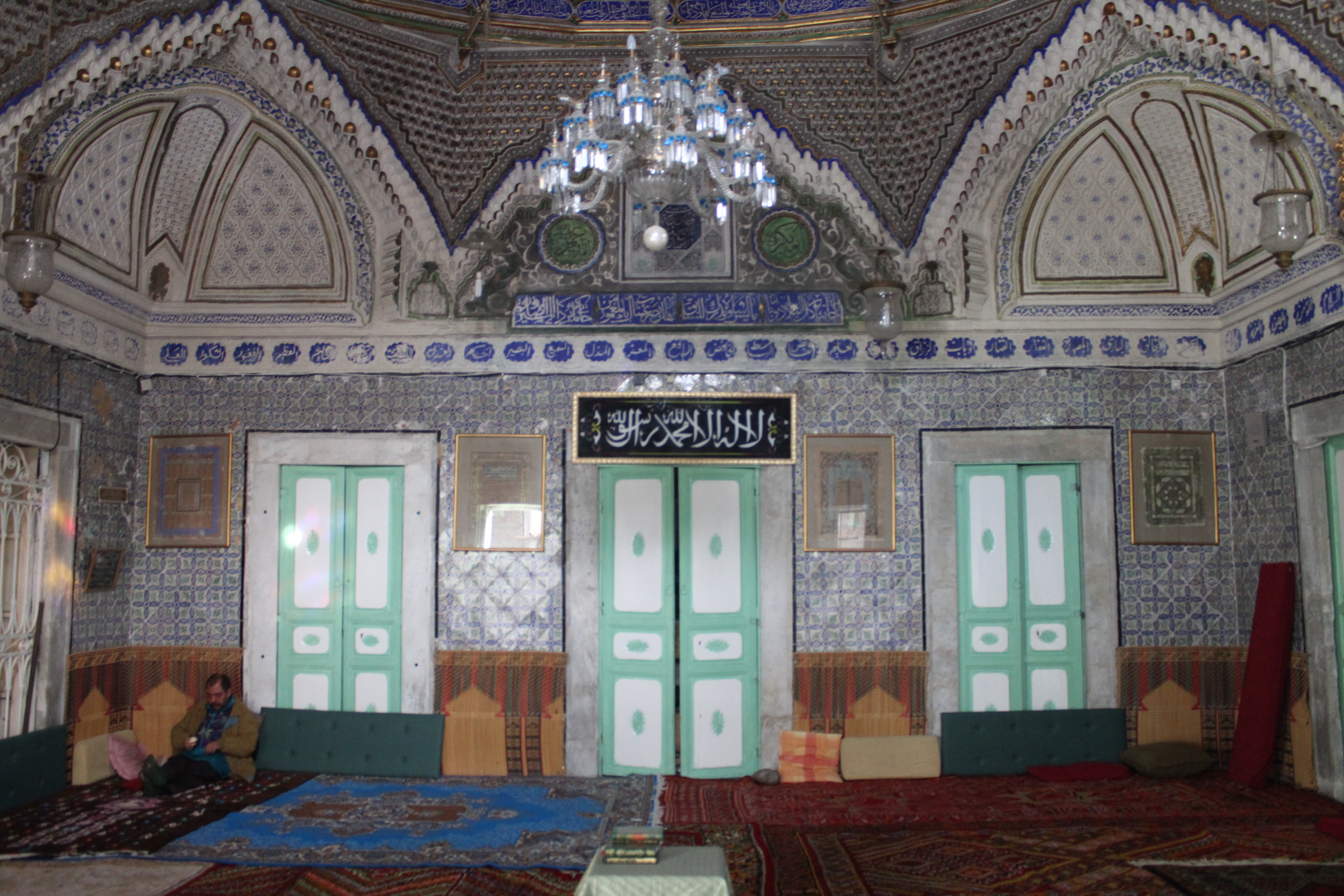
Dome zaouia Sidi Brahim Riahi
