= Moulay Larbi =

Coordinates: 34°39′N 0°01′E

- Commune and town
- Interactive map of Moulay Larbi
- Country: Algeria
- Province: Saïda Province
- Time zone: UTC+1 (CET)

Moulay Larbi is a town and commune in Saïda Province in northwestern Algeria.
