= Doui Thabet =

Coordinates: 34°53′35″N 0°04′40″W

- Commune and town
- Interactive map of Doui Thabet
- Country: Algeria
- Province: Saïda Province
- Time zone: UTC+1 (CET)

Doui Thabet is a town and commune in Saïda Province in northwestern Algeria.
