= Sidi Brahim (disambiguation) =

- Sidi Brahim a commune of Sidi Bel Abbès Province of Algeria
- Sidi Brahim (wine), range of branded wines produced in the Atlas mountains, mainly in Algeria but also in Tunisia and Morocco
- Sidi Brahim Barracks, former army barracks in Étain, France
- Sidi Brahim Riahi (1766-1850), Tunisian ambassador, theologian and saint

== See also ==
- Battle of Sidi-Brahim, in French Algeria between Berber and French troops, 22 to 25 September 1845
