= Prix Mohamed Brahim Bouallou =

Moroccan short story award

The Prix Mohamed Brahim Bouallou de la nouvelle très courte is a Moroccan literary prize awarded to very short stories. In 2007 the first prize went to short story writer Malika Chajai, the second prize to Loubna El Yazidi and the third to Sami Dekkaki. The prize was named after Moroccan writer Mohamed Ibrahim Bouallou.
