= Tircine =

Coordinates: 34°54′05″N 0°33′17″E

- Commune and town
- Interactive map of Tircine
- Country: Algeria
- Province: Saïda Province
- Time zone: UTC+1 (CET)

Tircine is a town and commune in Saïda Province in north-western Algeria.
