= Youb =

Coordinates: 34°55′N 0°13′W

- Commune and town
- Interactive map of Youb
- Country: Algeria
- Province: Saïda Province
- Time zone: UTC+1 (CET)

Youb is a town and commune in Saïda Province in north-western Algeria. Youb is 45 km west of the Saïda and has some 25,000 inhabitants. Its post code is 20008.

== History ==
The commune contains the prehistoric site of Timzighine, which is a scheduled monument in Algeria.

It bore the name Berthelot before independence and had the name Daoud after independence. It is a mainly agricultural region situated in a forested area. During the Algerian civil war in the 1990s, many inhabitants of the rural areas of the Saida region and even from Sidi-bel-abbès fled their villages to live in the commune of Youb and many of them have remained there without returning to their homes, although they have benefited from State aid to restart their agricultural activities. Part of the forest of Sidi Douma located in the commune was ravaged by a major fire in June 2005. Also most of citizens of this village own a farm in Ouled-Abdelkader called also “Laka” owned historically by Nasri origins.
