= Mohammed Ben Brahim =

Moroccan poet

El Houari Mohammed Ben Brahim Assarraj (Arabic: محمد بن إبراهيم بن السراج المراكشي; 1897–1955) was a poet from Morocco. He is especially well known as the poet of Marrakesh of the first part of the 20th century. He wrote poems for both king Mohammed V and for his opponent El Glaoui.

According to his biographer Omar Mounir he was "considered a nationalist by the French, a traitor by the nationalists, a alem by the man in the street and a rascal by the ulemas." Mohamed Ben Brahim studied at the Ben Youssef Madrasa in Marrakesh and the Al-Qarawiyyin University of Fes. He worked as a university professor for a short period and, after that as a journalist.

Many of Ben Brahim's poems are put to music and still popular in present-day Morocco. Karima Skalli is one of his work's interpreters.

Mehdi Khayat interprets Ben Brahim's poetry in his musical work, titled "Mehdi Khayat and the poet of Marrakesh".

== Bibliography ==
- Omar Mounir, Le Poète de Marrakech (=Shair Al-Hamra), Editions La Porte, Rabat, 2001. ISBN 9981-889-26-1
- Ben Brahim, Mohammed (1949). "Ilayka Ya Ni Ma Sadiq"(To you my dear friend). Tetuan, Morocco: Hassania Publishing Company
- Ahmed Cherkaoui-Ikbal, Le poète de Marrakech sous les tamis (1958)
- Abdelkrim Ghallab, L'Univers du Poète de Marrakech (1982)
- Ahmed al Khoulassa, Le Poète de Marrakech dans l'histoire de la littérature contemporaine (1987)
