= Sidi Boubekeur =

- Commune and town
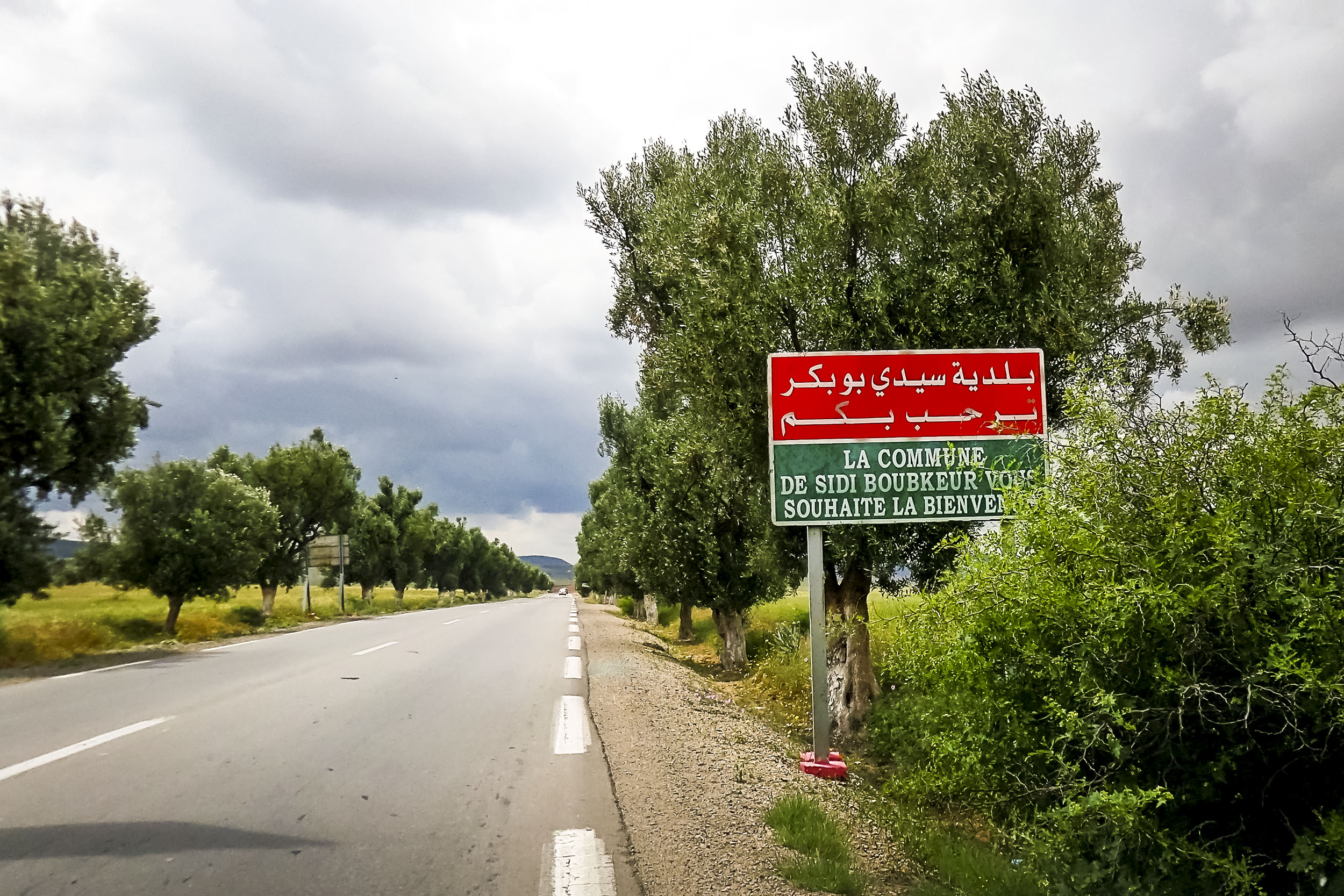
- Cafeteria in Sidi Boubekeur

- Location within Algeria
- Country: Algeria
- Province: Saïda Province
- Time zone: UTC+1 (CET)

Sidi Boubekeur (Arabic: سيدي بوبكر) is a town and commune in Saïda Province in north-western Algeria.
