= Sidi Amar, Saïda =

Sidi Amar
- Commune and town
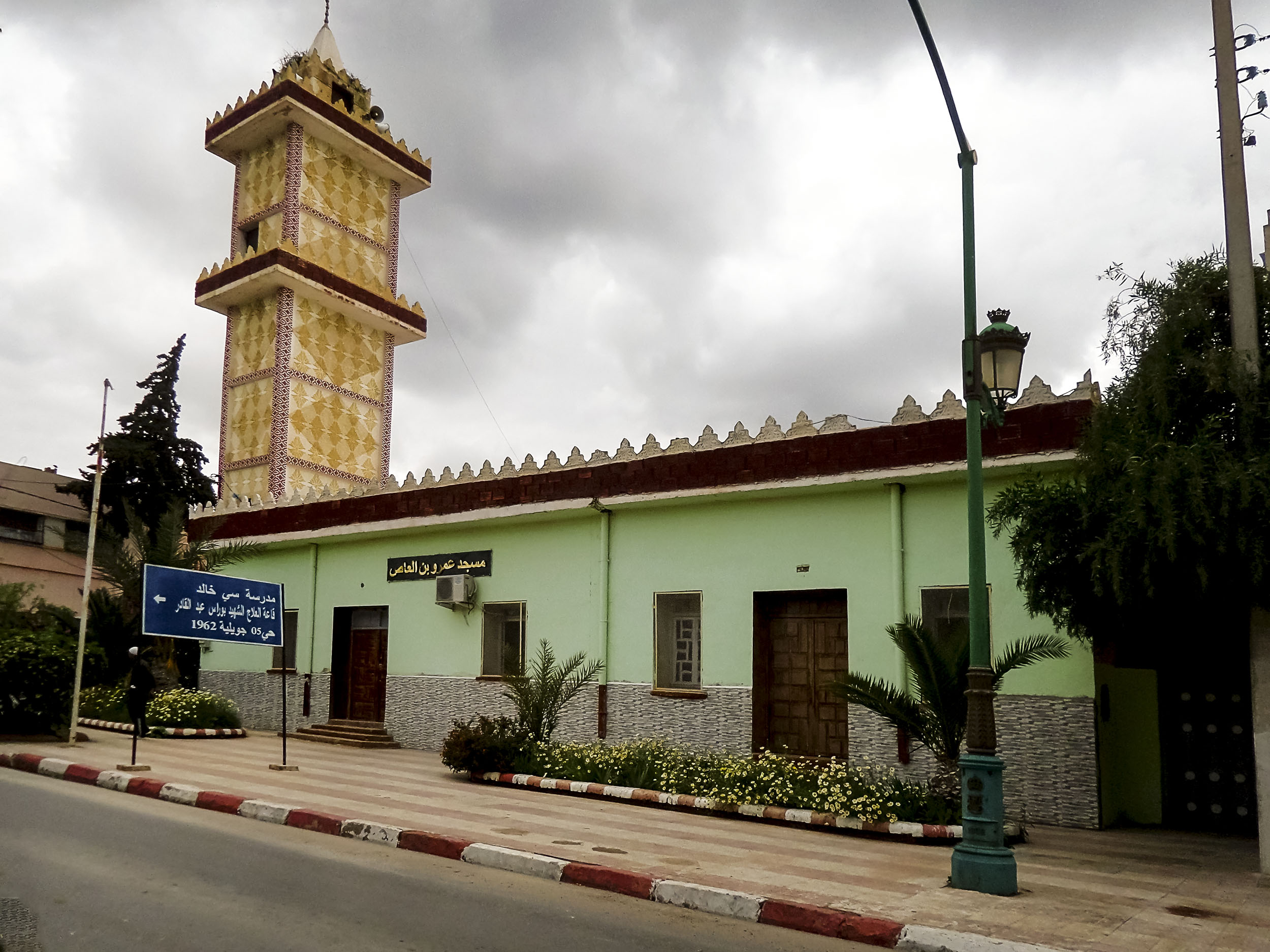

- Location within Algeria
- Country: Algeria
- Province: Saïda Province
- Time zone: UTC+1 (CET)

Sidi Amar is a town and commune in Saïda Province in north-western Algeria.
