= Ouled Khaled =

Coordinates: 34°52′36″N 0°09′10″E

- Commune and town
- Interactive map of Ouled Khaled
- Country: Algeria
- Province: Saïda Province
- Time zone: UTC+1 (CET)

Ouled Khaled is a town and commune in Saïda Province in north-western Algeria.
