= Ali Riahi =

Tunisian musician

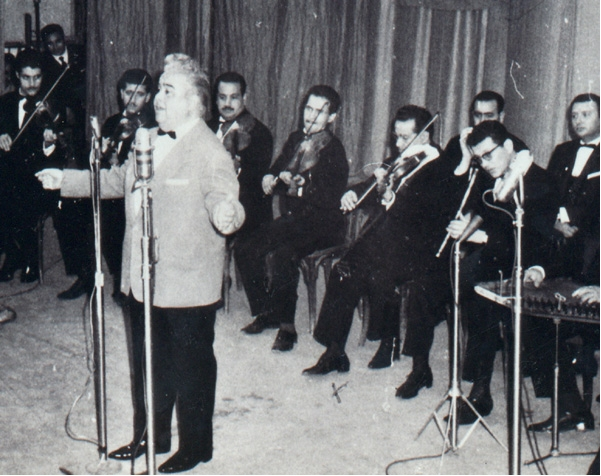
- Born: Ali Fethi Ben Mohamed Ben Brahim Riahi; March 30, 1912; Tunis
- Died: March 17, 1970 (aged 57)
- Other name: علي الرياحي
- Occupations: Singer, composer

Ali Fethi Ben Mohamed Ben Brahim Riahi (Arabic:علي الرياحي), (March 30, 1912 Tunis – March 17, 1970), was a Tunisian singer and composer. He is the grandson of Sidi Brahim Riahi.

In 1938, Othman Kaak invited Riahi to join the radio, which was still in its infancy.

In 1950, the BBC devoted a complimentary program to him. The documents highlight, among other things, its decoration in 1954 by Muhammad VIII al-Amin of Nichan al Iftikhar (former Tunisian honorary order).
