= Carl V. Thompson =

American engineer

Carl V. Thompson is an American engineer currently the Stavros Salapatas Professor of Materials Science and Engineering at Massachusetts Institute of Technology.

== Education ==
- SB, Materials Science and Engineering, MIT, 1976
- SM, Applied Physics, Harvard University, 1977
- PhD, Applied Physics, Harvard University, 1982
