= Ahmed Brahim (al-Qaeda) =

Member of al-Qaeda

Abdelhamid Abou Zeid
- Born: 1945 (age 80–81); Algeria
- Military career
- Allegiance: Al-Qaeda
- Branch: Al-Qaeda in Spain (?–2002)
- Service years: ?-2002
- Rank: chief financier for al-Qaeda in Spain

Ahmed Brahim (born 1945) is a convicted al-Qaeda member from Algeria. Spanish authorities arrested him in 2002 on charges that he was a chief financier for al-Qaeda in Spain. He is also alleged to have been a planner in the bombing of two US embassies in Kenya and Tanzania in 1998. Brahim is married to a Finnish national identified as Pirjo. Spanish counter-terrorism judge Baltasar Garzón has also alleged that Ahmed Brahim had "routine contacts" with Swiss-born Islamic scholar Tariq Ramadan in 1999.
