= List of INSEAD alumni =

INSEAD has more than 60,000 alumni worldwide across its degrees, comprising more than 150 nationalities.

The MBA program has produced the second-highest number of Financial Times Global 500 CEOs, behind Harvard Business School. It is amongst the largest 20 producers of ultra high-net-worth individuals across all educational institutions, and is also amongst the top 10 producers of billionaire alumni amongst global MBA programs. INSEAD's MBA alumni are fourth worldwide in terms of capital raised, founder count, and company count (only behind Harvard’s, Stanford’s, and Wharton’s).

This list shows 20 INSEAD alumni as billionaire, 7 as head of government/state, 30 as minister or cabinet member, 16 as member of legislation of countries around the world.

== Academia ==
- William, Lord Hague (MBA 1986), 106th Chancellor of University of Oxford, Former Leader of Conservative Party (UK), Former First Secretary of State and Secretary of State for Foreign & Commonwealth Affairs of the UK.
- Éric Labaye (MBA 1987), former Chairman and president of École Polytechnique and Institut Polytechnique de Paris.
- Helen Alexander (MBA 1984), former Chancellor of the University of Southampton (2011–2017), former CEO of The Economist Group (1997-2008), first female President of Confederation of British Industry.
- Julie Battilana (MSc in Management 2004 and PhD in Organizational Behavior 2006), the Joseph C. Wilson Professor of Business Administration at Harvard Business School and the Alan L. Gleitsman Professor of Social Innovation at the Harvard Kennedy School.
- Ian Goldin (AMP), Professor and Founding Director at the Oxford Martin School, University of Oxford.
- Jean-Claude Larreche (MBA 1970), Emeritus Professor, Alfred H. Heineken Chair of Marketing at INSEAD.
- Yoshihiro Kawai (MBA) Professor at University of Tokyo, Chairman of OECD Insurance and Private Pension Committee, Secretary General of the International Association of Insurance Supervisors (2003-2017)
- Ludovic Phalippou (PhD 2004), Professor of Financial Economics, University of Oxford.
- Christian Terwiesch (PhD 1997), Andrew M. Heller Professor at the Wharton School of the University of Pennsylvania.
- Miklos Sarvary (PhD 1996), the Carson Family Professor of Business and the faculty lead for the Media and Technology Program at Columbia Business School
- Raghavendra Rau (MSc in Management 1993, PhD in Management 1997), Sir Evelyn de Rothschild Professorship of Finance at the Judge Business School at the University of Cambridge
- Soumitra Dutta (Professor), Dean of Saïd Business School at the University of Oxford (2022-now), founding dean of SC Johnson College of Business at Cornell University (2012-2018)
- António Borges (Dean), Director of the European Department of the International Monetary Fund, Vice Chairman of Goldman Sachs International, Vice Governor of Banco de Portugal
- John Pollaers (MBA), Chancellor of Swinburne University of Technology (since 2019)

== Finance ==
- Tidjane Thiam (MBA 1988), Former CEO at Credit Suisse and Prudential.
- Paul Marshall (MBA), co-founder and chairman, Marshall Wace.
- António Horta Osório (MBA 1991), Former CEO at Lloyds Banking Group and Former Chairman at Credit Suisse.
- Henry Engelhardt (MBA 1988), Billionaire Founder of Admiral Group
- Susumu Fujimoto (MBA 1976), Vice president Mitsui Sumitomo Insurance Co., Ltd. and MS&AD Insurance Group
- Andrea Rossi (MBA), CEO of AXA Investment Managers (2013-now)
- Gonzalo Gortázar (MBA), CEO of Caixabank.
- Hoi Tung (MBA), Chairman/CEO at China Ping An Insurance Overseas Holdings
- Lin Lily (MBA 2006), Board of Directors member at Vanke, Former executive director, Vanke Overseas Investment Holding
- Charlie Nunn (MBA 2000), CEO, Lloyds Banking Group.
- Nathalie Rachou (MBA), Board member of UBS and Euronext.
- Bernard Brenninkmeijer (MBA), Board member of Vatican Bank
- Shanu S.P. Hinduja (IEP), Chairperson of Hinduja Bank, Chair of the Hinduja Foundation, and Co-Chair and Director of Hinduja Global Solutions Inc.
- Claire Dumas (IEP), Group CFO of Société Générale
- Andrew Sillitoe (MBA), Partner, co-CEO, Apax Partners (2014-now)
- David Morin (MBA), Managing Director, Head of North America, Private Equity at PSP Investments.
- Andrea Scerch (MBA), President of Latin America and the Caribbean of Mastercard, Member of Management Committee
- Eimear Creaven (MBA), Co-President, Global Partnerships of Mastercard, Member of Management Committee
- Meyrick Douglas (MBA), Senior Vice President and Chief Risk Officer of Prudential Financial
- Sandeep Dadlani (MBA), Executive Vice President, Chief Digital & Technology Officer, UnitedHealth Group
- Meera Sanyal (MBA 1983), Former CEO of Royal Bank of Scotland, India.
- Roberto Buaron (MBA), Chairman and CEO of First Atlantic Capital
- Philip Hampton (MBA), Former Chairman, J Sainsbury; Royal Bank of Scotland Group
- Huw van Steenis (MBA), Vice Chair of Oliver Wyman, Former Head of European Financials Services Research, Morgan Stanley
- Driss Ben-Brahim, Special Situations, GLG Partners
- Andrea Orcel (MBA), Former CEO, Banco Santander, CEO, UniCredit
- Anne Richards (MBA), CEO, Fidelity International
- Kenneth Courtis (MBA), former Vice-Chairman Asia, Goldman Sachs, former Chief Economist Deutsche Bank
- Lucy Quist (MBA), Head of Change Leadership, Morgan Stanley
- Wiebe Draijer (MBA 1991), CEO, Rabobank
- Federico Burgoni (MBA), Head, Group Strategy and Transformation of UOB
- Joshua Oigara (IEP), CEO of KCB Group.
- Breon Corcoran (MBA), CEO of IG Group.
- Lee Eun-ho (MBA), CEO of Lotte Insurance.
- Hussein Nagaty (CGM 2026), CMU Head at CIB Egypt.

== Healthcare and biotech ==
- André Hoffmann (businessman) (MBA 1990), Swiss billionaire businessman, vice chairman of Roche Holding.
- Rudolf Maag (MBA 1973), Swiss billionaire medical-device entrepreneur who developed Stratec Medical and merged it with Synthes; Forbes estimated his net worth at US$6.6 billion as of 31 October 2026.
- Wolfgang Marguerre (MBA 1972), German billionaire founder and chairman of Octapharma.
- Helge Lund (MBA 1991), chairman of BP, chairman of Novo Nordisk
- Yvonne Greenstreet (MBA 1992), CEO of Alnylam Pharmaceuticals.
- Franz Humer (MBA 1973), former chairman of Roche and Diageo
- Bernard Broermann (MBA), billionaire founder of Asklepios Kliniken.
- Said Darwazah (MBA), CEO and chairman of Hikma Pharmaceuticals.
- Claus Zieler (MBA 1991), President of Established Markets at Astellas Pharma
- Roch Doliveux (MBA), CEO of UCB
- Flemming Ørnskov (MBA), CEO of Galderma.
- Stefan Willich (MBA 1995)- Professor, Director of Institute of Social Medicine, Epidemiology and Health Economics at Charité, Founder and conductor of the World Doctors Orchestra.
- Jean-Marc Huët (MBA) Chairman of the Board of Directors of Lonza Group, former CFO Unilever.
- Elcin Barker Ergun (MBA), CEO of Menarini Group
- Philippe Drouet (Executive MBA), Chief Commercial Officer of CRISPR Therapeutics
- Que (Thanh) Dallara (MBA), Member of Executive Board, Executive Vice President and President for the Diabetes Operating Unit, Medtronic
- Carlos Jaureguizar (MBA), CEO of Sanitas and Bupa Europe&LatinAmerica

== Healthcare and biotech ==
- Jonny Mason (MBA), chief executive officer of Convatec since November 2025.
- Pascale Witz (MBA), former executive vice president of Sanofi and former president and CEO of the medical diagnostics business at GE Healthcare.
- Sophie Cahen (MBA), co-founder and former CEO of Ganymed Robotics, a French surgical robotics company.
- Prabhdeep Singh (MBA), founder and CEO of RED.Health, an Indian emergency medical response company.

== Energy and Mining ==
- Helge Lund (MBA 1991), Chairmand of BP, Chairman of Novo Nordisk
- Jessica Uhl (MBA 1997), President of GE Power, Former CFO of Royal Dutch Shell.
- Roustam Tariko (MBA 2000), billionaire Founder & President of Russian Standard Corporation.
- François Perrodo, chairman of Perenco, a family-owned international oil and gas company; Forbes estimated the combined wealth of his mother, Carrie Perrodo, and family at US$12.8 billion as of 31 October 2026.
- Satoshi Koyama (MBA 2003), CEO of Mineral Resources Group of Mitsubishi Corporation.
- Marius Kloppers (MBA), Former CEO of BHP (2007–2013).
- Jérôme Tolot (MBA), Executive Vice President (Deputy CEO) of Engie
- Francesco Caio (MBA), CEO and Chairman of Saipem, CEO of Poste Italiane (2014-2017)
- Noel Aoun (MBA), Chief Strategy Officer, TAQA
- Nabil Almessabi (Executive MBA), Chief Corporate Officer of TAQA
- Stanley Huang Tian Guan, (IEP 2008), CEO of Singapore Power Group
- Sam Laidlaw (MBA), Former CEO of Centrica
- Bernard Pinatel (MBA) Member of Management Committee and President Downstream and President Marketing & Services, TotalEnergies
- Cedrik Neike (MBA) Member of the Managing Board of Siemens AG and CEO Siemens Digital Industries
- Ernestina Benedetto (MBA), EVP Strategy and Transformation, Member of Executive Board at Varo Energy
- Christoph Brand (AMP), CEO Axpo Group
- Josephine Wapakabulo (Executive MBA), Former CEO of Uganda National Oil Company (2016-2019)
- Mikkel Seidelin (Executive MBA), Chief Commercial Officer of Teekay
- Susan Lloyd-Hurwitz (MBA'94J), former Chief Executive Officer and Managing Director of Mirvac Group (2012–2023), non-executive director of Rio Tinto and Macquarie Group.

== Automotive and Transport ==
- Yasuhisa Fujita (MBA), President, Toyota Finance Corporation
- Robert Peugeot (MBA), Billionaire Vice Chairman of Stellantis
- Sébastien Jacquet (Executive MBA 2016), Chief Quality Officer at Stellantis
- Adam Chilinski (Executive MBA 2014), Chief Finance Officer of SAIC-GM, $20bn revenue JV between SAIC and General Motors
- Noel Tata (IEP), billionaire Chairman of Tata Trusts, which holds a 66% stake in Tata Sons, the parent company of the Tata Group.
- Heung-Soo Kim (MBA 2005), Executive Vice President and Head of the Global Strategy Office of Hyundai Motor Group
- Nicolas Maure (MBA), EVP, Renault Group
- Nicolas Wertans (MBA), Senior Vice President, Global Sales, Renault Group
- Jasmmine Wong (Tsinghua-INSEAD Executive MBA), Vice President, Mobility Abdul Latif Jameel/CEO Jameel Motors
- Yousef Hussein (MBA), Chief Commercial Officer Jameel Motors
- Dominique Signora (MBA), 5th CEO of Renault Samsung Motors
- Stephane Deblaise (MBA) 6th CEO of Renault Samsung Motors
- Rahil Ansari (MBA): Head of Volkswagen Group Taiwan

== Defense and Aerospace ==
- Jean-Loïc Galle (MBA 1991), COO and CPO Thales Group, former CEO of Thales Alenia Space
- Philippe Harache (MBA), Former Deputy CEO of Eurocopter/ Airbus Helicopters, largest helicopter manufacturer globally.
- John Holland-Kaye (MBA), CEO, Heathrow Airport Holdings (2014-2023)
- Dominik Asam (MBA), CFO of SAP, Former CFO Airbus
- Eva Berneke (MBA 1995), CEO of Eutelsat
- Tony Wood (MBA), former CEO Rolls-Royce Aerospace, former CEO of Meggitt, Board member of Airbus
- Khalid Al Kaf (Executive MBA), COO Yahsat
- Benoît Habert (MBA 1996), Deputy CEO of Dassault Group (2000-now)
- Michael Wee (Executive MBA), Group President of Asia Pacific, Parker Hannifin Corporation
- Philip Chen (IEP), former CEO of Cathay Pacific, CEO of Hong Kong Dragon Airlines
- Éric Labaye (MBA 1987), chairman of Eutelsat since August 2025 and former president of École Polytechnique and Institut Polytechnique de Paris.
- Stéphane Germain (MBA 1994), founder and CEO of GHGSat, a Canadian company monitoring greenhouse gas emissions using satellites.

== Chemical and other industrial ==
- Leopoldo del Pino (MBA), Spanish billionaire businessman, Ferrovial shareholder and former director; Forbes estimated his net worth at US$3 billion as of 31 October 2026.
- Jean-Pierre Berghmans, INSEAD MBA, CEO of Lhoist Group
- Michael Pragnell (MBA), founder and CEO, Syngenta (2000-2007), Former CEO of Zeneca Agrochemicals (1995-2000)
- Cees van Lede (MBA), former chairman and CEO, Akzo Nobel
- Mikael Staffas (MBA 1992), CEO Boliden (2018-current)
- Benoit Potier (AMP), CEO of Air Liquide
- Nicolas Changeur (MBA), CEO for services & solutions and chief marketing officer, member of executive committee, Aperam

== Corporate services ==
- Charles Alexander Portes (MBA), Founder of ESR Group
- Raj Singh (MBA), Managing Partner, JLL Spark
- Mark Read (MBA 1993), CEO of WPP
- Arthur Sadoun (MBA 1997), CEO of Publicis.
- Colin Dyer (MBA), former CEO of JLL
- Rui Bastos (MBA) Ernst & Young Global Risk Leader
- Josep M. Gascón, Generalitat of Catalonia, Business Ambassador

== Consumer goods and services ==
- Reinold Geiger (MBA 1976), Austrian billionaire and Chairman of L'Occitane en Provence
- Patrick Cescau (MBA), Former CEO of Unilever, Chairman of InterContinental Hotels Group.
- Antoine Arnault (MBA), billionaire CEO of Christian Dior SE.
- Lindsay Owen-Jones (MBA), Chairman of L'Oréal
- Adam Goldstein (MBA), Former CEO of Royal Caribbean International, President and COO of Royal Caribbean Group.
- Grégoire de Spoelberch (MBA), Board member of Anheuser-Busch InBev
- Niels B. Christiansen (MBA 1991), CEO of The Lego Group.
- Barbara Martin Coppola (MBA 2005), CEO of Decathlon
- Jan Derck van Karnebeek (MBA), CEO of FrieslandCampina
- Emma Adamo (MBA), Director of Associated British Foods.
- Eugene Willemsen (Executive MBA), Chief Executive Officer, Africa, Middle East, South Asia and International Beverages, PepsiCo
- Finn Rausing (MBA), billionaire Co-Owner of Tetra Laval.
- Roland Krueger (MBA 1998), CEO of Dyson
- Hubert Sagnières (MBA), former CEO of Essilor, Vice-chairman of EssilorLuxottica
- Andreas Jacobs (MBA), billionaire former Chairman of INSEAD, former Chairman of Dr. Oetker and Louis Dreyfus Company.
- Philip Houzé (MBA 1974), Former CEO of Monoprix (1982-2012), Chairman of executive board of Galeries Lafayette Group (current), Vice-Chairman Carrefour (current)
- John Rogers (MBA), Board member of Grab Holdings, Former CFO Sainsbury's (2010-2016), CFO of WPP
- Patrick Firmenich (MBA 1990), Vice Chair of DSM-Firmenich
- Charles Rolls (MBA), co-founder of Fever-Tree.
- Antonio M. Pérez (MBA), former CEO and Chairman of Eastman Kodak Company during its bankruptcy, known for "“What everyone should expect from Kodak is business as usual.”
- André Calantzopoulos (MBA), Chairman of Philip Morris International
- Philippe Schaus (MBA), CEO Moët Hennessy Chairman & CEO, DFS Group
- Dmitry Yevgenevich Strashnov (MBA 1999), General Director of the Russian Post from 2013 to 2017
- Melanie Kreis (MBA 2000), CFO of Deutsche Post.
- Mark A. Sarvary (MBA), Former President & CEO, Tempur Sealy International (2008-2015)
- Gerry Ford (businessman) (MBA), Founder of Caffe Nero.
- Mika Masuyama (MBA), Board member of Suntory Beverage & Food Ltd, Kokuyo Co., Ltd, Konoike Transport Co., Ltd
- Philippe Mellier (MBA 1980), CEO of De Beers (2011- 2016)
- Al Cook (IEP), CEO of De Beers (2023- now)
- Phil Bentley (MBA), CEO of Mitie.
- József Váradi (MBA), co-founder and CEO of Wizz Air.
- Veranita Yosephine Sinaga (MBA 2016), CEO Indonesia Air Asia
- Stephan DuCharme (MBA 1992) Chairman of Dia Supermarket
- Daniel Lalonde, Former CEO, SMCP Group
- Pierre Mauger (MBA), Chief Transformation Officer, Bunge
- Thomas Couteaudier (MBA), Chief Strategy Officer, Louis Dreyfus Company
- Sebastian James (MBA), CEO of Boots.
- Edward S. Mork, (MBA 1968) Former EVP and CEO Asia and Latin America Ahold NV, Former Board Member INSEAD, Former Board Member Firmenich

== Conglomerate and others ==
- Fernando Zobel de Ayala (IEP), billionaire CEO of Ayala Corporation
- Paul Desmarais, Jr. (MBA), Canadian Billionaire Chairman and Co-CEO of Power Corporation of Canada.
- Paul Desmarais III (MBA), Canadian Billionaire Chairman of Sagard, Businessman
- Ben Keswick (MBA), Executive Chairman of Jardine Matheson.
- Carolyn Fairbairn (MBA), Former Director-General of Confederation of British Industry
- Dag J. Opedal (MBA 1987), Former CEO of Orkla Group.

== Technology ==
=== Fintech ===
- Christopher Harborne (MBA 1988), British billionaire businessman and investor with interests in aviation, cryptocurrency and financial services, including Tether, QinetiQ and IFX Payments; ranked sixth in the 2026 Sunday Times Rich List, with an estimated fortune of £18.2 billion.
- Taavet Hinrikus (MBA 2010), Billionaire Co-founder of unicorn payment company Wise
- Edward Wible (MBA 2012), co-founder and CTO of decacorn Nubank
- Livia Martines Chanes (MBA), CEO Brazil, Nubank
- Hong Min-taek / Max Hong (MBA), former CEO of Toss Bank, CPO of KakaoTalk.
- Yashish Dahiya (MBA 2001), Founder and CEO of Policybazaar.
- Luis Basagoiti Marqués (MBA 2020), Founder and CEO, Capchase
- Pierre-François Thaler (MBA 1999), co-founder and CEO, sustainability finance unicorn Ecovadis
- Sergio Fogel (MBA 1994), Uruguayan Billionaire Co-founder of unicorn dLocal
- Jeff Goldstein, President, PriceGrabber
- Steve Anavi (MBA 2011) Co-founder and President of unicorn Qonto
- Alexandre Prot (MBA 2011), co-founder and CEO of unicorn Qonto
- Giles Andrews (MBA 1997), Founder and CEO of unicorn neobank Zopa
- Cameron Stevens (MBA 2006), Founder and CEO of Prodigy Finance, which started as class project at INSEAD
- Chen Amit (MBA 1994), Founder and CEO of accounting unicorn Tipalti
- Niall Wass (MBA), COO at Wonga.com

=== Logistics Tech and E-commerce ===
- Paulo Veras (MBA 2001), Founder and CEO of 99, first unicorn in Brazil, acquired by DiDi
- Ming Zeng (Assistant Professor), Chief Strategy Officer, Alibaba Group (2008-now)
- Chen Weiru (Assistant Professor 2003-2011), Chief Strategy Officer, Cainiao (2017-2020)
- Barney Harford (MBA), Board member of United Airlines, former COO, Uber, former CEO Orbitz.
- Vikram Rupani (MBA), Founder and CEO of Nuguru, co-founder of RedMart, acquired by Alibaba Group.
- Frédéric Mazzella (MBA 2011), co-founder and chairman, BlaBlaCar
- Nicolas Brusson (MBA 2011), co-founder and CEO, BlaBlaCar
- Julien Belliato (MBA 2016), co-founder and COO, Electra (EV charging company)
- Sukru Dagdelen (MBA), co-founder and Chief Strategy Officer, Gorillas
- Sandeep Varaganti (MBA 2010), CEO JioMart
- David Nothacker (MBA 2015), Founder and CEO of unicorn Sennder, which started as a class project at INSEAD
- Jaydeep Barman (MBA 2006), Founder and CEO of Rebel Foods
- San Kim (MBA 2014), Founder and CEO of Swing Mobility, Korea and Japan
- Karl Gao (Executive MBA), Chief Compliance Officer and Global General Counsel, Nio (electric car)

=== Media and social network ===
- Bob van Dijk (MBA), CEO, Naspers
- Gary Wang (MBA 2005), Founder and Former CEO Tudou, Founder Light Chaser Animation Studios
- Dominic Gallello (MBA) Former CMO of Bumble
- Natalia Vodianova (IEP) Russian model and co-founder of Locals.org
- Erik Wachtmeister (MBA), Founder, aSmallWorld
- Aloke Bajpai (MBA 2005), Founder and CEO, unicorn Ixigo

=== Tech infrastructure and Telecom ===
- Börje Ekholm (MBA 1988), CEO of Ericsson.
- Jayesh Ramesh Patel (MBA 1997, Dean’s list), CEO of Imimobile and latterly SVP, Cisco
- Alexander Izosimov (MBA), Former CEO of Vimpelcom
- Nishant Batra (MBA), Chief Strategy and Technology Officer, Nokia
- David A. Romna (Executive MBA), Chief Marketing Officer of Lenovo
- André Almeida (MBA), Head of Investment and Portfolio Management of Deutsche Telekom, Board member T-Mobile
- Henrik Clausen (MBA), Chairman of TDC Net, former CEO of Bang & Olufsen
- R. Adam Norwitt (MBA), CEO of Amphenol
- Leane Woods (MBA), Chief HR Officer and Member of Executive Committee, Vodafone
- Kevin P. Ryan (MBA 1991), Co-founder & Former CEO, DoubleClick, CEO, Gilt Groupe, Founder of MongoDB, Founder of Business Insider, Board member of Human Rights Watch
- Samir Arora, CEO & Chairman, NetObjects
- Dominique Trempont (MBA), CFO, NeXT Computer
- Suresh Sidhu (MBA 1997), co-founder and the chief executive officer of EdgePoint, ASEAN telecom infrastructure company

=== Edtech ===
- Bin Yu (Executive MBA), CFO of Edtech unicorn Lingochamp

=== Tech investment and Other ===
- Geoff Ralston (MBA 1992), Former President, Y Combinator, Founder of RocketMail, which later becomes Yahoo!Mail,
- Oren Zeev (MBA 1994), Israeli-American Billionaire Venture Capitalist
- Stephane Kurgan (MBA), Partner Index Ventures, Former COO, King.com, makers of Candy Crush
- Mark Pathy (MBA), Chairman of Stingray Group, astronaut.
- Yves-Michel Marti (MBA), Pioneer in Competitive Intelligence
- José Luis Cordeiro, Author, Futurist and Transhumanist
- George Bachiashvili, Businessman in Georgia, currently imprisoned under charges widely considered dubious

== Heads of state/government ==
- Johann Schneider-Ammann (MBA 1977), President of Switzerland (2016-2018), member of the Federal Council (Switzerland), Head of the Department of Economic Affairs, Education and Research (2010-2018).
- Najib Mikati (AMP 1980), Prime Minister of Lebanon and billionaire founder of Investcom (2005-2005; 2011-2014; 2021-2025).
- Luís Montenegro (AMP), Portuguese politician and Prime Minister of Portugal (2024–now).
- Jusuf Kalla (MBA 1977), Former Vice President of Indonesia (2004-2009 & 2014-2019).
- Mamuka Bakhtadze (MBA 2010), Prime Minister of Georgia.
- Wopke Hoekstra (MBA 2005), EU Commissioner for Climate Change, Former First Deputy Prime Minister of the Netherlands.
- Karien van Gennip (MBA), Former Second Deputy Prime Minister of the Netherlands, Dutch Minister of Social Affairs (2022-2024), Former CEO of ING France.

== Ministers and Members of Cabinet ==
- William Hague (MBA 1986), Former Leader of Conservative Party (UK), Former First Secretary of State and Secretary of State for Foreign & Commonwealth Affairs of the UK.
- Bill Morneau (MBA 1990), Former Finance Minister, Government of Canada.
- Tidjane Thiam (MBA 1988), former Minister of Planning and Development of Ivory Coast (1998-1999, ousted by a coup d'état ), former CEO of Credit Suisse and Prudential.
- Emilie Enger Mehl (MBA), former Norwegian Minister of Justice.
- Notis Mitarachi (MBA 2003) – Greek politician; Greek Minister of Migration and Asylum (15 January 2020 – 26 May 2023) and Minister of Citizen Protection (27 June 2023 – 28 July 2023).
- Pedro Reis (AMP 1995), Portuguese politician and Minister of Economy (2024–now).
- Beata Stelmach (MBA), Polish Undersecretary of State in the Ministry of Foreign Affairs
- Lord Simon of Highbury (MBA 1966), British politician and Minister for Trade and Competitiveness in Europe.
- Joe Issa El-Khoury (MBA), Lebanese Minister of Industry (2025–present).
- Karsten Wildberger (MBA), German Federal Minister for Digital Transformation and Government Modernisation (since 2025).
- Yuriy Vitrenko (MBA), Ukrainian Acting Minister of Energy (2020–2021).
- Ralava Beboarimisa (IEP), Malagasy Minister of Environment, Ecology, Sea and Forests (2015–2016) and Minister of Transport and Meteorology (2017–2019).
- Alfonso López Caballero (MBA), Colombian Minister of Agriculture and Minister of Interior.
- Alfredo E. Pascual (IEP), Filippino Secretary of the Department of Trade and Industry.
- Lee Yock Suan (AMP 1979), Ministers of State (1981-1985), Labor (1985-1992), Education (1992-1997), Trade and Industry/Finance (1997-1999), in charge of Prime Minister's Office (2001-2004) of Singapore
- Christopher Hui (MBA 2003), Secretary for Financial Services and the Treasury, Hong Kong.
- Perry Lim (MBA 2008), Former Chief of Defence Force (Singapore).
- Conor Lenihan (MBA 1997), Former Irish Minister of State.
- Jo Johnson (MBA 2000), Former Minister of State, Member of Parliament Conservative Party (UK)
- Yoav Kisch, MBA, Former Israeli Minister of Education and Regional Cooperation
- Eric Wiebes (MBA 1991), Dutch Minister of Economic Affairs and Climate Policy (2017–2021)
- Muriel Penicaud (AMP 1995), Former Deputy CEO of Dassault Systèmes, French Minister of Labor (2017–2020)
- Arnaud Montebourg, (IEP 2014), Former French Minister of Economy, Industrial Renewal, and Digital Affairs
- Seamus O'Regan (N/A), Former Canadian Minister of Veterans Affairs.
- Chris Liebenberg (AMP), Former Minister for Finance of South Africa

== Members of Legislation ==
- Karl von Wogau (MBA 1970), Member of European Parliament
- Bill Newton Dunn (MBA 1966), Member of the European Parliament (MEP) from 1979 to 1994, 1999 to 2014 and again from 2019 until the UK's withdrawal from the EU in 2020.
- Wolf Klinz (MBA 1966), Member of the European Parliament
- Tomoaki Shimada (MSc 2002; PhD 2005), Member of the House of Representatives (2024-now), Parliamentary Vice-Minister for Foreign Affairs of Japan, former Mayor of Kawachinagano City, Osaka Prefecture
- Sam Rainsy (MBA 1979), Member of Parliament of Cambodia.
- Tioulong Saumura (MBA 1974), Member of Parliament of Cambodia.
- Elena Panaritis, Member of Greek parliament
- Oleksii Poroshenko (MBA 1992), People's Deputy of Ukraine (Member of parliament)
- Einat Wilf (MBA) Israeli Former Member of Knesset and Zionist
- Arvind Bellad (MBA) Member of Legislative Assembly of Karnataka, India
- Rachel Ong (Tsinghua - INSEAD Executive MBA), Member of Parliament of Singapore
- Andre Low (MBA), Member of Parliament of Singapore.
- Luiz Philippe of Orléans-Braganza (MBA 1997), Federal Deputy (member of lower chamber of Brazilian National Congress) for São Paulo, CFO of Truth Social
- Panagiotis (Notis) Mitarachi (MBA 2003), MP of Hellenic Parliament, former minister.
- Terence Ho Wai Luen (MBA), Nominated Member of Parliament of Singapore.

== Judges of Supreme Courts ==
- Lee Seiu Kin (MBA 1983), a Senior Judge of the Supreme Court of Singapore.

== Royal and religious leaders ==
- Prince Jean of Luxembourg (MBA 1986)
- Prince Friso of Orange-Nassau (MBA 1997)
- Prince Constantijn of the Netherlands (MBA 2000)
- Count Leo-Ferdinand Henckel von Donnersmarck (MBA), President of the German Association of the Sovereign Military Order of Malta
- Miguel Pais do Amaral (MBA), Portuguese Aristocrat and Entrepreneur
- Jan Dobrzenský z Dobrzenicz (MBA 1983), Grand Master of the Orléans obedience of the Order of Saint Lazarus from 2010 to 2023

== Central bankers ==
- Denis Beau (MBA), First Deputy Governor of the Banque de France.
- Andrew Large (MBA '70), Deputy Governor for Financial Stability at the Bank of England (2002–2006).
- Sam Woods (MBA), Deputy Governor of the Bank of England
- Abdulaziz Abanmi (Executive Program), Deputy Governor for Payments at the Saudi Central Bank (SAMA).
- Karen Silk (AMP), Assistant Governor and General Manager of Economics, Financial Markets, and Banking at the Reserve Bank of New Zealand.
- Mhlabuhlangene Dlamini (N/A), Deputy Governor of the Central Bank of Eswatini.

== Other politicians ==
- Jussi Pajunen (MBA), Mayor of Helsinki
- David Jaworsky (IDP), Mayor of Waterloo from 2014 to 2022
- Jacqueline Poh (MBA 2008), Managing Director of Economic Development Board of Singapore
- Leila Hoteit (MBA), Human Capital Specialist, Senior Partner of Boston Consulting Group
- Wendy Alexander (MBA), Scottish Politician
- Arihia Bennett, New Zealand Māori Leader
- Nick Anstee, Former Lord Mayor of the City of London
- Sadia Khan (MBA 1995), Former Commissioner of the Securities & Exchange Commission of Pakistan

== Non-profit ==
- Patricia Moreira (MBA), former Managing Director of Transparency International
- Will Hutton (MBA), Former Principal, Hertford College, Oxford
- Jan Jananayagam (MBA 1999), co-founder, Tamils Against Genocide.
- Karen Hitschke (MBA 1997), CEO of Building Bridges, Former COO of WHO Foundation
- Ayhan Kose (Visiting Professor), Deputy Chief Economist of the World Bank Group
- Jonathan Coony (MBA), Global Lead for Green Competitiveness, Finance, Competitiveness & Innovation, World Bank Group
- Joseph Comerford (MBA), a founder of INDEAVOR Club at INSEAD, UN humanitarian expert killed in action during Great Lakes Refugee Crisis
- Tariq Fancy, Founder, The Rumie Initiative
- Stephen Cutts (Executive MBA), CEO, Medical Aid for Palestinians
- Nabila Aguele (MBA 2014), CEO of Malala Fund since April 2026 and former special adviser to Nigeria’s Minister of Finance, Budget and National Planning.

== Media ==
- Ryoichi Ueda (MBA 1995), Chairman of NHK, former president and CEO of Mitsubishi Corporation
- Peter Job (MBA), Former CEO, Reuters (1991-2001)
- Birger Magnus (MBA), Board member Harvard Business Publishing, Former Deputy CEO of Schibsted
- Marinella Soldi (MBA 1994), Chairwoman of RAI – Radiotelevisione italiana
- Shinichiro Ishikawa (MBA 1995), Founder and CEO, Gonzo
- Tom Ryan (MBA), CEO and president of Paramount Streaming and founder of Pluto TV.
- Mika Salmi (MBA 1992), Former President of Global Media at MTV
- Helen Alexander (MBA 1984), former CEO of The Economist Group (1997-2008), first female President of Confederation of British Industry, former Chancellor of the University of Southampton (2011–2017)
- Alan Chan (MBA 1983), former CEO of the Singapore Press Holdings (2003-2017).
- Lucy Chen (MBA), Chief Data and Strategy of South China Morning Post (SCMP)
- Virginie Calmels (AMP) chief executive officer (CEO) of Canal+ and Endemol.
- Peter Tonagh (MBA), Deputy Chair, Australian Broadcasting Corporation
- Peter Fudakowski (MBA), 2006 Academy Award Winner for Best Foreign Film.
- Erin Meyer (MBA), Affiliate Professor at INSEAD and Co-author of No Rules Rules: Netflix and the Culture of Reinvention
- Kelvin Teo, Winner of Reality Show Love Me Do Season 1.
- Julie Meyer, TV personality on Dragons' Den.
- Gunnar Dedio, Founder and CEO, LOOKSfilm.
- Anthony Pangilinan (MBA), Filipino radio and television host and businessman
- Bernice Liu, Canadian actress, singer, model.
- Raymond Khoury, Lebanese Author.
- Walter Kohl, German Businessman and Author.
- Roopak Saluja, Indian Media Entrepreneur.
- Jan Mojto (MBA), film producer.
- Patrick Mork (MBA 2000J), Motivational Speaker, Co-creator Google play, Podcast Host: Mork Unfiltered, Author of Step Back and LEAP, Pocketgamer Hall of Fame inductee

== Sports ==
- Sypros Capralos (MBA 1979), 1980 and 1984 Summer Olympics polo contestant, President of Hellenic Olympic Committee, member of the International Olympic Committee (IOC).
- Cristina Teuscher (MBA), 1996 Summer Olympics, Swimming Gold Medalist, Former Head Coach for Yale Women Swimming
- Andy Anson (MBA), CEO, British Olympic Association
