= Russian Standard =

Russian Standard (Russian: Русский Стандарт) may refer to:

- Russian Standard Corporation, a Russian holding company which owns:
  - Russian Standard Company, a Russian company which produces
    - Russian Standard Vodka, a Russian vodka
  - Russian Standard Bank, a Russian bank
  - Russian Standard Insurance, a Russian insurance company
