= Harache =

Harache may refer to:

- Harache family, a family of goldsmiths of Huguenot extraction
- Philippe Harache (1954-?), former deputy CEO of Eurocopter
