= Russian University of Transport =

Higher education institution

- Российский университет транспорта
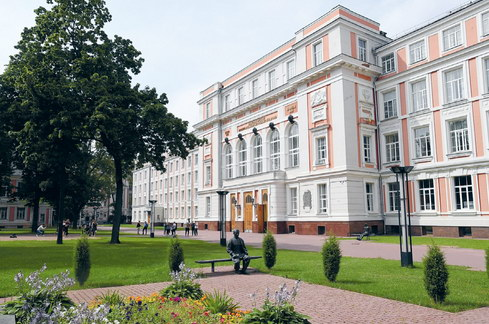
- Former names: Moscow State University of Railway Engineering
- Motto: Мы создаем движение!
- Motto in English: "We create movement!"
- Type: Public
- Established: 1896
- President: Boris Levin
- Rector: Alexander Klimov
- Academic staff: over 1400
- Students: 93,000
- Location: Moscow, Russia; 55°47′16″N 37°36′29″E
- Campus: Urban
- Colours: Blue
- Website: rut-miit.ru
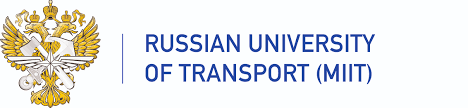

University rankings

Regional – Overall
- QS Emerging Europe and Central Asia: 351-400 (2022)

The Russian University of Transport (MIIT; Russian: «Российский университет транспорта»), officially the Autonomous Educational Institution of Higher Education "Russian University of Transport" (Russian: Федеральное государственное автономное образовательное учреждение высшего образования "Российский университет транспорта") is a public university founded in 1896 and headquartered in Moscow, Russia. Along with its main campus located in the capital, the university maintains one other regional campus in Sochi.

RUT is a leading transport educational institution and hosts the biggest university complex in Moscow, Russia. RUT is under the governance of the Ministry of Transport of the Russian Federation.

== History ==
Russian University of Transport was established as the Imperial Moscow Engineering School (IMIU) by decree of Emperor Nicholas II on May 23, 1896, in order to train engineers for the construction of the Trans-Siberian Railway. Training courses began on 12 September 1896. The first director of the university was professor F.E. Maksimenko. The first course of engineers graduated in 1901 (three-years theoretical course and two-years building practice). The Russian University of Transport is the oldest institution of higher technical education in Russia founded in 1896. Today TUT is the largest scientific and academic complex in Russia, the all Russian leader in the field of training and retraining of specialists and scientific personnel for transport and transport construction. On 15 June 1993, MIIT got the status of the university and its name was changed to the Moscow State University of Railway Engineering.

For more than 120 years of history, more than 650 thousand highly qualified specialists with higher and secondary professional education have left the university. They successfully work in transport and in other various sectors of the economy in Russia and 57 countries of the world. More than 30 Heroes of the Soviet Union and Socialist Labor, transport industry leaders, world-famous scientists, members of the Russian government, governors, mayors of large cities, prominent public figures, prominent representatives of the Russian Orthodox Church and culture, and top businessmen are among the graduates of RUT.

In Soviet times, the university was notable for being one of just a few institutions in the upper echelon that did not participate in the state-directed antisemitism campaign in higher education. This gave many Jewish students in the USSR a chance at a higher education when they would not have otherwise gotten it.

== Structure of the university ==
Institutes:

- Institute of Transport Engineering and Operation Systems
- Institute of Railway Track, Construction and Structures
- Institute of Operation and Digital Technologies
- Institute of Economics and Finance
- Institute of International Transport Communications
- Law Institute

Academies:

- Basic Training Academy
- Academy of Water Transport
- Russian Academy of Railway Engineering
- Russian Open Transport Academy

Research Institute:

- Scientific Research Institute of Transport and Transport Construction

Branches and representative offices:

- Sochi Institute of Transport - branch of the federal state autonomous educational institution of higher education "Russian University of Transport", Sochi branch of RUT (MIIT)

Colleges and technical schools:

- Gymnasium
- College of the Academy of Water Transport
- Medical College
- Moscow College of Transport,
- Law College of the Law Institute

== Notable alumni ==
- Semyon Belits-Geiman, Soviet Olympic swimmer
- Bidzina Ivanishvili, Georgian businessman and politician
- Vitaly Malkin, Russian businessman and politician
- Konstantin Borovoi, Russian businessman and politician
- Igor Guberman, Russian-Israeli poet
- Anatoly Rybakov, Soviet and Russian writer
- Roustam Tariko, Russian businessman
- Yakov Dzhugashvili, son of Joseph Stalin
- Igor Zaitsev, Soviet Grandmaster
- Gregory Kaidanov, Russian-American Grandmaster
- Viktor Vekselberg, Russian businessman
- Len Blavatnik, Russian-American businessman
- Vladimir Kuzmin, Russian musician
- Victor Cherkashin, Longtime KGB officer in America, handler for Ames and Hanssen
- Alexander Maslyakov, Russian television personality, founder of KVN
- Isidore Mvouba
- Fu Zhihuan
- Yaakov Kedmi
