= Igor Guberman =

Israeli writer and poet

Igor Mironovich Guberman
- Игорь Миронович Губерман
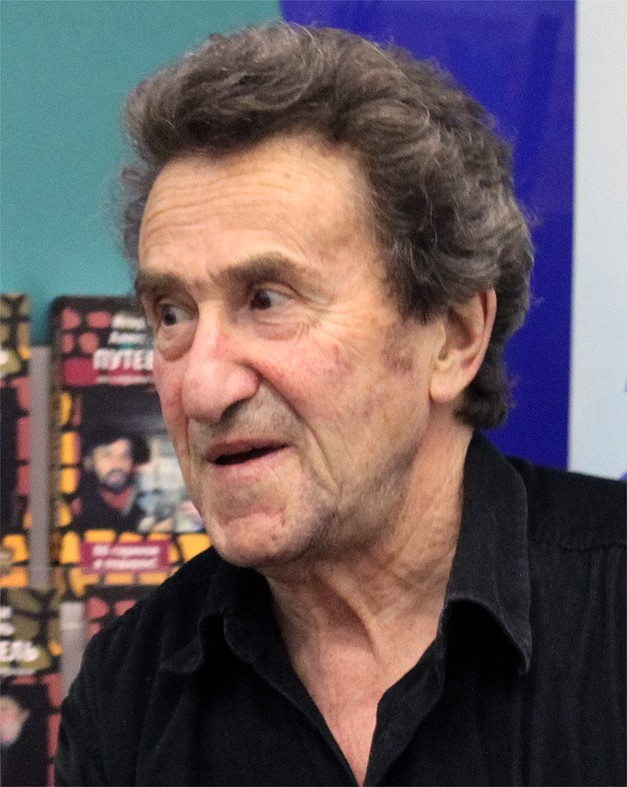
- Guberman in 2009
- Born: July 7, 1936 (age 90); Kharkiv, Ukrainian SSR
- Education: Moscow State University of Railway Engineering
- Occupations: poetry, literature

Igor Mironovich Guberman (Russian: И́горь Миро́нович Губерма́н, IPA: [ˈiɡərʲ mʲɪˈronəvʲɪtɕ ɡʊbʲɪrˈman], born July 7, 1936) is a Jewish Ukrainian writer and poet who lives in Israel since 1988. His poetry has received a great deal of acclaim primarily because of his signature aphoristic and satiric quatrains that he called gariki in Russian (singular: garik, which is also the diminutive form of the author's first name, Igor). These short poems (originally Guberman called them "Jewish [[Big-character poster|Dazibao]]") usually feature an ABAB rhyme scheme, employ various poetic meters, and cover a wide range of subjects including antisemitism, immigrant life, anti-religious sentiment, and the author's complicated relationship with Russia, Israel, and the respective cultures. Gariki are mostly humorous and often paradoxical, verging on philosophical.

== Biography ==
Igor Guberman was born in Kharkiv on July 7, 1936. After high school, he entered the Moscow State University of Railway Engineering. In 1958, he graduated with a degree in electrical engineering. He worked as an electrical engineer for several years and wrote on the side in his spare time. Toward the end of the 1950s, he was introduced to Alexander Ginzburg, who published Syntax, one of the first samizdat periodicals, as well as to other underground philosophers, writers, and artists. For some time he worked as a secretary to the great Russian poet David Samoylov, and also as a ghostwriter for hire.

At first, Guberman wrote popular science books (such as "Third Triumvirate"), but he gradually became more and more active as a dissident poet. Guberman published his underground work under the pseudonyms I. Mironov and Abram Khayyam, connecting the names of the famous Persian poet Omar Khayyám and the Jewish first name Abram.

In 1979, Guberman was arrested and sentenced based on fabricated charges to five years in the Soviet labor colonies. He based his book, Walks Around the Barracks (written in 1980, published in 1988), on the diaries he kept during this time.

In 1984, Guberman returned from Siberia. For a long time, he could get neither a job nor a residence permit (Propiska) to live in Moscow. In 1987, he emigrated from the USSR to Israel, and since 1988 he has been living in Jerusalem. He visits Russia quite frequently to attend poetry readings. Books by Guberman have sold hundreds of thousands of copies in Russia and in countries with Russian immigrant communities, with whom they are always popular.

== Quatrains ==
Examples of Guberman's quatrains:

Возглавляя партии и классы,
Лидеры вовек не брали в толк,
Что идея, брошенная в массы,
Это – девка, брошенная в полк.

Translation:

Those fervid leaders of parties and classes
Have to this detail ignorance displayed
That an idea thrown before the masses
Is like a harlot thrown to a brigade.

Мне жаль небосвод этот синий,
Жаль землю и неба осколки
Мне страшно, что сытые свиньи
Страшней, чем голодные волки.

Translation:

I’m sorry for the stars above that shine,
And sorry for the Earth beneath our feet
It’s scary that satiated pigs and swine
Are scarier than wild wolves who need to eat.

Не прыгай с веком наравне,
Будь человеком.
Не то окажешься в говне
Совместно с веком.

Translation:

Don't race to keep up with the century,
Stay a human being.
Or else you'll find yourself in deep shit
Together with that century.
