= Miguel Amaral =

Portuguese businessman (born 1954)

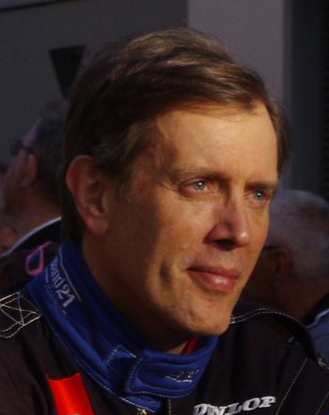
- Amaral in 2011

Count of Alferrarede
- Full name: Miguel Maria de Sá Pais do Amaral
- Born: 31 July 1954 (age 72); Lisbon
- Spouse: Maria da Luz Lagos do Amaral Cabral
- Father: Manuel José Maria de Sá Pais do Amaral

Miguel Amaral
24 Hours of Le Mans career
- Years: 2006 – 2011
- Teams: Quifel ASM Team
- Best finish: 20th (2008, 2010)
- Class wins: 0

Miguel Maria de Sá Pais do Amaral, 8th Count of Anadia, 4th Count of Alferrarede, KHDSMOM, commonly known as Miguel Amaral (born 31 July 1954) is a Portuguese aristocrat, businessman and amateur racing driver.

== Family ==
Miguel Amaral, born in Lisbon, Portugal, is the only child of Manuel José Maria de Sá Pais do Amaral, 7th Count of Anadia and Dona Maria Mafalda de Figueiredo Cabral da Câmara, of the Counts of Belmonte.

He married Maria da Luz Lagos do Amaral Cabral at Estoril on 5 November 1983. Maria was the daughter of Joaquim Emílio do Amaral Cabral, a lawyer, and Maria Elisabeth da Silva Lagos. Maria and Miguel had two daughters: Maria da Assunção de Sá Pais do Amaral, born at São Domingos de Benfica, Lisbon, on 29 December 1987, and Carolina Rita de Sá Pais do Amaral, born at São Domingos de Benfica, Lisbon, on 23 January 1991. The couple separated in 2010.

== Career ==
=== Personal career ===
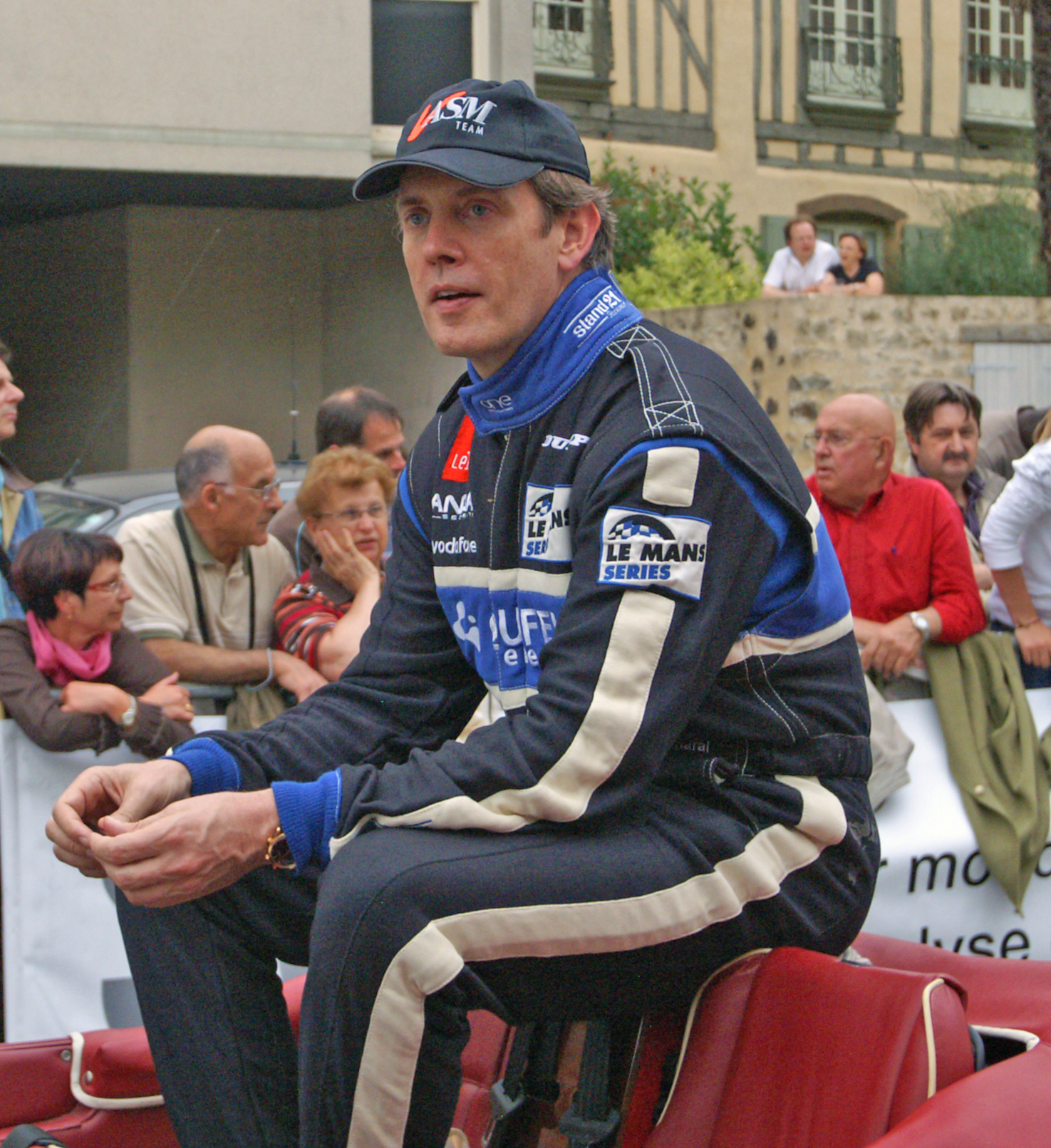
The Count of Alferrarede.

A mechanical engineer graduate with an MBA from INSEAD, Amaral was the former majority owner of the Media Capital group, a conglomerate that owns the TVI TV channel and several radio stations, including Rádio Comercial and Rádio Clube Português in Portugal. He sold a majority stake in the group to PRISA in 2005.

His current business interests are concentrated in Quifel Group, via 3 sub-holdings: a) Quifel Natural Resources; b) AHS Investimentos; c) Partgris. Through these investment vehicles, Miguel Pais do Amaral has relevant stakes in companies such as Norwind, Campo Largo Patrimonial, Novabase, Casa da Anadia and others. The majority of his investments are concentrated in Portugal and Brazil, in renewable energy and property markets.

=== Racing career ===
Amaral began racing in the Portuguese Cross-Country Rally Championship, as well as in the Portuguese Classic Touring Car Championship. In 2001, he teamed up with Pedro Couceiro to drive in the Spanish GT Championship before the two joined ASM Team Later, he teamed up with Miguel de Castro driving a Porsche 997 GT3 RSR and in 2009 he won the Trofeu Iberico de GT.

In 2006. Amaral purchased a Lola B05/40 Le Mans prototype, formerly run by Chamberlain-Synergy Motorsports in the Le Mans Series. After one win under the Chamberlain name, the team scored two more victories as ASM, but this prevented Amaral and his co-drivers Miguel Angel de Castro and Angel Burgueño from winning their class. Amaral and ASM Team continued to run their Lola in the Le Mans Series in 2007 and 2008. In 2009, Amaral and Olivier Pla raced a Ginetta-Zytek GZ09S/2 and won the LMP2 championship.

== 24 Hours of Le Mans results ==
Year	Team	Co-Drivers	Car	Class	Laps	Pos.	Class Pos.
2006	(United Kingdom) Chamberlain-Synergy Motorsport; ASM Team Racing for Portugal	(United Kingdom) Warren Hughes (Spain) Miguel Ángel de Castro	Lola B05/40-AER	LMP2	196	DNF	DNF
2007	Quifel ASM Team Racing for Portugal	(United Kingdom) Warren Hughes (Spain) Miguel Ángel de Castro	Lola B05/40-AER	LMP2	137	DNF	DNF
2008	(Portugal) Quifel ASM Team	(France) Olivier Pla (United Kingdom) Guy Smith	Lola B05/40-AER	LMP2	325	20th	4th
2009	(Portugal) Quifel ASM Team	(France) Olivier Pla (United Kingdom) Guy Smith	Ginetta-Zytek GZ09S/2	LMP2	46	DNF	DNF
2010	(Portugal) Quifel ASM Team	(France) Olivier Pla (United Kingdom) Warren Hughes	Ginetta-Zytek GZ09S/2	LMP2	318	20th	7th
2011	(Portugal) Quifel ASM Team	(France) Olivier Pla (United Kingdom) Warren Hughes	Zytek 09SC	LMP1	48	DNF	DNF

Sporting positions
Preceded by Jos Verstappen	Le Mans Series LMP2 Champion; 2009 with: Olivier Pla	Succeeded by Thomas Erdos; Mike Newton
