= Lucy Quist =

Ghanaian-British business and technology executive

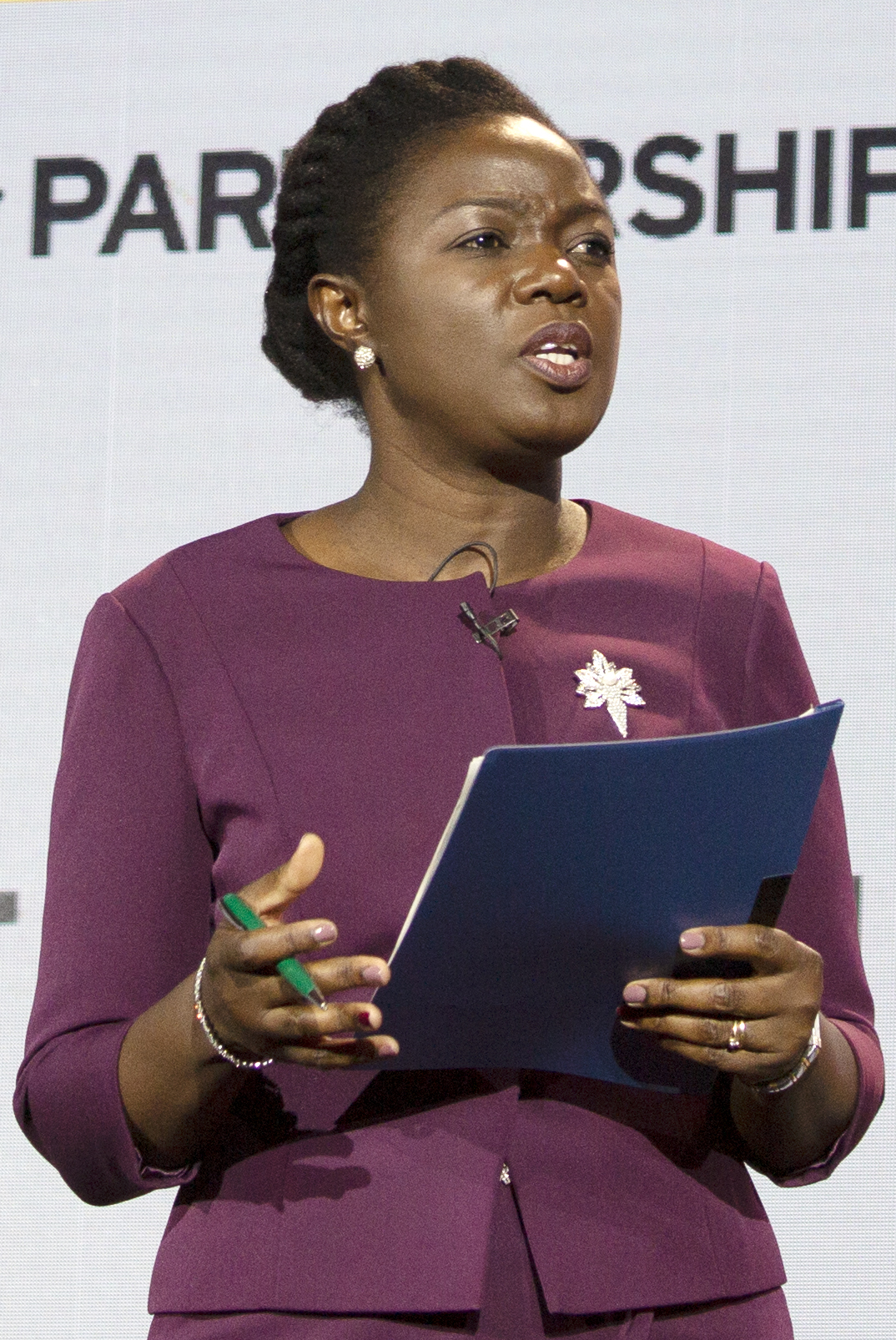
- Quist at the UK-Africa Investment Summit in London in 2020
- Born: Lucy Afriyie; 1974 (age 51–52); London, United Kingdom
- Education: University of East London; INSEAD
- Occupations: Business executive; Electrical engineer
- Known for: First Ghanaian woman CEO in telecommunications industry
- Website: https://lucyquist.com/

Lucy Quist, née Afriyie, (born c. 1974) is a Ghanaian-British business and technology executive. She is a former managing director for Morgan Stanley. She is currently a managing director and Head of Transformation at Barclays Corporate Banking.

== Early life and education ==
Born in London to Ghanaian parents, Peter and Mary Afriyie, Lucy Quist spent her formative years in both Europe and Africa. She went to Wesley Girls' High School in Cape Coast and attended sixth-form college at the Presbyterian Boys' Senior High School. She went on to study at the University of East London and graduated with a first-class honours degree in Electrical and Electronic Engineering. She holds an MBA from INSEAD in France.

== Career ==
In her early working life, she was an Electrical and Electronic Engineer at Ford Motor Company, and attained her Chartered Engineer certification. She joined the Royal Bank of Scotland as a change manager before switching to the telecommunications industry in 2008 at Millicom International Cellular, working in business development, sales, distribution, and marketing. Lucy Quist was appointed Head of Strategy and Planning at Vodafone's Ghanaian subsidiary. In addition, she oversaw the company's wholesale and enterprise businesses. She served as the CEO of Airtel Ghana and in 2017, she moved on after serving for three and half years. In her leadership role, she advocated for greater youth STEM participation in Ghana through her company's corporate social responsibility initiative. She founded Quist Blue Diamond. She also co-founded FreshPay payment platform in the Democratic Republic of Congo and the Executive Women Network. In September 2018, she was appointed by FIFA as their Vice President of the Normalization Committee to restructure football in Ghana. She is currently a Managing Director at Morgan Stanley in its London office. She has also been engaged on the public speaking circuit at events such as the Mobile World Congress, Hogan Lovells African Forum 2017, Pan African Women Forum, TEDxEuston, Wharton Africa Business Forum, the Sanford C. Bernstein Center for Leadership and Ethics Conference at Columbia Business School and the African Development Investment Convention.

== Boards and directorships ==
Quist serves on several international and local boards of organisations including the:

- International Board for African Institute for Mathematical Sciences (AIMS)
- Chair, Petra (Pension) Trust Company Ltd.
- Obaatan Pa Women's Hospital
- Business Environment Enabling Programme under the UK Department of International Development (DFID)
- Business Sounding Board for the Danish Embassy in Accra
- Industry Advisory Board for Ashesi University
- The Exploratory – An initiative of the African Women Advocacy Project
- Ghana Climate innovation centre
- Women in Business Initiative
- Africa CEO Forum
- Consolidated Bank of Ghana
- International Board of MercyShips
- Board of INSEAD
- Board of Club Brugge KV

== Works ==
- The Bold New Normal: Creating The Africa Where Everyone Prospers (2019)

== Awards and honours ==
Quist has received the following awards:

Year	Nominee / work	Award	Result
2015	Marketing Woman of the Year	CIMG	Won
2015	Special Recognition to the Telecom Industry		Won
2015	CSR CEO of the Year	Ghana CSR Excellence Awards	Won
2016	8th Most Influential Public Figure	Ghana Social Media Rankings	Won
2016	Telecom CEO of the Year	GITTA Awards	Won
2016	Excellence in Corporate Responsibility	Ghana Women of the Year Honours	Won
2016	58th Most Influential Person in Ghana	Ghana's Most Influential Awards	Won
2016	Power Women	BBC	Won
2017	Corporate Leadership Award	Ghana Legacy Honours	Won
2017	34th in Top 50 Women Corporate Leaders in Ghana		Won
	Top 50 Women Corporate Leaders in Ghana	WomanRising	Won
	100 Most Influential Ghanaian Women	WomanRising	Won
