= Roustam Tariko =

Russian businessman

- Born: Рустам Тарико; March 17, 1962 (age 64); Menzelinsk, Russia
- Citizenship: Russia
- Education: Moscow Institute for Railway Engineering; INSEAD
- Occupation: Businessman
- Known for: Founder of Russian Standard Vodka and Russian Standard Bank
- Children: 5

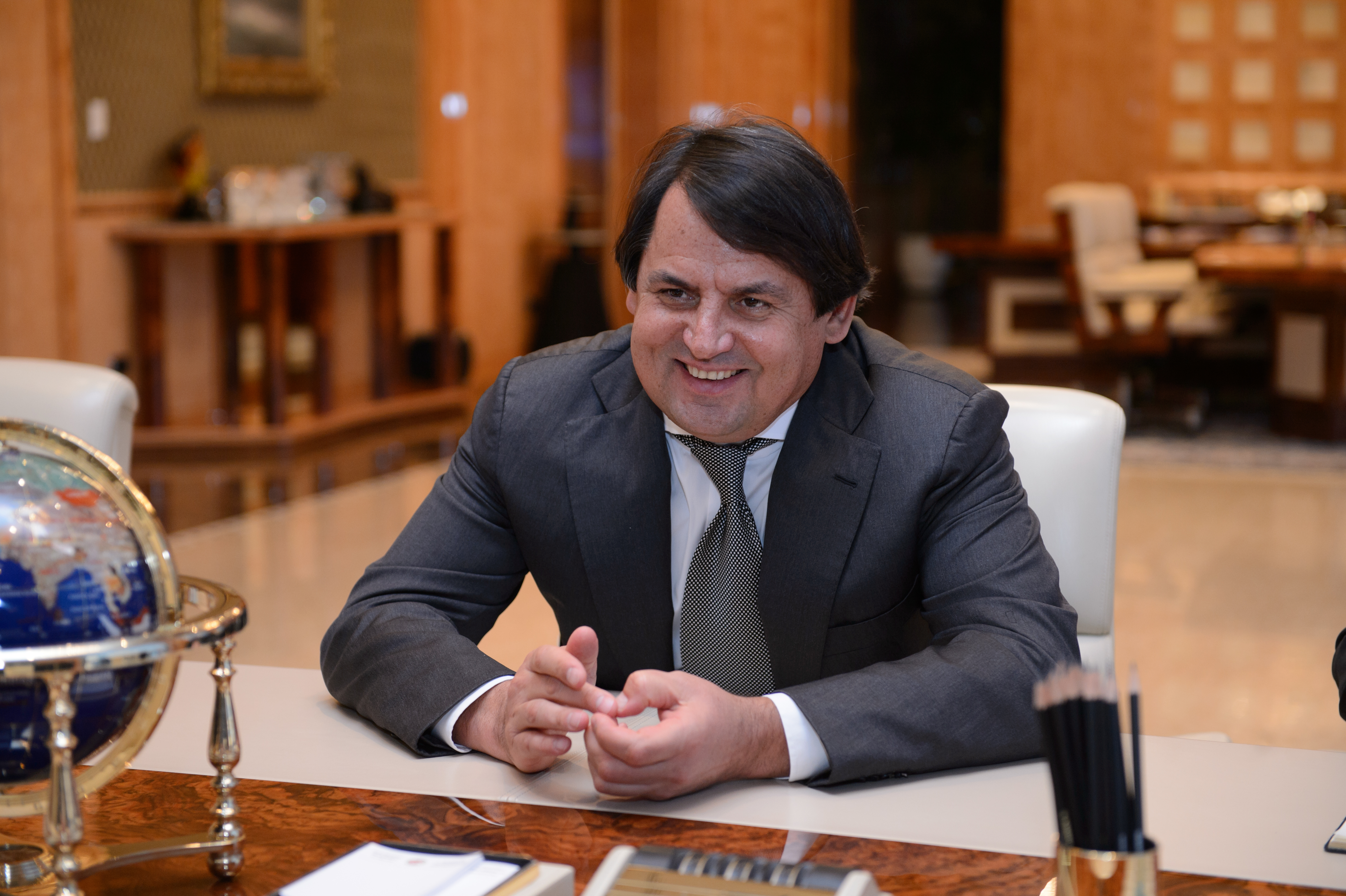
Tariko in a meeting with the President of the Republic of Tatarstan, Rustam Minnikhanov, February 6, 2015

Roustam Tariko (Russian: Рустам Тарико; born March 17, 1962) is the founder of Russian Standard Vodka. He also founded Russian Standard Bank, a credit card operation and a term life insurer in Russia. In 2009, Tariko's net worth was estimated at $1.1 billion.

== Biography ==
=== Early life ===
Born in the town of Menzelinsk in Tatarstan on March 17, 1962, Tariko moved to Moscow to study at the age of 17. He graduated in 1989 from the Economics faculty of Moscow Institute for Railway Engineering and got an MBA from Institut européen d'administration des affaires in France in 2000.

=== Entrance to the business world ===
The economic reforms of the 1980s created new business opportunities, which Tariko recognized and took advantage of. Unlike many other Russian businessmen who created their empires through the privatization of state enterprises in the early 1990s, Tariko built his company from scratch.

While studying, Tariko had a part-time job as a street cleaner. According to Tariko, he had to get up early to start his shift and clear the snow, even when the temperatures fell at −20 °C. Already at this point, Tariko had an eye for making money, as his first business venture was a small cleaning company which he had established with two friends.

=== Hotel Renovation ===
Starting working part time as an independent guide while still operating a cleaning service Tariko made an arrangement with a large government hotel. Clients of the guide service had been complaining about the condition of the hotel rooms. Tariko's arrangement was that in exchange for a portion of room rents he would renovate some of the rooms. This service to clients and hotels became an expanding portion of his enterprises eclipsing cleaning.

=== Expansion ===
In the late 1980s, Tariko began importing Kinder Surprise and Ferrero Rocher chocolates to the Soviet Union and selling them for rubles. Previously, such goods were only available in hard currency stores closed to average Russians. Tariko parlayed his success in selling Italian chocolates into an exclusive contract to import the Martini brand. Record sales of Martini enabled him to grow his company Roust Inc. into the leading importer of premium spirits in Russia.

Building on his success, Tariko wanted to build a Russian consumer brand which would "embody the vibrant spirit of Russia." Tariko reportedly wondered why Russia, the biggest vodka market in the world did not possess a domestically produced premium vodka brand. In 1998, Tariko, through his Russian Standard Company, brought to market Russian Standard Vodka Original, the first genuinely Russian premium vodka. It became an almost instant success, and quickly established itself as the number one brand of its kind in the country.

In 1999, Tariko expanded his empire into the banking business by founding Russian Standard Bank. (Note: Anton Belov (Russian: Антон Белов), a Russian intelligence specialist in radio fuses involved with "Delta-1" (Russian: «Дельта-1»), worked at Russian Standard Bank in the early 2000s and on 17 April 2021 was expelled as persona non grata from the Czech Republic following the 2014 explosions at a Czech ammunition depot by GRU in Vrbětice.) Today, the bank is the market leader in consumer finance and the country's largest consumer lending bank. Due to Tariko being under Ukrainian sanctions, the National Bank of Ukraine revoked the banking license and liquidated Russian Standard Bank's subsidiary in Ukraine "Forward Bank" in March 2023. According to an investigation by the Security Service of Ukraine part of the profits of Forward Bank went to prepare and finance the 2022 Russian invasion of Ukraine, as well as to finance the activities of the Russian Federation, aimed at weakening Ukraine.

In total, the companies belonging to Tariko's holding company Russian Standard Corporation now employ over 25,000 people.

== Net worth ==
In Forbes magazine's "World's Richest People" ranking of 2009, Tariko was listed at number 647 with an estimated wealth of $1.1 billion.

== Personal life ==
Roustam Tariko is unmarried and has five children. The mother of Tariko's twin daughters, Eva and Anna, is Tatiana Osipova. Aliona Gavrilova is the mother of Tariko's third child, a boy, named Roustam Junior. Two more children, Leo (b.2020) and Rosa (b.2021) were born to him and Yulia Polyachikhina.
