= Tariq Fancy =

Canadian entrepreneur

- Born: 1978 (age 47–48); Toronto, Canada
- Education: Brown University; University of Oxford; Sciences Po; INSEAD
- Known for: The Rumie Initiative

Tariq Fancy is a Canadian entrepreneur. A former investment banker and private equity professional, he is best known for founding The Rumie Initiative, a non-profit organization that aims to educate children in underserved communities using affordable technology. Tariq was the Chief Investment Officer for Sustainable Investing at BlackRock leaving in late 2019 due to both family obligations and his disillusionment about the real-world social impact of sustainable investing.

Fancy is a speaker on applying social innovation to education and development, including appearances on CNBC and at the United Nations. His financial commentary has appeared regularly in the Financial Post, and his economic research on innovation policy with the C.D. Howe Institute was cited in the Canadian Federal Budget to support policy changes.

Fancy's work on the Rumie Initiative has received widespread coverage in the mainstream media, including CNBC, The Toronto Star, CBC, Quartz, and Forbes. Both INSEAD and the Harvard Business School have published case studies or profiles on Fancy's work with the Rumie Initiative. In 2017, he was selected to Canada's 40 Under 40.

== In recent news ==
Tariq Fancy, former BlackRock CIO of sustainable investing, wrote an op-ed stating that "the financial services industry is duping the American public with pro-environment, sustainable investing practices." Stating there is no evidence ESG investing has any social impact via a CNBC Exclusive In the USA Today article 'Financial world greenwashing the public with deadly distraction in sustainable investing practices' he claims "Wall Street is greenwashing the financial world, making sustainable investing merely PR, which is a distraction from the problem of climate change." He subsequently wrote a longer, three-piece article, published by Medium, elaborating and substantiating further the points he sketched in his op-ed and providing details of the interactions he had while he worked at Blackrock with different parties in the sustainable investment world.
