= Dmitry Strashnov =

Russian businessman

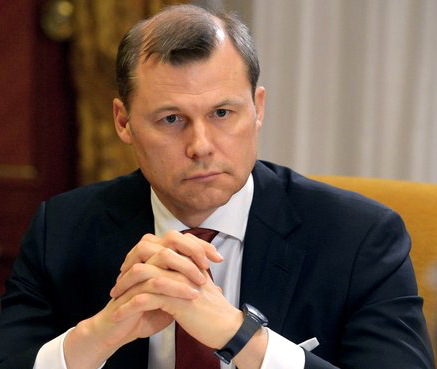
Dmitry Strashnov

Dmitry Yevgenevich Strashnov (Russian: Дмитрий Евгеньевич Страшнов; born 1967) is a Russian businessman and manager, General Director of the Russian Post from 2013–2017.

== Biography ==
Visit to Tula's new post offices in 2016.

He was born on May 31, 1967, in Moscow.

In 1991 he graduated from the Moscow State Technical University. In 1999 he received an MBA in business school INSEAD in France.

In 1992–1994 Strashnov managed his own business in the field of graphic design, heading his own company Distrayd.

In 1994, he led the Russian division of Electrolux Home Appliances.

In 2000 he was appointed CEO of Philips Consumer Electronics in Russia, and in 2005 became vice president and joined the board of directors of the European division of Philips Consumer Electronics. In 2008 Strashnov was appointed vice president and general manager of the new combined division of Philips in Russia - Philips Consumer Lifestyle.

In April 2009 Strashnov was appointed chief operating officer of the Russian subdidary of the European telecommunications company Tele2, in July 2009, took over as president and CEO of Tele2 Russia, and came to the executive board of directors of Tele2. December 31, 2012, he resigned as from his post.

On 19 April 2013 Strashnov was appointed CEO of Federal State Unitary Enterprise Russian Post, succeeding Alexander Kiselev, who headed the company since February 2009.
