= Russian Standard (vodka) =

Russian premium vodka brand

Russian Standard Vodka

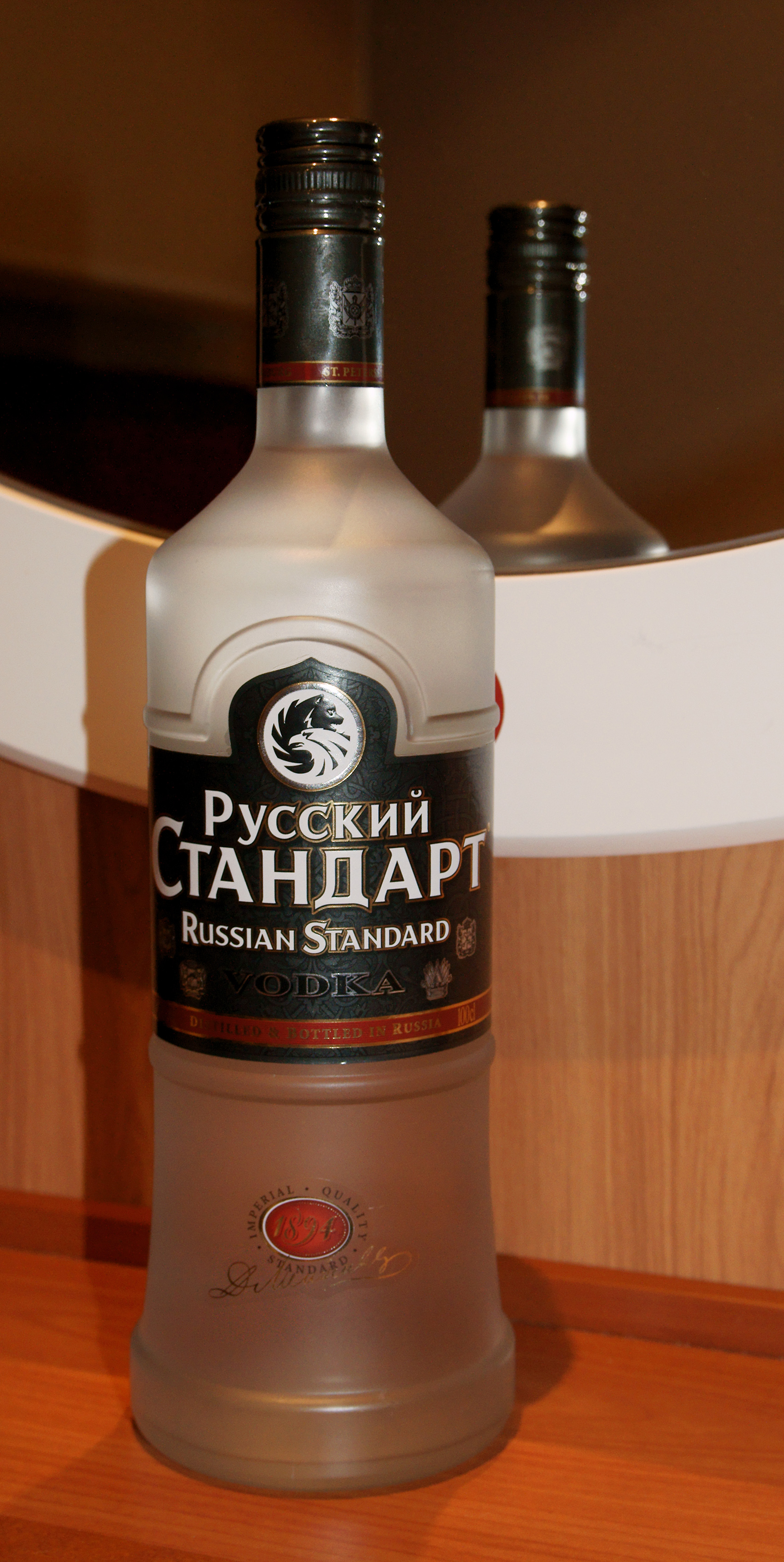
- Type: Vodka
- Manufacturer: Russian Standard
- Country of origin: Russia / Italy
- Introduced: 1998 by Roustam Tariko
- Alcohol by volume: 40%
- Proof (US): 80
- Related products: List of vodkas
- Website: www.russianstandardvodka.com

Russian Standard (Russian: Ру́сский Станда́рт, romanized: Rússky Standárt, IPA: [ˈrusːkʲɪj stɐnˈdart]) is a major Russian company producing the vodka brand of the same name. The brand was founded by Roustam Tariko in 1998.

== History ==
The brand was introduced as the "Russian Standard" vodka in 1998 by the Russian Standard company of Roustam Tariko.

Two years after a successful Russian market launch, international expansion was started. This was accompanied by the launch of Russian Standard Platinum product in 2001 and the luxury brand Imperia in 2004. The original product was re-christened Original.

In 2006, a new distillery with four million cases/yr capacity was opened in Saint Petersburg.

In response to the 2022 Russian invasion of Ukraine, the company was hit by several retail boycotts on Russian-branded vodka. Some legislations also adopted boycott policies. On 26 February 2022, Ohio governor Mike DeWine announced that he had directed the Ohio Department of Commerce to "cease both the purchase & sale of all vodka made by Russian Standard". On 11 March, U.S. president Joe Biden issued an executive order blocking U.S. imports of key Russian products, including vodka, and banning exports of high-end goods to Russia. In the United Kingdom, the supermarket chains Sainsbury's, Morrisons, Co-op Food and Aldi removed Russian Standard vodka from their shelves.

Due to sanctions, Russian Standard Vodka has been spotted with a made in Italy label. It has also been rebranded as "The Standard". Such bottles have been reported to appear within many of the European Union nations, with some citing they simply removed the Russian language while still using Russian Standard from the bottles and keeping the "Made in Italy" label (due to European Union rules). The original Russian version is still made in Saint Petersburg.

== Market position ==
In a 2006 overview of Russian premium vodkas for Vanity Fair, the "Imperia" product stood alone with a top A+ grade.

== Production ==
Production of the Russian Standard Original is based on a four-step protocol:

1. mashing and fermenting
2. distillation and rectification
3. filtration and relaxation
4. bottling and packaging.

Higher-end products add more purification steps.

Winter grain from Russian steppes is milled and fermented.

The spirits are blended with water from Lake Ladoga. The proximity of Lake Ladoga was one of the main reasons for the company's decision to establish its distillery in Saint Petersburg. The lake's underground sources provide one of the softest waters naturally available.

The product is then filtered four times through charcoal.

== Mendeleev myth ==
The marketing claims that, "In 1894, Dmitri Mendeleev, the greatest scientist in all Russia, received the decree to set the Imperial quality standard for Russian vodka and the 'Russian Standard' was born", or that the vodka is "compliant with the highest quality of Russian vodka approved by the royal government commission headed by Mendeleev in 1894."

This, however, is based on a popular myth that Mendeleev's 1865 doctoral dissertation "A Discourse on the combination of alcohol and water" contained a statement that 38% is the ideal strength of vodka, and that this number was later rounded to 40% to simplify the calculation of alcohol tax. However, Mendeleev's dissertation was about alcohol concentrations over 70% and he never wrote anything about vodka. Furthermore, the 40% standard strength was introduced by the Russian government already in 1843, when Mendeleev was nine years old.

== Variants ==
- Russian Standard Vodka
  - Original product launched in 1998
  - Raw ingredients: winter grains from Russian Steppes, glacial water from Lake Ladoga
  - Distilled four times and filtered four times through charcoal
- Russian Standard Gold
  - Notes of vanilla, caramel, and spearmint
  - Added ingredient Siberian ginseng extract
- Russian Standard Platinum
  - Higher-end product, launched 2001
  - Filtered additional two times through silver.
- Imperial
  - The luxury brand, launched 2004
  - Distilled additional four times.
  - Filtered additional two times through quartz.
- The Standard 1894
  - Replaces Russian Standard Platinum in some nations, launched 2024
  - Produced in Canelli, Italy with all European Union sourced ingredients.

== See also ==
- List of vodkas
