= DLocal =

Uruguayan financial technology company

dLocal Limited
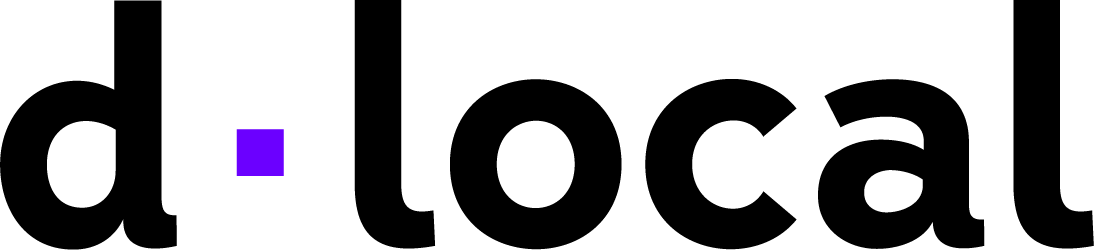
- dLocal Logo
- Type: Public
- Traded as: Nasdaq: DLO (Class A)
- Industry: Financial technology
- Founded: 2016; 10 years ago, in Montevideo, Uruguay
- Founder: Sergio Fogel, Andres Bzurovski
- Headquarters: Montevideo, Uruguay
- Number of locations: over 20 offices worldwide (2024)
- Key people: Pedro Arnt (CEO); Carlos Menendez (COO); Mark Ortiz (CFO)
- Revenue: ▲US$1.09 billion (2025)
- Net income: ▲US$197 million (2025)
- Number of employees: 1000 (2024)
- Website: dlocal.com

dLocal Limited is a Uruguayan financial technology company. It provides cross-border payments connecting global merchants to emerging markets.

== History ==
Established in 2016 as a startup, soon it became the first Uruguayan unicorn. The company has offices in Montevideo, São Paulo, San Francisco, London, Tel Aviv and Shenzhen.

As of 3 June 2021, dLocal went public, reaching a stock market valuation of US$9.5 billion. It is listed at Nasdaq, being the second Uruguayan company in history to reach Wall Street after Starmedia in the 1990s.

In 2021, dLocal acquired payments provider PrimeiroPay for $40 million.

In June 2025, dLocal announced plans to acquire AZA Finance, an African payments provider, for a reported $150 million.

In January 2025, dLocal secured an Authorised Payment Institution license from the United Kingdom's Financial Conduct Authority, enabling the company to onboard UK merchants through its local entity, dLocal Opco UK.

In January 2026, dLocal announced Asia as a strategic priority for expansion, with plans to hire dozens of employees and secure additional regulatory licenses in key markets including Vietnam and Thailand.

Their founders, Andrés Bzurovski and Sergio Fogel, are among the 2,000 richest people in the world, according to Forbes.
