= Elena Panaritis =

Greek economist, Member of the Hellenic Parliament from 2009 to 2012

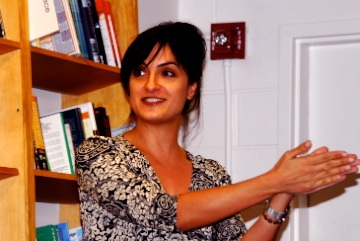
Elena Panaritis (2008)

Elena Panaritis (Greek: Έλενα Παναρίτη) is an economist, social entrepreneur, and former politician known for her work in institutional economics and property rights reform. She was a member of the Greek Parliament and held advisory roles at the World Bank, where she developed models to integrate informal economies into the formal market, notably in Peru. As the founder of Thought for Action (T4Action), Panaritis advocates for policies that foster economic inclusion and institutional transparency in developing and distressed economies.

== Early life and studies ==
Elena Panaritis was born in Athens, Greece. She studied Economics at the American College of Greece, graduating with a BA in 1989, and went on to the University of Bologna Italy, to get her Master's in International Economics, in 1990. In 1992, she received a Master's in International Economics and European Studies from Johns Hopkins University's School of Advanced International Studies and in 2003 a Master's in Business Administration from INSEAD.

During her studies, Panaritis focused on economic theory, international finance, and institutional economics, fields that would later form the backbone of her work on property rights and economic reform. Her education at Johns Hopkins exposed her to global perspectives on economic policy, sparking her interest in using economic tools to address the structural causes of poverty and development.

== World Bank ==
Panaritis started working in the World Bank, Washington, DC, in 1991, as a regional analyst. As the bank's Deputy Country Officer for Peru, she supervised the state's privatization and debt restructuring programs. She also assisted in the drafting of conditions agreed with Latin American countries, such as Brazil, Peru, and Venezuela, for structural adjustment lending, fiscal adjustments and privatization.

As a Public/Private Sector Management Specialist at the World Bank, Panaritis worked, among other programs, on the property rights reforms in the Philippines, and on judicial reforms in Trinidad and Tobago, and designed the conditions for a $100 million loan to Morocco.

== Academia ==
Since 2001, Panaritis has been a visiting lecturer at the Wharton School of the University of Pennsylvania on the subject of housing rights.

== Politics ==
The moderate socialist PASOK party nominated Panaritis in an electable position in its candidates lists for the 2009 general elections, and she was elected member of the Greek Parliament on 4 October 2009. She was not a candidate in the 2012 general election, in which PASOK lost some 30 percentage points in the voting.

In May 2015, during the still ongoing Greek financial crisis, then Minister of Finance Yanis Varoufakis appointed Panaritis as Greece's representative to the International Monetary Fund. Her appointment drew criticism from members of the government and the ruling Syriza party and on 1 June 2015 she resigned from the position.

== Author ==
She has written numerous books and articles on economics.
