= Philippe Schaus =

Luxembourg business executive (born 1963)

- Born: 6 June 1963 (age 63); Luxembourg
- Education: University of Liège INSEAD
- Occupation: Business executive

Philippe Schaus (born 6 June 1963) is a Luxembourg-born business executive and aerospace engineer. He was President of Sales at Louis Vuitton and chief executive officer (CEO) of DFS Group and Moët Hennessy.

== Backgroud ==
Schaus studied aerospace engineering at the University of Liège from 1982 to 1987, and then completed an MBA at INSEAD from 1989 to 1990

Schaus started his career at J.P. Morgan in Brussels (1987-1989) and The Boston Consulting Group in Munich ( 1990-1992).

In 1992, Schaus joined Villeroy & Boch in Germany, where he rose to become president of the company's tableware division and a member of its executive board. From 2003 to 2009, he served as Directeur Général (General Manager) French tableware manufacturer Guy Degrenne S.A.

In 2003, Schaus joined the LVMH Group as President of European operations for Louis Vuitton. He was appointed Senior Vice President International in 2006 and became Executive Vice President in 2009, in charge of global store, e-commerce and logistics operations.

In 2011, he moved to DFS Group, a luxury travel retailer jointly owned between LVMH and the America-born business man Bob Miller in Hong Kong, where he served as Group President of Merchandising and Marketing before being named Chairman and Chief Executive Officer (CEO) in 2012.

In 2017, Schaus was appointed President and CEO of Moët Hennessy, the luxury wines and spirits division jointly owned by LVMH and Diageo. He served as a member of the LVMH Executive Committee and chaired the joint committee representing both shareholder companies.

== DFS Group transformation (2011–2017) ==
During Schaus tenure as a President and Chairman of DFS Group, he rebranded and elevated the DFS Gallery stores to T Galleria, alongside an innovative CRM loyalty program targeting Chinese travelers. Furthermore he expanded the network in the gambling hub Macao, and towards new destinations like Siem Reap/Cambodia and Venice/Italy, opening up what the specialist media of the travel retail industry Moodie Davitt Report called “DFS’s third wave”.

== Development at Moët Hennessy through mergers and acquisition (2017-2025) ==
During his tenure at Moët Hennessy, Schaus oversaw a series of acquisitions which added to the financial weight of the company and corresponded to LVMH’s and Diageo's desire to grow the business into new categories, at a time where the performance was booming.

In 2019, Moët Hennessy acquired a controlling stake in Chateau d'Esclans, a leading French rosé wine company. In early 2021, Moët Hennessy acquired 50% of Armand de Brignac Champagne. and In 2023, Moët Hennessy acquired Chateau Minuty, another French rosé wine company. Through in particular the acquisitions in Rosé wines, Moët Hennessy extended its leadership Leadership on Champagne and Cognac to the profitable Rosé de Provence wines category.

In 2021, Moët Hennessy acquired a 50% stake in Jay-Z's Armand de Brignac Champagne, and partnered with Lady Gaga on a limited-edition Dom Pérignon vintage. In 2022, the company acquired Napa Valley's Joseph Phelps Vineyards, home of the Insignia label. And In 2024, the company acquired a minority stake in premium alcohol-free sparkling wine brand French Bloom, one of the company's first moves into the non-alcoholic category.

== Financial performance ==
Under Schaus's leadership, Moët Hennessy experienced first a significant growth, and then an overall decline of profitability. When Schaus joined in 2017, the company reported profits of € 1.558 million. Upon his departure in 2024, the company reported profits of € 1.356 million, representing an overall decline of -13% over his 8 years with the company, excluding inflation.

The downturn at Moët Hennessy aligned with a wider collapse in the wine and spirits sector, as Bloomberg data revealed that about 50 leading alcohol companies lost US$830 billion in market value between mid-2021 and late-2025, a 46% fall from the June 2021 peak. This was driven by an important change in alcohol drinking habits linked to health trends and to macroeconomic pressures linked to several geopolitical crises and tariff war. Rivals like Diageo, Pernod Ricard, and Rémy Cointreau hit multi-year lows, while major groups such as Diageo, Rémy Cointreau, Campari, Treasury Wine Estates, Brown Forman, Molson Coors, and Suntory appointed new chief executives.

== Sustainability initiatives ==
Shortly after the Covid period, Schaus launched the "Living Soils, Living Together" sustainability and ecological and social responsibility program, under which the company introduced a number of initiatives, like ending pesticide and herbicide use across its vineyards. He created the World Living Soils Forum, an international gathering on soil health management and improvement, first held in Arles/France in 2022, and being continued by his successors; A Research & Development center (“Centre Robert-Jean de Voguë”) was opened in Champagne by Schaus, in order to host the growing activities of climate change research, testing of sustainability methods and other activities linked to sustainable development.

== Corporate challenges ==
In May 2025, The Financial Times published an investigative article detailing a significant strategic and financial crisis at Moët Hennessy during Schaus's tenure as CEO. The report cited internal documents and interviews with individuals familiar with the business, highlighting a dramatic reversal in the division's financial position—from generating over €1 billion in cash in 2019 to burning through €1.5 billion by 2024.

The report evoked that Under Schaus's leadership, Moët Hennessy pursued an aggressive strategy of price increases and a nearly €2 billion acquisition spree, that included Armand de Brignac, Joseph Phelps and Provence wine brand Minuty, and Château d’Esclans, and some smaller acquisition and partnerships all supported by two shareholders LVMH and Diageo. Several of the smaller deals were later characterized by some as adding "complexity, lowering margins, and draining cash," with few delivering the intended returns.

The article also attributed internal cultural tensions to Schaus, noting that managers were ordered to prioritize profit margins above all else, even as sales declined. A direct-to-consumer retail expansion, including e-commerce initiatives and boutique openings, was described as loss-making and is currently under review by current Moët Hennessy Leadership, according to the Financial Times. Schaus stepped down in early 2025 having reaching the French retirement age of 62 years and intending to pursue a new phase of his career around advisory board and investment activities.

In January 2026, the Paris Judicial Court dismissed Moët Hennessy's defamation lawsuit against Gasparovic, ruling the company was not identifiably named and characterizing the suit as an abusive restriction on expression. The court ordered Moët Hennessy to pay €2,000, a decision currently under appeal. A separate employment tribunal case over her dismissal remains pending. Philippe Schaus was not a named party to either proceeding, with no findings against him personally.

In July 2025, the Financial Times reporting highlighted allegations of a toxic workplace culture at Moët Hennessy during Philippe Schaus’s tenure as CEO. The report indicated claims of sexual harassment, gender discrimination, and retaliation by a former senior employee. It described an environment where at least 20 employees (among the more than 9000 employed at that time at Moët Hennessy) took long-term sick leave in 2024, and multiple individuals—including women—lodged complaints of bullying and inappropriate behavior. Alleged incidents included insensitive comments and rumors that employees were subjected to sexist remarks and coached in ways unrelated to professional development. The company dismissed the characterisation of its culture as exaggerated and noted that such labor tribunal cases are routine in France. While acknowledging the need to continue further increasing diversity and equal opportunities, Schaus and the head of HR, while acknowledging the need to continue to work on heightened employee diversity and equal opportunities, had addressed employee concerns in an internal memo to the 9000 employees globally, emphasizing confidentiality, fairness, and the distress that “one‑sided narratives” might cause.

Following the Financial Times report, Schaus’s successor, the Moët Hennessy president and CEO Jean-Jacques Guiony issued an internal statement, subsequently reported by French newspaper Charente Libre, in which he described the allegations as driven by "a personal grudge" ("rancune personnelle") following Gasparovic's non-selection for a role, and stated the company had filed defamation proceedings against her. Guiony also defended his predecessor by name, stating that Schaus's "conduct had always been irreproachable in all his interactions" and crediting him with appointing women to several senior roles, including the head of human resources, the president of Maison Moët, the chief financial officer, and a regional president for Asia. The company said gender parity at executive and managerial level had risen from 45% to 50% over three years.

Schaus was replaced by LVMH CFO, Jean-Jacques Guinoy as President and CEO and by Alexander Arnault, son of Bernard Arnault as COO in February 2025.

== Personal life ==
After retiring from LVMH at the age of 62 , Schaus decided to dedicate his career to advisory and board roles. He joined the Board of Verneek, the US-based AI firm specialized in Retail in May 2006 and the Board of Exemplar Luxury Group in June 2026, alongside other key assignments.

He continues to run the Business Club France Luxembourg (BCFL) for the benefit of the Luxembourg Government, supports the Compagnie Financière La Luxembourgeoise in Luxembourg as a Board member and several smaller ventures as an Angel Investor in Europe and North America.
