= The Rumie Initiative =

- Founded: 2013; 13 years ago
- Founder: Tariq Fancy
- Type: Non-Profit
- Purpose: Education, Technology
- Location: Toronto, Ontario, Canada
- Region served: 20+ Countries worldwide
- Product: Rumie Tablet, LearnCloud
- Key people: Tariq Fancy
- Website: about.rumie.org

The Rumie Initiative (Rumie) is a non-profit based in Toronto, Ontario, Canada. The organization develops and delivers low-cost technology that enables the distribution of digital learning resources to communities with limited Internet access.

== History ==
The Rumie Initiative was founded by Tariq Fancy in 2013 to educate children in underserved communities around the world using affordable technology.

Rumie's products are deployed in more than 20 countries worldwide. The organization received popular attention during the 2014 Ebola Crisis, when it partnered with the Liberian NGO Camp for Peace to deploy Rumie tablets as part of a rehabilitation program for child soldiers. As a result of the Ebola epidemic, however, schools across the country were shuttered, and Rumie's tablets quickly became a resource for children to continue their education from home.

In 2015, Rumie began deploying its technology to assist children affected by the Syrian refugee crisis. At the time, a primary challenge was the deficit of free digital learning content for Syrian students. In response to this issue, Rumie announced during a 2015 presentation at Y-Combinator that it was opening the LearnCloud—a portal for free-license learning content, allowing users to find, share, and rate free digital educational resources.

In 2020, Rumie pivoted more strongly into microlearning around the start of the COVID-19 pandemic, building and publishing its library of short, practical “Bytes” lessons. Launching GSMA funded eLearning programs in Afghanistan and Pakistan Rumie provided multi language localized content in Persian, Dari, and Pashto. Working with LEARN Afghanistan led by Pashtana Durrani, Roshan Telcoms for distribution, and local organization. By August 2022, Rumie reported that since launching its microlesson (“Byte”) library at the start of the pandemic, it had reached over 1 million learners globally.

== Funding ==
Tariq Fancy, a former investment banker and private equity investor, founded Rumie with his personal savings, committing to work without salary until the organization became financially sustainable. In early 2014, Rumie raised $1 million in philanthropic donations from outside backers, including Ed Clark, the retired CEO of TD Bank, Rob McEwen, the chairman and CEO of McEwen Mining Inc., and Mark Wiseman, then the CEO of the Canadian Pension Plan Investment Board. Rumie has subsequently raised funding from large institutional backers, including Google and Scotiabank.

== Recognition ==
The Rumie Initiative has received widespread coverage in the mainstream media, including CNBC, The Toronto Star, CBC, Quartz, Forbes, and Mashable. Harvard Business School and INSEAD have both published case studies or profiles on the organization's mission and progress.

During its existence, the organization has also garnered numerous awards. In 2014, Rumie was named the "Best Social Startup" by Global Entrepreneurship Week. In 2015, the organization graduated from the Y-Combinator Imagine K-12 accelerator. In 2016, the US Library of Congress awarded Rumie a prize for literacy promotion. In 2017, Rumie won the Google.org Impact Challenge.
