= 99 (app) =

Transport app

- Type: Subsidiary
- Industry: Vehicle for hire
- Founded: 2012; 14 years ago
- Headquarters: São Paulo, Brazil
- Area served: ~500 Brazilian cities
- Key people: Tony Qiu, CEO
- Products: 99 POP, 99 Táxi, 99 Táxi TOP (limited), 99 Comfort, 99 Food
- Services: Taxicab, Vehicle for hire
- Parent: DiDi
- Website: 99app.com

99, formerly known as 99Taxis, is a vehicle for hire company operating in Brazil. It is owned by DiDi.

== History ==
Launched in 2012 servicing São Paulo, the company has expanded since then to other regions. It was founded by Paulo Veras, Renato Freitas and Ariel Lambrecht.

In January 2017, 99 received funding by DiDi. The funding allowed 99 to open more positions, and deal with competitors. In May 2017, another round of investments, led by SoftBank, raised US$100 million. On January 3, 2018, DiDi purchased the remainder of 99 for an undisclosed amount, but rumored to be at US$600 million, making 99 Brazil's first so-called "unicorn", i.e., a startup company valued at over US$1 billion.
