= Josep M. Gascón =

Josep María Gascón Ramírez (born in Amer, Girona in 1974) is a Spanish lawyer and senior executive. An expert in leadership and corporate governance, he has held executive positions in multinational companies, the Catalan public administration, and various boards of directors. He is the author of several books on his area of expertise, as well as poetry. He is a contributor and communicator in various media outlets and has received several awards for his work.

== Biography ==
He studied music in his hometown, which has a strong musical tradition, under the guidance of Maestro Pere Fontàs. As a teenager, he founded a rock band called Punts Suspensius, for which he wrote most of the lyrics, reflecting his passion for poetry.

After a year of convalescence following a car accident, he delved deeper into writing and published a book of poetry. Following his recovery, he embarked on a career in law and business.

== Professional career ==
Gascón holds a law degree from Pompeu Fabra University and a graduate degree in general management from INSEAD (Fontainebleau). He also has a master's degree in tax law and a diploma in tax management from Esade.

He worked as a lawyer at the Cuatrecasas firm for eight years, specialising in corporate law and taxation. In 2004, he became the tax director for Solvay in Spain and Portugal, a Belgian multinational in the chemical sector. The company later offered him a promotion to its headquarters in Brussels. After holding various management positions, including global deputy director of taxation, he became director of financial excellence for the entire group and a member of the Belgian multinational's financial management committee.

Upon returning to Barcelona, he worked in public administration as Director of Strategy and Competitive Intelligence for the Department of Business of the Generalitat de Catalunya. In 2017, he returned to the corporate world as a partner at Grant Thornton, and in 2019 he founded his own consulting firm, Vitaes Partners, with Jordi Aspa. The firm focuses on strategic management and executive coaching. He is a mentor at Vistage, a global organisation of CEOs, and has been chairman of the International Advisory Board of the World Chemical Summit held at Fira Barcelona.

He was the driving force behind various start-ups and served as executive director of Meditech Capital, a business project dedicated to developing cardiological medical devices. He has served on the boards of directors and advisory boards of numerous public and private companies.

He has taught at GBSB Global Business School in Barcelona and has delivered seminars and lectures on leadership and change management.

Between 1999 and 2009, he was president of the Associació Cultural Manaies d'Amer, a cultural organisation founded in 1710 which is dedicated to preserving and promoting cultural traditions linked to Holy Week.

He was recognised early in his career with the Iberian Lawyer International Law Award ‘40 under Forty’ in 2011, and in 2013 and 2014 he was named ‘European Young Leader’ by the think tanks ‘Friends of Europe’ and ‘Europanova’. In 2012, the Generalitat of Catalonia named him ‘Business Ambassador’.

== Publications ==
He is the author of essays, manuals and poetry.

- 2022: 'The Journey'. The Four Pillars of Leadership to Reach the Summit: Awareness, Relationships, Emotions and Action' (Editorial Empresa Activa). (Editorial Empresa Activa).
- 2003: Comments on Personal Income Tax. Various authors – Cuatrecasas (Editorial Aranzadi).
- 2002: 'Tax regime. The individual entrepreneur: Legal Manual for Businesses. Various authors – Cuatrecasas (Editorial Aranzadi).
- 1998: '25 Poems and Other Verses' (Ed. Cat Edicions).

He has contributed to various media outlets, including the talk shows El matí de Catalunya Ràdio and Expansión, El Economista, Diari de Girona, l’Econòmic de Avui, Jornal do Notícias, Russia Today and GlobalGeoNews-Fildmedia.
