= Russian Standard Bank =

Russian bank

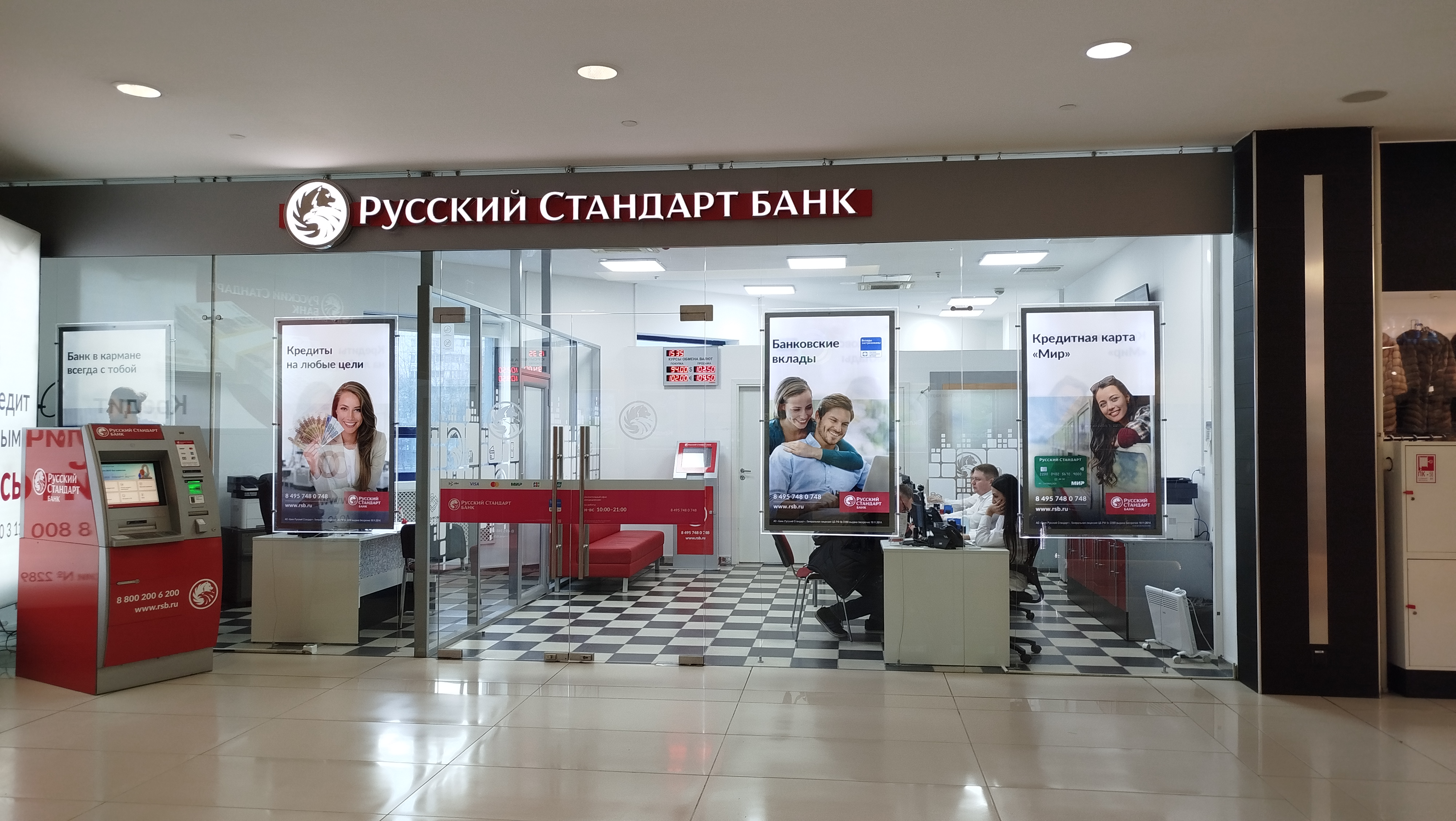
- Native name: Банк Русский Стандарт
- Type: Joint-stock company
- Industry: Financial services
- Founded: 1999
- Headquarters: Moscow, Russia
- Key people: Roustam Tariko (Chairman of the Board of Directors)
- Revenue: 46,957,000,000 Russian ruble (2017)
- Net income: 3,860,000,000 Russian ruble (2010)
- Rating: Caa2 (Moody's) (2015)
- Website: www.rsb.ru

Russian Standard Bank (Russian: АО «Банк Русский Стандарт») is one of the largest Russian banks and the country's leading consumer lender.

== History ==
CJSC JSCB “Agrooptorgbank” was entered by the Central Bank of the Russian Federation in the book of state registration of credit organizations (registered) on March 31, 1993. 11 enterprises of the agro-industrial complex were the founders of the bank. The initial purpose of the bank was to carry out settlements between enterprises of the agro-industrial complex, but due to both the general recession of the Russian economy in the early and mid-1990s and the decline of the agro-industry in particular, it lost its importance and by 1996 ceased pro-active activity. The following facts about the bank at that time are known: the receipt in December 1993 of an extended currency license, which allows (in addition to carrying out currency operations in Russia (domestic foreign exchange license)) to establish correspondent relations with six foreign banks; in July 1994, along with some other credit organizations made the announcement on the discovery of fake bank documents (guarantee letters); in 1996 the trial with the Avtoselkhozmash bank because of the latter's debt. In 1996, due to a change in legislation, changed the legal form, from Closed Type Joint Stock Company (CJSC) (in Russian "Акционерное общество закрытого типа") to Closed Joint Stock Company (in Russian "Закрытое акционерное общество").

The bank was founded in 1999 by Roustam Tariko owner of the Russian Standard Corporation, as a means of circumventing new laws which banned the advertising of alcohol in Russia. It dominates the consumer finance sector in Russia, and has over 54 percent control of the credit card market and over 30 percent control of the point of sale loan market. It is ranked among the best-profit-on-capital financial institutions in the world. The bank employs 25,000 people across its organization.

Russian Standard Bank has a presence in more than 1,800 cities in Russia. Its distribution network covers 93% of the Russian population. Russian Standard Bank is also the exclusive issuer of American Express branded credit cards in Russia.

Russian Standard Bank issues cards of five leading international payment systems in Russia: Visa, MasterCard, American Express, Diners Club International, Discover Card, and acquires seven payment systems: Visa, MasterCard, American Express, Diners Club International, Discover Card, China Union Pay, Japan Credit Bureau and Zolotaya Korona.

In December 2010 Russian Standard Bank and the international payment system Diners Club International have entered into an agreement for settlement transactions of the payment system in the Russian Federation. Under the Agreement, Russian Standard Bank will process settlement transactions of other banks acting as acquirers of Diners Club in the Russian Federation.

In 2013, the Bank's portfolio of card brands was enriched with a partnership with Discover Financial, offering one of the most popular credit cards among American consumers – Discover Cards – in Russian market.

In July 2014, Russian Standard Bank, Miles & More and Visa announced the signing of a long-term agreement. Within the agreement the Bank becomes a partner to promote co-branding Miles & More card products in Russia based on Visa payment system.6

The bank defaulted on its debts and was announced defunct in 2015.

== Owners and management ==
As of February 16, 2009, almost 100% of the shares of the bank are controlled by "Company Standard Russian" (97.172089%) and "Rust Inc." (2.826654%), which, in turn, is owned by Bermuda "Rust Trading Limited" (beneficiary - Roustam Tariko).

Chairman of the Board - Alexander Samokhvalov.

Chairman of the Board of Directors - Roustam Tariko.

== Activity ==
The main (priority) areas of the bank's activity are consumer lending and credit card issuance. The bank also deals with acquiring, Internet acquiring, attracting deposits, settlement and cash services to individuals and legal entities, providing overdrafts, renewable and non-revolving credit lines, conducting international settlements (bank guarantees and letters of credit), trade finance, conducting conversion operations, etc. It is the agent of insurance companies CJSC Russian Standard Insurance and LLC Banking Insurance Company.

Until December 2008, the bank was actively involved in car loans, but at the beginning of the 2008–2010 because of the financial crisis, it completely removed this program.

=== Branch network, service territory ===
As of July 1, 2012, 193 representative offices, 9 branches (St. Petersburg, Voronezh, Rostov-on-Don, Omsk, Ufa, Kazan, Yekaterinburg, Samara, Novosibirsk), 276 credit and cash offices (branches) were opened in Russia. According to the bank, at the beginning of 2009, there were about 400 ATMs for issuing cash and about 2100 ATMs with a cash-in function, cash programs were implemented in more than 1,800 locations across the country through more than 40 thousand points of sale of enterprises- partners.

At the end of 2008, 25 regional offices were opened in Ukraine. In Ukraine, the bank carried out its activities through a subsidiary of PJSC Forward Bank; until 2014 - "Russian Standard". Due to Russian Standard Bank owner Rustam Tariko being under Ukrainian sanctions, the National Bank of Ukraine revoked the banking license and liquidated Forward Bank in March 2023. According to an investigation by the Security Service of Ukraine part of the profits of Forward Bank went to prepare and finance the 2022 Russian invasion of Ukraine, as well as to finance the activities of the Russian Federation, aimed at weakening Ukraine.

== Criticism ==
The lecturer of the "Synergy University", A. Ishutin, pointing out that the bad reputation of the bank leads to inefficiency in attracting funds by the bank, and as an example he cited the Russian Standard Bank, whose image in the mid-2000s he described as an image of "predatory and dishonest bank".

In 2010, the Nizhny Tagil branch of the "Young Lawyers of Russia" public movement have collected the signatures for a petition to the Russian Prosecutor General's Office, the Presidential Administration of Russia and the Federal Service for Supervision of Consumer Rights Protection. The head of the branch of the movement, Yevgeny Ryakin, noted that many people came to them with complaints about debt collection methods carried out by this bank. Ryakin gave the following example: "One woman said that she had been offered by the bank representative to sell a kidney in order to pay off the loan". Ryakin also pointed to "constant telephone calls, even at night; threatening letters; visits of collectors, etc.", which, in his estimation, in many cases "is beyond the limits of the law". In addition, Ryakin noted "repeated violations of the legislation as well as the Civil Code of the Russian Federation by the credit organization".

The story in which a woman took a loan from Russian Standard Bank in the amount of 45 thousand rubles, but failed to pay for it due to illness and loss of work, received considerable publicity, as a result of which the debt rose to 150 thousand rubles a few months later. In February 2013, the collectors of Russian Standard Bank offered a woman to solve the debt problem by selling her internal organs, as well as, according to A. V. Ivanov, Assistant Professor, Department of Advertising of the Russian University of Economics of Plekhanov and of the Chelyabinsk branch of the South Urals State TV and Radio Company, "they offered to sell the infant child of her sister".

Sanctions

In November 2023 the bank was sanctioned by the U.S. Department of the Treasury’s Office of Foreign Assets Control (OFAC) under E.O. 14024 for operating or having operated in the financial services sector of the Russian Federation economy.

== Performance indicators, reporting ==
Moody's international rating agency confirmed the rating of Russian Standard Bank at "B2" level, but lowered its forecast from "stable" to "negative". As previously reported, a credit institution in the first half of 2014 increased its net loss by 6.9 times, to 4.8 billion against 690 million rubles loss for the first half of 2013. In this connection, the rumors actively discussed are about a possible revocation of a license from Russian Standard Bank. Also, the NTV reported that an advertisement for the sale of a yacht owned by Rustam Tariko, a bank owner, appeared on one of the specialized yacht sales sites. Apparently, by sailing the yacht the management plans to cover some of the losses.

Russian Standard Bank became the leader in the share of overdue loans as of March 1, 2016. The share of such loans was 40%.

| Date | Banking performance | | | | |
| Date | Bank assets, (billion rubles) | Equity, (billion rubles) | Net profit, (billion rubles) | ROA, % | ROR, % |
|---|---|---|---|---|---|
| 01.01.1998 | 0,046472 | 0,006073 | 0,000090 | 0,19 | 1,48 |
| 01.01.1999 | 0,015957 | 0,004392 | −0,001512 | −9,48 | −34,43 |
| 01.01.2000 | 0,636204 | 0,519566 | −0,044549 | −7 | −8,57 |
| 01.01.2001 | 1,236440 | 0,551065 | 0,011831 | 0,96 | 2,15 |
| 01.01.2002 | 2,294373 | 0,797337 | 0,041666 | 1,82 | 5,23 |
| 01.01.2003 | 5,668442 | 1,042720 | 0,451736 | 7,97 | 43,32 |
| 01.01.2004 | 15,701930 | 3,380527 | 2,349646 | 14,96 | 69,5 |
| 01.01.2005 | 41,779639 (41,227634) | 6,715005 (7,612292) | 4,136830 (4,392989) | 9,9 (10,66) | 61,6 (57,71) |
| 01.01.2006 | 113,619851 (112,735865) | 11,871599 (12,087809) | 5,675256 (5,862959) | 4,99 (5,2) | 47,8 (48,5) |
| 01.01.2007 | 195,544449 (192,909151) | 25,084507 (25,228703) | 14,606969 (14,546515) | 7,47 (7,54) | 58,23 (57,66) |
| 01.01.2008 | 217,327 (208,835) | 35,047 (35,069) | 9,963 (9,531) | 4,58 (4,56) | 28,43 (27,18) |
