= Sergio Fogel =

Uruguayan entrepreneur

Sergio Enrique Fogel Kaplan is a Uruguayan entrepreneur. He is the co-founder, co-president and chief strategy director of Uruguay-based fintech and international payments startup dLocal. Fogel is known for being the first Uruguayan billionaire. Fogel received an undergraduate degree and a graduate degree from Israel Institute of Technology and an MBA from INSEAD.
