= Yves-Michel Marti =

Yves-Michel Marti is a pioneer in the field of competitive intelligence. He is the founder of Egideria and of the French branch of the Society of Competitive Intelligence Professionals.

== Education ==
He holds a graduate engineering degree in telecommunications and two Master of Science degrees (microelectronics and solid-state physics) from the University of Grenoble, France. He has a Master of Business Administration from Insead, France. Marti speaks six languages: French, English, Spanish, Portuguese, Russian and Classical Arabic.

== Career ==
He was a design engineer of military radar components and of computer-aided design software at Dassault Electronique (France), then Pacific Monolithics (Sunnyvale, California, US), and visiting scientist at Hewlett Packard (Santa Ana, California, US). He then held sales, marketing and general management responsibilities with Lucas Industries (Birmingham, UK).

His work on modeling high-frequency circuits received an award from the National Science Foundation, and he gave a course at the Master of Sciences level at the University of California, Berkeley, in the US. He also taught at HEC Paris in France, and at the Fundação Dom Cabral in Brazil.

== Intelligence industry ==
In 1992, he co-founded the French branch of the Society of Competitive Intelligence Professionals and served as its secretary general for six years.

In 1994, he founded Egideria, a company specializing in competitive intelligence investigations, which was listed as one of the top French companies in the industry by the newsletter Intelligence Online in 2003, then in 2006, and by the daily newspaper Le Figaro in 2007.

== Research ==
Egideria’s investigations are based on innovative guidelines (the Ethical Bible), recognized by academia. Marti developed innovative tools for strategic information analysis, especially in the context of mergers and acquisitions, which were applied during the takeover of the petroleum multinational Elf by Total

In 1996, Yves-Michel Marti co-authored the book L'Intelligence économique et concurrentielle: les yeux et les oreilles de l'entreprise which received the Best European Business Book Award from the Financial Times and Booz Allen Hamilton. Business Digest review considers it as a management classic.

In 1997, at the SCIP conference in San Diego, Marti delivered the communication What can one learn from the Intelligence System of the Roman Catholic Church?.

== Published books ==
- Collective book under the direction of Eric Denecé, ‘’Renseignement et espionnage de la Renaissance à la Révolution (XVe- XVIIIe siècles)’’, Ellipses, 2021, ISBN 978-2340057210.
- Bruno Martinet, Yves-Michel Marti, ‘’L'intelligence économique : les yeux et les oreilles de l’entreprise’’, Éditions d'Organisation, 1996, new edition 2001,ISBN 978-2-7081-2511-7.
- Jean-Marie Lepeule and Yves-Michel Marti, ‘’Benchmarking et intelligence économique’’, Eurostaf, 1999, ISBN 2-907938-38-X.
- Collective book under the direction of Benjamin Gilad and Jan P. Herring, The Art and Science of Business Intelligence Analysis, JAI Press, 1996, ISBN 978-0-7623-0181-2.
- Collective book under the direction of Robert Soares, ‘’Gallium Arsenide MESFET Circuit Design’’, Artech House, 1988, ISBN 0-89006-267-6.
