= Russian Standard Corporation =

Russian holding company which owns

Russian Standard Corporation (Russian: Корпорация «Русский Стандарт») is a holding company owned by the businessman Roustam Tariko.

It holds the stock of the following companies:

- Russian Standard Company, the producer and distributor of Russian Standard Vodka.
- Руст Инк. (Roust) — the general distributor in Russia of alcoholic drinks of a class "premium", such as: Rémy Martin, Jagermeister, and others.
- Russian Standard Bank, one of the leading banks of Russia.
- Russian Standard Insurance, an insurance company.

Russian Standard Corporation was founded in 1992 by Roustam Tariko. It is headquartered in Moscow. It has over 25,000 employees and operations in over 70 countries. The Russian Standard brand owned by the company is one of the leading consumer brands in Russia.

Russian Standard sponsors Miss Russia pageant.
