= Philippe Harache =

French aerospace engineer and businessman (born 12 April 1954)

- Born: Philippe Harache; 12 April 1954 (age 72); Orbec, France
- Education: Aerospace engineer MBA; Senior Executive Programme; Advanced Management programme
- Alma mater: Institut polytechnique des sciences avancées Sorbonne Graduate Business School; INSEAD; Harvard Business School
- Occupation: Former deputy CEO of Eurocopter
- Successor: Christian Gras

Philippe Harache (born 12 April 1954, at Orbec) is a French aerospace engineer and businessman. He is the former deputy CEO of Eurocopter.

== Biography ==
A graduate of the Institut polytechnique des sciences avancées (1976), Sorbonne Graduate Business School, INSEAD and Harvard Business School, Philippe Harache started his career in 1978 at the Helicopter department of Aérospatiale. Then, he moved to Asia: Hong Kong in 1980, Singapore in 1982 where he was CEO of Samaero, a subsidiary of Aérospatiale. In 1992, he became chief of staff of the CEO of Eurocopter, and in 1993, deputy CEO of Eurocopter Holdings. In 1994, he was nominated CEO of Eurocopter International.

He became deputy CEO of Eurocopter in 2001. He retired in 2010 with the nomination of his successor, Christian Gras.

Since 2002, he was also foreign trade adviser to France.

== Bibliography ==
- Académie nationale de l'air et de l'espace and Lucien Robineau, Les français du ciel, dictionnaire historique, Le Cherche midi, June 2005, 782 p. (ISBN 2-7491-0415-7), Harache, Philippe

== Awards ==
- Official of the Order of Military Merit (Brazil)
- Chevaliers of the Légion d'honneur
