= Ruby McGregor-Smith =

British business executive and politician

The Right Honourable The Baroness McGregor-Smith CBE
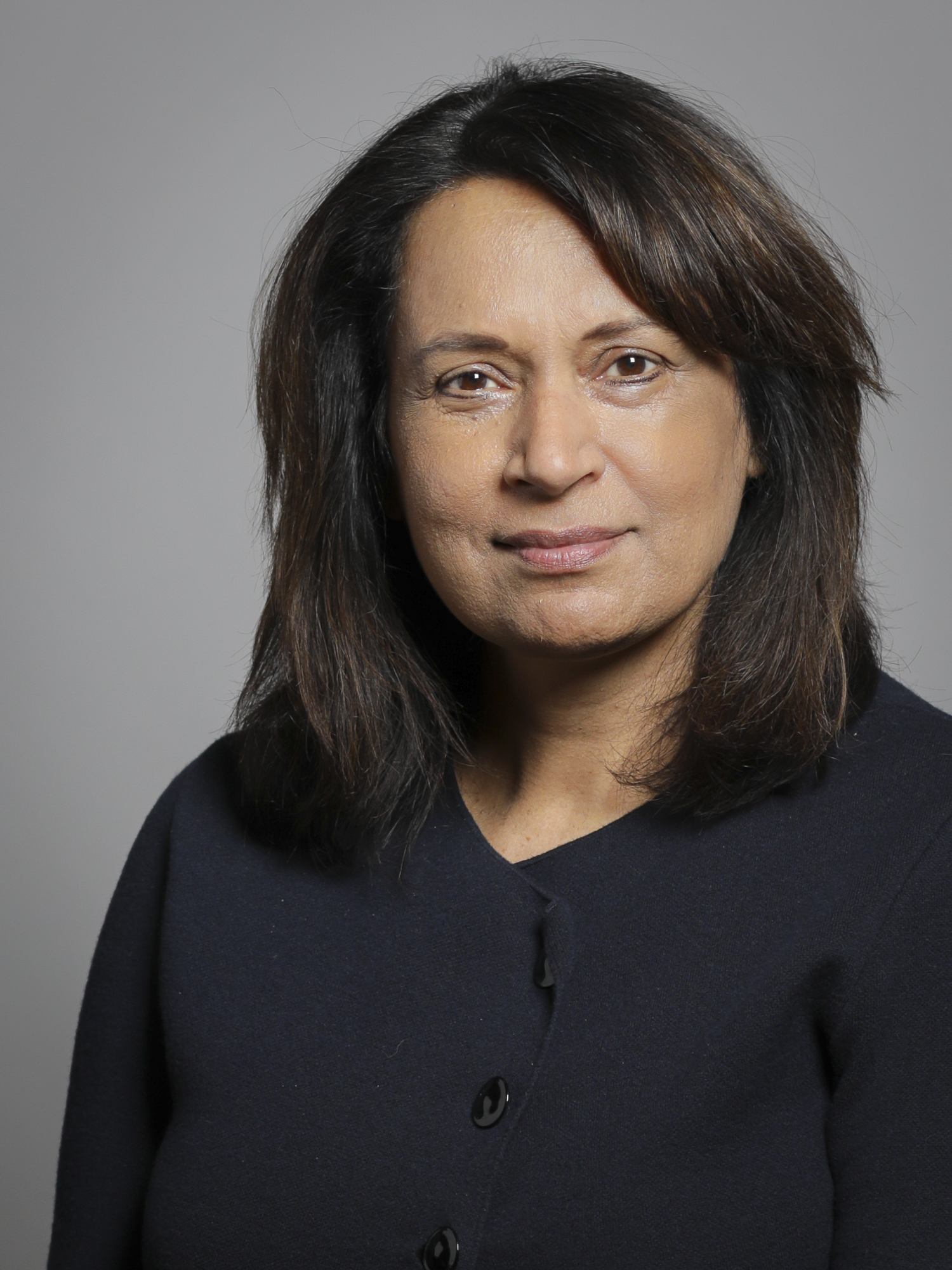
- Official portrait, 2019

CEO of Mitie Group PLC
- In office 2007–2017
- Preceded by: Ian Stewart
- Succeeded by: Phil Bentley

Member of the House of Lords
- Lord Temporal
- Life peerage 16 October 2015

Personal details
- Born: Ruby Ahmad; 22 February 1963 (age 63) Lucknow, India
- Party: Conservative
- Spouse: Graham McGregor-Smith
- Children: 2

Ruby McGregor-Smith, Baroness McGregor-Smith, CBE (née Ahmad; born 22 February 1963), is a British business executive and politician. McGregor-Smith was the former CEO of Mitie Group PLC, a UK facilities management business, from 2007 to 2016. She was nominated as a Conservative life peer in August 2015.

McGregor-Smith joined Mitie as group financial director in 2002 and was promoted to CEO in 2007. She was the only Asian female chief executive of a FTSE 250 company at this time. She was awarded a CBE in 2012 for services to business and promoting diversity. During the decade she spent at Mitie, the firm increased its turnover by £1.5bn billion, which passed the £2bn mark for the first time in 2012. In October 2016 a handover period with new CEO Phil Bentley began, ending in December 2016.

== Early life ==
McGregor-Smith was born in 1963 in Lucknow, Uttar Pradesh, in northern India.

She moved to England aged two with her mother, joining her father who was training as an accountant in London.

She grew up in Bayswater, White City and Stanmore in the London Borough of Harrow, attending Bentley Wood High School and Lowland Sixth Form College before graduating from Kingston Polytechnic in 1985 with a degree in economics.

== Political career ==
In January 2014, she was made a member of the Prime Minister's Holocaust Commission.

In February 2014 she was appointed a UK Business Ambassador for UKTI.

She was nominated as a Conservative life peer in August 2015 for services to British Business and took her seat in the House of Lords on 16 October 2015. In July 2017 she was appointed to the House of Lords EU Market Committee which looks at the impact of EU Regulation on business.

In December 2015, she was appointed non-executive board member of the Department for Education, a position she currently holds.

She was appointed by the then Business Secretary Sajid Javid, to voluntarily lead a review looking at the issues faced by businesses in developing black and minority ethnic (BME) talent from when they start work through to the executive level. Her report 'Race in the Workplace: The McGregor-Smith Review' was published in February 2017 and found that UK growth was being curtailed by £24bn due to poor practices. It has led to a step-change in action by the Department for Business, Energy and Industrial Strategy in this area.

She described herself as a 'reluctant remainer' and voted against the Conservative Party whip at Report Stage of the European Union (Withdrawal) Bill in support amendments on the EEA and Customs Union. However, after the Commons had considered these Lords Amendments and rejected them, she joined all but 21 Conservative peers and supported the Government and the European Union (Withdrawal) Bill at ping-pong.

On 18 July 2018 it was announced that McGregor-Smith was putting her name forward as the Conservative Party's candidate for Mayor of London. She came 4th out of ten candidates who were long-listed, narrowly missing out on being one of the three to be selected by the Conservative membership as the final candidate.

== Business career ==
Following university, McGregor-Smith trained for six years as an accountant at BDO Stoy Hayward. After qualifying, she joined Serco Group PLC in 1991, where she worked for nine years in a range of operational and financial roles.

=== Mitie Group ===
In 2002, after a brief spell at the facilities management firm Service Group International (SGI), McGregor-Smith joined Mitie Group PLC as group financial director. In 2005 she was promoted to group chief operating officer, and became CEO two years later when her predecessor Ian Stewart retired to take over the role of deputy chairman. As the first Asian female chief executive of a FTSE 250 company, the appointment received extensive press coverage.

Upon her appointment to the House of Lords in 2015, after eight years as Chief Executive, McGregor-Smith asked the Mitie board to begin the process of looking for a replacement as Chief Executive. In October 2016 a handover period with new CEO Phil Bentley began, ending in December 2016. She ceased to have any financial interest in Mitie on 17 August 2017.

McGregor-Smith's tenure as CEO initially saw Mitie's top and bottom lines grow, boosted by strong demand for integrated services, but ended with the issuing of a profit warning and a substantial drop in performance.

In May 2015 she appeared before senior officials at HMRC to discuss complaints that MiHomecare, a company owned by Mitie, was failing to pay its employees the minimum wage.

In September 2016 shares in Mitie plunged 26% to a four-year low after the company warned that profits would be "very significantly lower" due to "lower UK growth rates and public sector budget constraints". In common with much of the sector, Mitie faced pressures in 2016/17 and issued profits warnings.

In October 2016 McGregor-Smith announced that she was stepping down from the CEO role and would hand over to Phil Bentley, the former Cable & Wireless Communications (CWC) chief executive. Shares in the company closed 2.52pc higher as investors reacted positively to the news of Ms McGregor-Smith's departure.

Internal initiatives at Mitie in which McGregor-Smith has personal involvement include 'Mitie's Got Talent', a company-wide talent contest; and 'Mitie Millions', at which she and Finance Director Suzanne Baxter judge budding entrepreneurs with up to £5m to invest in the winners.

=== Post-Mitie career ===
She held a non-executive position on the board of recruitment firm Michael Page and currently holds a position as Senior Adviser to Mace Group Ltd and Chairperson of the facilities management outsourcing firm Q3 Services Group.

In July 2019, Prime Minister Theresa May appointed McGregor-Smith as Chair to the Office for Tackling Injustices (OfTI).

As of September 2019, McGregor-Smith was appointed as the Chair of the Airport Operators Association.

In 2021, McGregor-Smith was appointed as the new chair of the Institute for Apprenticeships and Technical Education.

In September 2022, McGregor-Smith was appointed as non-executive director at Everyman Media Group plc.

== Charitable and community interests ==
McGregor-Smith is a member of and past chairman of the Women's Business Council, a working group that seeks to maximize women's contribution to economic growth.

Her views on gender diversity in management have been widely reported in the mainstream media, specifically her opposition to positive discrimination in the form of quotas.

McGregor-Smith is a member of the WorldSkills UK Skills taskforce for global Britain.

== Awards and recognition ==
In 2007 McGregor-Smith was named First Woman of Business Services at the Real Business/CBI First Women Awards.

In 2008 she received the Business Women of the Year at the Asian Women of Achievement Awards.

In 2009, 2010 and 2011 she was ranked 32nd, 35th and 33rd in The Financial Times Top 50 Women in World Business. In the same year she was named Business Woman of the Year at the Women in Public Life Awards.

In 2011 she was named Woman of the Year at the Asian Achievers Awards. Also in 2011 she was named Orange Leader of the Year at the UK National Business Awards and Woman of the Year at the Asian Achievers Awards, and was awarded honorary doctorates from Kingston University and the University of the West of England.

In the 2012 New Year Honours McGregor-Smith was appointed a Commander of the Order of the British Empire (CBE) for services to business and diversity in business.

In February 2013, she was included in the BBC Radio 4 Woman's Hour 2013 Power List of the 100 most powerful women in the UK. As well, in April 2013 she was made non-executive director to the board of the Department for Culture, Media and Sport (DCMS). In November 2013, McGregor-Smith was made Chair of the Public Services Strategy Board for the CBI.

In August 2015, she was nominated to be a life peer in the UK House of Lords, and was created Baroness McGregor-Smith, of Sunninghill in the Royal County of Berkshire on 16 October 2015. She was dubbed the "prickly peer" because of her combative style during interactions with City Commentators.

In the same year she won the ICAEW Outstanding Achievement award.

In June 2016 she received the Lifetime Achievement Award at the First Women Awards 2016, and in July 2016 she received an Honorary Doctorate from Cranfield University for her outstanding contribution to the energy industry.

She is a member of the Women's Business Council, and its chairman from 2012 to 2016. In the House of Lords she is a member of the EU internal market subcommittee.

== Personal life ==
McGregor-Smith has been married to Graham McGregor-Smith, an accountant, since 1990. They have two children, a daughter and a son.
