= Empresaria Group =

Empresaria Group plc
- Company type: Public (LSE: EMR)
- Industry: Recruitment
- Founded: 1996
- Headquarters: Crawley, UK
- Area served: Worldwide
- Key people: Rhona Driggs (CEO), Penny Freer (Interim Chairman of the board)
- Services: Employment agencies, human resources services
- Revenue: £258.4 million
- Number of employees: 2,725
- Website: www.empresaria.com

Empresaria Group plc is a global specialist staffing group operating across 6 diversified sectors in 19 countries but supplying to many more. The group's sectors are Professional, IT, Healthcare, Property, Construction and Engineering, Commercial and Offshore Recruitment Services. Its services include Temporary and Contract Staffing, Permanent Placement, Executive Search, Offshore Recruitment Services (ORS) and Recruitment Process Outsourcing (RPO). The group's head office is in Crawley, UK.

== History ==
- 1996: Empresaria plc founded by Miles Hunt with David Telling as Chairman (founder of top 250 UK company, MITIE). Philosophy to target talented recruitment professionals to own and operate their own autonomous UK businesses.
- 1999: Empresaria Group plc is listed on Ofex. Private placing raised capital to continue building existing subsidiaries and invest in new UK company start-ups and acquisitions. Turnover £4.9 million.
- 2003: Growth in turnover reflects the changing focus on contract recruitment, as opposed to permanent recruitment, due to greater consistency of earnings.
- 2004: Implementation of Empresaria's strategy to diversify overseas with the appointment of Tony Martin (ex Chairman and CEO of Vedior NV) as Chairman. Empresaria's shares admitted to the Alternative Investment Market (AiM) of the London Stock Exchange.
- 2005: Additional non executive director, Penny Freer, appointed. Group turnover exceeds £50 million. Empresaria acquires a majority stake in Monroe Consulting Group in Southeast Asia.
- 2007: Group turnover of £148 million as international diversification drives growth. In particular the acquisition of Headway in Germany, EAR Group in the Netherlands and Alternattiva Group in Chile.
- 2008: Record results with turnover exceeding £200 million. Further international expansion includes China and Finland.
- 2009: Global economic problems lead to first year of declining turnover, but strength of diversified portfolio of operations and stability from temporary staffing focus leads to continued profit generation and reduction in net debt.
- 2019: Rhona Driggs was appointed as Chief Executive Officer in June 2019 having previously served as Chief Operating Officer since November 2018.
- 2022: Penny Freer appointed Interim Chair following the retirement of Tony Martin.

== Key figures ==
- Revenue (2021): £258.4 million
- Adjusted profit before tax (2021): £8.6m
- Employees worldwide (31 December 2021): 2,725
