= Premiership of Theresa May =

Period of the Government of the United Kingdom from 2016 to 2019

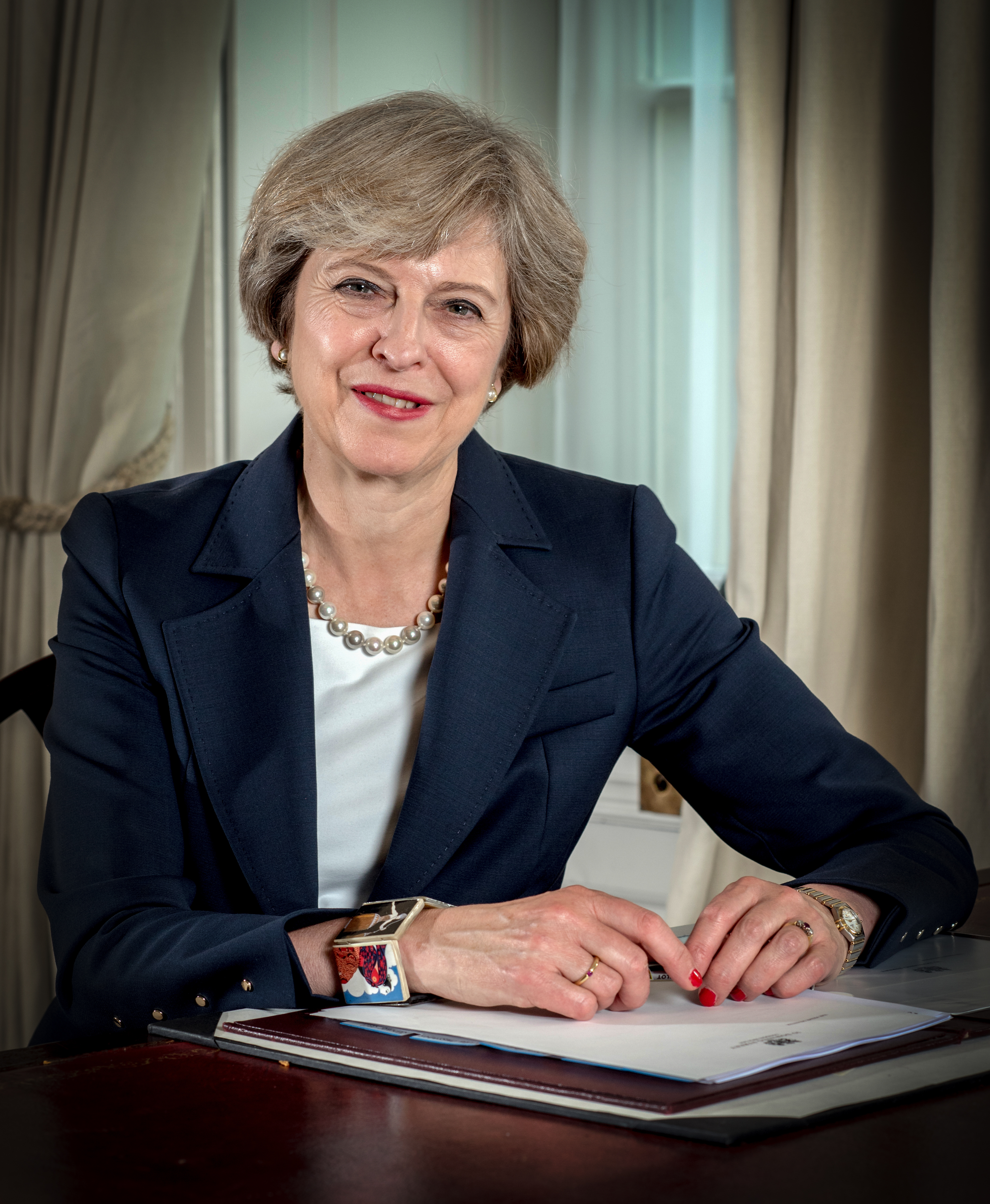
- Official portrait, 2016
- Premiership of Theresa May; 13 July 2016 – 24 July 2019
- Monarch: Elizabeth II
- Cabinet: First May ministry; Second May ministry
- Party: Conservative
- Election: 2017
- Seat: 10 Downing Street
- Coat of Arms of HM Government

Theresa May's tenure as Prime Minister of the United Kingdom began on 13 July 2016 when she accepted an invitation from Queen Elizabeth II to form a government, succeeding David Cameron, and ended on 24 July 2019 upon her resignation. May's premiership was dominated by Brexit, terrorist attacks in Westminster, the Manchester Arena and London Bridge, the Grenfell Tower fire, and the Salisbury poisonings. As prime minister, May also served simultaneously as First Lord of the Treasury, Minister for the Civil Service, and Leader of the Conservative Party.

May was elected unopposed after her opponent, Andrea Leadsom, withdrew from the final round of the 2016 leadership election; May became Conservative leader on 11 July 2016, and she became prime minister two days later. She began the process of withdrawing the UK from the European Union, triggering Article 50 in March 2017. The following month, she announced a snap general election, with the aims of strengthening her hand in Brexit negotiations and highlighting her "strong and stable" leadership. This resulted in a hung parliament in which the number of Conservative seats had fallen from 330 to 317, despite the party winning its highest vote share since 1983. The loss of an overall majority prompted her to enter a confidence and supply arrangement with the Democratic Unionist Party (DUP) of Northern Ireland to support a minority government.

May carried out the Brexit negotiations with the European Union, adhering to the Chequers Plan, which resulted in her draft Brexit withdrawal agreement. She also announced a £20 billion increase in funding to the National Health Service through the NHS Long Term Plan, established the first-ever Race Disparity Audit and launched a 25 Year Environment Plan, amending the Climate Change Act 2008 to end the UK's contribution to global warming by 2050. Unemployment in the United Kingdom fell to record lows, the lowest jobless rate since 1975. Her government also passed legislation cracking down on knife crime and giving extra powers to law enforcement and intelligence services to combat terrorism, published the 2017 Industrial Strategy White Paper and signed an immigration treaty with France to stem illegal border crossings in January 2018.

Although May did not succeed in getting much of her Brexit legislation through Parliament, her government was nevertheless responsible for passing the Great Repeal Act and for negotiating and approving the near-entirety of the UK's terms of exit from the EU. Three budgets were passed during her tenure: the first in March 2017, the second in November 2017 and the third and final in October 2018. May was also a prominent figure in leading the international condemnation and response to Russia over the Salisbury poisonings of Sergei and Yulia Skripal in March 2018. May survived two votes of no confidence in December 2018 and January 2019, but after versions of her draft withdrawal agreement were rejected by Parliament three times and her party's poor performance in the May 2019 European Parliament election, she left office on 24 July and was succeeded by Boris Johnson, her former Foreign Secretary. May is viewed unfavourably in historical rankings and public opinion of British prime ministers.

== Conservative leadership bid ==
In a referendum held on 23 June 2016, Britain voted to withdraw from the European Union, with a result of 52% for withdrawal and 48% for remaining within the union. David Cameron, who as prime minister had campaigned to remain within the European Union, announced on 24 June 2016, immediately following the announcement of the referendum results, that he would resign from his post. Following the first stages of the Conservative Party leadership election to succeed him, Home Secretary Theresa May's only remaining competitor, Andrea Leadsom, withdrew from the race on 11 July 2016. Following this announcement, Cameron said that he would step down from his post on 13 July. Cameron formally tendered his resignation to Queen Elizabeth II on that day, who subsequently appointed May as his successor. In her first speech as prime minister, May paid tribute to Cameron, saying "In David Cameron, I follow in the footsteps of a great, modern Prime Minister. Under David's leadership, the government stabilised the economy, reduced the budget deficit, and helped more people into work than ever before. But David's true legacy is not about the economy but about social justice. From the introduction of same-sex marriage, to taking people on low wages out of income tax altogether; David Cameron has led a one-nation government, and it is in that spirit that I also plan to lead."

== Early days ==
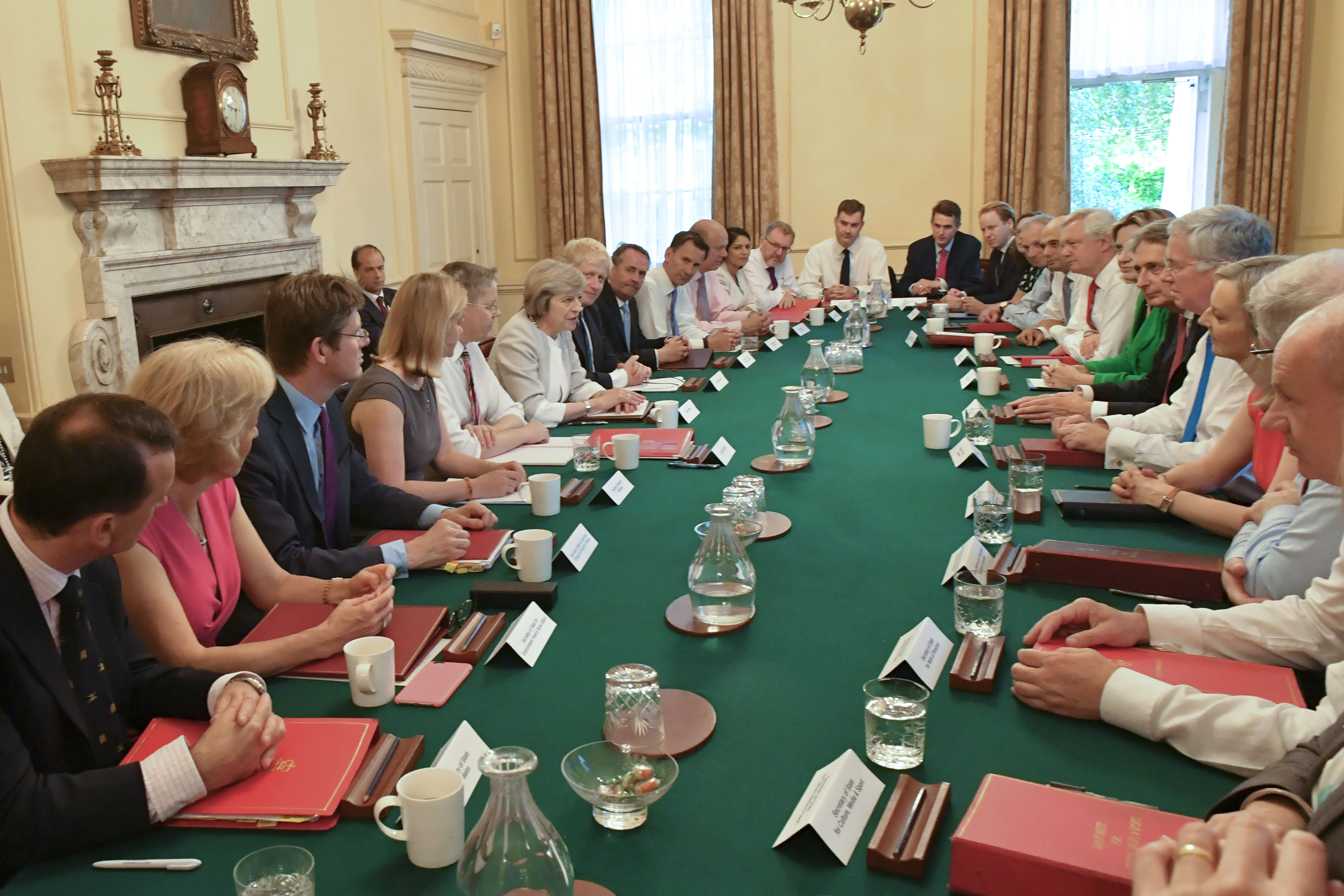
May chairing the first meeting of her cabinet.

When appointed by the Queen on 13 July 2016, May became the UK's second female prime minister, after Margaret Thatcher, and the nation's first female prime minister of the 21st century. She told the media on 11 July 2016 that she was "honoured and humbled" to ascend to the role.

Responding to some calls for a general election (reported by the news media) to confirm her mandate, "sources close to Mrs May" said there would be no such election, according to the BBC. In a speech after her appointment, May emphasised the term Unionist in the name of the Conservative Party, reminding all of "the precious, precious bond between England, Scotland, Wales and Northern Ireland." By 15 July 2016, May had travelled to Edinburgh, Scotland to meet with first minister Nicola Sturgeon, to reinforce the bond between Scotland and the rest of the country. "This visit to Scotland is my first as prime minister and I'm coming here to show my commitment to preserving this special union that has endured for centuries," she explained. After a meeting at Bute House, May offered the following comment about Scotland's role in the negotiations about the UK's exit from the EU: "I'm willing to listen to options and I've been very clear with the First Minister today that I want the Scottish government to be fully engaged in our discussion."

In August 2016, May launched an investigation aimed at identifying and reducing racism within public services.

As part of the government's plan to curb childhood obesity, May took steps to reduce sugar content of foods, though many experts criticised her as they felt that too little was being done. Notably there were widespread calls for curbing advertising of unhealthy foods to children and banning promotions of unhealthy food (such as multipacks and 'buy one, get one free') in supermarkets, restaurants, cafes and takeaways.

=== Health Service ===
Under May, consultation began over cost saving, streamlining and reduction of some services in the National Health Service (NHS). Critics feared cuts that could "put lives at risk" even though the review focused primarily on reducing costs. An article in The Guardian suggested possible benefits from the review but feared secrecy within the NHS was hindering effective public discussion. Liberal Democrat MP Norman Lamb accepted the review made sense in principle but stated: "While it is important that the NHS becomes more efficient and sustainable for future generations, redesign of care models will only get us so far – and no experts believe the Conservative doctrine that an extra £8 billion funding by 2020 will be anywhere near enough."

=== Grammar schools ===
In September 2016, May announced that she would end a ban on new grammar schools. A BBC article suggested grammar schools would be "dumbed down" while other secondary schools in the area would "suffer". Jon Coles of United Learning, which controls 60 schools was "unconvinced more grammar schools would raise standards". Poor children and children from families that are "just about managing" tend to miss out on grammar school places. None of the top ten nations with the best education have UK style grammar schools selecting at age 11. The Royal Society commissioned research from the Education Policy Institute which showed that disadvantaged pupils did worse overall in science and maths in regions with selective education. A cross party Select Committee of MPs described the issue of grammar school expansion as an "unnecessary distraction" and cast doubt on the claim grammar schools improve social mobility. Many speakers emphasised the need to tackle funding problems' effects on the whole of schooling. Following the outcome of the 2017 general election, May's grammar school policy was not included in the Queen's Speech, and was deemed unlikely to be pursued.

=== Child poverty ===
The Child Poverty Unit was merged with the Department for Work and Pensions leading to fears by some that child poverty would be less of a priority under May. This "ran counter" to May's pledge to "govern for everyone and fight the injustice of being born poor". A study said that from 2014 to 2015 28% of UK children were poor. The Child Poverty Action Group feared restricting the Child Poverty Unit to one department would reduce its effectiveness. The Institute for Fiscal Studies projected a 50% increase in child poverty by 2020 due to benefit cuts and 'sluggish wages'.

=== Ministerial appointments ===
May appointed new Cabinet members in "one of the most sweeping government reshuffles for decades", described by The Telegraph as "a brutal cull": several prominent members, including six of David Cameron's ministers, were removed from their posts. The early appointments were interpreted both as "centrist and conciliatory", an effort to reunite the party in the wake of the UK's vote to leave the European Union, and as "a shift to the right", according to The Guardian. Robert Peston of ITV News specifically labelled her new Cabinet as right wing.

May abolished the Department for Energy and Climate Change in a move widely criticised by Greenpeace which expressed concern the new government failed to see the threat from climate change, Friends of the Earth which said climate change "is happening now while the new government lowers its priority", and also by other more impartial peoples and groups. Climate change was included within the scope of the new Department for Business, Energy and Industrial Strategy.

Upon becoming prime minister, May appointed former mayor of London Boris Johnson as foreign secretary, former Secretary of State for Energy and Climate Change Amber Rudd as home secretary, and former shadow home secretary David Davis to the newly created office of Brexit secretary. Her choice of Johnson as Foreign Secretary "raised eyebrows", and drew some criticism from the press. Liam Fox and Philip Hammond, both of whom had previously served as Secretary of State for Defence (Fox from 2010 to 2011 and Hammond from 2011 to 2014), with Hammond having served as foreign secretary from 2014 to 2016, were appointed to the newly created office of International Trade Secretary, along with Chancellor of the Exchequer, respectively. Replacing Michael Gove, Liz Truss was made Justice Secretary, the "first female Lord Chancellor in the thousand-year history of the role". Andrea Leadsom, who was energy minister and May's primary competitor for party leader, was made the new Secretary of State for Environment, Food and Rural Affairs. However, former Northern Ireland Secretary Theresa Villiers resigned from Cabinet after May offered her a post which was "not one which I felt I could take on".

May jointly appointed Fiona Hill and Nick Timothy on 14 July as her Downing Street Chiefs of Staff. Both had been political advisers to her at the Home Office before both working outside the government for a brief period before working on her leadership campaign. The three ministers with new roles who worked to negotiate Brexit all espoused the Leave vote: David Davis, Liam Fox and Boris Johnson.

== Foreign trips ==
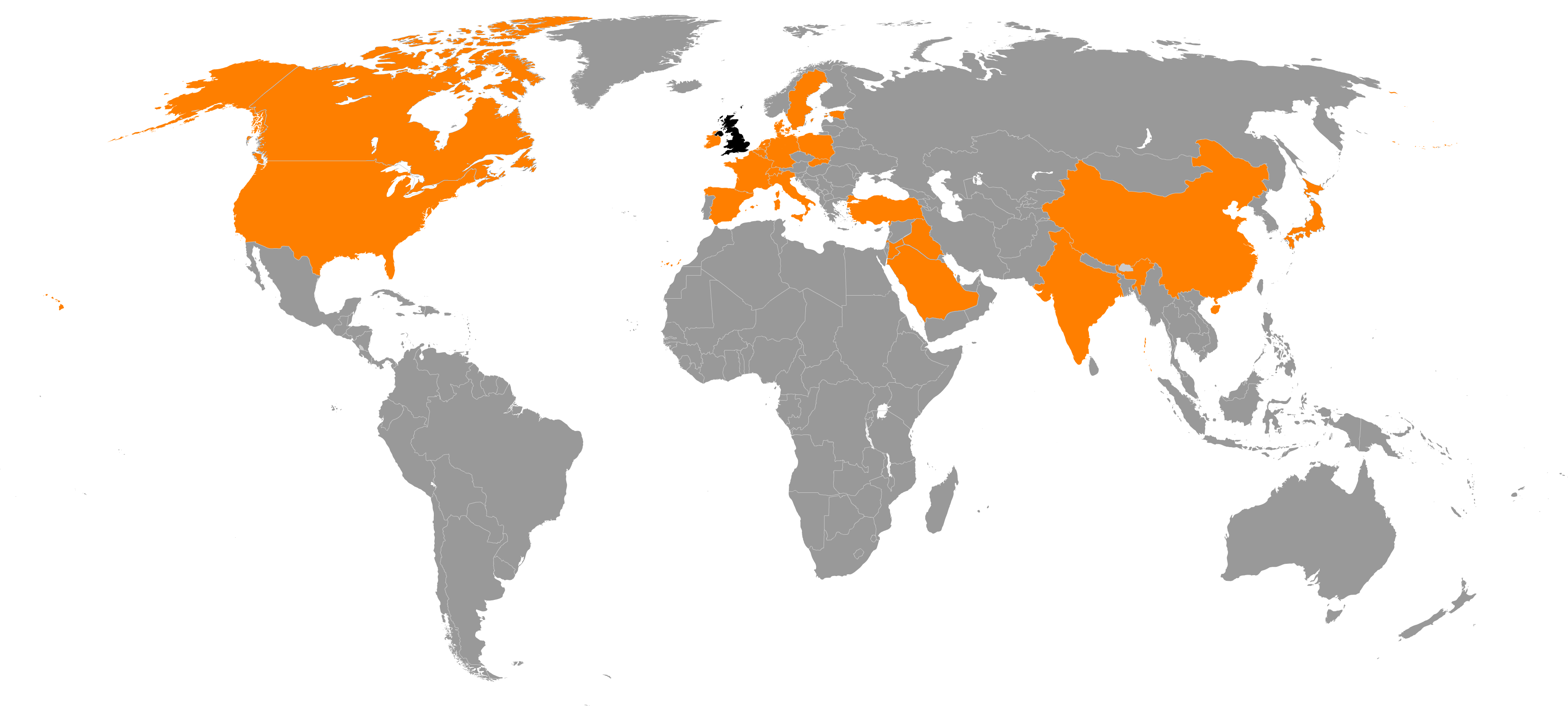
World map highlighting countries visited by Theresa May during her premiership

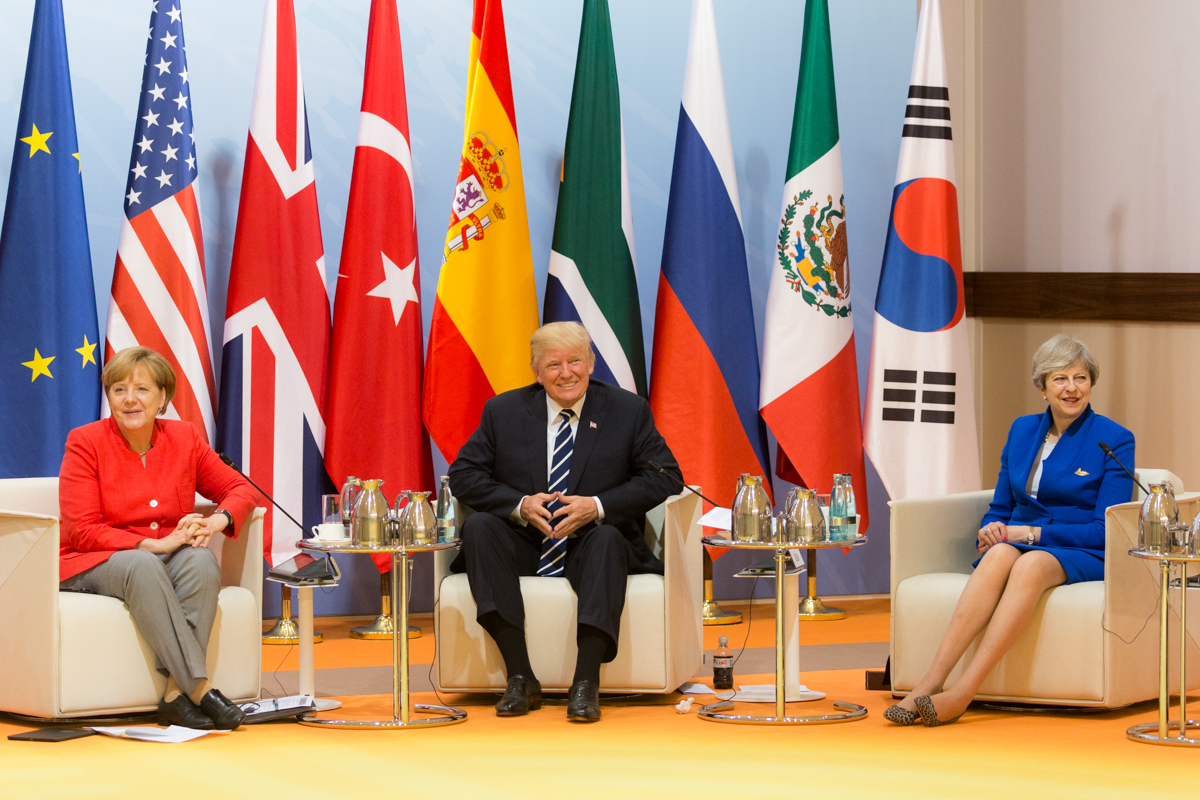
May with Angela Merkel and Donald Trump at the G20 Hamburg summit in July 2017

May made 72 trips to 33 countries during her premiership. The country she visited the most was Belgium, where she travelled 23 times, often for Brexit negotiations at the European Council and Commission. She took part in three UN GA summits, four G20 summits, three EU summits, two G7 summits, two NATO summits, and one CHOGM summit.

May addressing the World Economic Forum in 2017

On 20 July, May attended her first Prime Minister's Questions since taking office, then afterwards made her first overseas trip as prime minister, visiting Berlin for talks with German chancellor Angela Merkel. They discussed Germany–United Kingdom relations while the UK prepared for Brexit. During the visit, May said that she would not trigger Article 50 before 2017, suggesting it would take time for the UK to negotiate a "sensible and orderly departure" from the EU. May also announced that in the wake of the referendum, Britain would relinquish the presidency of the Council of the European Union that the UK had been scheduled to hold in the second half of 2017.

On 4 September, May attended the 2016 G20 Hangzhou summit, the first since the UK's withdrawal from the European Union. May sought to use the summit to emphasise her commitment to making the UK a "global leader in free trade" She also faced questions over the decision to delay planned Chinese investment in Hinkley Point C.

On 21 January 2017, following the inauguration of Donald Trump as US president, the White House announced that May would meet the president on 27 January, making her the first foreign leader to meet Trump since he took office on 20 January.

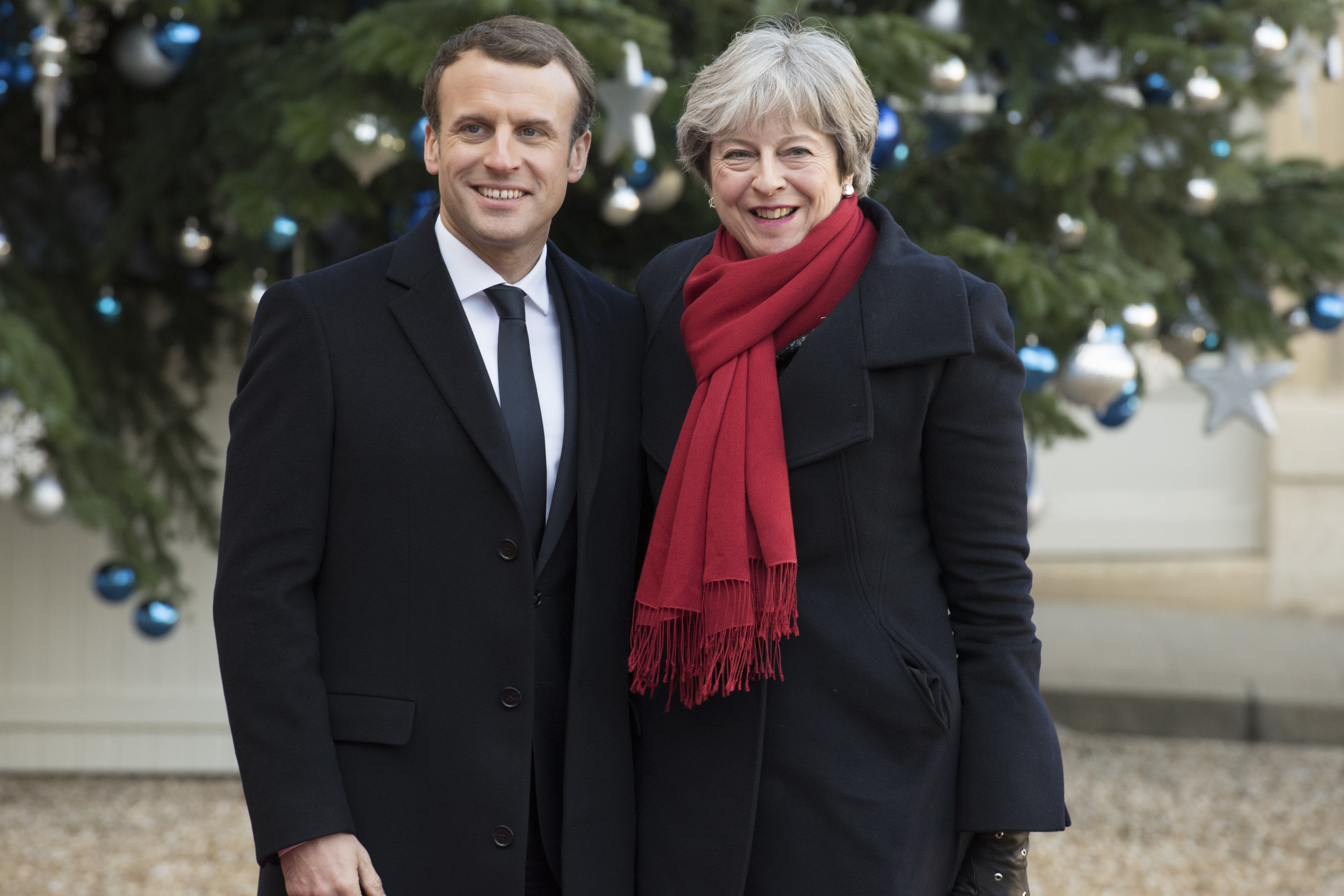
May with French president Emmanuel Macron in Paris on 12 December 2017

May attended the annual Munich Security Conference from 16 to 17 February 2018 where she urged European allies to agree to a new security treaty. Whilst in Germany she also held a meeting with Angela Merkel in Berlin.

== Incidents ==
=== Islamic extremist attacks ===
On 22 March 2017 a terrorist ploughed a car into pedestrians on Westminster Bridge, killing four people and injuring others, in an Islamic extremist attack. May, who was in the House of Commons for a vote at the time, was evacuated by her security team in the Prime Ministerial Car and taken to 10 Downing Street. She condemned the attack as "sick and depraved" in the night following it, and said "our resolve will never waver in the face of terrorism" in next day's morning session of Parliament.

On 22 May of the same year twenty-two people were killed when a suicide bomber detonated a homemade device laden with shrapnel in the lobby of the Manchester Arena at the end of a music concert with American singer Ariana Grande. Two-hundred people were injured in the attack, the worst on British soil since the 7 July 2005 London bombings. Following a COBRA meeting with Greater Manchester Police (GMP)'s Chief Constable Ian Hopkins on 23 May, May announced that the UK's terror threat level had been raised to "critical", and remained so until 27 May, when it was reduced to its previous level of severe. Within hours of the attack, information given confidentially to security services in the United States and France were leaked to the news media, leading to condemnation from Home Secretary Amber Rudd. On 25 May, GMP said it had stopped sharing information on the attack with the US intelligence services. May said she would make clear to US president Donald Trump that "intelligence that has been shared must be made secure." Trump described the leaks to the news media as "deeply troubling", and pledged to carry out a full investigation. May created the Commission for Countering Extremism in the aftermath of the bombing.

On 3 June, three terrorists drove a van into pedestrians on London Bridge before getting out and running into Borough Market. Eight people were killed, and armed police shot the attackers dead eight minutes after the first emergency calls were made.

=== Grenfell Tower fire ===
On 14 June 2017, a fire broke out in Grenfell Tower, a block of flats in West London, causing 72 deaths. The response to the disaster caused an image problem for May's government during its second term. May stated she would "always regret" not meeting the surviving residents of the tower in the immediate aftermath of the fire.

=== Salisbury nerve agent attack ===
On 4 March 2018, Sergei Skripal, a former Russian military officer, and his daughter Yulia Skripal were poisoned in a restaurant in Salisbury. Within days of the attack, political pressure began to mount on May and her government to take action against the perpetrators, and most politicians believed that the Russian government was behind the attack. Several days later May said the agent had been identified as one of the Novichok family of agents, believed to have been developed in the 1980s by the Soviet Union. She said Britain was to push for the EU to agree new sanctions against Russia, and spoke in the House of Commons on 12 March:

It is now clear that Mr Skripal and his daughter were poisoned with a military-grade nerve agent of a type developed by Russia. This is part of a group of nerve agents known as 'Novichok'. Based on the positive identification of this chemical agent by world-leading experts at the Defence Science and Technology Laboratory at Porton Down; our knowledge that Russia has previously produced this agent and would still be capable of doing so; Russia's record of conducting state-sponsored assassinations; and our assessment that Russia views some defectors as legitimate targets for assassinations; the Government has concluded that it is highly likely that Russia was responsible for the act against Sergei and Yulia Skripal. Mr Speaker, there are therefore only two plausible explanations for what happened in Salisbury on the 4th of March. Either this was a direct act by the Russian State against our country. Or the Russian government lost control of this potentially catastrophically damaging nerve agent and allowed it to get into the hands of others.

May said that the British government requested that Russia explain which of these two possibilities it was by the end of 13 March 2018. She also said: "The extra-judicial killing of terrorists and dissidents outside Russia were given legal sanction by the Russian Parliament in 2006. And of course Russia used radiological substances in its barbaric assault on Mr Litvinenko." She said that the UK government would "consider in detail the response from the Russian State" and in the event that there was no credible response, the government would "conclude that this action amounts to an unlawful use of force by the Russian State against the United Kingdom" and measures would follow. British media billed the statement as "Theresa May's ultimatum to Putin."

On 13 March, Home Secretary Amber Rudd ordered an inquiry by the police and security services into alleged Russian state involvement in 14 previous suspicious deaths of Russian exiles and businessmen in the UK. May unveiled a series of measures on 14 March 2018 in retaliation for the poisoning attack, after the Russian government refused to meet the UK's request for an account of the incident. One of the chief measures was the expulsion of 23 Russian diplomats which she presented as "actions to dismantle the Russian espionage network in the UK", as the diplomats had been identified as "undeclared intelligence agents".

Jeremy Corbyn cast doubt in his parliamentary response to May's statement concerning blaming the attack on Russia prior to the results of an independent investigation, which provoked criticism from some MPs, including members of his own party.

The UK's official assessment of the incident was supported by 28 other countries which responded similarly. Altogether, an unprecedented 153 Russian diplomats were expelled. Russia denied the accusations and responded similarly to the expulsions, "accusing Britain of the poisoning". On 5 September, British authorities identified two Russian nationals, using the names Alexander Petrov and Ruslan Boshirov, as suspected of the Skripals' poisoning, and alleged that they were active officers in Russian military intelligence.

May was widely praised for her handling of the nerve agent attack and it was considered to be one of the highest points of her premiership.

== 2017 general election ==
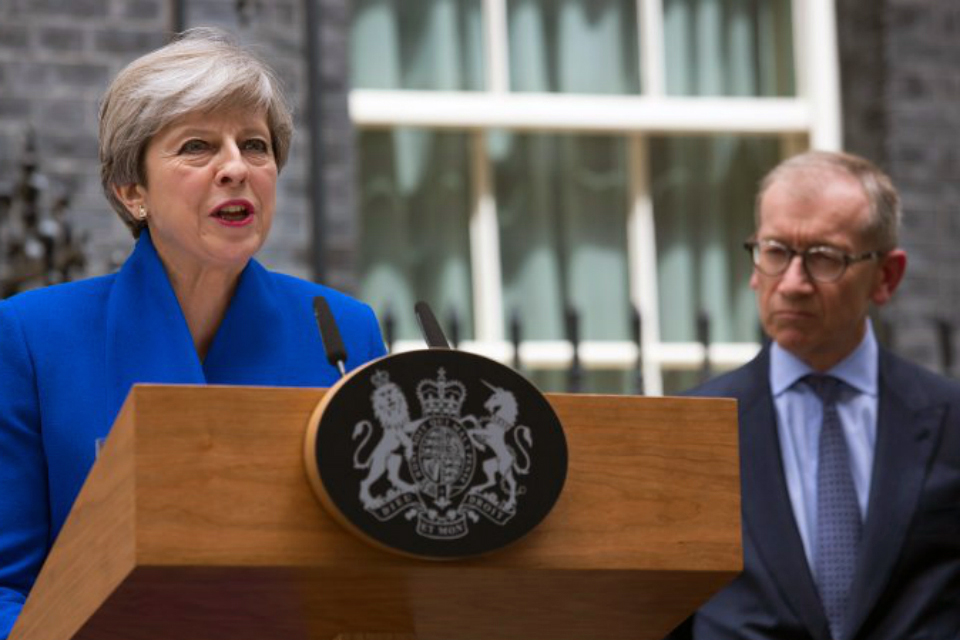
May giving her first statement upon returning to 10 Downing Street following the 2017 general election

On 18 April 2017, in a surprise statement made outside 10 Downing Street, May announced that she was to seek parliamentary approval for an early election. She explained that, following the country's decision in summer 2016 to leave the European Union, she had "only recently and reluctantly come to this conclusion" that although she had "said that there should be no election until 2020", that "the only way to guarantee certainty and stability for the years ahead is to hold this election and seek your support for the decisions I must take." May had previously indicated through a spokesperson she had no plan for a general election; the spokesperson stated "There isn't going to be one. It isn't going to happen. There is not going to be a general election." She denied there would be an election many times. On 19 April MPs gave May the two-thirds supermajority required to call the snap election she had asked for. MPs voted 522 in favour and 13 against, "giving the go-ahead" for the election to be held on 8 June 2017.

During an ITV News interview on the campaign trail, May said that the naughtiest thing she had ever done was running through fields of wheat as a child. The comment was the subject of sustained media commentary and became closely associated with May.

As of 9 June the Conservative Party had lost seats and Labour had gained seats. The Conservatives remained the largest single party but without an absolute majority. In the immediate aftermath of the election, it was unclear if May would continue as prime minister. She stated that she would have an informal understanding with the DUP to keep her party in government.

On 10 June 10 Downing Street issued a statement that a Conservative–DUP agreement was reached in principle. A few hours later, the statement was retracted when it was claimed that it had been "issued in error" and that talks between the Conservative Party and DUP were still ongoing.

On 11 June former chancellor of the exchequer, George Osborne, described May as a "dead woman walking".

== Second term developments ==
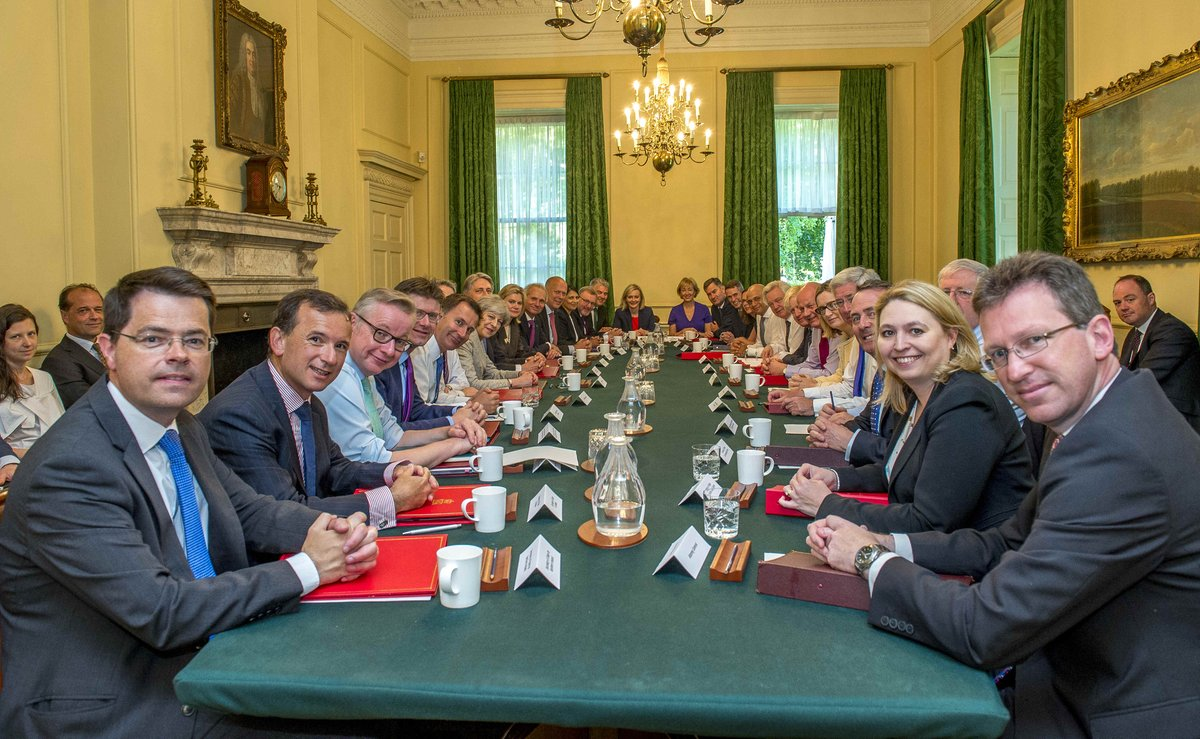
May attending her first cabinet meeting after the Conservative Party's victory at the 2017 general election

Potential candidates for a future general election were reluctant to put their names forward in the early days of May's second term. Suspected reasons at the time included being demoralised by May's premiership and lack of confidence that the Conservatives would win at the next election.

In July 2018, it was announced the British government was not planning to object to the United States seeking the death penalty for two suspected British members of ISIL, waiving Britain's long-standing objection to foreign executions.

On 28 February, May addressed a Jordan investment conference in Central London, speaking alongside Jordan's prime minister, Omar Razzaz. King Abdullah II was present at the conference, where May announced new economic support for Jordan.

On 7 March, May, along with the Duke and Duchess of Sussex, Duke and Duchess of Cambridge, Duchess of Cornwall, and Welsh First Minister Mark Drakeford, attended an event at Buckingham Palace which marked the 50th anniversary of the investiture of the Prince of Wales.

Also in 2018, a public consultation was held on the 2017 manifesto was a commitment to reforming the Gender Recognition Act 2004, but was not acted upon before May left office.

=== Social care reforms ===
While drafting the 2017 Conservative Party manifesto ahead of the snap election, it was widely reported that May had wished social care reform be a priority, in order to address much needed funding reforms and end the 'intergenerational unfairness' of existing models. The manifesto put forward proposals to raise the threshold for free care from £23,250 to £100,000, while including property in the means test and permitting deferred payment after death. These proposals were derided as a 'dementia tax', and the proposals dominated the media landscape until the London Bridge attack on 3 June 2017. In response to these criticisms, May announced that the proposals would form the basis of a wider consultation on wider social care funding, which drew criticisms of a 'u-turn'. After the election, journalist Tim Shipman argued that social care was the single issue that cost May her majority.

In March 2017, Chancellor Philip Hammond first announced a green paper on the future funding options for social care. Since the announcement, the green paper was marred by several delays, with the Health Secretary Matt Hancock giving evidence to select committees citing Brexit and lack of cross-party consensus as the reasons for the delay. Ultimately, the green paper never materialised during May's premiership.

A December 2019 poll by learning disabilities charity Hft found that 59% of social care providers in England believed that the situation in social care worsened under May's time in office, compared to just 3% who said it was slightly better.

=== Huawei 5G network row ===
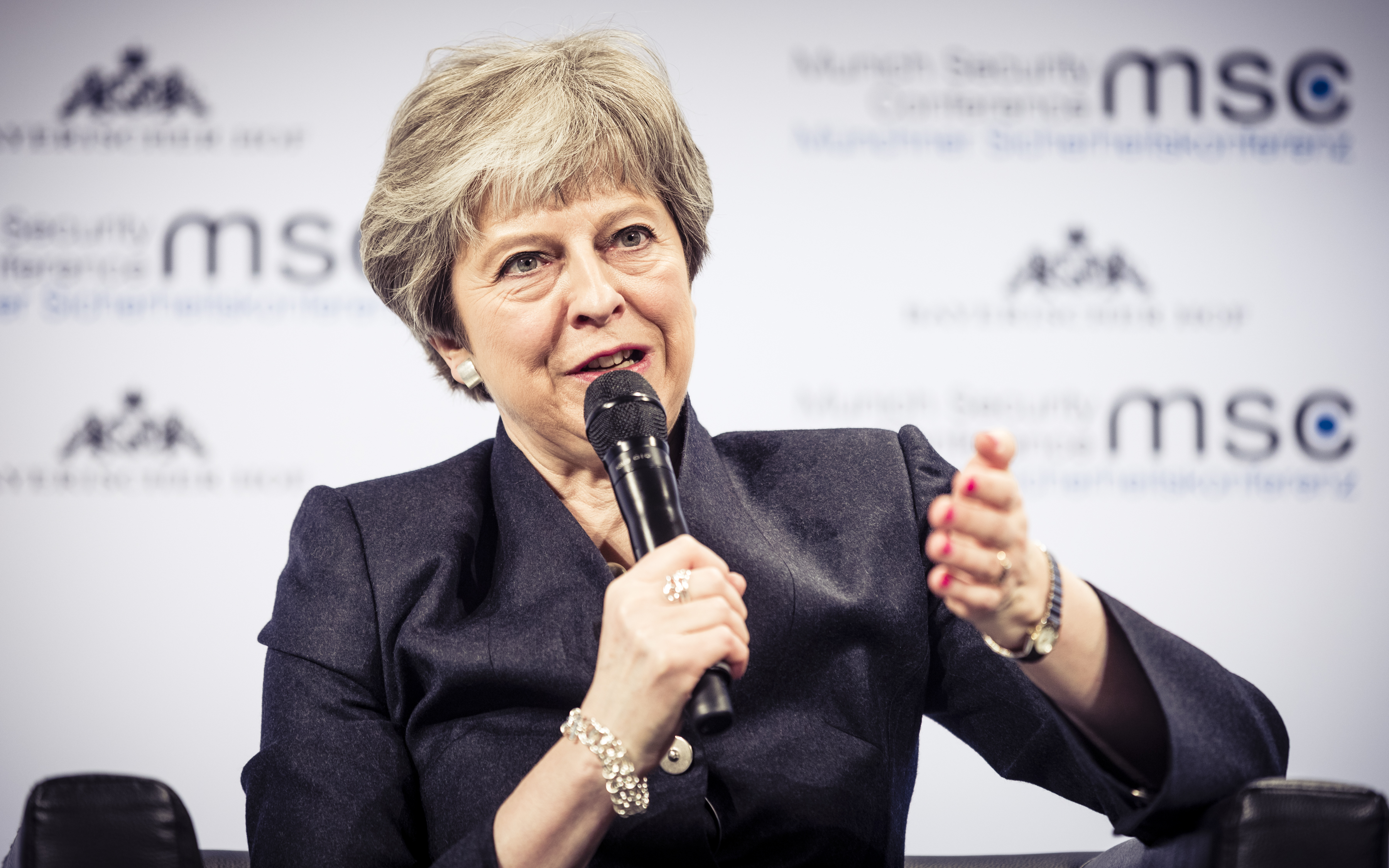
May at the 2018 Munich Security Conference

In April 2019, May approved the supply of equipment by the Chinese telecoms firm Huawei for the UK's upgrade to a 5G data network. The government went ahead with the decision despite the Five Eyes intelligence grouping – Canada, Australia, New Zealand and Britain – being urged by the United States to exclude the company, due to the rumoured risk of espionage or sabotage. Huawei has been denying claims it is controlled by the Chinese government. The former head of MI6, Sir Richard Dearlove, accused May of putting economic interests ahead of national security, saying the decision to allow Huawei to supply 5G technology was 'appalling' and presented a significant security risk.

The day after May's announcement, it was made public that the police were near to being called in on the Cabinet after an unauthorised disclosure surfaced regarding whether or not to let Huawei bid for sensitive 5G contracts. The Shadow Minister for the Cabinet Office called for the resignation of the minister who leaked the information, and May faced criticism for not calling in MI5 to investigate the leak. On 1 May 2019, May dismissed her Secretary of State for Defence, Gavin Williamson, saying she had "compelling evidence" he was responsible for the unauthorised disclosure. May said she had "lost confidence in his ability to serve", promoting former International Development Secretary Penny Mordaunt into his role. Williamson strenuously denied leaking the information.

== Brexit ==
May triggered Article 50 of the Treaty on European Union to leave the EU in March 2017. However, under her leadership, the government was unable to reach an EU withdrawal agreement approved by the Conservative Party as a whole. How to manage the border between Northern Ireland and the Republic of Ireland was a major problem; the so-called 'backstop'.

=== Events during withdrawal negotiations ===
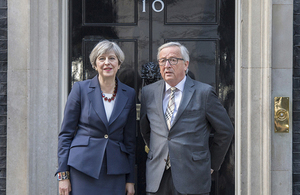
May with President of the European Commission Jean-Claude Juncker in London, 26 April 2017

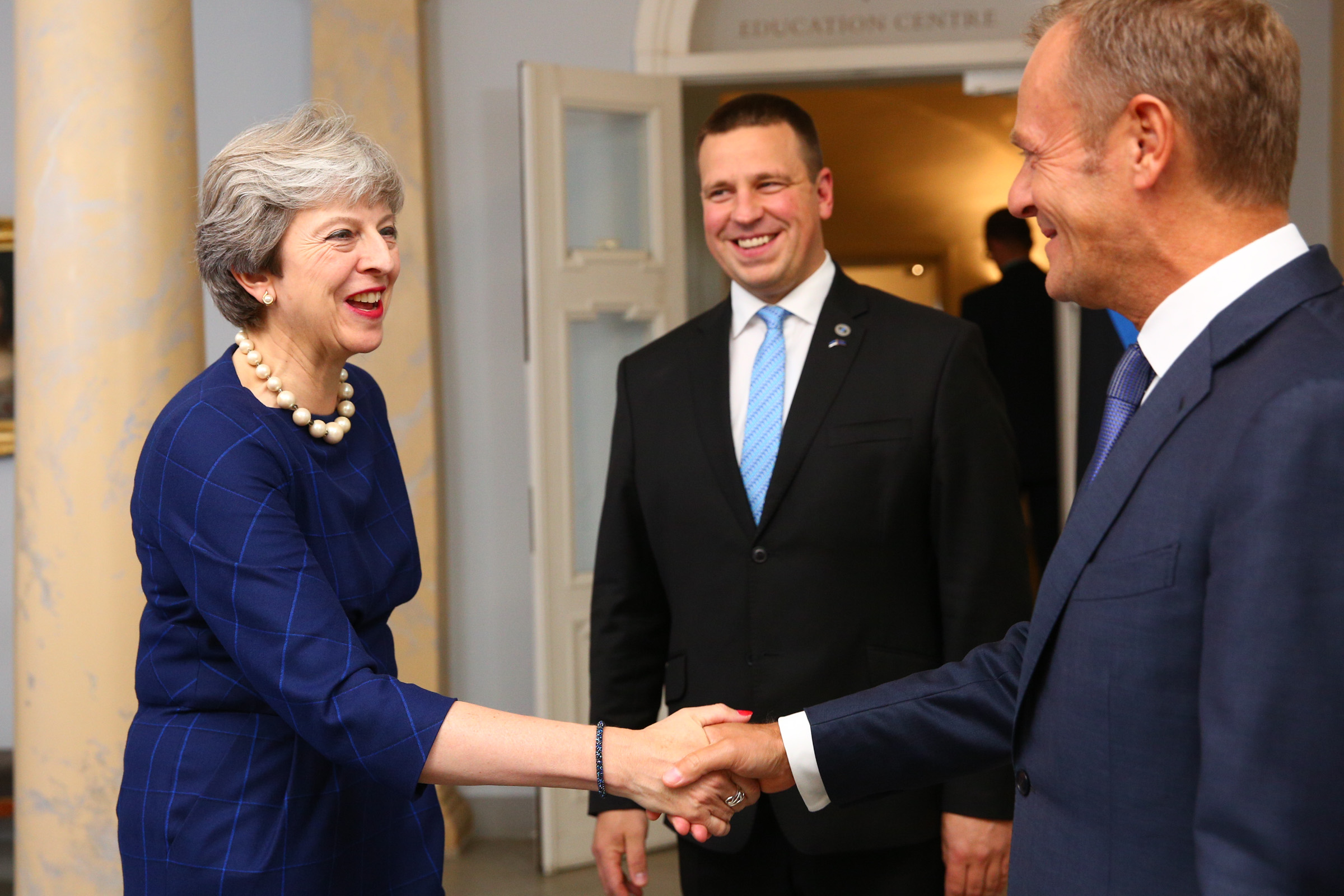
May greeting European Council President Donald Tusk in September 2017.

Following Cabinet agreement for May's proposals on Brexit, David Davis resigned from his government position on 8 July 2018. The day after, Steve Baker also resigned. It was later reported that May was beginning to face the threat of a leadership contest amid mounting anger from Brexiteers over her government's Brexit policy. Conservative Party backbencher Andrea Jenkyns called on for the prime minister to be replaced, saying "Theresa May's premiership is over". Boris Johnson resigned as Foreign Secretary on 9 July 2018.

=== Reactions to the withdrawal agreement ===
May's controversial draft withdrawal agreement received widespread criticism and at least 23 Conservative MPs proceeded to submit a letter demanding a vote of no confidence (a total of 48 letters from MPs were needed to trigger one). In addition to this, four ministers, including cabinet members Esther McVey and Brexit Secretary Dominic Raab, resigned over the deal. However, a poll of 505 Conservative councillors found that a majority wanted MPs to back the prime minister, although more were against the deal than for it.

On 4 December 2018, the May government was found in contempt of Parliament – the first government to be found in contempt in history – on a motion passed by MPs by 311 to 293 votes. The vote was triggered by the government failing to lay before Parliament any legal advice on the proposed withdrawal agreement on the terms of the UK's departure from the European Union, after a humble address for a return was unanimously agreed to by the House of Commons on 13 November 2018. The government then agreed to publish the full legal advice for Brexit that was given to the prime minister by the attorney general during negotiations with the European Union.

A House of Commons vote on May's deal was set to take place on 11 December 2018, but was delayed due to a lack of support for the deal. The following day, it was announced that May would face a vote of confidence in her leadership, after at least 48 Conservative MPs had submitted letters of no confidence to the chairman of the 1922 Committee, Sir Graham Brady. On the evening of 12 December, May won the vote by 200 votes to 117. She subsequently went to an EU summit to secure legal assurances over her Brexit deal, specifically over the controversial 'backstop'. European leaders however ruled out any renegotiation of the deal, but did not rule out assurances on the backstop's temporary nature. Theresa May said that she would not lead the Conservatives in the 2022 general election.

=== Parliamentary votes on the withdrawal agreement ===
On 15 January 2019, May's government was defeated in the House of Commons by a margin of 230 votes (202 in favour and 432 opposed) in the first 'meaningful vote' on her deal to leave the EU. It was the largest majority against a United Kingdom government in history. On 16 January, Parliament as a whole held a vote of no confidence in May and her government, which Jeremy Corbyn called a "zombie" government. It was the second no-confidence motion since 1925 after the 1979 vote against James Callaghan. The motion fell in May's favour by 19 votes (325 to 306).

On 14 February the same year, May suffered another Commons defeat after MPs voted by 303 to 258 – a majority of 45 – against a motion endorsing the government's Brexit negotiating strategy.

In February 2019, three Conservative MPs – Heidi Allen, Anna Soubry, and Sarah Wollaston – defected from the party to join The Independent Group, a pro-EU political association of MPs founded by seven former members of the Labour party. The MPs said the reasons for their departure were their opposition to the party's handling of Brexit, what they saw as the takeover of the Conservative party by 'right wing, ... hard-line anti-EU' MPs, and lack of concern from the Conservative party for the 'most vulnerable in society'.

May concentrated on convincing MPs to agree to leave the EU with her Brexit deal on the agreed date of 29 March 2019, despite some Conservative backbenchers proposing a two-month postponement. She was also vocally opposed to a second referendum on Brexit. On 24 February, May delayed the second 'meaningful' vote on the final Brexit deal until 12 March, a fortnight before the 29 March date. She faced further calls for her resignation. On 26 February, she said that she wanted to avoid a possible extension to the Article 50 period. She also spoke of the fact that she hoped MPs would get to vote on a "short, limited" delay to Brexit if they reject her deal and a no-deal exit from the EU.

On 28 February, the minister of state for agriculture, fisheries and food, George Eustice, resigned from May's government over her promise to allow MPs a vote on delaying Brexit if her Brexit deal were to be rejected. In his resignation letter, Eustice said "I fear that developments this week will lead to a sequence of events culminating in the EU dictating the terms of any extension requested and the final humiliation of our country."

On 12 March, May was again defeated in the House of Commons, on the second 'meaningful vote', this time by 149 votes (242 in favour and 391 against), on her latest Brexit deal after she secured last-minute concessions from the EU.

=== Delay to date of departure ===
The 22 March European Council Decision agreeing an extension until 12 April or 22 May.

The 5 April letter in which May requested postponement of the EU exit date to 30 June.

The 11 April European Council Decision agreeing an extension to 31 May or 31 October.

On 21 March an extension was agreed until 12 April, or 22 May, if MPs approved the Withdrawal Agreement. However, on 29 March MPs rejected the withdrawal agreement in the third 'meaningful vote', making the new departure date 12 April.

Later that month, May began asking the EU for a short extension of the two-year Brexit process until 30 June. European Council President Donald Tusk said he believed the EU would agree to a short extension, but this would only be if May's deal was supported by UK MPs, and not in the case of a no-deal Brexit.

On 5 April May wrote to Donald Tusk requesting a second extension until 30 June. On 11 April, the EU agreed to an extension until 31 May if the UK failed to hold European Parliament elections, or an extension to 31 October if it did. May accepted the 31 October date, after previously saying said she would not accept an extension beyond 30 June. The new withdrawal date postponed the risk of the UK "crashing out" of the EU without a deal. From the Labour benches, Shadow Brexit Secretary Sir Keir Starmer called May's delay "a good thing", saying businesses would be "relieved", and "Negotiations are in good faith. We all feel a deep sense of duty to break the impasse. But there's also this question of how on Earth do we ensure that anything this Prime Minister promises is actually delivered in the future because of course she's already said she's going to step down, probably within months."

Talks between Labour and the government aimed at breaking the Brexit impasse ended without agreement on 17 May. May promised to set a timetable for her departure from office if she lost the parliamentary vote on her EU withdrawal agreement bill in the week beginning 3 June. The chairman of the 1922 committee, Sir Graham Brady, said he had reached an agreement over the prime minister's future during "very frank" talks in Parliament. He confirmed that the committee's executive and May would meet again to discuss her future following the first debate.

The Leader of the House of Commons, Andrea Leadsom, resigned from May's cabinet with a "heavy heart" on the eve of the 23 May 2019 European election, saying she could no longer back the government's Brexit plan.

== Final months in office ==
=== Announcement of resignation ===
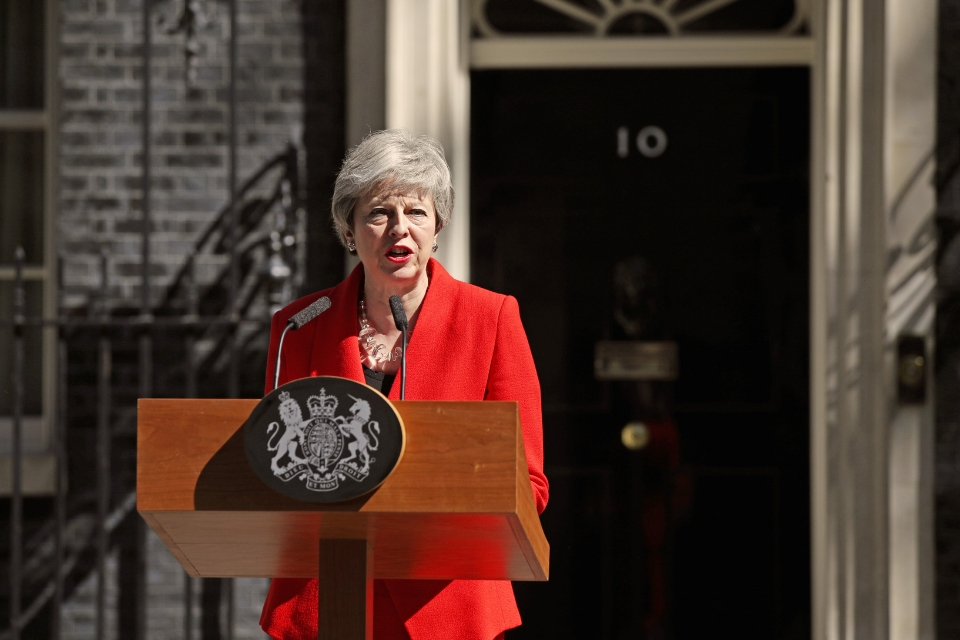
May announces her resignation outside 10 Downing Street on 24 May 2019; she left office on 24 July.

On 27 March 2019 at a meeting of the 1922 Committee, May confirmed that she would "not lead the UK in the next stage of Brexit negotiations", meaning she was expected to resign after the third meaningful vote, if it had passed successfully. However, no date was stated, and her reported wording was ambiguous and thus carried no binding force. On 29 March, the third meaningful vote was defeated, and while May did not state anything in regard to standing down, Corbyn stated that if May could not find an alternative to her deal "she must go, not at an indeterminate date in the future but now."

On 22 April it was announced that the leaders of 70 Conservative Associations had signed a petition calling for a vote of no confidence. Under party rules an Extraordinary General Meeting must be convened if one is demanded by 65 associations. The non-binding vote, to be determined by 800 of the party's senior officials, would be the first time such an instance had occurred. On 24 April, the party's 1922 Committee ruled out changing the leadership challenge rules, but its chair, Graham Brady, asked for clarity on when May would step down from office.

In the 23 May European Parliament election, the Conservative Party lost 15 seats in the European Parliament (placing them fifth, behind the Brexit Party, Liberal Democrats, Labour Party and Green Party), achieved a 9% vote share, and nursed what many called the worst nationwide election result in their 185-year history. The next day, May announced that she would resign as leader of the Conservative and Unionist Party effective 7 June 2019, remaining leader for Donald Trump's state visit. She stated, "it is now clear to me that it is in the best interests of the country for a new prime minister to lead that effort [Brexit]."

==== Reaction ====
Jeremy Corbyn
(@jeremycorbyn)
tweeted:

Theresa May is right to resign. She's now accepted what the country's known for months: she can't govern, and nor can her divided and disintegrated party.
Whoever becomes the new Tory leader must let the people decide our country's future, through an immediate General Election.

24 May 2019

Conservative MPs Liam Fox, Jeremy Hunt, Michael Gove, Steve Baker, Andrea Leadsom, Julian Smith, Dominic Raab, Boris Johnson, Matt Hancock, Sajid Javid and Philip Hammond were among those paying tribute to May after her resignation announcement.

Leader of the Opposition Jeremy Corbyn tweeted that it was "right" for May to have left her post, and used the opportunity to call for an early general election. He later said he could understand the "stress" May was going through. Deputy Labour leader Tom Watson said that May had an "unenviably difficult job" and deemed that "she did it badly."

Liberal Democrat leader Sir Vince Cable responded with a similar message to Labour, saying "she [May] was right to recognise that her administration had reached the end of the road."

The European Commission said that President Jean-Claude Juncker lauded May as "a woman of courage," and that he viewed her resignation "without personal joy."

=== Donald Trump state visit ===
May was strongly criticised in the United Kingdom by members of all major parties, including her own, for refusing to condemn Donald Trump's Executive Order 13769 (colloquially known as the "Muslim ban") as well as for inviting Trump to a state visit with Queen Elizabeth II. More than 1.8 million signed an official parliamentary e-petition which said that "Donald Trump's well documented misogyny and vulgarity disqualifies him from being received by Her Majesty the Queen or the Prince of Wales," and Labour leader Jeremy Corbyn said in Prime Minister's Questions (PMQs) that Trump should not be welcomed to Britain "while he abuses our shared values with his shameful Muslim ban and attacks on refugees' and women's rights" and said that Trump should be banned from the UK until the bar on Muslims entering the US is lifted. Baroness Warsi, former chair of the Conservatives, accused May of "bowing down" to Trump, who she described as "a man who has no respect for women, disdain for minorities, little value for LGBT communities, no compassion clearly for the vulnerable and whose policies are rooted in divisive rhetoric." London Mayor Sadiq Khan and the Conservative leader in Scotland, Ruth Davidson, also called for the visit to be cancelled. In a statement, Corbyn said, "Theresa May should not be rolling out the red carpet for a state visit to honour a president who rips up vital international treaties, backs climate change denial and uses racist and misogynist rhetoric. Maintaining an important relationship with the United States does not require the pomp and ceremony of a state visit. It is disappointing that the Prime Minister has again opted to kowtow to this US administration." He confirmed he was intending to boycott the state banquet at Buckingham Palace in honour of President Trump.

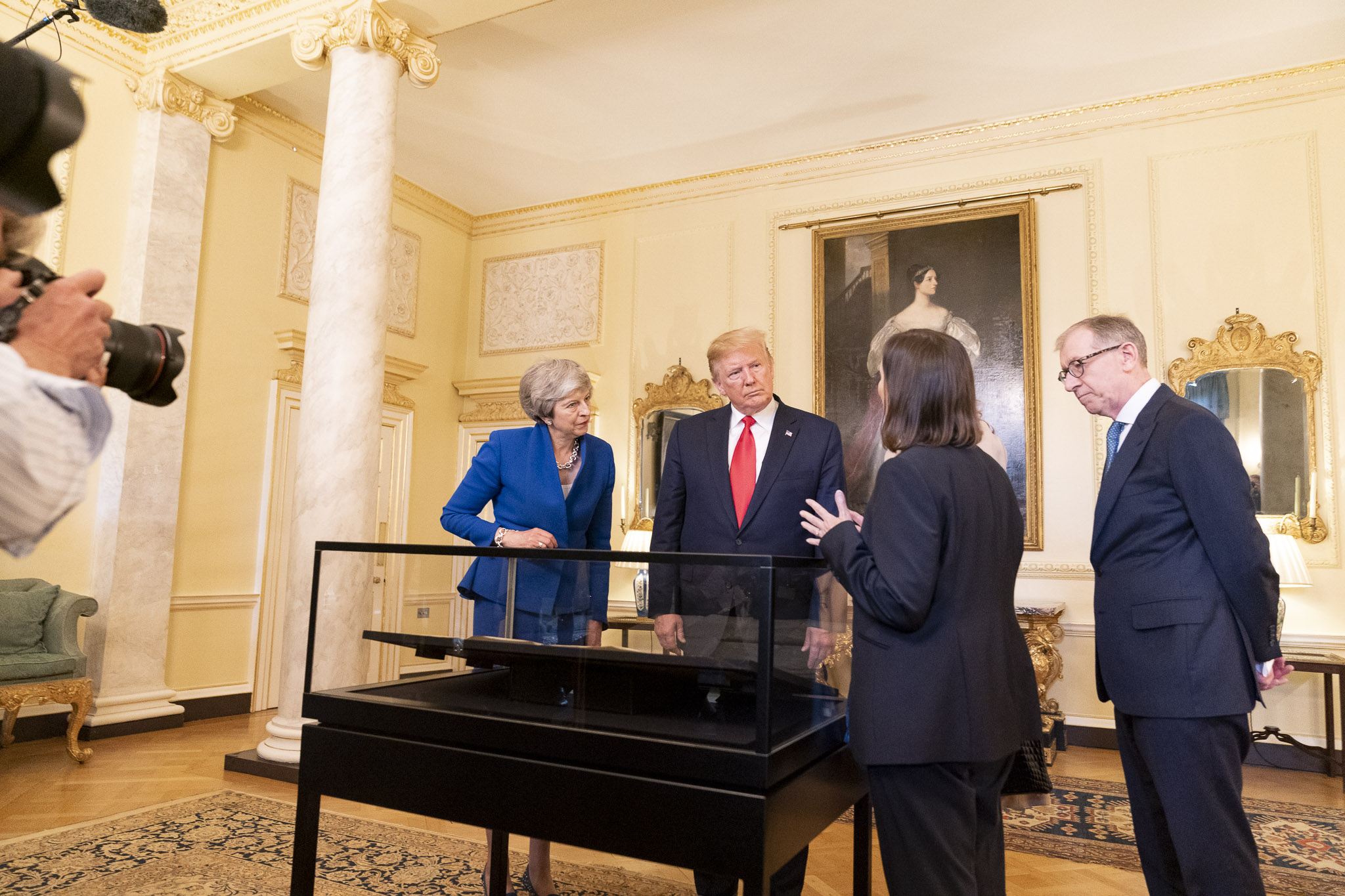
Trump and May viewed a copy of the American Declaration of Independence inside Downing Street

Trump, along with First Lady Melania Trump, their adult children, and a number of members of his administration, landed at London Stansted Airport on 3 June 2019 to begin their three-day state visit. They were greeted at the airport by the United States Ambassador to the United Kingdom Woody Johnson and Foreign Secretary Jeremy Hunt. That day he met the Queen, Prince Charles and other members of the Royal Family at Buckingham Palace, and in the evening, paid tribute to the Queen in a state banquet with May.

The next day, Trump and May partook in a breakfast meeting of British and American business leaders, with the intention to boost trade links between the two countries. Mr and Mrs Trump then arrived at Downing Street in the vehicle Cadillac One, and were shown a copy of the American Declaration of Independence inside Downing Street. During this same time, Jeremy Corbyn spoke at a rally against the state visit, in nearby Trafalgar Square. At a joint press conference at the Foreign and Commonwealth Office with May, Trump said he had turned down a request from Corbyn to meet during the visit. A Labour spokesman said Corbyn remained "ready to engage with the president on a range of issues, including the climate emergency, threats to peace and the refugee crisis." Trump said that the United States and United Kingdom have the "greatest alliance the world has ever known", promising a "phenomenal" trade deal after the UK leaves the EU, and adding that "everything is on the table" – including the NHS.

News agencies reported that Trump seemed to spend more time with Conservative leadership contenders on the visit than he did with May, holding a private meeting with Hunt on Tuesday night, speaking to Michael Gove at the state banquet and having a 20-minute phone call with Boris Johnson. He also met Nigel Farage, May's former European election rival from the Brexit Party.

==== D-Day 75th anniversary ====
On the third day of the state visit, Trump and May travelled to Portsmouth to attend the 75th D-Day anniversary commemorative ceremonies. Members of the armed forces and more than 300 veterans attended the event, which included a flypast of the Red Arrows. May hosted a total of 15 world leaders and used the occasion to call for continued Western unity in tackling what she called "new and evolving security threats." The last time outside a formal summit that Britain had hosted the multitude of international political figures seen in Portsmouth was during the 2012 Olympics under David Cameron.

=== Caretaker Prime Minister ===
The Conservative Party fell to third place in the 6 June 2019 Peterborough by-election, behind winners Labour and the Brexit Party in second place, in what was historically a Conservative-Labour marginal seat. May remained as 'caretaker' Prime Minister, awaiting the election of a successor by the Conservative Party membership in the 2019 leadership election. The winner of the contest was declared on 23 July to be Boris Johnson MP.

On 10 June, the BBC announced that it would end free TV licences for most of its consumers over the age of 75, by June 2020. May said she was "very disappointed" with the BBC's decision and urged the corporation to rethink its budgeting plan.

On 12 June, May announced the terms of a new government strategy to tackle climate change, pledging Britain to cut greenhouse gas emissions to a net zero figure by 2050. This followed the Committee on Climate Change's report in May, which said that the net zero figure is reachable by that date at no added cost from previous estimates.

In Prime Minister's Questions on 17 June, May said that she would remain as MP for Maidenhead after stepping down as prime minister. She said she was "looking forward" to "devoting her full time" to her Maidenhead constituency.

At the G20 Osaka summit, May attended a bilateral meeting with Russian president Vladimir Putin and berated the Salisbury nerve agent attack as a "despicable act". She further confronted Putin over a "wider pattern of unacceptable behaviour".

On 12 July, May created a new body, the Office for Tackling Injustices, to monitor government efforts to tackle "deep-seated societal injustice" and to use data to "provide the catalyst" for better policies.

== International prime ministerial trips ==
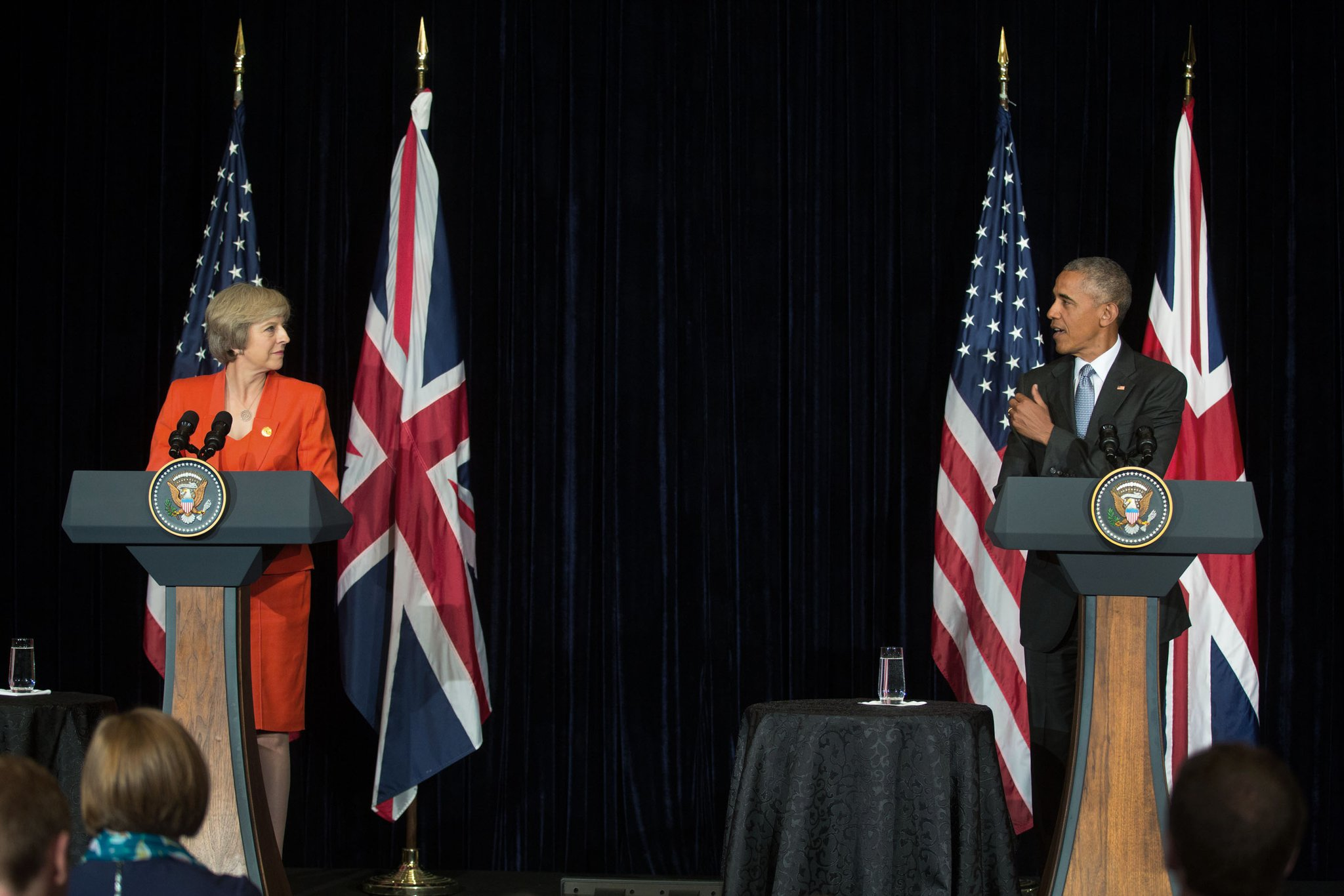
May with President Barack Obama in Hangzhou, China in 2016

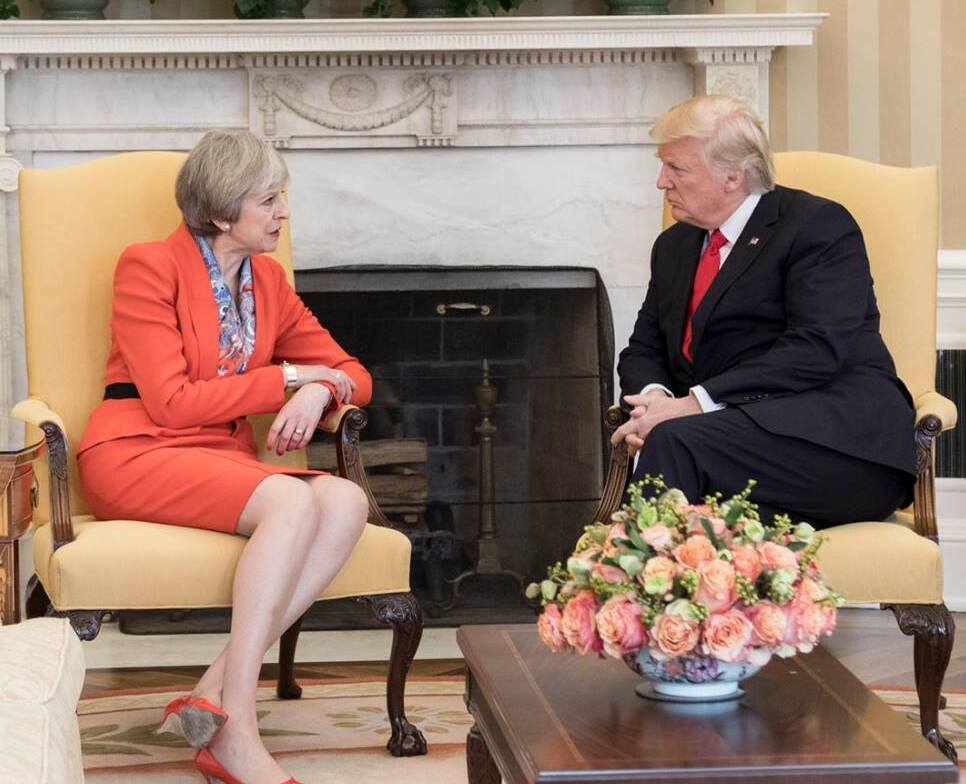
May with President Donald Trump at the White House Oval Office in 2017

May made 77 international trips to 33 countries and one British Overseas Territory during her premiership. The number of visits per country:

- One visit to Argentina, Bahrain, Bulgaria, Estonia, Egypt, India, Iraq, Kenya, North Macedonia, Malta, Nigeria, Norway, Slovakia, South Africa, Spain, and Turkey
- Two visits to Austria, Canada, China, Denmark, Ireland, Japan, Jordan, Saudi Arabia, and Sweden
- Three visits to Netherlands, Poland, and Switzerland
- Four visits to Italy, and the United States
- Nine visits to Germany
- Ten visits to France
- Twenty-seven visits to Belgium

== See also ==
- 2010s in United Kingdom political history
- Politics of the United Kingdom

British premierships
Preceded by Cameron	May premiership 2016–2019	Succeeded by Johnson
