= OCS Group =

Facilities management company

- Industry: Facilities management
- Founded: 1900; 126 years ago
- Headquarters: Ipswich, Suffolk
- Key people: Peter Armitage (Chairman); Rob Legge (CEO)
- Revenue: ▲£2,658.6 million (2025)
- Operating income: ▲£135.2 million (2025)
- Net income: ▲£(141.3) million (2025)
- Number of employees: 130,000 (2026)
- Website: ocs.com/uk/

OCS Group is a large multinational facilities management business based in Ipswich, UK.

== History ==
The company was founded by Frederick William Goodliffe as The New Century Window and General Cleaning Company in 1900. It became Office Cleaning Services ('OCS') in 1930 and expanded quickly from the late 20th century, under the leadership of the chief executive, Chris Cracknell, who was appointed CEO in 1996.

In 2005, the company became the sponsor of a newly-completed stand at the Vauxhall end of The Oval cricket ground.

In August 2010, OCS Group acquired Legion Group, a security business which had been spun out of the Royal British Legion. In 2012, the company, still owned by the Goodliffe family, was awarded the title of "Family Business of the Year" at the Private Business Awards 2012. Cracknell was succeeded by Peter Slator in January 2016.

After the company was acquired by Clayton, Dubilier & Rice in July 2022, OCS Group merged with Atalian Servest, which Clayton, Dubilier & Rice had also purchased. Following the merger, Rob Legge became CEO.

In December 2025, the company bought the UK operations of Emcor for £190 million.

In July 2026, the company made an offer worth £3.1bn to acquire the facilities management business Mitie. The deal, if concluded in early 2027 (subject to shareholder and national security approvals and Competition and Markets Authority clearance), would create one of the UK's biggest outsourced services groups with combined annual revenues of around £8.5bn and a global workforce of 219,000 people.
