= David Telling =

David Malcolm Telling was the founder of MITIE Group, which is now one of the United Kingdom's largest facilities management companies. Born in Harrow, North London on 12 August 1938 and brought up in Cleeve in Somerset, David Telling was educated at Cheltenham College. He died on 31 October 2003, aged 65.

== Career ==
Telling was required to undertake National Service and was commissioned into the King's Own Scottish Borderers in December 1957. He guarded Rudolf Hess at Spandau Prison and saw active service during the Malayan Emergency.

Following his national service Telling went on to train as accountant. After managing the London based business Veronese, Telling went on to join the HAT Group, a building services business founded by his father, Albert Telling. David Telling became Managing Director of HAT Group in 1976 and Chairman in 1984. He expanded the business until it was the largest painting concern in the world. In 1986, following a hostile bid, the company was acquired by BET.

In 1987 he established MITIE Group, a business which works on the basis of allowing managers to convert shares in start-up concerns into shares in MITIE Group itself. He was the founding chairman of Empresaria Group, which was established in 1996.

Following a stay in hospital himself, he established the David Telling Charitable Trust to support medical research in the Bristol area.

== Family ==
In 1964 he married Jane Piggott and together they have two daughters, Louise and Susy.
