= Airport Operators Association =

Organization

- Abbreviation: AOA
- Formation: 1934
- Legal status: Non-profit company
- Purpose: Airports in the UK
- Location(s): Birdcage Walk; London, SW1; United Kingdom
- Region served: UK
- Members: UK airport operators (50+ airports)
- Chief Executive: Karen Dee
- Board Chair: Baroness McGregor-Smith
- Main organ: AOA Board
- Website: Aoa.org.uk

The Airport Operators Association (AOA) is a trade association that advocates on behalf of UK airports, negotiating with the UK Government and regulatory authorities to pursue policy outcomes. It has advocated for policies including an end to increases in the Air Passenger Duty.

The AOA was formed in 1934 as the Aerodrome Owners' Association. On 17 April 1990 it was renamed the Airport Operators Association. It represents over 50 airports, and around 160 companies and organizations which do not own airports but operate in the aviation industry.
