= Phil Bentley =

British businessman

- Born: Phillip Keague Bentley; 14 January 1959 (age 67); Bradford, England
- Education: Woodhouse Grove School
- Alma mater: Pembroke College, Oxford; INSEAD
- Occupation: Businessman
- Title: CEO, Mitie
- Term: 2016–
- Predecessor: Ruby McGregor-Smith
- Children: 2

Phillip Keague Bentley (born 14 January 1959) is a British businessman. He is the chief executive officer (CEO) of Mitie, and formerly the CEO of Cable & Wireless Communications. and the managing director of British Gas, the British retail arm of the energy company Centrica.

== Early life ==
Bentley was brought up in Bradford, and attended Woodhouse Grove School in Apperley Bridge. He holds a master's degree from Pembroke College, Oxford and an MBA from INSEAD. He is also a fellow of the Chartered Institute of Management Accountants.

== Career ==
Bentley joined BP's graduate recruitment scheme in 1982, training as a management accountant. He worked in China from 1983 to 1985, and then Egypt and the US, before returning to the UK as head of capital markets. He joined Grand Metropolitan in 1995, which became Diageo in 1997; from 1 July 1999 until 2000 he was finance director of UDV Guinness.

=== Centrica ===
Bentley was group finance director of Centrica from 2000 to February 2007. and was also managing director, Europe from July 2004 to September 2006.

On 19 September 2006 it was announced that Bentley would become the managing director of British Gas, part of the Centrica group, taking over from Mark Clare from March 2007. Bentley's stewardship was often controversial, as the company raised residential energy prices several times during his reign; protests at company premises were not unusual. Bentley frequently appeared in the media defending the company's decisions. The controversy was fuelled by the rise in profits during Bentley's stewardship – profits from the residential energy division of British Gas increased by 24% in one year alone. Bentley repeatedly claimed that price rises were beyond the company's control, and that they were not increased to raise profits. Bentley said that the reason for the price increase was that average domestic gas consumption had increased by 12 per cent compared to the warmer previous year. Throughout his time at the company Bentley's salary (£681,000 in 2013) was the subject of frequent criticism.

As managing director for seven-years, Bentley did have commercial success at Centrica, increasing turnover by nearly £4 billion. He was credited with improving the company’s customer services and rolling out new technologies such as smart meters.

On 27 February 2013, Centrica announced that Bentley would step down from his role at British Gas, from the Centrica board on 30 June 2013, and leave the company's employment on 31 December 2013. Bentley was replaced by the managing director of Direct Energy (also part of the Centrica group) Chris Weston.

=== Cable and Wireless ===
On 17 October 2013 it was announced that Bentley would succeed Tony Rice as CEO of Cable & Wireless Communications from 1 January 2014, coinciding with the relocation of the company headquarters from London to Miami, Florida. On 6 January 2014, C&WC announced that Bentley had purchased 4.3 million shares in the company, at a value of around 3 times his basic salary of £800,000. He demitted office after the acquisition of CWC by Liberty Global on 16 May 2016.

=== Mitie ===
In October 2016, it was announced that he would succeed Ruby McGregor-Smith as CEO of Mitie, which he duly did on 13 December 2016. Under Bentley’s leadership, Mitie has become the biggest FM operator in the UK, partly because of their acquisition of Interserve in late 2020. Since the start of the COVID pandemic, Bentley has overseen Mitie’s work delivering a wide range of services, including running Covid-19 testing sites, cleaning offices and major transport services, and providing security for new quarantine hotels. He has also attempted to use the pandemic to redefine the traditional image of cleaning by introducing UVC robots and units.

In 2025, Bentley received a total remuneration package of £6.5 million, including £4 million worth of incentive shares.

In June 2026, Bentley announced he will step down from his role at Mitie in March 2027.

=== Non-executive directorships ===
Between 2002 and 2010 he was a non-executive director and chair of the audit committee of Kingfisher plc. On 1 October 2012 Bentley was apportioned non-executive director of global engineering group IMI, and also joined the audit committee and nominations committee.

== Personal life ==
Bentley is married and has two children.
