= Comfort Systems USA =

American HVAC company

Comfort Systems USA, Inc.
- Type: Public
- Traded as: NYSE: FIX; S&P 500 component
- Industry: HVAC
- Founded: 1997; 29 years ago
- Headquarters: Houston, Texas, U.S.
- Key people: Franklin Myers (Chairman), Brian E. Lane (President & CEO), William George, III, (CFO)
- Revenue: ▲US$9.10 billion (2025)
- Net income: ▲US$1.02 billion (2025)
- Number of employees: 18,300 (2024)
- Website: comfortsystemsusa.com

Comfort Systems USA, Inc. is an American company that provides mechanical and electrical contracting services, primarily HVAC, plumbing, piping and controls, off-site construction, monitoring and fire protection, and installation and servicing of electrical systems.

The company is registered in Delaware and headquartered in Houston, Texas. It has 47 operating units with 178 locations in 136 cities in the United States. It is ranked 520th on the Fortune 500. In 2024, the company was ranked 6th by Engineering News-Record on its list of the top 600 specialty contractors.

In 2024, 56.7% of revenue was from installation services in newly constructed facilities and 43.3% was from renovation, expansion, maintenance, repair and replacement services in existing buildings.

== History ==
In June 1997, 12 companies were merged into the newly-formed Comfort Systems USA, which then became a public company via an initial public offering.

In February 2002, after a decline in business after the September 11 attacks and facing $205 million in debt due the following year, the company sold 19 subsidiaries to Emcor for $164 million in cash and the assumption of $22 million of debt.

=== Acquisitions ===
#	Year	Company	Description of Assets	Ref(s).
1	February 1998	Portfolio of 16 businesses	Price was $125 million in cash	
2	November 1998	Shambaugh & Son	Price was $50 million in cash, $30 million in notes and $30 million in common stock; division was sold to Emcor in 2002	
3	September 2000	Wichita Air Conditioning		
4	July 2010	ColonialWebb Contractors		
5	April 2017	BCH Mechanical	$100 million in revenues	
6	February 2020	Starr Electric	Offices in North Carolina and South Carolina	
7	February 2024	J & S Mechanical Contractor	Specializes in data center HVAC systems and hospital medical gas systems	
