= Emcor =

American construction company

EMCOR Group, Inc.
- Type: Public
- Traded as: NYSE: EME; S&P 500 component
- Industry: Engineering, Construction, and Property management
- Founded: December 1994; 31 years ago
- Headquarters: Norwalk, Connecticut, U.S.
- Key people: Anthony J. Guzzi (CEO)
- Revenue: ▲US$17.0 billion (2025)
- Net income: ▲US$1.27 billion (2025)
- Number of employees: 40,400 (2024)
- Website: emcorgroup.com

EMCOR Group, Inc., is an engineering, construction, and property management company headquartered in Norwalk, Connecticut.

Major clients, mostly of an industrial and/or commercial nature, include data centers, oil refineries; semiconductor, biotech, life sciences, government, and pharmaceutical facilities.

It has over 100 operating subsidiaries and approximately 180 locations. The company is ranked 300th on the Fortune 500. In 2025, the company was ranked 2nd by Engineering News-Record on its list of the largest 600 specialty contractors by revenue.

== Operations ==
The company's electrical and mechanical construction services division, representing 67% of revenues in 2024, provides construction and operation services for infrastructure such as power stations, including those that provide sustainable energy such as photovoltaic systems; food processing; road lighting and traffic control systems, and other heavy construction projects. Large projects in this division relate to data centers, data and fiber projects, and cabling, as well as semiconductor, biotech, life sciences, and pharmaceutical facilities.

The company's building services division, which represented 24% of revenues in 2024, maintains mechanical systems such as HVAC, plumbing, fire safety, automation, energy, and air quality. Notable government agencies that the company provides services for through its EMCOR Government Services subsidiary include the executive branch the National Archives and Records Administration, the Federal Deposit Insurance Corporation, National Aeronautics and Space Administration (NASA -- through the NASA Jet Propulsion Laboratory), as well as the departments of Transportation, Education, Health and Human Services, Energy, Defense, and Homeland Security; the legislative branch agency known as the Government Accountability Office (GAO); and the John Joseph Moakley United States Courthouse for the judicial branch .

The company's industrial services segment, which represented 9% of revenues in 2024, handles maintenance of oil refineries and other petrochemical processing plants and is also involved in projects using sustainable energy and carbon capture and storage.

== History ==
In 1994, Jamaica Water Properties filed for bankruptcy after making acquisitions unrelated to its core business and incurring significant debt. Frank MacInnis became CEO of the company, sold many of the businesses and renamed the remaining company as Emcor. The company also added facilities management services to provide a steady revenue stream. As of 2001, since the restructuring was completed in December 1994, the company had realized 27 consecutive quarters of year-over-year revenue growth. McInnis retired as CEO in January 2011 and as chairman in 2015. In December 2025, the company sold its operations in the United Kingdom to OCS Group for £190 million.

=== Acquisitions ===
| # | Year | Company | Price | Description of Assets | Ref(s). |
|---|---|---|---|---|---|
| 1 | February 2002 | 19 companies from Comfort Systems USA | $186 million | | |
| 2 | February 2003 | Consolidated Engineering Services | $178 million | Parent of Cincinnati-based Viox Services | |
| 3 | December 2005 | Fluidics | | Mechanical services company based in Philadelphia, Pennsylvania | |
| 4 | January 2006 | Comunale | | Fire protection and mechanical services company headquartered in Akron, Ohio | |
| 5 | August 2007 | Ohmstede | $455 million | Heat exchanger services provider | |
| 6 | February 2010 | Scalise Industries | | Engineering, facilities maintenance, and service company headquartered in Lawrence, Pennsylvania | |
| 7 | February 2011 | Bahnson Holdings | | Mechanical construction services company headquartered in Winston-Salem, North Carolina | |
| 8 | January 2012 | Southern Industrial Constructors | | Industrial services contractor | |
| 9 | July 2013 | RepconStrickland | $455 million | U.S. industrial and refinery service provider | |
| 10 | April 2016 | Ardent Services and Rabalais Constructors | $205 million | U.S. industrial and refinery electrical and instrumentation service provider | |
| 11 | April 2016 | Newcomb and Company | | HVAC commercial and industrial mechanical contractor | |
| 12 | March 2017 | CCI Mechanical | | Mechanical service and design-build contractor for the commercial, industrial, and data center markets headquartered in Salt Lake City | |
| 13 | August 2021 | Quebe Holdings | | Electrical services company | |
| 14 | February 2025 | Miller Electric | $865 million | Electrical contractor operating in the Southeastern U.S. | |
