= Mitie =

British strategic outsourcing and energy services company

Mitie Group PLC
- Type: Public
- Traded as: LSE: MTO; FTSE 250 component
- Industry: Facilities Management
- Founded: 1987
- Headquarters: London, United Kingdom
- Key people: Derek Mapp, Chairman; Phil Bentley, CEO
- Revenue: ▲£5,618.6 million (2026)
- Operating income: ▲£264.1 million (2026)
- Net income: ▼£90.3 million (2026)
- Number of employees: 84,000 (June 2026)
- Website: www.mitie.com/

Mitie Group PLC (pronounced "mighty") is a British strategic outsourcing and energy services company. It provides infrastructure consultancy, facilities management, property management, energy and healthcare services. It has a head office at The Shard in London, more than 200 smaller offices throughout the United Kingdom and Ireland and, as of June 2026, employs 84,000 people. It is listed on the London Stock Exchange and is a constituent of the FTSE 250 Index.

== History ==
=== Foundation and early activities ===
Mitie was founded by David Telling as MESL in 1987. One year later, the company was listed on the London Stock Exchange for the first time. It merged with Highgate & Job in 1989, after which it was renamed the Mitie Group.

Throughout the 2000s, the company pursued a strategy of growth through the acquisitions of various other businesses. In March 2006, it acquired Initial Security, a leading security business. During 2007, Mitie acquired Robert Prettie & Co. Ltd in exchange for £32.7m and incorporated the specialist plumbing, heating and mechanical services business into their Property Services division. In 2008, Mitie continued its strategy through the acquisition of Catering Partnership and DW Tilley; the latter purchase allowed Mitie to expand its roofing services nationwide. During 2009, Mitie completed the acquisition of Dalkia Facilities Management in exchange for £130m, which bolstered its Technical Facilities Management capability; it also expanded into social housing through the purchase of Environmental Property Services (EPS) for £38.5m. During 2010, Mitie acquired the integrated facilities management business of Dalkia in Ireland.

=== 2010s ===
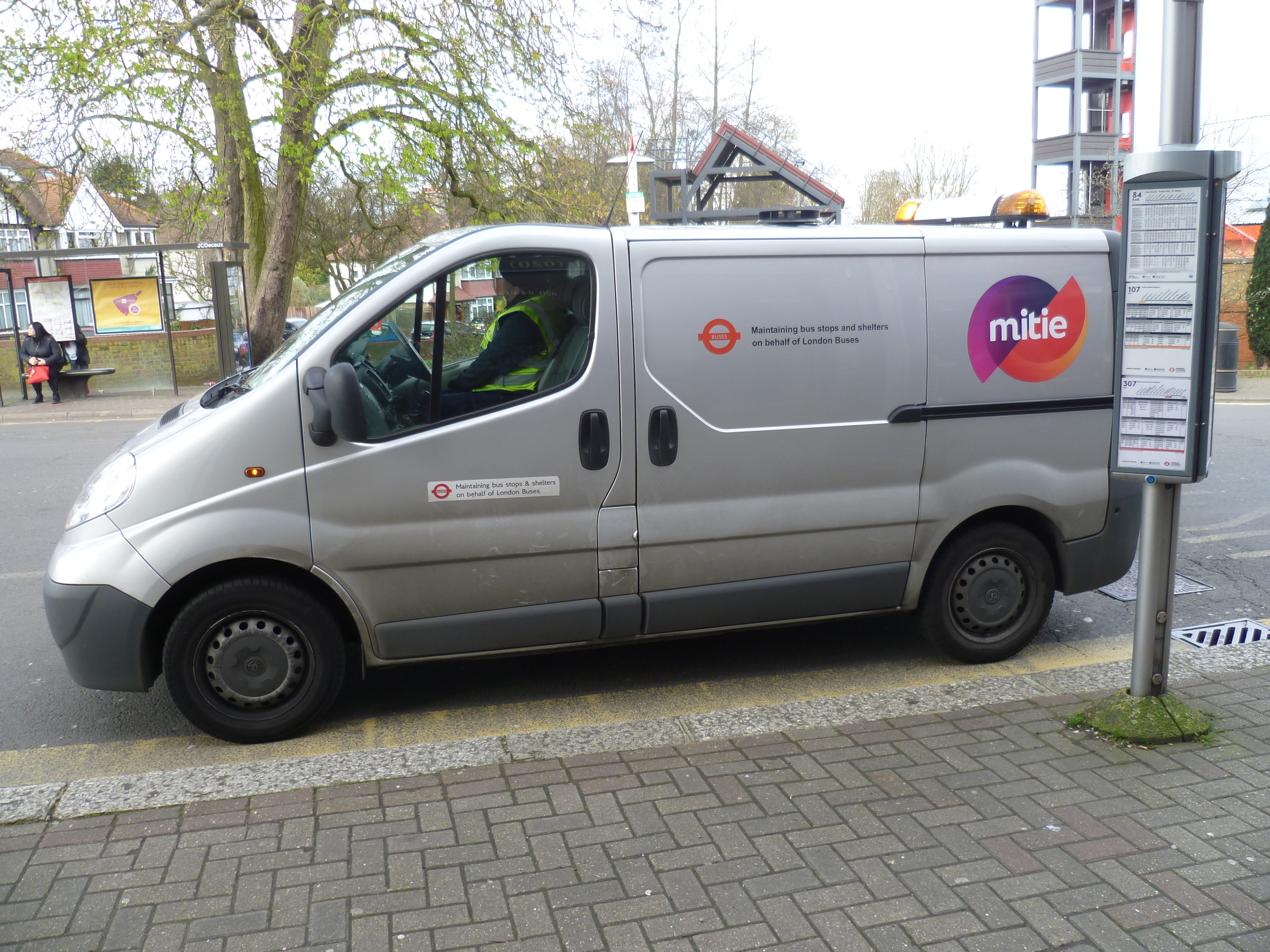
Mitie bus stop maintenance van in London

Mitie made its first acquisition in the health and social care sector in October 2012, when it spent £111 million on the homecare firm Enara. In April 2013, Mitie's chief executive, Ruby McGregor-Smith, was made non-executive director to the board of the Department for Culture, Media and Sport. During February 2014, Mitie introduced its new visual identity.

Between 2013 and 2015, cleaning staff employed by Mitie at various high-profile locations, including the Royal Opera House, the Houses of Parliament, the law firm Clifford Chance, First Great Western train services, and various NHS hospitals, held demonstrations against low pay.

In February 2014, Mitie announced an eight-year contract with the Home Office, making it the largest provider of immigration removal centres in the United Kingdom. Almost two years later, Mitie came under fire for its management of the immigration centres after the prison inspectorate stated that the facilities were "dirty", "rundown" and "insanitary". Mitie has continued to be involved in the sector.

The firm secured a cleaning contract with Royal Cornwall Hospitals NHS Trust during June 2014 valued at £90m over seven years. Sick pay cost £1.2m in its first eight months, compared with £280,000 for the NHS in the previous financial year; UNISON blamed the rise on staff stress, which it claimed had been caused by mistakes on pay. Such difficulties were not typical to Mitie's other NHS cleaning contracts, although there has been some criticism over their higher cost than other providers.

In November 2014, Mitie acknowledged that its homecare business was less profitable than had been anticipated and that it was struggling to recruit and retain sufficient numbers of care workers. During July 2015, East Sussex County Council reportedly ended a £2 million contract with Mitie to provide home care over allegedly poor standards of care provided.

During 2016, shares in Mitie fell to a four-year low after the company warned that an expected boom in outsourced services was not happening. Throughout both 2015 and 2016, it was reported that Mitie was one of the most shorted stocks in the FTSE 250. McGregor-Smith announced in November 2016 that the company was withdrawing from the healthcare business (providing home care for the elderly) in response to spending cuts and rising employment costs that had made the sector unviable.

In November 2017, the Financial Reporting Council (FRC) announced an investigation into the financial statements for the year ended 31 March 2016. This led to the disclosure in the Annual Report for 2017 that there had been errors in the impairment testing of healthcare goodwill and that, if certain judgements had instead been treated as errors, the amount of the prior year adjustment disclosed in the 2016 results would have increased by £44.0 million. This disclosure had addressed the FRC's concerns.

During December 2017, following a string of three profit warnings in the space of four months, McGregor-Smith stepped down from her role with the outsourcing group; she was replaced by former managing director of British Gas and current Chief Executive Phil Bentley.

=== 2020s ===
In June 2020, Mitie announced it was to buy Interserve's facilities management business in a cash and shares deal worth £271m, later revised downwards to £190m. The deal, following its ratification by Mitie's shareholders, was completed on 1 December 2020. The Interserve acquisition increased the company's exposure to public sector work from one-third to half of its overall business activities.

During the COVID-19 pandemic, Mitie added a wide range of services, including running Covid testing sites, cleaning offices and major transport services, and providing security for new quarantine hotels. The firm continued to work with Government departments such as the National Health Service, Department for Work and Pensions, the Ministry of Defence, and education providers. During 2021, the firm was publicly criticised over the management of several locations, including a Covid-19 testing site it ran under contract in Inverness and facilities at Russells Hall Hospital in Dudley, after several workers contracted the virus. In 2024, Mitie also resisted paying a COVID-related bonus to its private nursing staff that public NHS employees were given, although it relented in the face of industrial action.

In July 2023, Mitie was awarded a four-year £280 million contract with the national railway infrastructure owner Network Rail; the arrangement brought together four prior contracts and involved the delivery of a fully integrated facilities management service for the entire Network Rail estate, spanning 800 sites across the UK, including train stations, offices, rail operating centres, and other locations. That same year, it acquired four separate security-related businesses, Biservicus Group, GBE Converge Group, R H Irving and Linx International Group.

In February 2025, Mitie partnered with Elements Green, a solar and energy developer, to design their Staythorpe battery energy storage systems (BESS). The signed deal was for £71.5m.

The company announced the proposed acquisition of a fire safety services business, Marlowe, in June 2025. This was completed on the 4 August 2025.

In May 2026, the company was granted a Royal Warrant from King Charles III after providing cleaning services to Buckingham Palace and Windsor Castle.

In June 2026, Mitie announced Phil Bentley will step down as the company's CEO in March 2027.

In July 2026, Mitie was the subject of a £3.1bn cash takeover by facilities management firm OCS Group. The deal, if concluded in early 2027 (subject to shareholder and national security approvals and Competition and Markets Authority clearance), would create one of the UK's biggest outsourced services groups with combined annual revenues of around £8.5bn and a global workforce of 219,000 people.

== Operations ==
Mitie stands for Management Incentive Through Investment Equity. The management of the business typically invested part of the capital alongside Mitie, and if targets were met, they were able to sell their shares to Mitie after a fixed period for a sum based on the profits achieved (an earn out). Payment was made in a mixture of cash and Mitie shares. The managers usually remained with Mitie after the earnout.

Mitie operations are organised around 5 core segments: Engineering Maintenance, Security, Hygiene, Projects, and Fire & Security / Water & Environmental Services.

== Services ==
=== Integrated Facilities Management ===
Mitie's integrated facilities management (IFM) combines cleaning, security, engineering maintenance and energy services under one contract. In 2024, the company secured a seven-year, £297 million IFM contract with the Department for Transport, covering over 800 UK sites.

=== Engineering Maintenance ===
Mitie provides mechanical and electrical maintenance for a building's assets. In 2021, Mitie was awarded a seven-year Ministry of Defence maintenance contract worth up to £646 million covering sites in Scotland and Northern Ireland.

=== Security ===
This division provides human guarding and monitoring of a facility. Mitie operates security services for the Department for Work and Pensions in the UK, reported as the largest security workforce within the UK government estate.

=== Hygiene ===
This division provides cleaning and washroom services to corporate, transport, and healthcare customers. Mitie has held the cleaning contract for Heathrow Airport since 2018, expanding to cover all terminals in 2022.

=== Projects ===
This division carries out capital works such as mechanical and electrical installation and decarbonisation infrastructure construction. Through subsidiary G2 Energy, Mitie is the design and build contractor on the Staythorpe battery energy storage system in Nottinghamshire, described by press as one of the largest battery storage projects in Europe.

=== Fire Safety and Environmental Compliance ===
This division, providing fire safety systems and environmental compliance was expanded in 2025 through Mitie's acquisition of Marlowe.

=== Landscapes ===
Mitie Landscapes provides grounds maintenance, horticultural and winter gritting services to commercial, healthcare and infrastructure clients across the UK. In 2016 the division won a BALI National Landscape Award for its grounds maintenance work at Vodafone's Newbury headquarters.

=== Workplace ===
Mitie's Workplace division delivers front-of-house, concierge and workplace experience services, often integrated with technology such as its Connected Workspace platform. In 2021, Mitie was awarded a £62 million facilities management contract with Phoenix Group that included Connected Workspace services.

=== Decarbonisation ===
Mitie's decarbonisation, or Plan Zero service provides energy audits alongside renewable installations through a funded retrofit model to reduce carbon emissions. In 2021, Mitie partnered with Sustainable Development Capital LLP to provide third-party financing for clients' decarbonisation projects.

== Controversy ==
In February 2022, The Sunday Mirror revealed a Mitie WhatsApp group relating to immigration management paid by the Home Office that exchanged racist and offensive messages amongst colleagues since March 2020.
