= Office for Tackling Injustices =

Proposed UK government body

The Office for Tackling Injustices (OfTI) is a proposed UK government body announced on 12 July 2019. It was said by Prime Minister Theresa May that it would work independently to encourage future governments to focus on addressing inequalities in society. The body would collect evidence on disparities in areas including socio-economic background, ethnicity, gender, disability and sexual orientation. Its role would be limited to collecting and publishing data, and it would not make any policy recommendations, leading it to criticism for duplicating data-gathering functions already performed by bodies such as the Office for National Statistics. The Guardian described the OfTI as a way for May to secure a legacy before a new leader was elected by the Conservative Party membership.

In March 2020, The Observer reported that the organisation had not convened or submitted a budget since its inception, with one unidentified participant stating "(it) doesn't exist – it is never going to exist. It has been thrown into the long grass... People involved in it have never even been told what the plan was. They have heard nothing."
